= List of Olivia Rodrigo live performances =

Olivia Rodrigo live performances
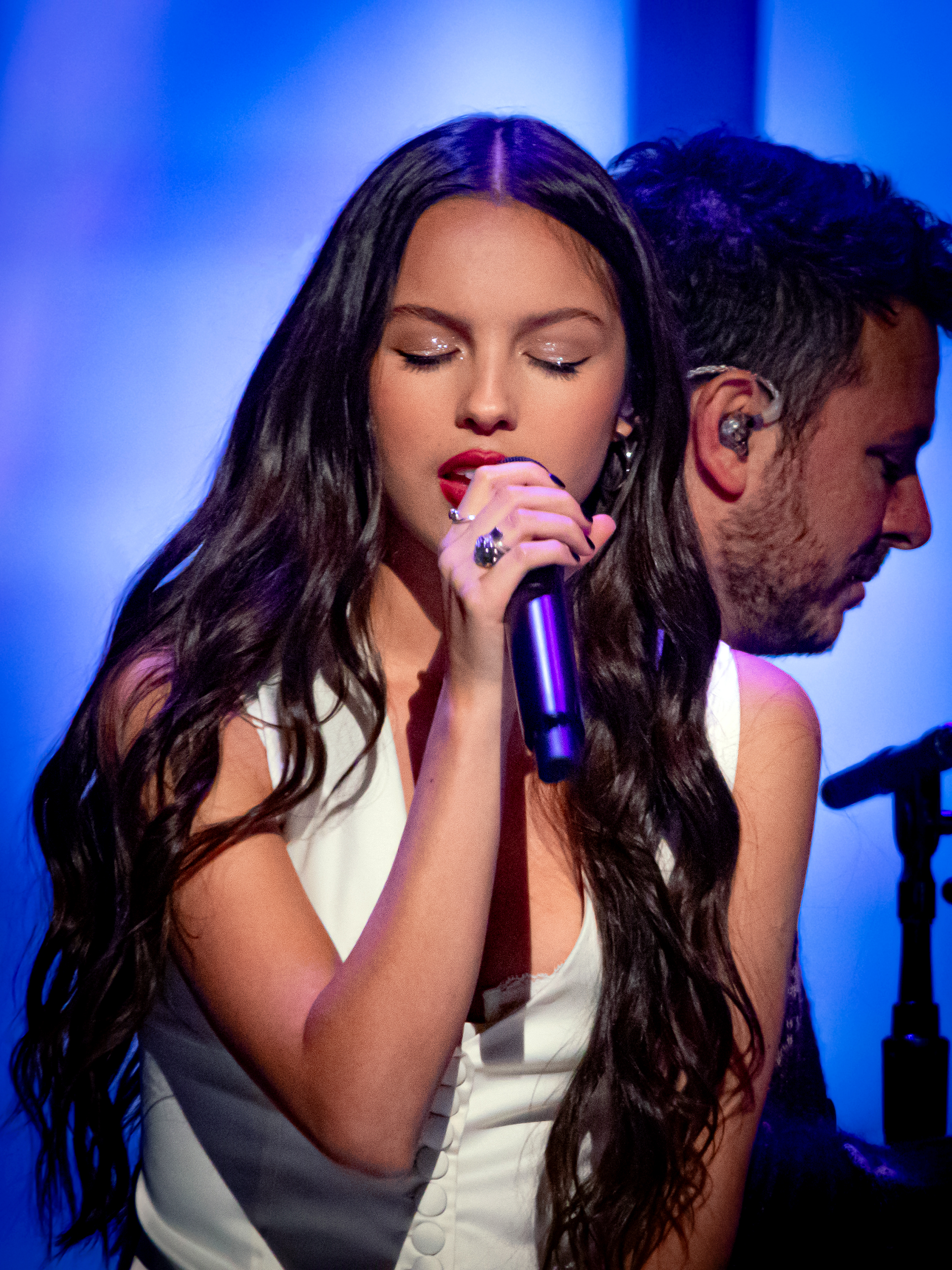
- Rodrigo performing at the Ace Hotel in 2023
- Concert tours: 3
- Music festivals: 25
- Broadcast appearances: 23
- Award shows: 11

The American singer-songwriter Olivia Rodrigo has headlined three concert tours supporting her studio albums. In 2022, she embarked on her first concert tour, the Sour Tour, in support of her debut studio album, Sour (2021).

A month after the release of her follow-up album, Guts (2023), Rodrigo hosted the stand-alone concert An Evening With Olivia Rodrigo, before embarking on her first world arena tour, the Guts World Tour, in February 2024, touring Asia and Oceania for the first time. The Guts tour grossed over $209 million, becoming the highest-grossing tour by an artist born in the 21st century. During the tour she performed a sold-out show at the Philippine Arena, the world's largest indoor arena. The tour was filmed at various stops and the resulting Guts: World Tour movie was released by Netflix in October 2024. To promote Sour and Guts, Rodrigo has also appeared on various television broadcasts, performing both her own songs and covers of other artists' songs. Appearances include Saturday Night Live, Tiny Desk Concerts, and Good Morning America, alongside promotions on various syndications in Japan.

Aside from her concert tours, Rodrigo has performed at music festivals in the United States and Europe, including appearances at the IHeartRadio Music Festival and Glastonbury Festival. In 2024, she performed at Coachella as a surprise guest during No Doubt's set. In 2026, she launched the Daisy Chain Fields music festival, a charity festival dedicated to organizations that support women and girls. The line-up is all female and includes Rodrigo. Rodrigo has performed at award shows where she and her work received nominations, including the 2021 Brit Awards and MTV Video Music Awards and the 64th and 66th Annual Grammy Awards ceremonies.

== Concert tours ==
Title	Dates	Associated album	Continent(s)	Shows
Sour Tour	April 5, 2022 – July 7, 2022	Sour	Europe; North America	49
Guts World Tour	February 23, 2024 – July 1, 2025	Guts	Asia; Europe; North America; Oceania; South America	102
The Unraveled Tour	September 25, 2026 – May 10, 2027	You Seem Pretty Sad for a Girl So in Love	Europe; North America	86

== Promotional concerts ==
Date	Title	Venue	City	Country	Performed song(s)	Ref.
June 29, 2021	Sour Prom	Unknown	Los Angeles	United States	"Happier / Deja Vu"; "Traitor"; "Jealousy, Jealousy"; "Good 4 U"; "Driver's License"; "Brutal"; "Enough for You"	
October 9, 2023	An Evening with Olivia Rodrigo	Theatre at Ace Hotel Los Angeles	Los Angeles	United States	"Vampire" (acoustic); "Lacy" (acoustic); "Ballad of a Homeschooled Girl" (acoustic); "The Grudge"; "Teenage Dream"; "Get Him Back!"; "All-American Bitch; "Traitor"	
October 23, 2025	An Evening with Olivia Rodrigo	Park Avenue Armory	New York City	United States	"Bad Idea Right?"; "Ballad of a Homeschooled Girl"; "Vampire"; "Lacy"; "Pretty Isn't Pretty"; "Drivers License"; "Traitor"; "So American"; "All-American Bitch"; "Favorite Crime"; "Deja Vu"; "Good 4 U" (acoustic); "Get Him Back!" (acoustic)	
April 24, 2026	One Night Only	The Echo	Los Angeles	United States	"Drop Dead" (Note: Performed twice); "Begged" (with Weyes Blood); "Lacy"; "Drivers License"; "Deja Vu"; "Good 4 U"; "All-American Bitch"; "Ballad of a Homeschooled Girl"; "Vampire"; "Bad Idea Right?"; "Jealousy, Jealousy"; "So American"	
May 8, 2026	Spotify Billions Club Live	Teatre Grec	Barcelona	Spain	"Bad Idea Right?"; "Ballad of a Homeschooled Girl"; "Vampire"; "Drop Dead"; "Drivers License"; "Traitor"; "Jealousy, Jealousy"; "Happier"; "Lacy"; "Favorite Crime"; "Deja Vu"; "Brutal"; "Good 4 U"; "Get Him Back!"	
August 6, 2026	One Night Only	Warsaw	New York City	United States	"Drop Dead"; "U + Me = <3"; "Stupid Song"; "My Way"; "Bad Idea Right?"; "Honeybee"; "Drivers License"; "Making the Bed"; "Maggots for Brains"; "All-American Bitch"; "The Cure"; "Less"; "Expectations"; "Good 4 U"; "Deja Vu"	
September 1, 2026	An Evening with Olivia Rodrigo +	Los Angeles	Grammy Museum	United States	"Drop Dead"; "Stupid Song"; "Maggots for Brains"; "Less"; "The Cure"	

== Music festivals ==
Date	Festival	City	Country	Performed song(s)	Ref.
September 18, 2021	iHeartRadio Music Festival	Las Vegas	United States	"Brutal"; "Jealousy, Jealousy"; "Drivers License"; "Traitor"; "Good 4 U"	
June 25, 2022	Glastonbury Festival	Pilton	England	Brutal; "Jealousy, Jealousy" (rock version); "Drivers License"; "Complicated" (Avril Lavigne cover); "Hope ur ok"; "Enough For You" / "1 Step Forward, 3 Steps Back" (mashup); "Happier"; "All I Want"; "Favorite Crime"; "Traitor"; "Fuck You" (alongside Lily Allen); "Deja Vu"; "Good 4 U"	
June 29, 2022	Live at the Marquee	Cork	Ireland	Brutal; "Jealousy, Jealousy" (rock version); "Drivers License"; "Complicated" (Avril Lavigne cover); "Hope ur ok"; "Enough For You" / "1 Step Forward, 3 Steps Back" (mashup); "Happier"; "All I Want"; "Ready to Go (Republica cover); "Favorite Crime"; "Traitor"; "Deja Vu"; "Good 4 U"	
December 1, 2023	Jingle Ball Tour 2023	Los Angeles	United States	"All-American Bitch"; "Get Him Back!"; "Deja Vu"; "Vampire"; "Drivers License"; "Can't Catch Me Now"; "Brutal"; "Good 4 U"	
December 8, 2023	Jingle Ball Tour 2023	New York City	United States	"All-American Bitch"; "Get Him Back!"; "Deja Vu"; "Vampire"; "Drivers License"; "Can't Catch Me Now"; "Brutal"; "Good 4 U"	
January 30, 2025	FireAid	Inglewood	United States	"Drivers License"; "Deja Vu"	
March 21, 2025	Lollapalooza Chile	Santiago	Chile	"Obsessed"; "Ballad of a Homeschooled Girl"; "Vampire"; "Drivers License"; "Traitor"; "Bad Idea Right?"; "Love Is Embarrassing"; "Pretty Isn't Pretty"; "Happier"; "Lacy"; "Enough for You"; "Don't Speak" (No Doubt cover); "So American"; "Jealousy, Jealousy"; "Favorite Crime"; "Teenage Dream"; "Deja Vu"; "Brutal"; "All-American Bitch"; "Good 4 U"; "Get Him Back!"	
March 23, 2025	Lollapalooza Argentina	Buenos Aires	Argentina	"Obsessed"; "Ballad of a Homeschooled Girl"; "Vampire"; "Drivers License"; "Traitor"; "Bad Idea Right?"; "Love Is Embarrassing"; "Pretty Isn't Pretty"; "Happier"; "Lacy"; "Enough for You"; "Don't Speak" (No Doubt cover); "So American"; "Jealousy, Jealousy"; "Favorite Crime"; "Teenage Dream"; "Deja Vu"; "Brutal"; "All-American Bitch"; "Good 4 U"; "Get Him Back!"	
March 28, 2025	Lollapalooza Brasil	São Paulo	Brazil	"Obsessed"; "Ballad of a Homeschooled Girl"; "Vampire"; "Drivers License"; "Traitor"; "Bad Idea Right?"; "Love Is Embarrassing"; "Pretty Isn't Pretty"; "Happier"; "Lacy"; "Enough for You"; "So American"; "Jealousy, Jealousy"; "Favorite Crime"; "Teenage Dream"; "Deja Vu"; "Brutal"; "All-American Bitch"; "Good 4 U"; "Get Him Back!"	
March 30, 2025	Festival Estéreo Picnic	Bogotá	Colombia	"Obsessed"; "Ballad of a Homeschooled Girl"; "Vampire"; "Drivers License"; "Traitor"; "Bad Idea Right?"; "Love Is Embarrassing"; "Pretty Isn't Pretty"; "Happier"; "Lacy"; "Enough for You"; "So American"; "Jealousy, Jealousy"; "Favorite Crime"; "Teenage Dream"; "Deja Vu"; "Brutal"; "All-American Bitch"; "Good 4 U"; "Get Him Back!"	
April 6, 2025	Pal Norte	Monterrey	Mexico	"Obsessed"; "Ballad of a Homeschooled Girl"; "Vampire"; "Drivers License"; "Traitor"; "Bad Idea Right?"; "Love Is Embarrassing"; "Pretty Isn't Pretty"; "Happier"; "Lacy"; "Enough for You"; "So American"; "Jealousy, Jealousy"; "Favorite Crime"; "Teenage Dream"; "Deja Vu"; "Brutal"; "All-American Bitch"; "Good 4 U"; "Get Him Back!"	
June 7, 2025	Governors Ball Music Festival	New York City	United States	"Obsessed"; "Ballad of a Homeschooled Girl"; "Vampire"; "Drivers License"; "Traitor"; "Bad Idea Right?"; "Love Is Embarrassing"; "Pretty Isn't Pretty"; "Happier"; "Enough for You"; "So American"; "Jealousy, Jealousy"; "Favorite Crime"; "Burning Down the House" (alongside David Byrne); "Deja Vu"; "Brutal"; "All-American Bitch"; "Good 4 U"; "Get Him Back!"	
June 21, 2025	Pinkpop Festival	Landgraaf	Netherlands	"Obsessed"; "Ballad of a Homeschooled Girl"; "Vampire"; "Drivers License"; "Traitor"; "Bad Idea Right?"; "Love Is Embarrassing"; "Pretty Isn't Pretty"; "Happier"; "Enough for You"; "So American"; "Jealousy, Jealousy"; "Favorite Crime"; "Deja Vu"; "Brutal"; "All-American Bitch"; "Good 4 U"; "Get Him Back!"	
June 27, 2025	British Summer Time Hyde Park	London	England	"Bad Idea Right?"; "Ballad of a Homeschooled Girl"; "Vampire"; "Drivers License"; "Traitor"; "Obsessed"; "Love Is Embarrassing"; "Pretty Isn't Pretty"; "Happier"; "Enough for You"; "So American"; "Jealousy, Jealousy"; "Favorite Crime"; "The A Team" (alongside Ed Sheeran); "Deja Vu"; "Brutal"; "All-American Bitch"; "Good 4 U"; "Get Him Back!"	
June 29, 2025	Glastonbury Festival	Pilton	England	"Obsessed"; "Ballad of a Homeschooled Girl"; "Vampire"; "Drivers License"; "Traitor"; "Bad Idea Right?"; "Love Is Embarrassing"; "Pretty Isn't Pretty"; "Happier"; "Enough for You"; "Friday I'm in Love" (alongside Robert Smith); "Just like Heaven" (alongside Smith); "So American"; "Jealousy, Jealousy"; "Favorite Crime"; "Deja Vu"; "Brutal"; "All-American Bitch"; "Good 4 U"; "Get Him Back!"	
July 4, 2025	Roskilde Festival	Roskilde	Denmark	"Obsessed"; "Ballad of a Homeschooled Girl"; "Vampire"; "Drivers License"; "Traitor"; "Bad Idea Right?"; "Love Is Embarrassing"; "Pretty Isn't Pretty"; "Happier"; "Enough for You"; "So American"; "Jealousy, Jealousy"; "Favorite Crime"; "Deja Vu"; "Brutal"; "All-American Bitch"; "Good 4 U"; "Get Him Back!"	
July 6, 2025	Rock Werchter	Werchter	Belgium	"Obsessed"; "Ballad of a Homeschooled Girl"; "Vampire"; "Drivers License"; "Traitor"; "Bad Idea Right?"; "Love Is Embarrassing"; "Pretty Isn't Pretty"; "Happier"; "Enough for You"; "So American"; "Jealousy, Jealousy"; "Favorite Crime"; "Deja Vu"; "Brutal"; "All-American Bitch"; "Good 4 U"; "Get Him Back!"	
July 10, 2025	NOS Alive	Oeiras	Portugal	"Obsessed"; "Ballad of a Homeschooled Girl"; "Vampire"; "Drivers License"; "Traitor"; "Bad Idea Right?"; "Love Is Embarrassing"; "Pretty Isn't Pretty"; "Happier"; "Enough for You"; "So American"; "Jealousy, Jealousy"; "Favorite Crime"; "Deja Vu"; "Brutal"; "All-American Bitch"; "Good 4 U"; "Get Him Back!"	
July 12, 2025	Mad Cool	Madrid	Spain	"Obsessed"; "Ballad of a Homeschooled Girl"; "Vampire"; "Drivers License"; "Traitor"; "Bad Idea Right?"; "Love Is Embarrassing"; "Pretty Isn't Pretty"; "Happier"; "All I Want"; "Enough for You"; "So American"; "Jealousy, Jealousy"; "Favorite Crime"; "Deja Vu"; "Brutal"; "All-American Bitch"; "Good 4 U"; "Get Him Back!"	
July 15, 2025	I-Days	Milan	Italy	"Obsessed"; "Ballad of a Homeschooled Girl"; "Vampire"; "Drivers License"; "Traitor"; "Bad Idea Right?"; "Love Is Embarrassing"; "Pretty Isn't Pretty"; "Happier"; "All I Want"; "Enough for You"; "So American"; "Jealousy, Jealousy"; "Favorite Crime"; "Deja Vu"; "Brutal"; "All-American Bitch"; "Good 4 U"; "Get Him Back!"; "Lacy"	
July 18, 2025	Lollapalooza Paris	Paris	France	"Obsessed"; "Ballad of a Homeschooled Girl"; "Vampire"; "Drivers License"; "Traitor"; "Bad Idea Right?"; "Love Is Embarrassing"; "Pretty Isn't Pretty"; "Happier"; "Lacy"; "Enough for You"; "So American"; "Jealousy, Jealousy"; "Favorite Crime"; "Deja Vu"; "Brutal"; "All-American Bitch"; "Good 4 U"; "Get Him Back!"	
August 1, 2025	Lollapalooza	Chicago	United States	"Obsessed"; "Ballad of a Homeschooled Girl"; "Vampire"; "Drivers License"; "Traitor"; "Bad Idea Right?"; "Love Is Embarrassing"; "Pretty Isn't Pretty"; "Happier"; "Enough for You"; "Buddy Holly" (alongside Weezer); "Say It Ain't So" (alongside Weezer); "So American"; "Jealousy, Jealousy"; "Lacy"; "Deja Vu"; "Brutal"; "All-American Bitch"; "Good 4 U"; "Get Him Back!"; "teenage dream"	
August 3, 2025	Osheaga Festival	Montreal	Canada	"Obsessed"; "Ballad of a Homeschooled Girl"; "Vampire"; "Drivers License"; "Traitor"; "Bad Idea Right?"; "Love Is Embarrassing"; "Pretty Isn't Pretty"; "Happier"; "All I Want"; "Enough for You"; "So American"; "Jealousy, Jealousy"; "Lacy"; "Deja Vu"; "Brutal"; "All-American Bitch"; "Good 4 U"; "Get Him Back!"	
June 6, 2026	Primavera Sound (Note: Surpise performance)	Barcelona	Spain	"Bad Idea Right?"; "Ballad of a Homeschooled Girl"; "Vampire"; "Drop Dead"; "Drivers License"; "Traitor"; "The Cure"; "Deja Vu"; "What's Wrong with Me" (with Robert Smith); "Good 4 U"	
August 29, 2026	Daisy Chain Fields (Note: Performer and founder/organizer)	Irvine	United States	"Drop Dead"; "Bad Idea Right?"; "Good 4 U"; "My Way"; "Serena Joy"; "Maggots For Brains"; "Stupid Song"; "Building A Mystery" (alongside Sarah McLachlan); "Angel" (alongside Sarah McLachlan); "Honeybee"; "Drivers License"; "The Cure"; "Ironic" (alongside Alanis Morissette); "Expectations"; "All-American Bitch"; "Deja Vu"; "Landslide" (alongside Stevie Nicks)	
December 4, 2026	Jingle Ball Tour 2026	Inglewood	United States	TBA	

== Broadcast performances ==
Date	Program	City	Country	Performed song(s)	Ref.
February 6, 2020	Live with Kelly and Ryan	New York City	United States	"All I Want"	
March 10, 2020	Dunkin' Latte Lounge	New York City	United States	"All I Want"; "The Edge of Glory" (Lady Gaga cover)	
December 10, 2020	Good Morning America	New York City	United States	"River" (Joni Mitchell cover)	
February 5, 2021	The Tonight Show Starring Jimmy Fallon	Los Angeles	United States	"Drivers License"	
May 15, 2021	Saturday Night Live	New York City	United States	"Drivers License"; "Good 4 U"	
June 8, 2021	Sôkai jôhô variety Sukkiri!!	Tokyo	Japan	"Drivers License"	
June 12, 2021	Shibuya Note	Tokyo	Japan	"Drivers License"	
October 26, 2021	Jimmy Kimmel Live!	Los Angeles	United States	"Traitor"	
December 4, 2021	Austin City Limits	Austin	United States	"Brutal"; "Happier"; "Jealousy, Jealousy"; "Drivers License"; "Traitor"; "Favorite Crime"; "Enough For You"; "Good 4 U"	
December 7, 2021	Tiny Desk (Home)	Glendale	United States	"Good 4 U"; "Traitor"; "Driver's License"; "Deja Vu"	
September 8, 2023	Today	New York City	United States	"Vampire"; Get Him Back!"; "Drivers License"; "Good 4 U"	
September 26, 2023	DayDay	Tokyo	Japan	"Vampire"	
October 2, 2023	Live Lounge	Los Angeles	United States	"Vampire"; "Deja Vu"; "Get Him Back!"; "Bad Idea Right?"; "Stick Season" (Noah Kahan cover); "Drivers License"	
October 24, 2023	Jimmy Kimmel Live!	Los Angeles	United States	"Ballad of a Homeschooled Girl"	
December 9, 2023	Saturday Night Live	New York City	United States	"Vampire" (piano; slowed); "All-American Bitch"	
December 10, 2023	Tiny Desk Concerts	Washington, D.C.	United States	"Love is Embarrassing"; "Vampire"; "Lacy"; "Making the Bed"	
December 11, 2023	The Late Show with Stephen Colbert	New York City	United States	"Can't Catch Me Now"	
December 18, 2023	The Late Show with Stephen Colbert	New York City	United States	"Vampire"	
May 2, 2026	Saturday Night Live	New York City	United States	"Drop Dead"; "Begged"	
June 2, 2026	BBC Radio 1 Live Lounge	London	England	"The Cure"; "When a Good Man Cries" (CMAT cover)	
June 10, 2026	Jimmy Kimmel Live!	Los Angeles	United States	"The Cure"	
June 11, 2026	Jimmy Kimmel Live!	Los Angeles	United States	"Stupid Song"	
October 9, 2026 (Note: Recorded on July 29, 2026)	Austin City Limits	Austin	United States	"My Way"; "Drop Dead" (Note: Excluded from broadcast); "U + Me = <3"; "Stupid Song"; "Bad Idea Right?"; "Maggots for Brains"; "Begged"; "Purple"; Vampire"; "Less"; "Honeybee"; "Drivers License"; "The Cure"; "Cigarette Smoke"; "Expectations"; "Deja Vu"	

== Award shows ==
Date	Program	City	Country	Performed song(s)	Ref.
May 11, 2021	Brit Awards	London	England	"Drivers License"	
September 12, 2021	MTV Video Music Awards	Brooklyn	United States	"Good 4 U"	
November 21, 2021	American Music Awards	Los Angeles	United States	"Traitor"	
March 2, 2022	Billboard Women in Music	Inglewood	United States	"Deja Vu"	
April 3, 2022	Grammy Awards	Paradise	United States	"Drivers License"	
November 5, 2022	Rock and Roll Hall of Fame Induction Ceremony	Los Angeles	United States	"You're So Vain" (Carly Simon tribute)	
September 12, 2023	MTV Video Music Awards	Newark	United States	"Vampire"; "Get Him Back!"	
November 3, 2023	Rock and Roll Hall of Fame Induction Ceremony	Brooklyn	United States	"If It Makes You Happy" (with Sheryl Crow)	
February 4, 2024	Grammy Awards	Los Angeles	United States	"Vampire"	
November 8, 2025	Rock and Roll Hall of Fame Induction Ceremony	Los Angeles	United States	"We're Going to Be Friends" (The White Stripes tribute with Feist)	
September 14, 2026	BMI Troubadour Award	Nashville	United States	"Strong Enough" (Sheryl Crow tribute)	

== Other performances ==
Date	Event	City	Country	Venue	Performed song(s)	Ref.
July 3, 2022	—N/a (Note: This was a surprise impromptu set between performances of local bands, the same day Rodrigo performed a headlining Sour Tour show in the same city.)	Manchester	England	Bunny Jacksons	"Torn" (Ednaswap song)	
August 24, 2022	Billy Joel in Concert (Note: Rodrigo appeared as a surprise guest performer on the corresponding show of Billy Joel's tour, Billy Joel in Concert.)	New York City	United States	Madison Square Garden	"Uptown Girl" (with Billy Joel); "Deja Vu"	
September 29, 2023	—N/a	Nashville	United States	The Bluebird Café	"Lacy"; "Vampire"; "Making the Bed"; "If It Makes You Happy" (with Sheryl Crow)	
April 13, 2024 (Note: Rodrigo appeared as a surprise guest performer on the first weekend of No Doubt's set at Coachella.)	Coachella	Indio	United States	Empire Polo Club	"Bathwater" (with No Doubt)	
April 18, 2026 (Note: Rodrigo appeared as a surprise guest performer on the second weekend of Addison Rae's set at Coachella.)	Coachella	Indio	United States	Empire Polo Club	"Headphones On" (with Addison Rae); "Drop Dead" (with Addison Rae)	
April 26, 2026	—N/a	Brooklyn	United States	Pete's Candy Store	"Drop Dead"	
May 12, 2026	Disney Upfront	New York City	United States	Jacob K. Javits Convention Center	"Drop Dead"; "Good 4 U"; "Get Him Back!"	
July 31, 2026	Lollapalooza (Note: Rodrigo appeared as a surprise guest performer during the Smashing Pumpkins' set at Lollapalooza.)	Chicago	United States	Grant Park	"Thirty-Three" (with the Smashing Pumpkins)	
