= Sour Tour =

2022 concert tour by Olivia Rodrigo

- Tour by Olivia Rodrigo
- Promotional poster for the tour
- Location: Europe; North America
- Associated album: Sour
- Start date: April 5, 2022
- End date: July 7, 2022
- Legs: 2
- No. of shows: 49
- Supporting acts: Gracie Abrams; Holly Humberstone; Chappell Roan; Baby Queen
- Box office: $3.1 million (11 shows)

Olivia Rodrigo concert chronology
- Sour Tour (2022); Guts World Tour (2024–2025)

The Sour Tour was the debut concert tour by American singer-songwriter Olivia Rodrigo in support of her debut studio album, Sour (2021). It began on April 5, 2022, in Portland, Oregon, with shows across North America and Europe. It concluded in London on July 7, comprising 49 shows. Gracie Abrams, Holly Humberstone, Chappell Roan, and Baby Queen served as opening acts.

== Background ==
In July 2021, Billboard reported that the singer would be unable to embark on a tour until the following year due to her television commitments and her contract with Disney. An official concert cycle was announced through social media on December 6, with tickets going on sale four days later.

Tickets for the tour went on sale December 10 for fans who were chosen for "Verified Fan" registration. Tickets sold out in minutes, although many attributed this to ticket scalpers, with some tickets being listed on secondhand sites for more than $9,000 within minutes of tickets going on sale. Many fans and media outlets criticized the choosing of smaller venues over arenas, citing it as the reason many fans were unable to secure tickets. Rodrigo defended her decision to perform at smaller venues, telling the Los Angeles Times "I don’t think I should skip any steps" and assuring fans "there will be more tours in the future."

== Set list ==
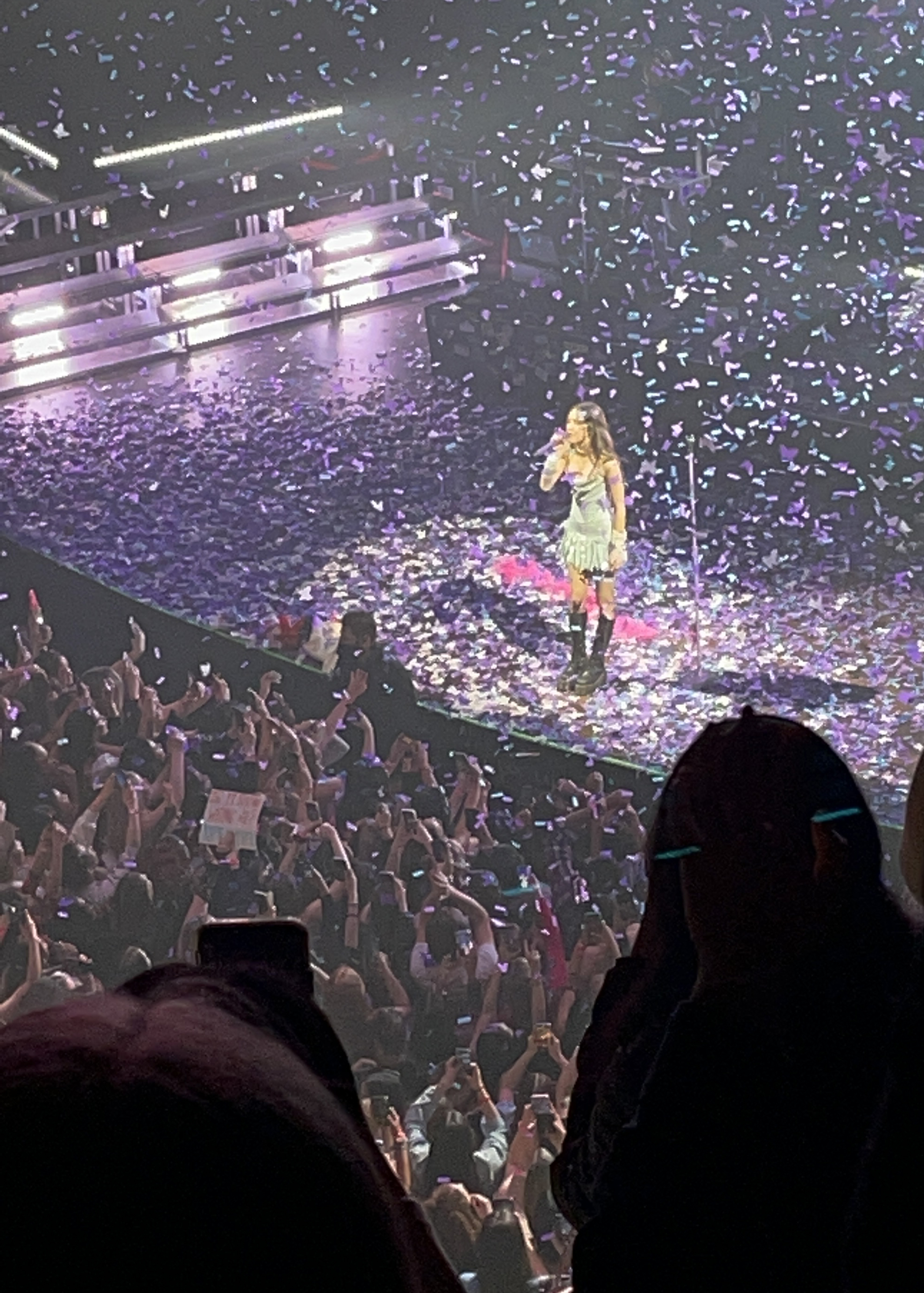
Olivia Rodrigo at Massey Hall, April 2022.

This set list was representative of the show on April 5, 2022, in Portland. It was not representative of all concerts for the duration of the tour.

1. "Brutal"
2. "Jealousy, Jealousy"
3. "Drivers License"
4. "Complicated" (Avril Lavigne cover)
5. "Hope Ur OK"
6. "Enough For You" / "1 Step Forward, 3 Steps Back"
7. "Happier"
8. "Seether" (Veruca Salt cover)
9. "Favorite Crime"
10. "Traitor"
11. "Deja Vu"
12. "Good 4 U"

=== Notes ===
- During the show in Vancouver, Conan Gray joined Rodrigo onstage to perform Katy Perry's "The One That Got Away".
- Starting with the show in Orem, "All I Want" was added to the set list. "Seether" was not performed.
- During the first show in Toronto, Avril Lavigne joined Rodrigo onstage to perform "Complicated".
- Starting with the first show in Philadelphia, "Seether" was removed from the set list and replaced with a cover of No Doubt's "Just a Girl".
- During the first show in Los Angeles, Alanis Morissette joined Rodrigo onstage to perform "You Oughta Know". "Just a Girl" was not performed.
- During the show in Berlin, Rodrigo performed a cover of t.A.T.u.'s "All the Things She Said" in place of "Just a Girl".
- Starting with the show in Brussels, a cover of Republica's "Ready to Go" was added to the set list in place of "All the Things She Said".
- During the show of the Glastonbury Festival in Pilton, Lily Allen joined Rodrigo on stage to perform "Fuck You". "Ready to Go" was not performed.
- During the show in Dublin, Rodrigo performed a cover of "Nothing Compares 2 U", as a tribute to Sinéad O'Connor, in place of "Ready to Go".
- During the first show in London, Natalie Imbruglia joined Rodrigo on stage to perform "Torn". "Ready to Go" was not performed.

== Tour dates ==
List of 2022 concerts, showing date, city, country, venue, opening acts, attendance and gross revenue
| Date (2022) | City | Country | Venue | Opening acts | Attendance | Revenue |
|---|---|---|---|---|---|---|
| April 5 | Portland | United States | Theater of the Clouds | Gracie Abrams | 6,472 / 6,472 | $318,976 |
| April 6 | Seattle | United States | WaMu Theater | Gracie Abrams | —N/a | —N/a |
| April 7 | Vancouver | Canada | Thunderbird Sports Centre | Gracie Abrams | —N/a | —N/a |
| April 9 | Orem | United States | UCCU Center | Gracie Abrams | —N/a | —N/a |
| April 11 | Denver | United States | Mission Ballroom | Gracie Abrams | —N/a | —N/a |
| April 12 | Denver | United States | Mission Ballroom | Gracie Abrams | —N/a | —N/a |
| April 14 | Minneapolis | United States | The Armory | Gracie Abrams | —N/a | —N/a |
| April 15 | Chicago | United States | Aragon Ballroom | Gracie Abrams | —N/a | —N/a |
| April 16 | Chicago | United States | Aragon Ballroom | Gracie Abrams | —N/a | —N/a |
| April 19 | Milwaukee | United States | Eagles Ballroom | Gracie Abrams | —N/a | —N/a |
| April 20 | Chesterfield | United States | The Factory | Gracie Abrams | —N/a | —N/a |
| April 22 | Cincinnati | United States | Andrew J. Brady Music Center | Gracie Abrams | —N/a | —N/a |
| April 23 | Detroit | United States | Masonic Temple Theatre | Gracie Abrams | —N/a | —N/a |
| April 26 | New York City | United States | Radio City Music Hall | Holly Humberstone | 11,885 / 11,885 | $704,544 |
| April 27 | New York City | United States | Radio City Music Hall | Holly Humberstone | 11,885 / 11,885 | $704,544 |
| April 29 | Toronto | Canada | Massey Hall | Holly Humberstone | —N/a | —N/a |
| April 30 | Toronto | Canada | Massey Hall | Holly Humberstone | —N/a | —N/a |
| May 3 | Boston | United States | Roadrunner | Holly Humberstone | —N/a | —N/a |
| May 4 | Washington, D.C. | United States | The Anthem | Holly Humberstone | 6,000 / 6,000 | $323,500 |
| May 6 | Philadelphia | United States | The Met Philadelphia | Holly Humberstone | —N/a | —N/a |
| May 7 | Philadelphia | United States | The Met Philadelphia | Holly Humberstone | —N/a | —N/a |
| May 9 | Atlanta | United States | Coca-Cola Roxy | Holly Humberstone | —N/a | —N/a |
| May 10 | Nashville | United States | Grand Ole Opry House | Holly Humberstone | 4,288 / 4,288 | $231,076 |
| May 12 | Houston | United States | 713 Music Hall | Holly Humberstone | —N/a | —N/a |
| May 13 | Austin | United States | Moody Amphitheater | Holly Humberstone | —N/a | —N/a |
| May 14 | Irving | United States | The Pavilion at Toyota Music Factory | Holly Humberstone | —N/a | —N/a |
| May 17 | Phoenix | United States | Arizona Financial Theatre | Holly Humberstone | —N/a | —N/a |
| May 18 | San Diego | United States | The Rady Shell at Jacobs Park | Holly Humberstone | —N/a | —N/a |
| May 20 | Paradise (Note: Promoted as Las Vegas) | United States | Chelsea Ballroom | Holly Humberstone | —N/a | —N/a |
| May 21 | Santa Barbara | United States | Santa Barbara Bowl | Holly Humberstone | —N/a | —N/a |
| May 24 | Los Angeles | United States | Greek Theatre | Holly Humberstone | —N/a | —N/a |
| May 25 | Los Angeles | United States | Greek Theatre | Holly Humberstone | —N/a | —N/a |
| May 27 (Note: The concert in San Francisco was previously scheduled for April 2, marking the beginning of the tour, but was postponed due to the rescheduling of the 64th Annual Grammy Awards to April 3 from its original January date.) | San Francisco | United States | Bill Graham Civic Auditorium | Chappell Roan | 8,775 / 8,775 | $575,472 |
| June 11 | Hamburg | Germany | Stadtpark Open Air | Baby Queen | —N/a | —N/a |
| June 13 | Berlin | Germany | Verti Music Hall | Baby Queen | —N/a | —N/a |
| June 15 | Zürich | Switzerland | Halle 622 | Baby Queen | —N/a | —N/a |
| June 16 | Milan | Italy | Fabrique | Baby Queen | —N/a | —N/a |
| June 18 | Cologne | Germany | Palladium | Baby Queen | —N/a | —N/a |
| June 19 | Brussels | Belgium | Forest National | Baby Queen | —N/a | —N/a |
| June 21 | Paris | France | Zénith | Baby Queen | —N/a | —N/a |
| June 22 | Amsterdam | Netherlands | AFAS Live | Baby Queen | —N/a | —N/a |
| June 25 (Note: The show on June 25, 2022 was part of the Glastonbury Festival.) | Pilton | England | Worthy Farm | —N/a | —N/a | —N/a |
| June 29 (Note: The show on June 29, 2022 was part of Live at the Marquee.) | Cork | Ireland | Docklands | Baby Queen | —N/a | —N/a |
| June 30 | Dublin | Ireland | Fairview Park | Baby Queen | 4,969 / 4,969 | $259,658 |
| July 2 | Glasgow | Scotland | O_{2} Academy Glasgow | Baby Queen | —N/a | —N/a |
| July 3 | Manchester | England | O_{2} Apollo Manchester | Baby Queen | 3,453 / 3,453 | $146,077 |
| July 4 | Birmingham | England | O_{2} Academy Birmingham | Baby Queen | 2,993 / 2,993 | $126,638 |
| July 6 | London | England | Eventim Apollo | Baby Queen | 10,327 / 10,327 | $474,353 |
| July 7 | London | England | Eventim Apollo | Baby Queen | 10,327 / 10,327 | $474,353 |
| Total | | | | | 59,162 / 59,162 (100%) | $3,160,294 |

== Personnel ==
- Olivia Rodrigo - lead vocals, piano and acoustic guitar
- Heather Baker - guitar, backing vocals, musical director
- Daisy Spencer - guitar
- Hayley Brownell - drums
- Arianna Powell - guitar, backing vocals
- Moa Munoz - bass guitar, backing vocals and keyboards
- Camila Mora - keyboards, backing vocals
- Matheus Bremer - acoustic guitar
- Alexis Lowes - Tour Manager

== See also ==
- Olivia Rodrigo discography
- List of awards and nominations received by Olivia Rodrigo
