= Kathleen (musician) =

American singer-songwriter

- Born: Kathleen Brady Ross; November 1, 1993 (age 32); Whidbey Island, Washington, US
- Occupation: Singer-songwriter
- Years active: 2012–present
- Website: Official website

Kathleen Brady Ross (born November 1, 1993), performing as Kathleen since 2020, is an American singer-songwriter. Originally performing under the name Kate Brady, her viral song "Sailing Ships" led to her signing with music publishing and licensing company Lyric House.

== Career ==
Kathleen Brady Ross was born on November 1, 1993, in Whidbey Island, Washington, and grew up in Colorado. She attended Steamboat Springs High School, where she performed in choirs, acted in school plays, and taught herself guitar and piano. In her senior year of high school, a classmate asked her to write a song for graduation. The resulting song, "Sailing Ships", went viral, getting features on the front page of Reddit and in the Huffington Post and racking up 110,000 views within four days. In July 2013, she signed with music publishing and licensing company Lyric House.

As a senior at the University of Colorado Boulder, Ross entered the fifth Guitar Center Singer-Songwriter artist discovery program with her original song "August" and was selected as a top-five finalist from a pool of 14,000 contestants. For the finals, she performed "August" and "Sailing Ships" and won, earning her a four-song EP, studio time with Grammy Award-winning producer Ariel Rechtshaid, and a performance on Jimmy Kimmel Live!. After graduating college with a degree in English and creative writing, she moved to Los Angeles to pursue her music career.

In 2018, Ross was selected by Japanese composer Hydelic to write and sing on the tracks "Connected (Yours Forever)" and "Always Been But Never Dreamed" for Tetris Effect. In 2019, she recorded and released a cover of "Both Sides, Now" as part of the "Turn Her Up" project by Pixie Lott & independent record label frtyfve for International Women's Day. That same year, she was signed by Warner Records under the name Kathleen and recorded a number of singles and two EPs, Kathleen I & II, released in 2020.

Ross's cover version of "Pure Imagination", released in 2020, was used in a national ad campaign for Marriott Hotels & Resorts. On Olivia Rodrigo's debut album Sour, Ross was credited as a background vocalist and performed some vocal arrangements for the tracks "Favorite Crime" & "Happier". Ross also has background vocals credits on Chappell Roan's "Pink Pony Club".

In 2024, OneBeat announced Ross as a fellow for their residency and performance program.

Following the release of Live From Highland Park, Kathleen left Warner Records and became an independent artist, releasing songs under her own label, Chewing Sounds.

== Personal life ==
Ross currently lives in Paris, France.

== Discography ==
- "Pure Imagination" (2019)
- Kathleen I (2020)
- Kathleen II (2020)
- Fever Dream/How Long Will This Last (2022)
- "Phantom Love" (2022)
- Live From Highland Park (2023)
- "Suzanne" (2023)
- "Magnolia Tree" (2023)
- "Loved to Death" (2025)
- "Back Down to Earth" (2025)

Other appearances

- Always Afternoon – MEDASIN (2019)
- Tetris Effect (Original Soundtrack) (2020)
- "Favorite Crime" and "Happier" – Olivia Rodrigo (2021)
- "Good Enough" – Maisie Peters (2022)
- "Pink Pony Club" – Chappell Roan (2023)
