= Traitor (song) =

2021 single by Olivia Rodrigo

Single by Olivia Rodrigo

from the album Sour
- Released: August 10, 2021
- Recorded: 2020
- Studio: Amusement (Los Angeles)
- Genre: Folk; indie pop; rock
- Length: 3:49
- Label: Geffen; Interscope
- Songwriters: Olivia Rodrigo; Dan Nigro
- Producer: Dan Nigro

Olivia Rodrigo singles chronology
"Good 4 U" (2021)	"Traitor" (2021)	"Brutal" (2021)

Music video
- "Traitor" on YouTube

"Traitor" (stylized in all lowercase) is a song by American singer-songwriter Olivia Rodrigo. It was released to US radio on August 10, 2021, through Geffen and Interscope Records, as the fourth single from Rodrigo's debut album, Sour (2021). A ballad combining folk, indie pop, and rock styles, the song was written by Rodrigo and Dan Nigro and produced by the latter.

Before it was promoted as a single, upon Sour's release, "Traitor" became a fan-favorite and achieved commercial success. Music critics praised the song for its vocals and lyrics and picked it as an album highlight. "Traitor" arrived at number nine in the United States, number five in the United Kingdom, and peaked within the top 10 in Australia, Canada, Ireland, New Zealand, Portugal, and on the Billboard Global 200. The song was also certified diamond in Mexico and multi-platinum in Australia, Canada, New Zealand, the United Kingdom and the United States. The song received its debut performance in Rodrigo's YouTube concert film Sour Prom (2021) That was featured in her official channel.

== Background and release ==
Following the minor success of "All I Want" (2019), American singer-songwriter Olivia Rodrigo signed with Geffen Records, a subsidiary of Interscope Records, intending to release her debut extended play in 2021. After the widespread success of Rodrigo's debut single "Drivers License", released on January 8, 2021, she decided she wanted to make a full-length studio album instead.

Alongside the release of her second single "Deja Vu" on April 1, 2021, Rodrigo announced that her debut studio album, under the placeholder title *O*R, would be released on May 21. On April 13, Rodrigo announced the cover art and announced the title of her debut studio album Sour. Together with the announcement, the track listing was announced, and "Traitor" was revealed to appear as track two on Sour. The song was released with a lyric video alongside the album on May 21, 2021. "Traitor" was sent to radio in the US on August 10, 2021, as the fourth single from Sour.

== Composition ==
"Traitor"
A 21-second sample of the second chorus of "Traitor". Rodrigo sings over a slow guitar-lead backing track while expressing her frustrations of being betrayed.

"Traitor" is a rock, indie pop, and folk ballad. The song has been rumored to be about American actor and singer Joshua Bassett, who co-starred with Rodrigo in High School Musical: The Musical: The Series. Lyrically, the song is about "feeling betrayed when you see your ex stepping into a new relationship while you're still reeling from your separation", as she whispers the lyrics "Guess you didn't cheat but you're still a traitor".

"Traitor" features a cinematic rise and fall of acoustics and a layering of harmonies. Musically, the song is set in the key of E♭ major, and has a moderately slow tempo of 50 beats per minute. The song is set in 6/8 time, and Rodrigo's vocals in the song span from B♭_{3} to A♭_{5}.

== Critical reception ==
Claire Dodson, writing for Teen Vogue, called "Traitor" "flawless", and remarked that the song had a "Kacey Musgraves-esque light-folk backdrop". Tatiana Tenreyro of The A.V. Club called the song "[Rodrigo's] most vulnerable song yet". NME's Rhian Daly described the song as "gorgeous". Larisha Paul from Billboard praised the song, deeming it to feature Rodrigo's "best vocal performance" throughout Sour. As the song is sandwiched between two emotionally heavy tracks with heavy production, Larisha Paul of Billboard called the song a "chilling contrast" that features Rodrigo's best vocal performance on the album. Rolling Stone's Angie Martoccio also called the song as the "long-lost cousin" of Taylor Swift's 2020 song, "My Tears Ricochet".

== Commercial performance ==
Before it was promoted as a single, "Traitor" debuted on several record charts on the week of the release of Sour, where other deep cuts also premiered. On the Billboard Global 200 and charts for English-speaking territories, such as the UK Singles Charts, these debuts were in the top-ten. These included the Canadian and US Billboard Hot 100, where they shared the top-ten with "Good 4 U" and "Deja Vu".

In the US, Billboard underscored how "Traitor" accumulated impressive sales and streaming units for an album track. "Traitor" also reached number 3 on Billboard Streaming Songs chart, distinguishing Rodrigo as the first artist in history to claim all of the top three on the chart for consecutive weeks. The song began in the top-five in Ireland and New Zealand, while in the UK and Australia, it peaked at number five in its second week. The song remained in the top-ten in these four territories for more than a month. The song quickly received various gold and platinum certifications within months, with gold certifications from Music Canada and New Zealand on June 6 and July 8, 2021, respectively. The song has been certified multiple-times platinum in several countries since, with a 4× Platinum certification in New Zealand as late as August 6, 2026.

Commenting on the song's critical and commercial success, Rodrigo said "I wrote it on my bed while I was crying. I never really thought that it was going to be a song that resonated with so many people. I thought that it was a very specific situation that I was going through, and it's so funny that that's the non-single song that's the most successful. So many people have been like, 'How did you know? This is exactly what happened to me!'".

== Live performances ==
"Traitor" received its debut performance on June 26, 2021, as part of the release of Rodrigo's concert film Sour Prom. Later, she performed the song at the iHeartRadio Music Festival on September 17–18, 2021, in Las Vegas, Austin City Limits on October 2, 2021, as well as on Jimmy Kimmel Live and at the 2021 American Music Awards. An acoustic performance was featured on Rodrigo's documentary film Driving Home 2 U: A Sour Film, released on March 25, 2022, on Disney+. Olivia also performed "traitor" which was featured in her Tiny Desk Performance on the NPR Music YouTube channel on December 7, 2021. "Traitor" and was also featured for Dolby Atmos where she "experienced" the song in Dolby Audio. She performed this song on her SOUR Tour, where it was usually sandwiched between “Favorite Crime” and “Deja Vu”.

== Music video ==
A music video for "Traitor", directed by Olivia Bee, was released on October 21, 2021. She promoted the video on Instagram with the caption "surprise! traitor mv out now!"

The music video received a nomination for Best Pop Video at the 2022 MTV Video Music Awards.

== Credits and personnel ==
Credits adapted from the liner notes of Sour.

Recording

- Recorded at Amusement Studios (Los Angeles)
- Mixed at SOTA Studios (Los Angeles)
- Mastered at Sterling Sound (New York City)

Personnel

- Olivia Rodrigo – vocals, backing vocals, songwriting, piano (or acoustic guitar) on live performances
- Dan Nigro – songwriting, production, acoustic guitars, electric guitars, piano, drum programming, Juno 60, B3 organ, backing vocals
- Ryan Linvill – bass guitar, drum programming, synthesizer
- Randy Merrill – mastering
- Mitch McCarthy – mixing

== Charts ==
=== Weekly charts ===
Chart performance
Chart (2021–2022)	Peak position
Australia (ARIA)	5
Belgium (Ultratop 50 Flanders)	44
Canada Hot 100 (Billboard)	9
Canada CHR/Top 40 (Billboard)	21
Canada Hot AC (Billboard)	38
Czech Republic Singles Digital (ČNS IFPI)	51
Denmark (Tracklisten)	38
Global 200 (Billboard)	7
Greece (IFPI)	27
Iceland (Tónlistinn)	27
Indonesia (Billboard)	24
Ireland (IRMA)	3
Lithuania (AGATA)	68
Malaysia (RIM)	13
Netherlands (Global Top 40)	9
Netherlands (Single Top 100)	53
New Zealand (Recorded Music NZ)	5
Norway (VG-lista)	16
Portugal (AFP)	8
Singapore (RIAS)	11
Slovakia Singles Digital (ČNS IFPI)	52
South Africa (RISA)	24
Spain (Promusicae)	71
Sweden (Sverigetopplistan)	56
Switzerland (Schweizer Hitparade)	95
UK Singles (Official Charts)	5
US Billboard Hot 100	9
US Adult Contemporary (Billboard)	23
US Adult Pop Airplay (Billboard)	15
US Dance Airplay (Billboard)	30
US Pop Airplay (Billboard)	7

Chart (2024)	Peak position
Philippines (Philippines Hot 100)	58

=== Year-end charts ===
2021 year-end chart performance
Chart (2021)	Position
Australia (ARIA)	42
Canada (Canadian Hot 100)	40
Global 200 (Billboard)	59
Iceland (Tónlistinn)	65
Ireland (IRMA)	30
New Zealand (Recorded Music NZ)	49
Portugal (AFP)	57
UK Singles (OCC)	42
US Billboard Hot 100	38
US Mainstream Top 40 (Billboard)	42

2022 year-end chart performance
Chart (2022)	Position
Global 200 (Billboard)	58

== Certifications ==
Certifications
Region	Certification	Certified units/sales
Australia (ARIA)	5× Platinum	350,000^{‡}
Austria (IFPI Austria)	Platinum	30,000^{‡}
Belgium (BRMA)	Gold	20,000^{‡}
Brazil (Pro-Música Brasil)	3× Diamond	480,000^{‡}
Canada (Music Canada)	8× Platinum	640,000^{‡}
Denmark (IFPI Danmark)	Platinum	90,000^{‡}
France (SNEP)	Platinum	200,000^{‡}
Germany (BVMI)	Gold	300,000^{‡}
Italy (FIMI)	Gold	50,000^{‡}
Mexico (AMPROFON)	Diamond+2× Platinum	980,000^{‡}
New Zealand (RMNZ)	4× Platinum	120,000^{‡}
Norway (IFPI Norway)	Platinum	60,000^{‡}
Poland (ZPAV)	Platinum	50,000^{‡}
Portugal (AFP)	2× Platinum	20,000^{‡}
Spain (Promusicae)	Platinum	60,000^{‡}
United Kingdom (BPI)	3× Platinum	1,800,000^{‡}
United States (RIAA)	4× Platinum	4,000,000^{‡}
Streaming
Greece (IFPI Greece)	Gold	1,000,000^{†}
Sweden (GLF)	Gold	4,000,000^{†}
^{‡} Sales+streaming figures based on certification alone.^{†} Streaming-only figures based on certification alone.

== Release history ==
Release dates and formats
Region	Date	Format(s)	Label(s)	Ref.
United States	August 10, 2021	Contemporary hit radio	Geffen; Interscope	
United States	November 10, 2021	Hot AC radio	Geffen; Interscope	
Italy	December 17, 2021	Radio airplay	Universal	
