= Brutal (song) =

2021 single by Olivia Rodrigo

Single by Olivia Rodrigo

from the album Sour
- Released: September 3, 2021
- Recorded: 2020
- Studio: Amusement (Los Angeles)
- Genre: Pop; alternative rock; emo-punk; grunge; pop-punk; pop rock
- Length: 2:24
- Label: Geffen
- Songwriters: Olivia Rodrigo; Dan Nigro
- Producer: Dan Nigro

Olivia Rodrigo singles chronology
"Traitor" (2021)	"Brutal" (2021)	"Vampire" (2023)

Music video
- "Brutal" on YouTube

"Brutal" (stylized in all lowercase) is a song by American singer-songwriter Olivia Rodrigo. It was released through Geffen Records as part of Rodrigo's debut album, Sour (2021), before releasing to Italian radio on September 3, 2021 as the fifth and final single. "Brutal" was written by Rodrigo and Dan Nigro, and produced by the latter.

A pop, alternative rock, emo-punk, grunge, pop-punk, and pop rock tune, "Brutal" is driven by rock instrumentation consisting of brash electric guitars and drums. Its lyrics express Rodrigo's fear, worries and frustrations as a teenager entering adulthood. An accompanying music video to the song was released on August 23, 2021. It incorporates heavy visual elements from the 1990s–2000s, especially the era's video games, while illustrating teenage angst. Commercially, the song reached the top 20 in various countries. In the United States, it landed at number 12 on the Billboard Hot 100, and topped the Hot Rock & Alternative Songs chart.

== Background and release ==
Following the minor success of "All I Want" (2019), American singer-songwriter Olivia Rodrigo signed with Geffen Records, a subsidiary of Interscope Records, intending to release her debut extended play in 2021. After the widespread success of Rodrigo's debut single "Drivers License", released on January 8, 2021, she decided she wanted to make a full-length studio album instead.

Alongside the release of her second single "Deja Vu" on April 1, 2021, Rodrigo announced that her debut studio album, under the placeholder title *O*R, would be released on May 21. On April 13, Rodrigo announced the cover art and announced the title of her debut studio album Sour. Together with the announcement, the track listing was announced, and "Brutal" was revealed to appear as track one on Sour. The song was released with a lyric video alongside the album on May 21, 2021. It was also released to Italian contemporary hit radio formats through Universal Music Italy on September 3, 2021, as the fifth single from the album.

== Composition ==
"Brutal"
A sample of the chorus in "Brutal", depicting dynamic drums and heavy guitars.

"Brutal" is one of eleven songs from Olivia Rodrigo's debut album Sour. The song presents the idea that one's teenage years are the best years and shares a sentiment of teenage frustration. It was written on a whim by Rodrigo and the song's producer Dan Nigro. It has been described as a pop and rock song in the styles of alternative rock, emo-punk, grunge, pop-punk, and pop rock, with elements of indie rock, punk, and riot grrrl.

"Brutal" features a guitar riff similar in cadence and identical in key to that of Elvis Costello's 1978 song "Pump It Up", which led to accusations of plagiarism. Costello — who cited Bob Dylan's "Subterranean Homesick Blues" and Chuck Berry's "Too Much Monkey Business" as inspiration for "Pump It Up" — replied to a tweet about the topic to defend Rodrigo, stating: "This is fine by me ... It's how rock and roll works. You take the broken pieces of another thrill and make a brand-new toy. That's what I did." In 2026, Costello doubled down on his defense of Rodrigo, describing the plagiarism accusations as "too silly to talk about" and noting he had since met Rodrigo, describing her as "lovely".

== Reception ==
"Brutal" received positive reviews from critics. Billboard's Larisha Paul described "Brutal"'s opening as "shimmering" and "brilliant", and the rest of the song as "grungy rock". Jules Lefevre, writing for Junkee, described the song as "infinitely enjoyable", and described Rodrigo's vocals as "kiss-off". Rolling Stone's Angie Martoccio likened Rodrigo in the song to "an excited teenager relaying gossip on a rotary phone". Olivia Horn of Pitchfork speculated on whether "Brutal" is "[b]ucking expectations about the kind of sounds [Rodrigo] might gravitate toward" and describes that as just "part of the fun". AllMusic reviewer Heather Phares called "Brutal" "a surprisingly punky blast of angst", likening the guitars to "the musical equivalent of an eyeroll."

Entertainment Weekly called "Brutal" the best song of 2021, describing it as "like stepping through a Lollapalooza looking glass, the alt-nation swagger and blown-out guitar fuzz of the Breeders and Elastica reborn in one dimpled Gen-Z teen." Following the release of Sour, "Brutal" debuted at number 12 on the US Billboard Hot 100, and atop the Billboard Hot Rock & Alternative Songs chart.

== Music video ==
A music video for "Brutal" was released on August 23, 2021, directed by Canadian director Petra Collins. The video features cameo appearances from actors Lukas Gage and Nico Hiraga, as well as model Salem Mitchell. Rodrigo's hairstyles in the video were styled by Clayton Hawkins. The video depicts Rodrigo's "teenage angst", using various visual elements of 1990s-2000s pop culture. As of October 2023, the music video has amassed more than 52 million views on YouTube. Vogue described the video as a "visual treat" and a compendium of "Y2K beauty", incorporating various looks that marked the 1990s-2000s era, alongside "playfully brash rebellion". Vulture and Insider noted similarities to Rina Sawayama's music video for "XS" (2020).

A still from the "Brutal" music video, showing a video game interface consisting of various avatars of Rodrigo.

It opens in a "glitchy, throwback dimension", where an array of Rodrigo avatars appear, each adorning a stylized wig and exaggerated personality; an 8-bit version of "Brutal" plays in the background. One of the costumes is a reference to Leeloo from the 1997 movie and 1998 video game The Fifth Element. It is a "choose-your-player" selection, channeling Adobe Flash web games of the early 2000s. The various attires Rodrigo adopts in the video include a slicked ballet bun, plaited pigtails with a newsboy cap, low-slung space twists reminiscent of Mandy Moore's "Candy" music video, and two partial pigtails with wavy brunette and burgundy hair. A cursor clicks on Rodrigo dressed in a pastel blue ballet outfit and a matching wig, before changing to a scene where she squirms on a ballet studio floor after breaking her ankle while trying to perform en pointe. It is followed by scenes such as anchoring an oddly vivacious morning news program with gossip (whose logo is the same as the 1990s logo for UK news program News at Ten), a dull high school classroom, crying on an Instagram Livestream, a stressed-out pop star shooting a commercial, and being physically dragged through an abandoned Westfield Santa Anita by "two real friends", among others. Right after the line "I can't even parallel park", the music stops briefly and Rodrigo is stuck in the crowded mall parking lot with cars beeping and she mouths the words "What the fuck". Near the end of the video, Rodrigo climbs to the top of a Cadillac while the lyric "and God, I don't even know where to start" plays. The video concludes with her standing in the car, with a set of ballet dancers performing en pointe, while surrounded by other cars loudly beeping.

The music video received two nominations at the 2022 MTV Video Music Awards for "Video of the Year" and "Best Editing".

== Usage in media ==
"Brutal" appeared in the opening montage of Hockey Night in Canada's coverage of Game 2 of the 2021 Stanley Cup Finals between the Montreal Canadiens and the Tampa Bay Lightning. The song also served as the soundtrack for the first trailer of Amazon Prime Video's I Know What You Did Last Summer and in the opening scene of the season one finale of HBO Max's Gossip Girl. "Brutal" was also heavily featured during episode 4 of HBO's Hard Knocks season which chronicled the training camp for the 2021 Dallas Cowboys season. The song also appeared in Netflix's Do Revenge, The Imperfects and The School for Good and Evil. The song also appeared in PAW Patrol: The Mighty Movie.

== Credits and personnel ==
Credits adapted from the liner notes of Sour.

Recording

- Recorded at Amusement Studios (Los Angeles)
- Mixed at SOTA Studios (Los Angeles)
- Mastered at Sterling Sound (New York City)

Personnel

- Olivia Rodrigo – vocals, backing vocals, songwriting
- Dan Nigro – backing vocals, songwriting, production, recording, acoustic guitar, drum programming, electric guitar, synthesizer
- Erick Serna – bass, electric guitar
- Ryan Linvill – additional drum programming, Wurlitzer
- Paul Cartwright – viola, violin
- Randy Merrill – mastering
- Mitch McCarthy – mixing

== Charts ==
=== Weekly charts ===
Weekly chart performance
Chart (2021–2022)	Peak position
Australia (ARIA)	12
Canada Hot 100 (Billboard)	13
Czech Republic Singles Digital (ČNS IFPI)	48
Global 200 (Billboard)	11
Greece (IFPI)	38
Ireland (IRMA)	81
Lithuania (AGATA)	93
New Zealand (Recorded Music NZ)	8
Portugal (AFP)	14
Singapore (RIAS)	22
Slovakia Singles Digital (ČNS IFPI)	53
Spain (Promusicae)	78
Sweden Heatseeker (Sverigetopplistan)	7
UK Audio Streaming (Official Charts)	10
US Billboard Hot 100	12
US Hot Rock & Alternative Songs (Billboard)	1

=== Year-end charts ===
Year-end chart performance
Chart (2021)	Position
Global 200 (Billboard)	155
US Hot Rock & Alternative Songs (Billboard)	12

== Certifications ==
Certifications
Region	Certification	Certified units/sales
Australia (ARIA)	2× Platinum	140,000^{‡}
Austria (IFPI Austria)	Gold	15,000^{‡}
Brazil (Pro-Música Brasil)	3× Platinum	120,000^{‡}
Canada (Music Canada)	4× Platinum	320,000^{‡}
Mexico (AMPROFON)	Platinum+Gold	210,000^{‡}
New Zealand (RMNZ)	Platinum	30,000^{‡}
Poland (ZPAV)	Gold	25,000^{‡}
Portugal (AFP)	Gold	5,000^{‡}
Spain (Promusicae)	Gold	30,000^{‡}
United Kingdom (BPI)	Platinum	600,000^{‡}
United States (RIAA)	2× Platinum	2,000,000^{‡}
^{‡} Sales+streaming figures based on certification alone.

== Release history ==
Release dates and formats
Region	Date	Format	Label(s)	Ref.
Italy	September 3, 2021	Radio airplay	Universal	
