= 1 Step Forward, 3 Steps Back =

2021 song by Olivia Rodrigo

Song by Olivia Rodrigo

from the album Sour
- Released: May 21, 2021
- Studio: Amusement (Los Angeles)
- Length: 2:43
- Label: Geffen
- Songwriters: Olivia Rodrigo; Taylor Swift; Jack Antonoff
- Producer: Dan Nigro

Lyric video
- "1 Step Forward, 3 Steps Back" on YouTube

"1 Step Forward, 3 Steps Back" (stylized in all lowercase) is a song written and recorded by American singer-songwriter Olivia Rodrigo. It is the 4th track on her debut studio album, Sour, which was released on May 21, 2021, via Geffen Records. Dan Nigro produced the song. Taylor Swift and Jack Antonoff also received songwriting credits for its interpolation of Swift's 2017 song "New Year's Day".

The song's lyrics describe the harmful effects of inconsistent communication on a romantic relationship. Musically, "1 Step Forward, 3 Steps Back" is a tender downtempo ballad driven by a damp piano and subtle bass. Upon Sour's release, "1 Step Forward, 3 Steps Back" received positive comments from music critics, who complimented its simplistic instrumentation and vulnerable lyrics. Commercially, the song reached the top 20 in Australia, Canada, Singapore, and the United States, and the top 30 in New Zealand and Portugal.

== Background and release ==
We interpolated "New Year's Day," which is Taylor's song from Reputation. I came up with the "1 step forward" concept and I sort of wrote a verse and a chorus, and when I got home — I was in the car on a road trip, and when I got home, I decided to sing it over the chords of "New Year's Day." I think they're really beautiful chords. I was lucky enough to get that approved, and it's on the record now.

— Rodrigo on interpolating "New Year's Day" in "1 Step Forward, 3 Steps Back", Billboard

Following the viral success of her debut single "Drivers License", on April 13, 2021, Rodrigo announced the title, track listing and cover artwork of her debut studio album, Sour; the fourth track was titled "1 Step Forward, 3 Steps Back". On May 20, 2021, the personnel involved in the album were revealed on digital music platforms, in which Taylor Swift and Jack Antonoff were credited as songwriters on "1 Step Forward, 3 Steps Back". Rolling Stone reported that the song interpolates Swift's 2017 song "New Year's Day", which was written by Swift and Antonoff. Rodrigo has cited Swift as her biggest music inspiration and one of the core influences on Sour. The album was released on May 21, 2021, via retail stores, digital music and streaming platforms, as well as on Rodrigo's website.

== Composition and recording ==
"1 Step Forward, 3 Steps Back"
A sample of the final chorus in "1 Step Forward, 3 Steps Back", displaying Rodrigo's intimate vocals over soft piano keys and faint bass strums.

"1 Step Forward, 3 Steps Back" details the impact of inconsistent and unhealthy communication on a relationship, and the subject's mixed responses via text messages. It is a ballad led by a dampened piano with a descending chord progression. The song interpolates the piano chords from Swift's "New Year's Day", the final track of her sixth studio album, Reputation (2017). Rodrigo stated that she had the verse and chorus of "1 Step Forward, 3 Steps Back", and decided to play it over the chords of "New Year's Day", which she thought were "beautiful". The song is set in the key of D major with a slow tempo of 56 beats per minute. Rodrigo's vocals span from A_{3} to B_{4}. She created the song's hook from a text message, stating that she "thought it would be a cool way to describe this toxic, sort of manipulative relationship". The bird chirping heard at the beginning of the track was an idea by Dan Nigro, the song's producer and Rodrigo's musical collaborator on Sour, who recorded them through a window at his house. The song's title is inspired by the phrase "1 steps forward and 2 steps back", but replaces the 2 with 3, which has been associated with Swift's lucky number 13.

== Critical reception ==
Maura Johnston of Entertainment Weekly called the song a "regret-wracked" tune. The A.V. Club critic Tatiana Tenreyro wrote that "1 Step Forward, 3 Steps Back" blends Swift's influences with that of Regina Spektor, "inviting listeners who may have mourned failed romances while listening to Begin To Hope to feel nostalgic, while also allowing a new generation of teenagers to recognize themselves". Tenreyro added that the track "seamlessly transitions" into "Deja Vu", the succeeding track on Sour. NME's Rhian Daly said that "1 Step Forward, 3 Steps Back" is a "perfectly fine song" but leaves "little impression" due to its location between Rodrigo's familiar singles "Drivers License" and "Deja Vu".

Writing for The New York Times, Jon Caramanica asserted that the song, like its fellow tracks, perfects "the precise language for an imprecise, complex emotional situation; and working through private stories in public fashion." Pitchfork's Olivia Horn identified the song's "Swiftian" songwriting, in which Rodrigo "treats emotional turmoil like jet fuel, and laces her lyrics with specifics". Horn labelled it "dewy-eyed soft balladry à la Ingrid Michaelson". Chris DeVille, reviewing for Stereogum, said that "1 Step Forward, 3 Steps Forward" depicts "the strength of Rodrigo's conviction and her ability to condense universal frustrations into soundbites." Billboard writer Larisha Paul lauded the song's mature and confessional lyricism.

== Commercial performance ==
Following the release of Sour, all of the album's 11 tracks debuted on the Billboard Global 200, U.S. Hot 100, Canadian Hot 100, and Australian Singles charts, simultaneously. "1 Step Forward, 3 Steps Back" entered the Global 200 at number 17. It landed at numbers 17, 18 and 19 in Canada, Australia, and the United States, respectively. The song also reached numbers 26 and 28 in New Zealand and Portugal, respectively.

== Credits and personnel ==
Credits adapted from the liner notes of Sour.

Recording

- Recorded at Amusement Studios (Los Angeles)
- Mixed at SOTA Studios (Los Angeles)
- Mastered at Sterling Sound (New York City)

Personnel

- Olivia Rodrigo – vocals, backing vocals, songwriter, co-producer, piano
- Daniel Nigro – producer, recording engineer, organ, bass
- Taylor Swift – songwriter
- Jack Antonoff – songwriter
- Dan Viafore – assistant engineer
- Mitch McCarthy – mixing engineer
- Randy Merrill – mastering engineer

== Charts ==
Chart performance for "1 Step Forward, 3 Steps Back"
Chart (2021)	Peak position
Australia (ARIA)	18
Canada Hot 100 (Billboard)	17
Czech Republic Singles Digital (ČNS IFPI)	90
Global 200 (Billboard)	17
Greece (IFPI)	89
New Zealand (Recorded Music NZ)	26
Portugal (AFP)	28
Singapore (RIAS)	15
Slovakia Singles Digital (ČNS IFPI)	86
UK Audio Streaming (Official Charts)	19
US Billboard Hot 100	19

== Certifications ==
Certifications for "1 Step Forward, 3 Steps Back"
Region	Certification	Certified units/sales
Australia (ARIA)	2× Platinum	140,000^{‡}
Brazil (Pro-Música Brasil)	2× Platinum	80,000^{‡}
Canada (Music Canada)	3× Platinum	240,000^{‡}
Mexico (AMPROFON)	Gold	70,000^{‡}
New Zealand (RMNZ)	Platinum	30,000^{‡}
Spain (Promusicae)	Gold	30,000^{‡}
United Kingdom (BPI)	Platinum	600,000^{‡}
United States (RIAA)	Platinum	1,000,000^{‡}
^{‡} Sales+streaming figures based on certification alone.
