= Favorite Crime =

2021 song by Olivia Rodrigo

- Vevo's "Official Live Performance" cover

Song by Olivia Rodrigo

from the album Sour
- Written: September 2020
- Released: May 21, 2021
- Recorded: September 2020
- Studio: Amusement (Los Angeles)
- Genre: Folk-pop; indie pop; indie rock
- Length: 2:32
- Label: Geffen
- Songwriters: Olivia Rodrigo; Dan Nigro
- Producer: Dan Nigro

Lyric video
- "Favorite Crime" on YouTube

"Favorite Crime" (stylized in all lowercase) is a song recorded by American singer-songwriter Olivia Rodrigo. It is the tenth track on Rodrigo's debut album Sour, which was released on May 21, 2021, through Geffen Records. It is a folk-pop, indie pop, and indie rock ballad, written by Rodrigo and its producer Dan Nigro.

Upon release, the song charted within the top 10 in New Zealand and Ireland, and within the top 20 in Australia, Canada, the United Kingdom, and the United States. The song was also certified quadruple platinum in Canada, triple platinum in Australia and the United States, and double platinum in New Zealand. The song received its debut performance as part of Vevo's Lift series on May 25, 2021.

== Background and release ==
American singer-songwriter Olivia Rodrigo released her debut single "Drivers License" in January 2021, to critical acclaim. On April 1, 2021, Rodrigo announced that her debut album, at that time known by the placeholder title *O*R, was set to be released on May 21, 2021. On April 13, Rodrigo confirmed the album title to be Sour. Alongside the confirmation, the track listing was revealed, which included "Favorite Crime" as the tenth track.

"Favorite Crime" was released as part of Sour on May 21, 2021, alongside a lyric video.

== Composition ==
"Favorite Crime" was written by Rodrigo and Dan Nigro in 2020. The song is a stripped-down folk-pop, indie pop, and indie rock ballad. The song runs for a total length of 2 minutes and 32 seconds. The song features Rodrigo "singing over fingerpicked guitar figures in [a] sweetly folky style". The lyrics of the song center around "the examination of glaring red flags that only appear in their true colors through the lens of hindsight". The song has been compared to American singer-songwriter Taylor Swift's 2020 albums Folklore and Evermore, and the harmonies have been compared to that of New Zealand singer-songwriter Lorde's "Royals" (2013).

== Promotion ==
The song received its debut performance on May 25, 2021, as part of Vevo's Lift series. In the performance, Rodrigo sings the song while on a rooftop, alongside backup singers and a guitar player. Rodrigo performed the song on her 2022 Sour Tour, 2024-2025 Guts World Tour, and 2026-2027 Unraveled Tour.

== Commercial performance ==
In the United States, on the week dated June 5, 2021, "Favorite Crime" debuted at number 18 on the Billboard Hot 100, accompanied by 10 other tracks on Sour. The following week, it rose to number 16. It fell to number 26 on the week dated June 19 and number 43 the following week. It has spent a total of 11 weeks on the chart. On the Rolling Stone Top 100, it was one of nine songs on Sour to chart in the top 10, debuting at number 8, selling 166,800 units with 20.8 million streams in its first week. It rose to number 6 the next week, with 149,100 units sold and 18.8 million streams; it has spent 11 weeks on the Rolling Stone Top 100 and is still currently charting as of August 2021. It debuted at number 8 on the Streaming Songs chart, where it eventually peaked at number 6. Internationally, it peaked at number 6 in New Zealand, number 8 in Ireland, number 13 in Australia, 14 in Canada, 17 in the United Kingdom, 21 in Norway, and 76 in Sweden. The song also peaked at number 14 on Billboard's Global 200 chart. "Favorite Crime" has been certified quintuple platinum in Canada and triple platinum in Australia, New Zealand, and the United States.

== Critical reception ==
Bobby Oliver, writing for Spin, described "Favorite Crime" as "superb" and "showstopp[ing]", while Maura Johnston of Entertainment Weekly labelled the harmonies as "spectral". However, Billboard critic Larisha Paul ranked the song last out of all 11 songs on Sour.

== Credits and personnel ==
Credits were adapted from the liner notes of Sour and Tidal.

=== Recording ===
- Recorded at Amusement Studios (Los Angeles)
- Mixed at SOTA Studios (Los Angeles)
- Mastered at Sterling Sound (New York City)

=== Personnel ===
- Olivia Rodrigo – vocals, songwriting, vocal arrangement
- Dan Nigro – songwriting, production, recording, vocal arrangement, acoustic guitar, bass, Juno 60
- Randy Merrill – mastering
- Mitch McCarthy – mixing
- Ryan Linvill – saxophone, assistant engineering
- Kathleen – vocal arrangement

== Charts ==
=== Weekly charts ===
Weekly chart performance for "Favorite Crime"
Chart (2021)	Peak position
Australia (ARIA)	13
Canada Hot 100 (Billboard)	14
Global 200 (Billboard)	14
Greece (IFPI)	34
Ireland (IRMA)	8
Netherlands (Single Top 100)	47
New Zealand (Recorded Music NZ)	6
Norway (VG-lista)	21
Portugal (AFP)	13
Singapore (RIAS)	16
Slovakia Singles Digital (ČNS IFPI)	84
Sweden (Sverigetopplistan)	76
UK Singles (Official Charts)	17
US Billboard Hot 100	16
US Rolling Stone Top 100	6

=== Year-end charts ===
Year-end chart performance for "Favorite Crime"
Chart (2021)	Position
Global 200 (Billboard)	130
Portugal (AFP)	111

== Certifications ==
Certifications for "Favorite Crime"
Region	Certification	Certified units/sales
Australia (ARIA)	3× Platinum	210,000^{‡}
Austria (IFPI Austria)	Platinum	30,000^{‡}
Brazil (Pro-Música Brasil)	Diamond	160,000^{‡}
Canada (Music Canada)	5× Platinum	400,000^{‡}
Denmark (IFPI Danmark)	Gold	45,000^{‡}
France (SNEP)	Gold	100,000^{‡}
Mexico (AMPROFON)	2× Platinum+Gold	350,000^{‡}
New Zealand (RMNZ)	3× Platinum	90,000^{‡}
Norway (IFPI Norway)	Gold	30,000^{‡}
Poland (ZPAV)	Platinum	50,000^{‡}
Portugal (AFP)	Gold	5,000^{‡}
Spain (Promusicae)	Platinum	60,000^{‡}
United Kingdom (BPI)	Platinum	600,000^{‡}
United States (RIAA)	3× Platinum	3,000,000^{‡}
^{‡} Sales+streaming figures based on certification alone.
