= Deja Vu (Olivia Rodrigo song) =

2021 single by Olivia Rodrigo

Single by Olivia Rodrigo

from the album Sour
- Written: August 2020
- Released: April 1, 2021
- Recorded: 2020
- Studio: Amusement (Los Angeles); Heavy Duty (Burbank)
- Genre: Alternative rock; alternative pop; art pop; art rock; folk-pop; indie pop; pop rock; psychedelic pop
- Length: 3:35
- Label: Geffen; Interscope
- Songwriters: Olivia Rodrigo; Dan Nigro; Taylor Swift; Jack Antonoff; St. Vincent
- Producer: Dan Nigro

Olivia Rodrigo singles chronology
"Drivers License" (2021)	"Deja Vu" (2021)	"Good 4 U" (2021)

Music video
- "Deja Vu" on YouTube

"Deja Vu" (stylized in all lowercase) is a song by American singer-songwriter Olivia Rodrigo. It was released on April 1, 2021, through Geffen and Interscope Records, as the second single from her debut studio album, Sour (2021). Rodrigo wrote the song with its producer Dan Nigro, with Taylor Swift, Jack Antonoff, and St. Vincent receiving writing credits for its interpolation of Swift's 2019 song "Cruel Summer". An incorporation of various pop and rock sub-genres, "Deja Vu" explores themes of nostalgia, heartbreak, and the complexity of moving on from a past relationship. Olivia Rodrigo reflects on the memories associated with her previous relationship and the struggle to let go even as she acknowledges that the new couple is creating their own memories.

"Deja Vu" received acclaim from music critics, many of whom considered it a strong follow-up to "Drivers License" (2021) and praised its lyrics. In the United States, the song debuted at number eight on the Billboard Hot 100 and made Rodrigo the first artist to debut their first two singles in the chart's top 10. It eventually peaked at number three. "Deja Vu" reached the top 10 in Ireland, Australia, Malaysia, New Zealand, Singapore, Canada, Latvia, the United Kingdom, Portugal, and the Czech Republic.

Allie Avital directed the music video for "Deja Vu", filmed in Malibu, California, which was referenced in the song. It shows how the place she is at the moment can be nostalgic and remind her of previous relationships. Rodrigo performed the song on shows such as MTV Push and Billboard Women in Music, and included it on the set lists for her 2022 Sour concert tour, the Glastonbury Festival, and the 2024 Guts World Tour.

== Background ==
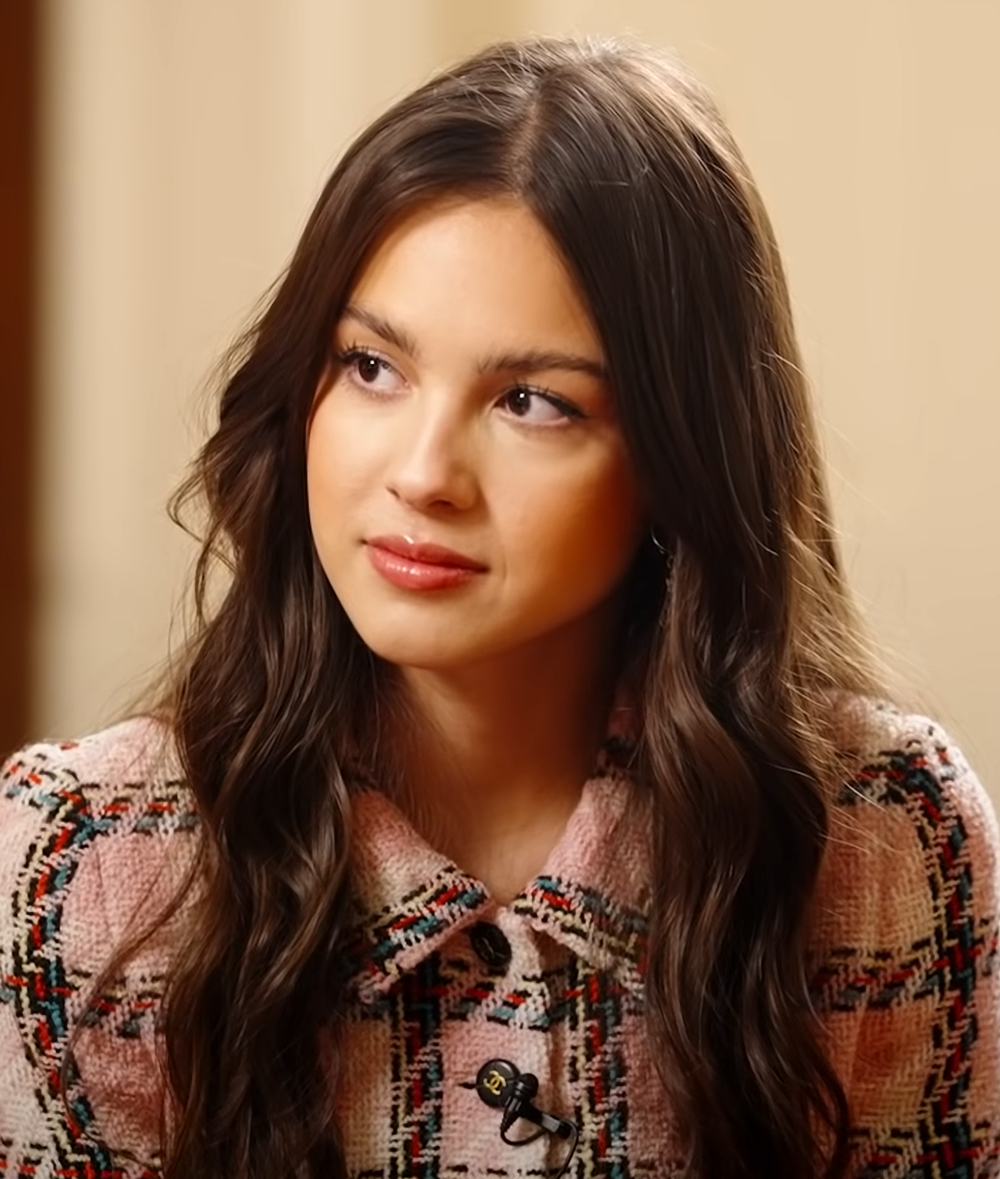
Olivia Rodrigo (pictured in 2021) co-wrote "Deja Vu", which was inspired by a note she made in her phone.

Olivia Rodrigo began meeting with record labels in early 2020, and subsequently signed with Geffen Records and Interscope Records, intending to release her debut extended play in 2021. American songwriter and producer Dan Nigro encountered a video of her performing her then-unreleased song "Happier" and was impressed by her vocals, stating, "her voice is insane". He contacted Rodrigo suggesting they make music together. Their plans were initially delayed due to the onset of the COVID-19 pandemic, but the two began working on music at Nigro's home studio a few months later. Rodrigo and Nigro co-wrote the song "Drivers License" in July 2020, which she released as her debut single in January 2021, to unprecedented commercial success. Billboard declared it one of the "most dominant" hits in Hot 100 history.

Rodrigo and Nigro wrote "Deja Vu" over the course of one day in August 2020, a month after "Drivers License" was written. The song was inspired by a lyric idea she had stored in the notes application on her phone: "When she was with you do you get deja vu?". Rodrigo elaborated on its concept: "I get déjà vu all the time. So I thought it would be a cool play on words to use déjà vu as a metaphor for this very universal thing that happens when you break up with someone and they get with somebody else, and see them living the life that you lived". The recording of "Deja Vu" went on over several months as she rerecorded her vocals and brainstormed new melodies. The song's bridge was influenced by Taylor Swift's 2019 song "Cruel Summer". Rodrigo and Nigro considered introducing electronic dance music-influenced vocal chops into its post-chorus, but opted for a synthesizer riff instead as Rodrigo thought the former were "too poppy".

Rodrigo began hinting the release of a new song by deleting posts from her Instagram account and sharing cryptic teasers of it in late March 2021. On March 29, she revealed its title, "Deja Vu", artwork, and release date. Rodrigo chose "Deja Vu" as her second single as she considered it a "natural progression" from "Drivers License", displaying her versatility as an artist: "I can make heartbreak songs but I can also make cool alternative pop songs. I didn't want to be pigeonholed into the 'heartbreak ballad girl' thing." She posted three clips preceding the announcement, featuring a melting ice cream cone, drifting clouds, and a car being driven along the ocean. In an interview with MTV News, Rodrigo stated that the song was "definitely not like 'Drivers License' at all", and was excited and nervous about her audience viewing a different aspect of her artistry on it. Geffen Records released it for digital download and streaming on April 1, 2021, as the second single from her debut studio album Sour (2021). Interscope Records sent "Deja Vu" to contemporary hit radio stations in the United States five days later, and for radio airplay in Italy on April 23. In July 2021, Swift, Jack Antonoff, and St. Vincent, the writers of "Cruel Summer", received writing credits on "Deja Vu" for its interpolation of the former. This followed Swift and Antonoff previously being credited on Sour's fourth track "1 Step Forward, 3 Steps Back" for interpolating their 2017 song "New Year's Day", and preceded the members of Paramore receiving credits on "Good 4 U" (2021). Critics have also noted similarities with Radiohead's 1997 single "No Surprises".

On June 25, 2026, "Deja Vu" was added as a Jam Track to Fortnite Festival, along with "Drop Dead" and "Maggots for Brains", as part of Rodrigo's collaboration with Fortnite.

== Composition ==
"Deja Vu" is 3 minutes and 35 seconds long. Nigro produced and recorded the song at Amusement Studios in Los Angeles. He handled drum programming, and plays the acoustic guitar, electric guitar, Wurlitzer, bass, Juno-60, and percussion, Jam City plays the organ and guitar, and Ryan Linvill plays the flute and saxophone. Sterling Laws recorded the drum at Heavy Duty Studios in Burbank, and Chris Kaych and Jasmine Chen handled drum engineering. Mitch McCarthy mixed it at SOTA Studios in Los Angeles and Randy Merrill mastered it at Sterling Sound in New York City.

"Deja Vu" is a midtempo alternative rock, alternative pop, art pop, art rock, folk-pop, indie pop, pop rock, and psychedelic pop song. The song is set over a piano instrumental, complemented by the glockenspiel and heavy drums after the pre-chorus. It also includes buoyant synths. "Deja Vu" has a sensitive beat that crests into an expansive bridge according to Entertainment Weekly's Marcus Jones. Rodrigo delivers harmonious vocals over the song's bell sounds and faded electronics; The Observer's Michael Cragg thought its whispered vocals recalled Lorde. The song's similarity with "Cruel Summer" occurs during the bridge, where she emulates the "angry-chanty thing" from Swift's newer songs according to Variety's Chris Willman. Bobby Olivier of Spin thought that with the "attention [it] paid to quotable and cresting bridges", both songs concluded on a similar note, and The Guardian's Rachel Aroesti described "Deja Vu" as a "Taylor Swiftian" pop song.

"Deja Vu" has lyrics about heartbreak. Throughout the song, Rodrigo addresses a past partner who is currently pursuing a different relationship and recalls how they are repeating things he did with Rodrigo, like driving up the California coast, eating strawberry ice cream, trading jackets, watching reruns of Glee, and listening to Billy Joel's 1983 single "Uptown Girl". She expresses anguish about him recycling jokes she told. Over its hook, Rodrigo sarcastically wonders if he ever accidentally addresses his new girlfriend by her name. By the conclusion of "Deja Vu", she begins contemplating that the experiences she shared with him, perhaps, were not original to begin with: "I hate to think that I was just your type." Entertainment Weekly's Maura Johnston described the song as "a gauzy fantasia with a time-blackened heart" and a "venom-filled diatribe toward an ex who's moved on". Writing for The New York Times, Jon Caramanica identified its lyrics as "plain and pinpoint pained", and the "power struggle over who taught who about cool music" as an element reminiscent of Swift as well.

== Critical reception ==
"Deja Vu" received acclaim from music critics, many of whom perceived it as a strong follow-up to "Drivers License". Stereogum's Tom Breihan commended the song's stylistic change of pace from Rodrigo's debut single, describing it as a "giddy, stomping pop banger with a euphoric-singalong chorus", although he also noted their similar subject matter. Tatiana Tenreyro of The A.V. Club lauded it as an improvement, stating that it was a remarkable and sparkling track that "feels like a marriage between Taylor Swift and Radiohead". Writing for NME, Rhian Daly called "Deja Vu" an illustrious follow-up, and Rolling Stone's Angie Martoccio and Chicago Tribune thought it dispelled any notion that she was going to be a one-hit wonder.

Quinn Moreland of Pitchfork stated that with "Deja Vu", Rodrigo proved to be "pop music's next heavyweight", complimenting its gratifyingly enmeshing production, and deemed it an audacious and poignant catharsis. Cragg described the song as an outstanding and lyrically sharp "kiss-off", and writing for Exclaim!, Heather Taylor-Singh opined that it is mesmerizing and "displays the nuances of young love". Pitchfork's Olivia Horn wrote that she uses her emotional turbulence like jet fuel on it and praised its specific lyrics. Caramanica thought Rodrigo captured the torment of collapse, and the apprehension of watching your old partner reassemble. Craig Jenkins of New York thought "Deja Vu" worthy of immediately being placed in a "hall of fame". Writing for DIY, Jenessa Williams called "Deja Vu" the "perfect bedfellow to Conan Gray's 'Heather'", and described it as a "'don't know what you're missing' fantasy that thrives under chunky drums and painfully relatable snark". AllMusic's Heather Phares viewed "shades of Alanis Morissette's jagged, jilted younger woman in [the song's] hyper-literate litany of tarnished memories".

Some publications included "Deja Vu" in their list of the 100 best songs of 2021. Rob Sheffield placed the song at number two, and deemed it the finest and most underrated among Rodrigo's successful releases that year, establishing her as the "pop savant of the moment". He was highly enthusiastic about its "Uptown Girl" reference: "It's a perfect ride on the pop time machine". Pitchfork included "Deja Vu" at number 10, and Jenn Pelly stated that despite the chart success of "Drivers License", "Deja Vu" heralded Rodrigo's emergence as an artist. She noted her earnest umbrage over her ex and his partner's trivial activities, and declared that "in the drama of [the song,] Olivia is directing". NPR listed it at number 20, and Lyndsey McKenna stated that despite the interpolation, "the track is all Rodrigo: a sharp send-off of an earworm, somehow delivered with both irreverent playfulness and brute force". In 2023 rankings of Rodrigo's discography, Sheffield named "Deja Vu" her best song and Jessie Atkinson called it her fifth best.

== Commercial performance ==
"Deja Vu" debuted at number eight on the US Billboard Hot 100 issued for April 17, 2021, making Rodrigo the first artist to debut their first two singles in the chart's top 10. (Note: Billboard classifies "Drivers License" and "Deja Vu" as Rodrigo's first two "proper" singles. Rodrigo had previously released several songs as promotional singles.) Upon Sour's release, the song peaked at number three on the chart issued for June 5, 2021, and received a 4× Platinum certification from the Recording Industry Association of America. On the Canadian Hot 100, it charted at number four, and Music Canada certified it 8× Platinum. "Deja Vu" reached number four in the United Kingdom, and earned a double Platinum certification from the British Phonographic Industry.

In Australia, "Deja Vu" peaked at number three, and the Australian Recording Industry Association certified it 6× Platinum. The song appeared at number 33 on the Triple J Hottest 100, 2021, alongside four other songs from Sour. It charted at number three in New Zealand, and received a quadruple Platinum certification from Recorded Music NZ. "Deja Vu" reached the top 20 of national record charts, at number two in Ireland; number three in Malaysia and Singapore; number four in Latvia; number five in Portugal; number 10 in the Czech Republic; number 11 in South Africa; number 15 in India; number 17 in Lebanon, Lithuania, and Norway; and number 19 in Greece, Hungary, and Slovakia. The song earned a double Platinum certification in Poland, a Platinum in Norway, and Portugal; and Gold in Denmark, Italy, and Sweden.

== Music video ==
Allie Avital directed the music video for "Deja Vu", which was released on April 1, 2021. Talia Ryder makes a cameo in it.

In the video, Rodrigo drives up the Pacific Coast Highway in a headscarf reminiscent of those worn by actresses in Alfred Hitchcock's films. She reaches home and tries on the same green gown as Ryder, and faces the latter's reflection in the mirror. Rodrigo realizes the similarities between her ex-partner's former relationship with her and his present one with Ryder. She initially tries to be happy for her and smiles, but eventually gets angry and breaks television sets with a sledgehammer. According to People's Darlene Aderoju, it depicts "the emotional journey that a heartbroken lover experiences when their ex officially moves on with someone else".

== Live performances ==
Rodrigo's performance of "Deja Vu" for MTV Push was published online on May 1, 2021. She reprised the song during her Tiny Desk Concert in a department of motor vehicles in December 2021. Rodrigo sang it in a pink dress for Billboard Women in Music on March 2, 2022. She was accompanied by a four-piece, all-female band in all-white outfits during the pre-filmed performance. Billboard's Andrew Unterberger remarked that Rodrigo displayed typically vulnerable intimacy and bluntness and offered an alternately pleasant and grimy rendition. She included "Deja Vu" in the set list for her 2022 Sour concert tour. Rodrigo performed the song at the Glastonbury Festival 2022. She introduced it by saying "I just wanted to ask you guys a question, does anyone here ever get deja vu?", which The Guardian's Laura Snapes thought highlighted the cacophony between her more impromptu and planned moments during the show. Rodrigo reprised "Deja Vu" as a duet, with Billy Joel on piano, during one of the latter's Billy Joel in Concert shows, followed by "Uptown Girl". She included the song on the set list of her 2024 concert tour, the Guts World Tour, where NME's Thomas Smith considered it a highlight. Rodrigo sang it for FireAid at the Intuit Dome in Inglewood, California on January 30, 2025, and at Lollapalooza Chile two months later.

== Credits and personnel ==
Credits adapted from the liner notes of Sour and Tidal.

Studio locations

- Recorded at Amusement Studios (Los Angeles)
- Drums recorded at Heavy Duty Studios (Burbank)
- Mixed at SOTA Studios (Los Angeles)
- Mastered at Sterling Sound (New York City)

Personnel

- Olivia Rodrigo – vocals, backing vocals, songwriting
- Daniel Nigro – songwriting, production, recording, acoustic guitar, electric guitar, Wurlitzer, bass, drum programming, Juno 60, backing vocals, percussion
- Taylor Swift – songwriting, interpolation
- Jack Antonoff – songwriting, interpolation
- Annie Clark – songwriting, interpolation
- Dan Viafore – assistant engineering
- Jam City – organ, guitar
- Ryan Linvill – flute, saxophone
- Sterling Laws – drum recording
- Chis Kaych – drum engineering
- Jasmine Chen – drum engineering
- Mitch McCarthy – mixing
- Randy Merrill – mastering

== Charts ==
=== Weekly charts ===
Weekly chart performance
Chart (2021)	Peak position
Argentina Hot 100 (Billboard)	57
Australia (ARIA)	3
Austria (Ö3 Austria Top 40)	25
Belgium (Ultratop 50 Flanders)	49
Canada Hot 100 (Billboard)	4
Canada CHR/Top 40 (Billboard)	19
Canada Hot AC (Billboard)	28
Croatia (HRT)	79
Czech Republic Singles Digital (ČNS IFPI)	10
Denmark (Tracklisten)	24
France (SNEP)	131
Germany (GfK)	55
Global 200 (Billboard)	3
Greece (IFPI)	19
Hungary (Stream Top 40)	19
Iceland (Tónlistinn)	30
India International Singles (IMI)	15
Ireland (IRMA)	2
Japan (Japan Hot 100)	79
Latvia (EHR)	4
Lebanon (OLT20)	17
Lithuania (AGATA)	17
Malaysia (RIM)	3
Netherlands (Single Top 100)	33
New Zealand (Recorded Music NZ)	3
Norway (VG-lista)	17
Portugal (AFP)	5
Romania (Airplay 100)	79
Singapore (RIAS)	3
Slovakia (Singles Digitál Top 100)	19
South Africa (RISA)	11
Spain (Promusicae)	56
Sweden (Sverigetopplistan)	46
Switzerland (Schweizer Hitparade)	35
UK Singles (Official Charts)	4
US Billboard Hot 100	3
US Adult Contemporary (Billboard)	19
US Adult Pop Airplay (Billboard)	5
US Dance Airplay (Billboard)	9
US Pop Airplay (Billboard)	2
Venezuela Airplay (Record Report)	39

Chart (2024–2025)	Peak position
Philippines (Philippines Hot 100)	65
Venezuela Airplay (Record Report)	84

=== Year-end charts ===
2021 year-end chart performance
Chart (2021)	Position
Australia (ARIA)	26
Brazil Streaming (Pro-Música Brasil)	158
Canada (Canadian Hot 100)	28
Chile (Monitor Latino)	91
Global 200 (Billboard)	27
Hungary (Stream Top 40)	93
Iceland (Tónlistinn)	76
Ireland (IRMA)	20
New Zealand (Recorded Music NZ)	28
Portugal (AFP)	50
Puerto Rico (Monitor Latino)	92
Switzerland (Schweizer Hitparade)	99
UK Singles (OCC)	32
US Billboard Hot 100	13
US Adult Top 40 (Billboard)	23
US Mainstream Top 40 (Billboard)	9

2022 year-end chart performance
Chart (2022)	Position
Global 200 (Billboard)	112

== Certifications ==
Certifications
Region	Certification	Certified units/sales
Australia (ARIA)	6× Platinum	420,000^{‡}
Austria (IFPI Austria)	Platinum	30,000^{‡}
Brazil (Pro-Música Brasil)	2× Diamond	320,000^{‡}
Canada (Music Canada)	8× Platinum	640,000^{‡}
Denmark (IFPI Danmark)	Gold	45,000^{‡}
France (SNEP)	Platinum	200,000^{‡}
Germany (BVMI)	Gold	300,000^{‡}
Italy (FIMI)	Gold	35,000^{‡}
Mexico (AMPROFON)	Diamond+2× Platinum+Gold	1,050,000^{‡}
New Zealand (RMNZ)	4× Platinum	120,000^{‡}
Norway (IFPI Norway)	Platinum	60,000^{‡}
Poland (ZPAV)	2× Platinum	100,000^{‡}
Portugal (AFP)	Platinum	10,000^{‡}
Spain (Promusicae)	Platinum	60,000^{‡}
United Kingdom (BPI)	2× Platinum	1,200,000^{‡}
United States (RIAA)	4× Platinum	4,000,000^{‡}
Streaming
Sweden (GLF)	Gold	4,000,000^{†}
^{‡} Sales+streaming figures based on certification alone.^{†} Streaming-only figures based on certification alone.

== Release history ==
Release dates and formats
Region	Date	Format(s)	Label	Ref.
Various	April 1, 2021	Digital download; streaming	Geffen	
United States	April 6, 2021	Contemporary hit radio	Interscope	
Italy	April 23, 2021	Radio airplay	Universal	
