= Checkmate (Conan Gray song) =

Single by Conan Gray

from the album Kid Krow
- Released: June 26, 2019
- Genre: Indie pop
- Length: 2:28
- Label: Republic
- Songwriter: Conan Gray
- Producer: Dan Nigro

Conan Gray singles chronology
"The King" (2019)	"Checkmate" (2019)	"Comfort Crowd" (2019)

Music video
- "Checkmate" on YouTube

"Checkmate" is a song by American singer Conan Gray, released as a single on June 26, 2019, through Republic Records. It was written by Gray and produced by Dan Nigro.

== Background and release ==
After breaking out with his debut extended play (EP) in November 2018, and releasing the single "The King" in March 2019, Gray would usher in a new period of his music career with the release of "Checkmate". He recalled having "ugly cried out" the song in under five minutes while alone in his bedroom. Gray mentioned this songwriting process in a tweet and stating "Dedicated to the asshole who was always playing games with my lil heart >:( [sic]".

On June 23, only a few days before releasing the track, Gray teased "Checkmate" through a tweet that featured the song's title and a short snippet of the chorus. "Checkmate" was officially released on June 26, as the lead single to his debut studio album Kid Krow, which was released the following March.

== Composition and lyrics ==
Produced by Dan Nigro, the track features "percussive flares". The song beings slightly muffled and accompanied by guitar, as well as a crescendoing percussion. This muffled sound abruptly stops ahead of a transition to the first verse.

Written by Gray, the song was inspired by a person he was romantically interested in but was having his emotions played around with by. As such, Gray called "Checkmate" a signal of him being done with the "games" they were playing. He stated he wrote the song in the stage of grief highlighted by rage and in a moment of him feeling "pure seething anger". The song's chorus leans into the metaphor of romantically "playing games", alluding to a checkmate: "Cause I've gotten tired of the games that you play/ When you tell me you love me then you throw me away/ So cry me a river 'til you drown in a lake/ 'Cause you may think you're winning but checkmate".

== Reception ==
Kirsten Spruch of Billboard called the song's chorus "explosive" and its melody twists "surprising". In analyzing Gray's long-term viability as a pop singer, Billboard's Jason Lipshutz stated "Checkmate" has the "type of harmonic flourishes and emotional vulnerability that can be traced back to those two pop savants", referencing Taylor Swift and Lorde. Maxamillion Polo of Ones to Watch wrote that the track is "nothing short of euphoric, surging forward with an undeniable frenzied energy", as well as "a moment of pop-punk-tinged ecstasy".

== Music video ==
A hand-drawn lyric video accompanied the single's release on June 26. Later, on July 25, a music video for "Checkmate" was released on YouTube. It has accumulated over 10 million views, as of December 2023. The music video's setting evokes imagery relating to late 1990s and early 2000s nostalgia. It follows Gray continuing with vengeful themes, with him stating that he "tried to get as much of [his] cathartic revenge out" in the music video.
