= Everything Is Embarrassing =

Single by Sky Ferreira

from the EP Ghost
- B-side: "Sad Dream"
- Released: April 16, 2013
- Studio: Heavy Duty (Los Angeles, California)
- Genre: Synth-pop; electropop; alternative pop
- Length: 4:09
- Label: Capitol; Polydor
- Songwriters: Sky Ferreira; Ariel Rechtshaid; Devonté Hynes
- Producer: Ariel Rechtshaid

Sky Ferreira singles chronology
"Red Lips" (2012)	"Everything Is Embarrassing" (2013)	"You're Not the One" (2013)

Music video
- "Everything Is Embarrassing" on YouTube

"Everything Is Embarrassing" is a song by American singer Sky Ferreira from her second extended play (EP), Ghost (2012). It was first premiered online on August 30, 2012, and was later released as a single on April 16, 2013, by Capitol Records in the United Kingdom and Ireland. The song was written by Ferreira, Ariel Rechtshaid, and Dev Hynes, while the latter two produced the track. An accompanying music video for "Everything Is Embarrassing" was directed by Grant Singer with no budget; it was premiered through Pitchfork on October 1, 2012, and sees Ferreira singing in various locations throughout Los Angeles.

"Everything Is Embarrassing" was widely acclaimed and hailed by music critics as one of the best songs of recent years. In 2015, Pitchfork placed the song at number 14 on its list of "The 200 Best Tracks of 2010–2014". In 2019, Pitchfork placed the song at number 12 on its list of "The 200 Best Songs of the 2010s".

== Composition ==
"Everything Is Embarrassing" is a synth-pop, electropop, dance-pop, alternative pop, and synth-rock ballad. It was written by Ferreira, Ariel Rechtshaid, and Dev Hynes, while the latter two produced and co-produced the track, respectively. Hynes, a former friend of Ferreira, had sent her a demo of the song, which was inspired by a failed relationship; Ferreira then modified the original lyrics and structure along with Rechtshaid.

== Release and promotion ==
=== Single release ===
With her debut studio album having been frequently delayed throughout the early 2010s, Ferreira released her second extended play Ghost on October 2, 2012, while simultaneously continuing production of her full-length record. "Everything Is Embarrassing" appears as the fifth of five songs on the track listing. The track was premiered through Pitchfork on August 30, 2012, and was later released as a single in the United Kingdom on April 16, 2013. It was later included on the compilation album Now That's What I Call Music! 46 compilation album, released on May 7, 2013. Remixes by Twin Shadow and Krystal Klear were released digitally on February 5 and March 25, 2013, respectively, while a remix by Unknown Mortal Orchestra was included on Ferreira's third extended play Night Time, My Time: B-Sides Part 1, released on November 25, 2013.

In her debut television performance, she performed the track on Late Night with Jimmy Fallon on January 7, 2013. She has also performed the track at the SXSW festival.

As of July 2013, "Everything Is Embarrassing" had sold 19,000 copies in the United States, according to Nielsen SoundScan. In Belgium, the song peaked at numbers 20 and 46 the Flanders and Wallonia Ultratip charts, respectively.

=== Media appearance ===
The main protagonist of the Special series on Netflix, Ryan Hayes (portrayed by Ryan O'Connell), in the first episode of season 2 says Sky Ferreira is his "diva of choice" and that "Everything Is Embarrassing" is "a perfect pop song." The song was featured in episode 5.

== Critical response ==
"Everything Is Embarrassing" was met with acclaim from music critics. The single was named "Best New Track" by Pitchfork the day following its premiere In his review of Ghost, Jon Caramanica of The New York Times called the song "counterintuitive and brilliant" and "one of the year's unlikely pop gems".

Several publications and music blogs listed the song among the best of 2012, including Pitchfork, The Guardian, the Los Angeles Times, Billboard, Spin, Fact, the Bangkok Post, and New York, the latter of which named it the best song of the year. It was placed at number fifteen in the 2012 Pazz & Jop critics' poll. In 2014, Pitchfork placed "Everything Is Embarrassing" at number 14 on its list of "The 200 Best Tracks of the Decade So Far (2010–2014)", writing: "[The song] is ostensibly a done-with-your-shit kiss-off, and it's a glorious one", adding "she might be ready to move on, but she's still feeling a million conflicting emotions, and few songs capture that internal strife as honestly and effortlessly as 'Everything Is Embarrassing' does."

== Legacy ==
In 2018, NPR ranked the track as the 149th greatest song by a female or nonbinary artist in the 21st century, saying:

Sky Ferreira's 'Everything Is Embarrassing' marked her first foray into pop stardom – by that point, the 20-year-old had a successful career as a model and actress, but this downtrodden dance-pop single produced by 1980s revisionists Dev Hynes and Ariel Rechtshaid ushered in a new musical moment. Ferreira's vocals are impossibly cool, fully embracing the humiliation of anxiety and unfulfilled romances. It's a song that submits to mundane mortifications, the sound of sweet suffering.

In 2019, Pitchfork ranked the song at number 12 on its list "The 200 Best Songs of the 2010s".

Blood Orange sampled the song in his 2026 single "Essex_Honey.mp3".

== Music video ==
Capitol Records requested that an accompanying music video for "Everything Is Embarrassing" with no budget be filmed following the track's online premiere; it was directed by Grant Singer, who had previously directed the clips for Ferreira's tracks "Sad Dream" and "Lost in My Bedroom", and was filmed in one day in Los Angeles before Ferreira was scheduled to depart for New York City shortly after. It was premiered through Pitchfork on October 1, 2012; the black-and-white clip sees Ferreira singing in various locations throughout the city, including a playground, on the Los Angeles Metro and the roof of the Capitol Records Building.

== Track listings ==
Digital download
No.	Title	Length
1.	"Everything Is Embarrassing"	4:09
2.	"Sad Dream"	3:34
3.	"Everything Is Embarrassing" (MK Remix)	5:55
4.	"Everything Is Embarrassing" (Unicorn Kid Remix)	3:31
Total length:		17:09

Digital download – Twin Shadow Remix
No.	Title	Length
1.	"Everything Is Embarrassing" (Twin Shadow Remix)	4:53
Total length:		4:53

Digital download – Krystal Klear Remix
No.	Title	Length
1.	"Everything Is Embarrassing" (Krystal Klear Remix)	6:13
2.	"Everything Is Embarrassing" (Krystal Klear Radio Edit)	3:37
3.	"Everything Is Embarrassing" (Krystal Klear Instrumental)	3:37
Total length:		13:27

== Credits and personnel ==
Credits adapted from the liner notes of Night Time, My Time: B-Sides Part 1.

=== Recording ===
- Recorded at Heavy Duty Studios (Los Angeles, California)
- Mixed at Eldorado Recording Studios (Burbank, California)
- Mastered at Capitol Mastering (Hollywood, California)

=== Personnel ===
- Sky Ferreira – vocals
- Ariel Rechtshaid – production, recording, keys
- Blood Orange – co-production, keys
- Rich Costey – mixing
- Chris Kasych – Pro Tools engineering
- Mark Santangelo – Pro Tools engineering assistance
- Nick Rowe – editing
- Kevin Bartley – mastering

== Charts ==
Chart (2014)	Peak position
Belgium (Ultratip Bubbling Under Flanders)	20
Belgium (Ultratip Bubbling Under Wallonia)	46

== Certifications ==
Certifications for Everything Is Embarrassing
Region	Certification	Certified units/sales
New Zealand (RMNZ)	Gold	15,000^{‡}
^{‡} Sales+streaming figures based on certification alone.

== Other cover versions ==
In 2021, British singer Will Young covered "Everything Is Embarrassing" on his album Crying on the Bathroom Floor.

== Release history ==
Region	Date	Format	Version	Label	Ref.
Worldwide	August 30, 2012	Online premiere	Single version	Capitol; Polydor	
United States	February 5, 2013	Digital download	Twin Shadow Remix	Capitol; Polydor	
United States	March 25, 2013	Digital download	Krystal Klear Remix	Capitol; Polydor	
United Kingdom	April 16, 2013	Digital download	Single version	Capitol; Polydor	
