= The Grudge (song) =

Song by Olivia Rodrigo

from the album Guts
- Released: September 8, 2023
- Studio: Amusement (Los Angeles)
- Genre: Pop
- Length: 3:09
- Label: Geffen
- Songwriters: Olivia Rodrigo; Dan Nigro
- Producer: Dan Nigro

Lyric video
- "The Grudge" on YouTube

"The Grudge" (stylized in all lowercase) is a song by American singer-songwriter Olivia Rodrigo from her second studio album, Guts (2023). Rodrigo wrote it with its producer, Dan Nigro. The song became available as the album's tenth track on September 8, 2023, when it was released by Geffen Records. A piano-driven power ballad, "The Grudge" details Rodrigo's regret and burnout after somebody she looked up to betrayed her trust. Critics varied in their interpretation of the song, with some interpreting its subject as the breakup of a romantic relationship while others believed it was about Rodrigo's relationship with Taylor Swift.

Some music critics were positive about the vulnerability, lyrics, and Rodrigo's vocal performance on "The Grudge", while others thought it was too melodramatic and self-centered. The song reached number six in Ireland and number 10 in New Zealand. It charted within the top 20 in Australia, Canada, and the United States and received platinum certifications in Brazil and Canada. She included "The Grudge" on the set list of her 2024 concert tour, the Guts World Tour.

== Background and release ==
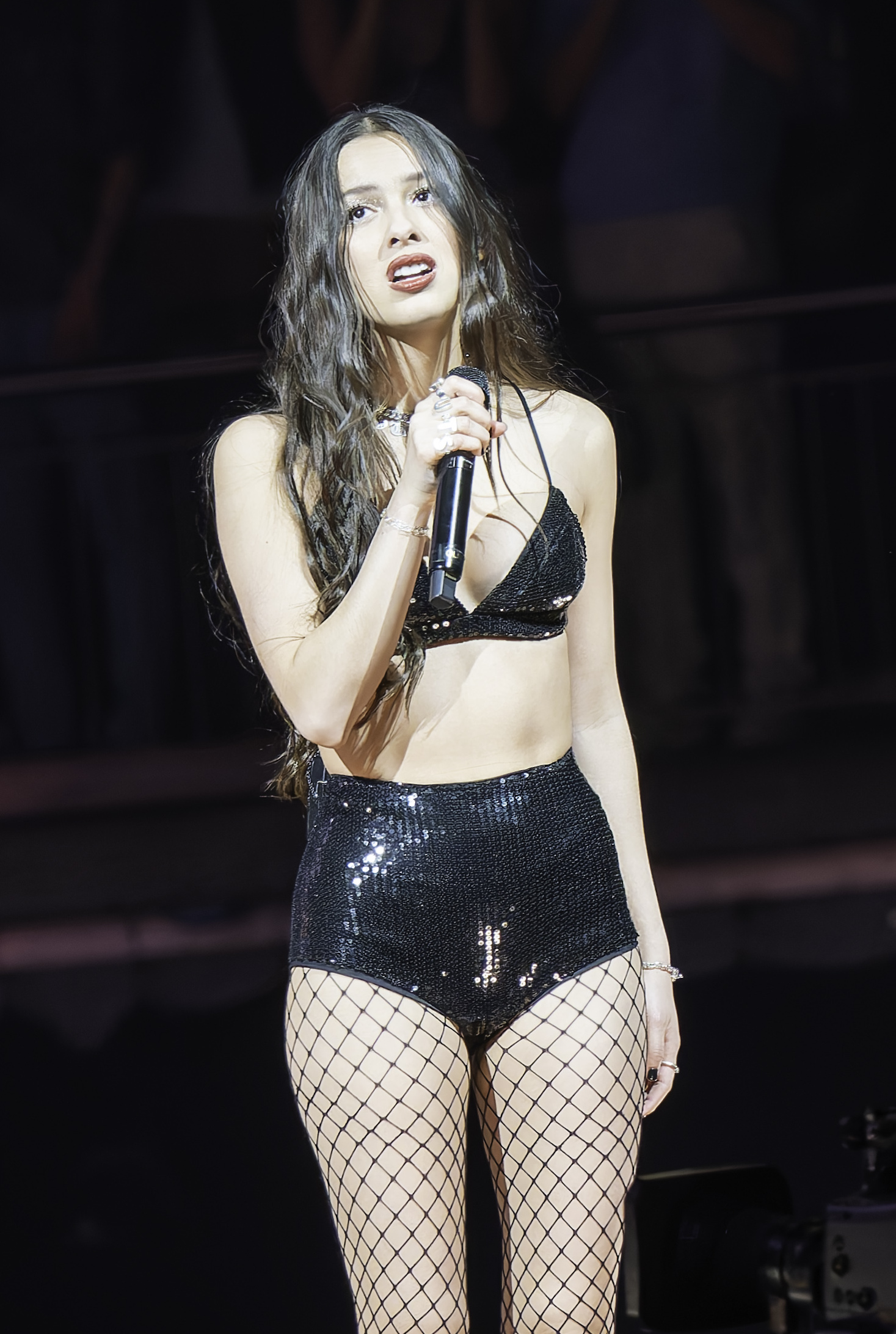
Olivia Rodrigo performing on the Guts World Tour in May 2024

Dan Nigro produced all of the tracks on Olivia Rodrigo's debut studio album, Sour (2021). Rodrigo publicly associated with Taylor Swift during the album's marketing, describing herself as "the biggest Swiftie in the whole world" in January 2021 and Swift as the "kindest individual in the whole world" two months later. Upon the album's release in May 2021, its track "1 Step Forward, 3 Steps Back" included an interpolation of Swift's song "New Year's Day" (2017). Two months later, Rodrigo gave Swift and the co-writers of her song "Cruel Summer" songwriting credits on her own single "Deja Vu" (2021) without an explanation. She later stated that "it was really frustrating to see people discredit and deny my creativity" and decreased her association with Swift.

Following the release of Sour, Rodrigo decided to take a break from songwriting for six months. She conceived the follow-up album, Guts (2023), at the age of 19, while experiencing "lots of confusion, mistakes, awkwardness & good old fashioned teen angst". One day, while commuting to the studio, Rodrigo found inspiration in a lyric by the Smiths about the courage it takes to be kind, prompting her to write down the words "It takes strength to forgive, but I don't feel very strong" in her phone's Notes application. Eventually included in a song called "The Grudge", Rodrigo and Nigro kept arguing about the melody that should accompany the line. After Nigro's changes to it for several weeks were met with disapproval from Rodrigo, they compromised and included two different choruses. The song was one of the few on Guts that Rodrigo cried while writing. Nigro produced every single track included on the album, which were the more rock-oriented songs, as Rodrigo felt they drew a bigger reaction from live audiences.

The album and its title were announced on June 26, 2023, and its lead single, "Vampire", was released four days later. Following fan speculation that the song was about Swift, Rodrigo stated that she was surprised and added: "I mean, I never want to say who any of my songs are about. I've never done that before in my career and probably won't." On August 1, 2023, she revealed Guts's tracklist, which featured "The Grudge" as the tenth track. The song became available for digital download on the album, which was released on September 8, 2023. Fans on Twitter theorized that its subject matter resembled the situation between Rodrigo and Swift, but Rodrigo stated that she did not "have beef with anyone" and only used the website to look at alien conspiracy theories. Rodrigo performed "The Grudge" at the Ace Hotel Los Angeles on October 9, 2023, in a concert exclusively for American Express cardholders. The song was also included on the set list of her 2024 concert tour, the Guts World Tour.

== Composition ==
"The Grudge"
"The Grudge" is a piano power ballad, on which Rodrigo recounts the subject's betrayal of her trust with a phone call she received from them in the month of May.

"The Grudge" is three minutes and nine seconds long. It was recorded at Amusement Studios in Los Angeles. Nigro provided production and vocal production, and he engineered the song with Ryan Linvill. He plays acoustic guitar, electric guitar, percussion, piano, bass, synthesizer, and mellotron and Linvill plays acoustic guitar, saxophone, bass, and synthesizer. Mitch McCarthy mixed the song at the Wheelhouse Studios in Vancouver, and Randy Merrill mastered it.

"The Grudge" is a piano power ballad, on which Rodrigo delivers high notes while exploring a high vocal range. The song was characterized as "whisper-core" by Ilana Kaplan of Spin. Primarily driven by a piano, its instrumentation also incorporates strings. Pitchfork's Cat Zhang believed she sang with "sky-scraping vocals", and Clash's Alex Berry thought she employed a "raw, raspy tone" along with a belting technique. Critics likened the piano-driven composition and wide-eyed astonishment of "The Grudge" to Rodrigo's 2021 single "Drivers License".

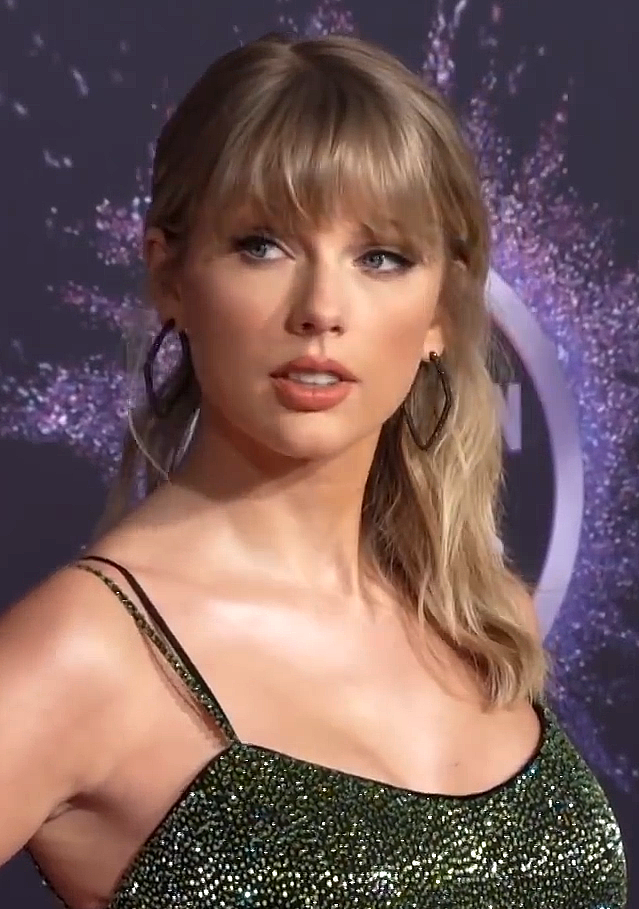
Some critics believed "The Grudge" was inspired by Rodrigo's relationship with Swift (pictured in 2019)

"The Grudge" details Rodrigo's regret and burnout after somebody she looked up to betrayed her trust. In the first verse, Rodrigo recalls how her entire life was affected after receiving a phone call from them during a Friday in May. She expresses anguish about the subject deceiving her and states that her confusion about the falling out of their relationship still continues. She hangs onto the incident and still thinks about it often. During the chorus, she confesses trying to forgive the person but not having the strength to do it. In the second verse, Rodrigo dreams that the subject is apologetic and wonders if their relations ended up being spoiled because the person was insecure about Rodrigo's success, reflecting on winning imaginary one-sided arguments with them. In the song's bridge, Rodrigo states that the subject outwardly acted supportive of Rodrigo's success but this was not genuine: "Ooh, your flowers filled with vitriol / You built me up to watch me fall." Rodrigo describes the subject as a successful person who has "everything and [they] still want more". Retrospectively reflecting on the deteriorated relationship, Rodrigo admits that despite everything that took place, they are "still everything" to her.

Critics varied in their interpretation of "The Grudge". Some believed the song was about Rodrigo facing rejection from a love interest or dealing with a difficult breakup in a romantic relationship. Writing for The New York Times, Jon Caramanica thought it was about her being on the negative side of a manipulative relationship. On the other hand, critics like the Los Angeles Times's Mikael Wood and The A.V. Club's Mary Kate Carr believed "The Grudge" was inspired by the situation between Rodrigo and Swift after the songwriting credits incident. Elle and Stephanie Soteriou of BuzzFeed News opined that the timeline of the phone call in the lyrics aligned with the release of Sour, which was a Friday in May 2021. The latter connected several of the song's lyrics to Swift: the lyric about Rodrigo feeling like she is "not enough" to others taking credit for her work, the one about her acting tough despite wanting to scream to how the credits were quietly given, "flowers filled with vitriol" to Swift's support for Rodrigo early on in her career, and "You have everything and you still want more" to Swift wanting the credits despite being more successful than Rodrigo.

== Critical reception ==
Some critics were positive about "The Grudge" and the other ballads on Guts. Rob Sheffield of Rolling Stone described the song as "one of the toughest, angriest, most fearsome power ballads" on the album, and Jessie Atkinson of GQ called it one of the record's numerous instances of profound vulnerability. Writing for MusicOMH, John Murphy favorably compared it to Lorde's second studio album, Melodrama (2017). Kaplan believed the ballads were Guts's standout tracks and demonstrated Rodrigo's versatility as a contemporary star.

Others were less enthusiastic about "The Grudge" and other ballads. Zhang believed they were not inherently bad but regurgitated Rodrigo's prior material compared to other tracks on Guts, which demonstrated a greater increase in self-awareness. Beats Per Minute's Lucas Martins and Billboard Philippines's Gabriel Saulog thought "The Grudge" was effective in capturing its lyrical theme and displayed good songwriting but did not compare to the high points of the album. Charles Lyons-Burt of Slant Magazine considered it a misstep and believed it leaned into "soapy melodrama" due to Rodrigo's self-centered storytelling. Spencer Kornhaber of The Atlantic believed the song was overly maudlin, generic, and one of the ballads where Rodrigo's straightforwardness can be vexing.

Various critics praised specific lyrics in "The Grudge". Martins believed the line about forgiveness requiring strength was a moment of humility that helped keep Guts grounded. Atkinson included "Do you think I deserved it all?" in her list of the album's standout and "gutsiest" lyrics, while Nylon's Steffanee Wang included "You have everything and you still want more" in her list of its most impeccable lyrics. Celia Almeida of Miami New Times listed the latter among Rodrigo's five most "scathing" lines. Sheffield ranked it as Rodrigo's 12th-best song in September 2023 and picked his favorite line: "We both drew blood, but man, those cuts were never equal."

Some critics praised Rodrigo's vocal performance on "The Grudge". Berry thought Rodrigo's vocal range was magnificent and best showcased on the downtempo tracks of Guts. Kaplan described her belting on "The Grudge" as "chilling", and Berry believed her gritty, coarse tone along with her fearless approach to belting established her as a noteworthy and anticipated talent in the current music scene. Billboard's Jason Lipshutz thought Rodrigo beautifully portrayed her vulnerability and delivered the song's final line hauntingly before it faded into nothingness.

== Commercial performance ==
"The Grudge" debuted at number 16 on the US Billboard Hot 100 issued for September 23, 2023. In Canada, the song entered at number 18 on the Canadian Hot 100 issued for the same date and was certified double platinum by Music Canada. It debuted at number 45 on the UK Singles Chart. "The Grudge" received a gold certification in the United Kingdom from the British Phonographic Industry, and the Official Charts Company declared it Rodrigo's 18th-biggest song in the country in February 2024.

In Australia, "The Grudge" entered at number 13. The song debuted at number 10 in New Zealand and became Rodrigo's 11th top 10 song. It charted at number 14 on the Billboard Global 200. "The Grudge" also reached national record charts at number 2 on the Sweden Heatseeker chart, number 6 in Ireland, number 35 in Greece, and number 48 in Portugal. The song received a platinum certification in Brazil.

== Credits and personnel ==
Credits are adapted from the liner notes of Guts.

- Dan Nigro – producer, songwriter, engineer, acoustic guitar, electric guitar, percussion, piano, vocal producer, bass, synthesizer, mellotron, background vocals
- Olivia Rodrigo – vocals, background vocals, songwriter
- Ryan Linvill – additional producer, engineer, acoustic guitar, saxophone, bass, synthesizer
- Randy Merrill – mastering
- Mitch McCarthy – mixing

== Charts ==
Chart performance for "The Grudge"
Chart (2023)	Peak position
Australia (ARIA)	13
Canada Hot 100 (Billboard)	18
Global 200 (Billboard)	14
Greece (IFPI)	35
Ireland (IRMA)	6
New Zealand (Recorded Music NZ)	10
Portugal (AFP)	48
Sweden Heatseeker (Sverigetopplistan)	2
UK Singles (Official Charts)	45
US Billboard Hot 100	16

== Certifications ==
Certifications for "The Grudge"
Region	Certification	Certified units/sales
Australia (ARIA)	Platinum	70,000^{‡}
Brazil (Pro-Música Brasil)	Platinum	40,000^{‡}
Canada (Music Canada)	2× Platinum	160,000^{‡}
New Zealand (RMNZ)	Gold	15,000^{‡}
United Kingdom (BPI)	Gold	400,000^{‡}
^{‡} Sales+streaming figures based on certification alone.
