= Wish You Were Sober =

2020 single by Conan Gray

Single by Conan Gray

from the album Kid Krow
- Released: March 18, 2020
- Genre: Alternative pop
- Length: 2:48
- Label: Republic Records
- Songwriters: Conan Gray; Dan Nigro
- Producer: Dan Nigro

Conan Gray singles chronology
"The Story" (2020)	"Wish You Were Sober" (2020)	"Heather" (2020)

Music video
- "Wish You Were Sober" on YouTube

"Wish You Were Sober" is a song by American singer-songwriter Conan Gray. It was released on March 18, 2020 by Republic Records as the fifth single from his debut studio album Kid Krow. The song was written by Conan Gray and Dan Nigro.

== Background ==
The song addresses the mistakes of Gray's teenage years, and acknowledges that "moments from young adult life aren't always remembered." The song focuses on a specific incident where Gray's love interest would confess their love for him whilst "black out drunk". The song was described as "the most straightforward pop song" on the album, and was praised by E! for its "confessional lyrics and the excellent alt-pop production."

== Music video ==
A music video to accompany the release of "Wish You Were Sober" was first released on YouTube on March 20, 2020. The video was directed by BRUME. The video was released with the album and gained over 400 thousand views in 48 hours.

== Composition and lyrics ==
On Apple Music Editor's Notes under Gray's album Kid Krow, Gray writes that "It's ["Wish You Were Sober"] a song that I ended up sticking on the album last minute ’cause it was so much fun when I was making it. I wrote it about this person who I really, really liked and I wrote a lot of songs on my album about them and they just wouldn't tell me that they liked me back or would never tell me their true feelings unless they were blackout drunk. It was a weird, bittersweet feeling, because on one side you're thinking, ‘Yay, they like me and they have feelings for me and they like me back.’ On the other side you're thinking, ‘Why can't you tell me this when you're sober? Why can't you tell me this in daylight?’ I think the song is about all those mixed emotions and all the craziness behind being young and getting super drunk and calling someone and telling them that you love them.”

== Critical reception ==
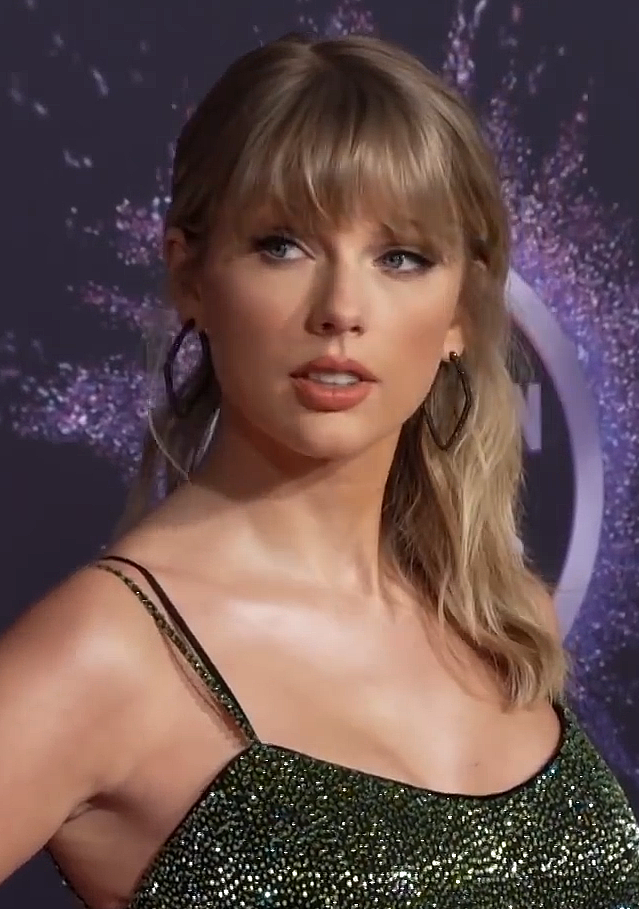
"Wish You Were Sober" received praise and a shoutout from singer Taylor Swift.

Helen Ehrlich from Affinity Magazine declared that "'Wish You Were Sober' is the song that plays in a coming of age film after the main character completely claims their identity. 'Wish You Were Sober' is the sensation of bursting out of a party, onto the front porch and out into the cool night. 'Wish You Were Sober' is a breath of fresh air."

Taylor Swift praised "Wish You Were Sober" on Instagram, stating it was her favorite song off Kid Krow. In her story, Swift wrote; "Obsessed with this whole album. but this song ["Wish You Were Sober"] right here is a masterpiece. Not trying to be loud but this will be on repeat for my whole life. Volume all the way up." Gray responded via Twitter, writing; "Thank you for being my lifelong songwriting inspiration and icon. I honestly feel like you raised me both as a writer and a human and I cannot express in words how much this means to me. Thank you for everything. Swiftie for life."

== Credits and personnel ==
Credits adapted from Tidal.

- Dan Nigro – producer, composer, lyricist, associated performer, bass, drum programming, electric guitar, engineer, keyboards, mix engineer, studio personnel, synthesizer
- Conan Gray – composer, lyricist, associated performer, background vocalist, vocals
- Serban Ghenea – mixer, studio personnel
- John Hanes – studio personnel

== Charts ==
Chart (2020)	Peak position
New Zealand Hot Singles (RMNZ)	14

== Certifications ==
Certifications for "Wish You Were Sober"
Region	Certification	Certified units/sales
Australia (ARIA)	Gold	35,000^{‡}
Brazil (Pro-Música Brasil)	Platinum	40,000^{‡}
New Zealand (RMNZ)	Gold	15,000^{‡}
United States (RIAA)	Gold	500,000^{‡}
^{‡} Sales+streaming figures based on certification alone.

== Release history ==
Region	Date	Format	Label
United States	March 18, 2020	Digital download; streaming	Republic Records
