= Maniac (Conan Gray song) =

2019 single by Conan Gray

Single by Conan Gray

from the album Kid Krow
- A-side: "Heather"
- Released: October 24, 2019
- Genre: Pop; indie pop; synth-pop
- Length: 3:05
- Label: Republic
- Songwriters: Conan Gray; Dan Nigro
- Producer: Dan Nigro

Conan Gray singles chronology
"Comfort Crowd" (2019)	"Maniac" (2019)	"The Story" (2020)

Music video
- "Conan Gray - Maniac" on YouTube

"Maniac" is a song by American singer-songwriter Conan Gray. Republic Records released it as the third single from his debut studio album Kid Krow on October 24, 2019. "Maniac" was written by Gray and Dan Nigro, who also produced the song. The song has been certified Platinum in Australia, Brazil, Canada and the United States, becoming his first certifications in all four countries. In early 2020, the song was successful on international mainstream pop radio. It had gained 50 million accumulative streams on Spotify by January 2020, before clocking 90 million streams only two months later. In January 2026, it surpassed 1 billion streams. The song also trended on the video-sharing platform TikTok, debuting in the app's Top 25 trending chart.

== Composition and lyrics ==
Gray wrote "Maniac" in the shower after receiving a sobbing text message from an ex-lover at midnight. The ex had supposedly been spreading rumors about how Gray was "some freak who wouldn't leave them alone" he continues, "when in reality, they were the freak." He referred to the song as "a cathartic post break-up song dedicated to psychotic exes." Madeline Roth of MTV described the song as "a total '80s fever dream, marked by shimmering synths and Gray's quirky lyrics about a fickle ex who leaves him simultaneously amused and hurt."

== Music video ==
In the BRUME-directed music video for "Maniac", Gray and English actress Jessica Barden are working the night shift at the theatre/cinema before they fend off her psychotic ex-boyfriends who have risen from the dead. Roth said that the "cinematic" music video pays homage to horror classics such as Dawn of the Dead (1978) and Zombieland (2009). Released on YouTube, the video has accumulated over 92 million views, as of November 2023.

== Critical reception ==
Helen Ehrlich of Affinity Magazine described "Maniac" as "an eye roll and a smirk" that is "retro, raw and rage-filled." The song features "magnetizing pop synths, a stimulating dance-hall bass, and Gray's energizing vocals". Despite being officially released in October 2019, "Maniac" was included on Billboard's mid-year list of The 50 Best Songs of 2020.

== Charts ==
=== Weekly charts ===
Chart (2020)	Peak position
Australia (ARIA)	24
Belgium (Ultratip Bubbling Under Flanders)	41
Ireland (IRMA)	83
Lithuania (AGATA)	68
New Zealand Hot Singles (RMNZ)	29
Poland Airplay (ZPAV)	48
South Korea (Gaon)	44
US Bubbling Under Hot 100 (Billboard)	25
US Pop Airplay (Billboard)	38

=== Year-end charts ===
Chart (2020)	Position
Australia (ARIA)	65

Chart (2021)	Position
South Korea (Gaon)	110

== Certifications ==
Region	Certification	Certified units/sales
Australia (ARIA)	4× Platinum	280,000^{‡}
Brazil (Pro-Música Brasil)	Diamond	160,000^{‡}
Canada (Music Canada)	3× Platinum	240,000^{‡}
New Zealand (RMNZ)	2× Platinum	60,000^{‡}
Poland (ZPAV)	Platinum	50,000^{‡}
Portugal (AFP)	Gold	5,000^{‡}
Spain (Promusicae)	Gold	30,000^{‡}
United Kingdom (BPI)	Gold	400,000^{‡}
United States (RIAA)	3× Platinum	3,000,000^{‡}
Streaming
South Korea (KMCA)	Platinum	100,000,000^{†}
^{‡} Sales+streaming figures based on certification alone.^{†} Streaming-only figures based on certification alone.

== Release history ==
Region	Date	Format	Label	Ref.
Various	October 25, 2019	Digital download; streaming	Republic	
United States	February 18, 2020	Contemporary hit radio	Republic	
