= U + Me = ＜3 =

"U + Me = <3"

Song by Olivia Rodrigo

from the album You Seem Pretty Sad for a Girl So in Love
- Released: June 12, 2026
- Genre: Jangle pop; pop rock; dream pop; indie pop; indie rock; new wave
- Length: 4:07 (original version); 3:48 (album vinyl/cassette version)
- Label: Geffen
- Songwriters: Olivia Rodrigo; Dan Nigro
- Producer: Dan Nigro

Lyric video
- "U + Me = <3" on YouTube

"U + Me = <3" (stylized in all lowercase, pronounced "you plus me equals a heart") is a song by the American singer-songwriter Olivia Rodrigo from her third studio album, You Seem Pretty Sad for a Girl So in Love. It was released as the album's fifth track on June 12, 2026, by Geffen Records. Rodrigo wrote the song with its producer, Dan Nigro.

"U + Me = <3" has been described as a goth rock-inflected jangle pop, pop rock, dream pop, indie pop, indie rock, and new wave track. The song finds Rodrigo being optimistic and hopeful in her new relationship, unaware of the unpredictable nature of love and disregarding her friends' advices. Rodrigo included "U + Me = <3" on the set list of the Unraveled Tour (2026–2027).

== Background and promotion ==
In March 2026, Olivia Rodrigo described the thematic direction of her third studio album in an interview with British Vogue. She stated that the album predominantly features "sad love songs", explaining that many of her favorite romantic tracks derive their appeal from an undercurrent of fear or longing. The album takes inspiration from Rodrigo's time in London. Multiple tracks on the album are said to reference the relationship of Sex and the City characters Miranda Hobbes and Steve Brady. On April 2, 2026, the album title was unveiled after being painted on a pink wall in Los Angeles and hinted with the final word in the album title in many cities. Rodrigo continued her collaboration with Dan Nigro, who returned to be the album's producer. Rodrigo released "Drop Dead" as the lead single on April 17, 2026. A second song from the album, called "Begged", was performed on Saturday Night Live on May 2, 2026.

Speaking of the album's conception and the influence of Sex and the City on the tracks, Rodrigo stated: "Like, when Miranda and Steve are getting back together, she's crying. 'Steve, anytime something funny happens, I just want to tell you.' And I remember watching that and being like, 'Oh, my God, I have to write a song about this.'" You Seem Pretty Sad for a Girl So in Love features thirteen tracks, of which "U + Me = <3" appears as the fifth. It was included on the set list of the Unraveled Tour, which commenced on September 25, 2026, in Hartford, United States.

== Composition ==
"U + Me = <3" is a goth rock-inflected jangle pop, pop rock, dream pop, indie pop, indie rock, and new wave song that is four minutes and seven seconds long. Hazel Cills of NPR likened the dream pop soundscape to that of the Cure's "most romantic numbers." Produced by Dan Nigro, the song was written by Rodrigo and Nigro, with Nigro also contributing acoustic guitar, bass, drum programming, engineering, and additional programming. Additional contributions include Michael Harris (additional engineering), Jack Doutt (assistant mastering engineering), Ben Romans (CP-70 and piano), Sterling Laws (drums), Sam Stewart (guitar), Bryn Bliska (programming), Mike Bozzi (mastering), and Mitch McCarthy (mixing), with vocals performed by Rodrigo and background vocals by both Rodrigo and Nigro.

The lyrics of "U + Me = <3" portray Rodrigo expressing unabashed devotion towards her romantic partner and imagining a lasting future together. She professes her affection for various aspects of his personality and life, including his "floppy hair", older sister, and taste in British chocolate, while declaring that she hopes their relationship will endure despite the inevitability of change. The chorus centers on the phrase "you plus me equals a heart forever", which reflects the song's title and conveys her desire for lifelong commitment. Critics described the lyrics as an earnest celebration of being in love and noted that they contain several personal details about the subject.

== Critical reception ==
Hannah Dailey of Billboard ranked it at as the third-best song on You Seem Pretty Sad for a Girl So in Love, stating that it "has one of the most addictive melodies in Rodrigo's discography, catchy and fun and playful as she decides to go all in on the admittedly naive bet that she and her lover really are soulmates whose love will last forever. This is the only moment on the album where Rodrigo fully throws caution to the wind, having decided that the person she’s singing to is worth the risk". Julyssa Lopez of Rolling Stone noted that she is "blindly hopeful" on the song. Alex Rigotti of NME wrote that she "fights to prove she's the best girlfriend – paired with the best boyfriend ever" on the song.

== Commercial performance ==
"U + Me = <3" debuted at number 19 on the US Billboard Hot 100 issued for June 27, 2026. In Canada, the song entered at number 19 on the Canadian Hot 100 on the chart for the same date. In the United Kingdom, it debuted at number 17 on the Official Audio Streaming Chart. In Australia, "U + Me = <3" debuted at number 16. The song entered at number 15 in New Zealand. It debuted at number 13 on the Billboard Global 200. "U + Me = <3" also charted at number 7 on Sweden Heatseeker, number 11 in Singapore, number 23 in Hong Kong, and Portugal, number 80 in Germany, and number 95 on the Brasil Hot 100.

== Credits and personnel ==
These credits were adapted from Pitchfork.

- Olivia Rodrigo – vocals, songwriting, background vocals
- Dan Nigro – production, songwriting, acoustic guitar, bass, drum programming, engineering, background vocals, programming
- Sam Stewart – guitar
- Sterling Laws – drums
- Ben Romans – CP-70, piano
- Bryn Bliska – programming
- Michael Harris – additional engineering
- Jack Doutt – assistant mastering engineering
- Mitch McCarthy – mixing
- Mike Bozzi – mastering

== Charts ==
Chart (2026)	Peak position
Argentina Hot 100 (Billboard)	86
Australia (ARIA)	16
Brazil Hot 100 (Billboard)	95
Canada Hot 100 (Billboard)	19
Germany (GfK)	80
Global 200 (Billboard)	13
Hong Kong (Billboard)	23
New Zealand (Recorded Music NZ)	15
Panama Streaming (PRODUCE)	140
Philippines Hot 100 (Billboard Philippines)	18
Portugal (AFP)	23
Singapore (RIAS)	11
Spain (Promusicae)	66
Sweden Heatseeker (Sverigetopplistan)	7
UK Streaming (OCC)	17
US Billboard Hot 100	19
US Hot Rock & Alternative Songs (Billboard)	6
