= Can't Break Me Down =

2014 song by Billy Idol

Single by Billy Idol

from the album Kings & Queens of the Underground
- Released: 15 September 2014
- Genre: Pop rock
- Length: 3:42
- Label: BFI
- Songwriters: Billy Idol; Greg Kurstin; Daniel Nigro
- Producer: Greg Kurstin

Billy Idol singles chronology
"John Wayne" (2008)	"Can't Break Me Down" (2014)	"Save Me Now" (2014)

Music video
- "Can't Break Me Down" on YouTube

"Can't Break Me Down" is a song by the English rock singer Billy Idol, released in 2014 as the only single from his eighth studio album Kings & Queens of the Underground. His first charting song in almost a decade, the last being 2005's "Scream", it reached No. 15 on the Adult Alternative Songs chart.

== Background ==
"Can't Break Me Down" was recorded at Greg Kurstins' home studio, Echo Studios, in Los Angeles. In a 2014 update for his official website, Idol said it was "a fun song to record". The song was released as the lead single from Kings & Queens of the Underground and was made available as an instant download with all iTunes and Amazon pre-orders of the album from 26 August 2014.

== Music video ==
The song's music video was directed by Jason Trucco and produced by Niv Gat and Dana Lustig for Atlantis Pictures. It was shot at Santa Clarita Studios in Valencia, California and stars Idol, Izabella Miko and Ryan Heffington, with the latter also serving as the video's choreographer. Described as an "allegorical noir story of love gone wrong", the video is based on the finale of the 1947 American film noir The Lady from Shanghai. As the protagonist, Idol plays a version of Orson Welles' character from the film. The video premiered on YouTube on 23 October 2014.

== Critical reception ==
USA Today selected "Can't Break Me Down" as their "song of the week" during September 2014. Writer Brian Mansfield described it as being in Idol's "classic style" and noted its "punkish drive, sneering vocals and roaring guitar". He felt the song would have served as a "great follow-up" to Idol's 1987 hit "Mony Mony" or his 1990 hit "Cradle of Love". In a review of Kings & Queens of the Underground, Kory Grow of Rolling Stone praised it as a "carefree" and "punky pop tune". He felt that the song's "bang bang bang" chorus was "catchier than anything Fall Out Boy have written lately".

== Personnel ==
Musicians

- Billy Idol – lead vocals
- Steve Stevens – guitar
- Greg Kurstin – bass, drums, guitar, keyboards

Production

- Greg Kurstin – producer, engineer, mix engineer
- Alex Pasco – engineer
- Julian Burg – additional engineering

== Charts ==
Chart (2014)	Peak position
US Adult Alternative Airplay (Billboard)	15
