= You're Not the One =

2013 single by Sky Ferreira

Single by Sky Ferreira

from the album Night Time, My Time
- Released: September 24, 2013
- Recorded: 2012
- Studio: Heavy Duty (Los Angeles, California)
- Genre: Indie rock; electropop
- Length: 3:57
- Label: Capitol
- Songwriters: Sky Ferreira; Ariel Rechtshaid; Justin Raisen; Daniel Nigro
- Producer: Ariel Rechtshaid

Sky Ferreira singles chronology
"Everything Is Embarrassing" (2013)	"You're Not the One" (2013)	"I Blame Myself" (2014)

Music video
- "You're Not the One" on YouTube

"You're Not the One" is a song by American singer Sky Ferreira from her debut studio album, Night Time, My Time (2013). The song was written and produced by Ariel Rechtshaid and Justin Raisen, with additional songwriting provided by Ferreira and Daniel Nigro. It was released as the album's lead single on September 24, 2013, by Capitol Records.

The song was well-received by critics, who cited it as a standout track from its parent album and praised its overall sound. Grant Singer directed a music video for the track, which was released in September 2013. The song has been performed by Ferreira on several live events, some of which were television shows.

== Background ==
"You're Not the One" was written in 2012, at a time when—according to Ferreira—she "was in a different headspace". "I had been dating someone for three years, since I was 17, and that person guarded me from everything", she said. Ferreira explained that her life was essentially limited to modelling, crafting songs and "watch[ing] TV", which resulted in her not having a "chance to discover [her]self."

The track was recorded in 2013 by Ariel Rechtshaid at Heavy Duty Studios in Los Angeles. Rechtshaid and Justin Raisen produced the track, contributed towards its instrumentation and provided background vocals for the song. The two played the keyboard while they were accompanied by Daniel Nigro when playing the electric guitar; Rechtshaid played the bass and Garrett Ray helmed the drums. During post-production, David Schiffman mixed the song and Emily Lazar mastered it.

During a July 2013 interview with Glamour, Ferreira announced that the track would serve as the lead single from an upcoming extended play—which ultimately became her debut album Night Time, My Time. The single cover for "You're Not the One" was revealed on September 9, 2013, and the song itself was released 15 days later, on September 24. An official remix of the track by producer Cid Rim was released online in March 2014; a commercial release of that remix, packaged with three others in a digital EP format, followed in June. In 2015, the Blood Diamonds remix of the song was featured in the commercial for Jimmy Choo's fragrance Illicit.

== Composition ==
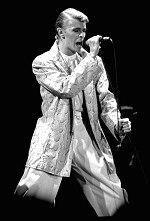
While recording the song, Ferreira was inspired by the works of David Bowie

"You're Not the One" displays a fusion of pop and indie rock styles while incorporating electropop as well. Ferreira stated that she conceptualized the track as a "super-poppy version" of David Bowie's eleventh studio album Low (1977); she was told that the song itself resembles the works of singer-songwriter Siouxsie Sioux. Its instrumentation is marked by the mixture of pounding, "crude" percussion and electric guitar riffs, accompanied with "tinny six-stringer scrapes". Annie Zaleski of The A.V. Club described its sonority as having "gothic overtones" and being a "homage" to the "late-80s" works of band The Cure.

The songs' lyrics were written by Ferreira, Rechtshaid, Raisen and Nigro; they depict a relationship in which two love partners do not express sufficient mutual interest, due to the fact that they do not pursue each other. The Washington Post's Lavanya Ramanathan dubbed the song a "breakup tune" and wrote that in it, Ferreira embodies a teenager with "guy problems". For CMJ, Brooke Segarra billed the track as a "sexually assertive" number and interpreted the song's lyrical theme as listing the "mistakes and shortcomings" that come "with sex". Elias Leight of PopMatters wrote that a recurring theme in the album—also represented in "You're Not the One"—is Ferreira's "rejection of the opposite sex".

The song's official remix, produced by Cid Rim, removes the "pop rock" edge of the song in favor of an electronica and hip hop-influenced sound. In this version, the verses display handclaps underneath Ferreira's vocals, which are more pitched than in the original and "cut up" as well. Carl Williott of Idolator billed it as "an intriguing listen".

== Critical reception ==
"You're Not the One" received positive feedback from contemporary music critics. Heather Phares of AllMusic selected the song as one of Night Time, My Time's stronger tracks, as did Digital Spy's Lewis Corner; the latter elaborated that it "continues the premise that [Ferreira] has finally emerged as an artist who knows what she wants". Bryant Kitching from Consequence of Sound deemed it a musical highlight from the album. Comparing the song's guitar-led opening to "Johnny Marr on a sugar rush", he also called it the album's "most rewarding moment". Writing for magazine Spin, Marc Hogan echoed praise for the song—he described it as "impressively catchy and emotionally communicative" and also said it was "the type of track that might inspire a label to green-light—finally—her debut album". musicOMH's Nina Bertok highlighted the song's mixture of genres and catchiness, and also praised the "killer" chorus. The staff of The Guardian listed "You're Not the One" as the eighteenth best track of 2013, whereas Melissa Locker of Time, who made a similar list, included the song as the nineteenth best of that year.

== Music video ==
The official music video for "You're Not the One" was directed by Grant Singer, and written and co-produced by V magazine senior editor Patrik Sandberg. Ferreira announced plans to shoot a visual for the track in July 2013, and stated that Singer would direct it. According to Singer, the video took nine months to craft; it was originally supposed to be filmed in Berlin so it had a "Christiane F. vibe", however this did not occur for unknown reasons. Sandberg suggested the twist ending and the use of an ice pick, which he thought should be used as a "narrative tool" instead of just a prop. Singer described the overall video as "sinister and pop". The video was filmed at The Lash, a nightclub in Los Angeles, where Ferreira is seen dancing in front of multicolored lasers.

The video begins with Ferreira walking towards a blue projector screen, wearing black sunglasses, a black jacket and a transparent, fishnet-pattern top. Ferreira stops and removes the jacket slowly as a group of voyeurs observes her. During her act, she continuously looks towards a man with shades and long hair, who sips a drink while watching Ferreira. Outside the nightclub, she is seen again with that man—her apparent love interest—as they kiss each other and involve themselves physically. They reencounter in a black room where Ferreira sticks an ice pick on his face; in response, he slaps her, to which she smiles and they start kissing again. After they reenter the nightclub, another man whispers in her ear, while this catches her love interest's attention, implying jealousy if not competition. The latter walks away and finds the woman he arrived with whom he starts dancing and kissing, much to Ferreira's sadness. The next morning, she wakes up in a grass field with red marks on her face while holding the ice pick, which is now covered in blood. In a different setting, the man, who is lying on a bed, sees his stomach cut with the word "not", dripping blood as well. Spin's Marc Hogan found the video too "focused on Ferreira's model" abilities to "complement the song effectively".

== Live performances ==
Ferreira had already been performing "You're Not the One" before its formal release—at her concert on the last day of the 2013 Pitchfork Music Festival, she sang it as the ninth track of her setlist. After the song's digital release, she promoted it on television shows and radio lounges. On November 26, 2013 she sang the track during an appearance on Late Show with David Letterman, where she wore "opaque black sunglasses" and a black blazer over a "sheer top". Ferreira, who opened the American leg of Miley Cyrus' Bangerz Tour, included the song in her setlist for those concerts. On February 27, 2014—as she was on an interruption from the tour—Ferreira performed the song on Jimmy Kimmel Live. Dressed in a leather jacket, shades and with her hair wet, she was praised by Ben Kaye from Consequence of Sound for her "dazzling rendition" of the song. "You're Not the One" was later performed on March 12 of that year on a BBC Radio 1 session.

== Track listings ==
- Digital download
1. "You're Not the One" – 3:55
- Digital EP – remixes
1. "You're Not the One" (Little Daylight Remix) – 3:38
2. "You're Not the One" (Cid Rim Remix) – 4:06
3. "You're Not the One" (Blood Diamonds Remix) – 3:29
4. "You're Not the One" (Benny Cassette Mix) – 3:23

== Credits and personnel ==
Credits adapted from the liner notes of Night Time, My Time.

=== Recording ===
- Recorded at Heavy Duty Studios (Los Angeles, California)
- Mastered at The Lodge (New York City)

=== Personnel ===
- Sky Ferreira – vocals
- Ariel Rechtshaid – production, additional vocals, keyboards, guitar, bass
- Justin Raisen – co-production, additional vocals, keyboards, guitar
- Daniel Nigro – additional vocals, guitar
- Garrett Ray – drums
- Nick Rowe – editing
- David Schiffman – mixing
- Chris Kasych – Pro Tools engineering
- Mark Santangelo – Pro Tools engineering assistance
- Emily Lazar – mastering
- Rich Morales – mastering assistance

== Release history ==
Region	Date	Format	Version	Label	Ref.
Canada	September 24, 2013	Digital download	Single	Capitol	
United States	September 24, 2013	Digital download	Single	Capitol	
Australia	December 6, 2013	Digital download	Single	Polydor	
New Zealand	December 6, 2013	Digital download	Single	Polydor	
France	January 19, 2014	Digital download	Single	Capitol Music France	
United Kingdom	January 19, 2014	Digital download	Single	Polydor	
Canada	June 3, 2014	Digital download	Remixes EP	Capitol	
United States	June 3, 2014	Digital download	Remixes EP	Capitol	
