= Kid Krow =

2020 album by Conan Gray

Studio album by Conan Gray
- Released: March 20, 2020
- Recorded: 2019
- Studios: Amusement Studios, Los Angeles
- Genre: Indie pop
- Length: 33:33
- Label: Republic
- Producers: Dan Nigro; Conan Gray; Captain Cuts; Jam City

Conan Gray chronology
Sunset Season (2018)	Kid Krow (2020)	Superache (2022)

Singles from Kid Krow
- 1. "Checkmate" Released: June 26, 2019; 2. "Comfort Crowd" Released: September 5, 2019; 3. "Maniac" Released: October 25, 2019; 4. "The Story" Released: January 10, 2020; 5. "Wish You Were Sober" Released: March 18, 2020; 6. "Heather" Released: September 4, 2020

Kid Krow is the debut studio album by American singer-songwriter Conan Gray. It was released on March 20, 2020, through Republic Records. The album is a "coming of age" record inspired by elements such as his rough childhood experiences of poverty, abuse, and discrimination. The album was supported by the singles "Checkmate", "Comfort Crowd", "Maniac", "The Story", "Wish You Were Sober", and "Heather".

Kid Krow received positive reviews from music critics for its production, songwriting and Gray's vocal performance. Commercially, it debuted at number five on the US Billboard 200. The album received a boost in sales and re-entered the charts of several countries when its track "Heather" became a sleeper hit after gaining popularity on the online platform TikTok.

== Background and composition ==
Gray told People that the album was inspired by his "pretty rough" childhood in Texas, explaining

When you're young, it's really hard to imagine life not always being hard. I lived in a really unsafe household, and life just wasn't very good for me. And so, as a kid, I was just like, there's no way that I'm gonna make it, there's no way that I'm going to survive or there's no way that there's going to be anything more to my life than just dealing with pain.

Gray told Teen Vogue that growing up as a child of mixed race in Texas affected who he is as a person, as he felt that "he didn't really belong anywhere." He told Clash:

The record is a study of how I perceive the world. I talk a lot about my friends and people I've met touring over the past year. It's me. I'm not the coolest person, but the album is me accepting the fact I'm weird and I don't need to be anybody else. It's also a chance to encourage others to embrace who they are and be unapologetic about it.

== Songs and videos ==
Gray wrote "Comfort Crowd" whilst experiencing loneliness after moving to Los Angeles for college and leaving his friends behind in Texas. He told Paper, "I just really needed some company, that kinda company that didn't require attention. That kinda company with someone who you're so close to, you don't need to say a single word to fill the 'uncomfortable' silence." In the music video which has nearly 6 million views, Gray is alone in an abandoned house, where he eventually manages to kill and bury a clone of himself. The cinematic music video features "horror-style setups of shovels and nosebleeds". In a press release he said

I knew I wanted the video to evoke that mood; being alone with someone. Almost like spending time with yourself— so that's how the video was born. I think that anyone in their adolescence can relate to feeling like they're constantly having to kill themselves off and rebuild from scratch, so I wanted to make commentary on that theme as well. That's what I wrote 'Comfort Crowd' about.

"Wish You Were Sober" is a song that addresses the mistakes of Gray's teenage years, and acknowledges that "moments from young adult life aren't always remembered." The song focuses on a specific incident where Gray's love interest would confess their love for him whilst "black out drunk". The song was described as "the most straightforward pop song" on the album, and was praised by E! for its "confessional lyrics and the excellent alt-pop production." The song's music video was released with the album and gained over 400 thousand views in 48 hours.

Gray described "Maniac" as "a cathartic post break-up song dedicated to psychotic exes." In the song's music video, Gray and English actress Jessica Barden are busy working the night shift at the theatre/cinema before they fend off her psychotic ex-boyfriends who have risen from the dead. Madeline Roth said that the "cinematic" music video pays homage to horror classics such as Dawn of the Dead (1978) and Zombieland (2009).

The album's first interlude, "(Online Love)", is a "tenuous" 36-second sound bite of Gray singing in a near-whisper over acoustic guitar about the subject between parentheses. "Checkmate" is inspired by one of Gray's ex-lovers who had been "playing around" with his heart, which only made Gray want to take revenge on them. "If you're going to treat love like it's a game, then I'm going to win the game," Gray told the Grammys. In the song's music video, Gray tries to get as much "cathartic revenge" as he can, forcing him to kidnap the people who cheat on him, and further send them to a deserted island to starve to death, "because, I mean, what else am I supposed to do?" The video clip has gained over 3.4 million videos on YouTube.

"The Cut That Always Bleeds" is a "melodramatic break-up ballad" about a person that keeps breaking Gray's heart despite how much it tries to heal. He told Apple Music, "[This person was] this cut on my body that I was trying so hard to let heal over and they would just come back in and it would just bleed and bleed and bleed." In "Fight or Flight", Gray is hurt because he has been made a fool. He sings "Fight or flight, I'd rather die than cry in front of you. / Fight or flight, I'd rather lie than tell you I'm in love with you," over loud guitars which bring some "pretty gritty climaxes." Gray grew up in a poor family and often experienced nights without meals. He told Apple Music:

I grew up with financial ups and downs my whole entire life. We didn't know how we were going to survive, and I was so used to not having money that when I was young, I always thought that money would solve all of my issues. Then I moved to LA and I discovered this whole other side of the world where there's these kids who grew up insanely rich. I started hanging out with them and going to their parties and seeing this other side of the world, and I discovered that even these people who grew up with tons of money are absolutely miserable. I figured out that it doesn't matter who you are, doesn't matter how much money you have. We all have a lot of the same problems.

In the second interlude, "(Can We Be Friends)", Gray sings "If anyone fucks with you I'll knock their teeth out" with a sense of "Sufjan Stevens intimacy." In "Heather" Gray divulges his envy of Heather, the girl who is loved by the person he likes. Piper Westrom of Riff wrote, "Gray's fearlessness when addressing sensitive subjects such as [unrequited romantic interest from male heterosexual friends] on his debut album show a bravery that someone so young does not always show so early in his career." In the song's music video Gray reflects on himself trying to become the idolized "Heather." Critics described the video as "an intimate visualization" of Gray as he "fluctuates between feminine and masculine beauty standards." Rania Aniftos of Billboard described the video as "thought-provoking". The song "Little League" focuses on how Gray wishes to go back in time to "the simpler days". He addresses the joy of youth and the lack of ability to appreciate past experiences as they took place.

In "The Story", Gray opens up about his difficult childhood in third person perspective. He has told an audience, "It's one of the ones that means more to me.... I like to tell stories and this song is kind of a story about my life when it was before all of [my fame]." The song is based upon "all the unfair things that he's seen in this world, from the effects of bullying and self-hatred to a fear of being your 100 percent authentic self." Gray also references a number of experiences that he and his friends had as a child, including "a boy and a girl" who are now "gone, headstones on a lawn," as well as "a boy and a boy" who were "best friends with each other, but always wished they were more". Mike Wass from Idolator described "The Story" as a "stripped-back anthem about the state of the world, and the way it could be with a little more love and acceptance." In the song's music video, Gray wanders along deserted outdoor landscapes before jumping on the back of a pickup truck. Jordan Tilchen from MTV wrote, "he seems despondent and like he's lost hope as he roams lonely dirt roads, he knows that it's 'not the end of the story.'"

== Critical reception ==
Professional ratings
Review scores
Source	Rating
AllMusic	4/5 stars
DIY	3.5/5 stars
Dork	4/5 stars

Kid Krow was met with generally positive reviews from critics after its release. Brendan Wetmore from Paper wrote, "At just 21 years old, [Gray] has managed to package the nostalgic loves, lusts, fears and triumphs of his peers into a 30-minute calming storm. Grab your tissues." Matt Collar of AllMusic wrote, "Even at Gray's most yearning and emotionally wrought moments, he's got the charisma to get you singing along." Piper Westrom of Riff wrote, "Tackling subjects that others wouldn't touch while balancing personal testimonials, Gray displays a mental serenity within his songs that project a bright future." Katy Mayfield of Paste described Kid Krow as "an album about the hurt and loneliness of reluctantly trying this whole 'love' thing but never letting yourself believe it'll do anything but hurt you," noting that "few of Gray's moments of vulnerability on [the record] come without an edge, whether that's self-hatred for said vulnerability or angry impulses to lash out at the pain-inducing object." Will Strickson of DIY described the album as "a collection of catchy choruses, big harmonies and lyrics straight out of a high school drama," and noted that "[Gray's] music is drawn from raw emotion and not a business plan, [which] makes it clear why he's already well on his way to being a 2020 icon." Gabe Bergado of Teen Vogue wrote that the album "shows off Conan's sonic versatility, the throughline being his thoughtful, vulnerable lyrics." Tobi Akingbade of NME reiterated colleague Sophie Williams' 2019 statement: "Gray glosses over millennial ennui with an innate, laid back charm; dreams are made and hearts are broken as he navigates the woes of adolescence with wistful nuance."

The album was noted to have drawn striking similarities to works by Lorde and Taylor Swift, two of Gray's biggest inspirations. Taylor Swift reacted to the album on her personal Instagram story, writing: "Obsessed with this whole album, but THIS SONG ["Wish You Were Sober"] RIGHT HERE is a masterpiece. Not trying to be loud but this will be on repeat for my whole life." Gray responded to Swift's statement in all caps: "Thank you for being my lifelong songwriting inspiration and icon. I honestly feel like you raised me both as a writer and a human and I cannot express in words how much the means to me. Thank you for everything. Swifty for life."

== Release and promotion ==
Throughout the latter half of 2019, Gray released the singles as well as the accompanying music videos for "Checkmate", Comfort Crowd", "Maniac". In October 2019, he embarked on his Comfort Crowd Tour of North America with support from acclaimed New Zealand musician Benee as well as American recording artist UMI. The music video for "Maniac" featured an appearance from English actress Jessica Barden. In the second week of 2020, Gray teased fans online by tweeting daily hints about the title of his debut album. On January 9, 2020, Gray revealed the title of his debut album, Kid Krow, and wrote, "I say more on this album than I've ever said in my life, and I can't wait to tell you all of my secrets." Gray released "The Story", the fourth single off of the album later that day to coincide with the announcement of the album's name and track list. The music video for "The Story" was released a few days later. Without notice, Gray released the album's fifth single, "Wish You Were Sober" as a surprise, two days before the album's release. The album was released on March 20, 2020, through Republic Records in the US, and Island Records in the UK. The online domain "kidkrow.com" was used as an interactive live countdown website with live social media feeds embedded vertically along the sides of the web interface. The music video for the song "Heather" was released on August 20, before the song impacted contemporary hit radio in the UK as the sixth single from the album.

== Commercial performance ==
Kid Krow debuted at number five on the US Billboard 200 with over 49,000 album-equivalent units, including 37,000 pure album sales. In the US, it was the biggest new artist debut of 2020 as of September 2020, and was the biggest pop solo debut album in over two years since Camila Cabello's 2018 self-titled album. Kid Krow also became of the biggest debut studio albums in the first half of 2020 in the United Kingdom, and the sixth biggest debut album of 2020 in Ireland. The album debuted at number 30 on the UK Albums Chart as well as number 5 in Canada, number 26 in Australia, number 20 in Ireland, number 11 in Scotland and Lithuania, number 32 in New Zealand, 49 in Belgium (Flanders), 21 in Estonia and 94 in the Netherlands.

== Track listing ==
All tracks are written by Conan Gray, except where noted. All tracks are produced by Dan Nigro, except where noted.

Kid Krow track listing
No.	Title	Writer(s)	Producer(s)	Length
1.	"Comfort Crowd"	Gray; Dan Nigro		2:54
2.	"Wish You Were Sober"	Gray; Nigro		2:48
3.	"Maniac"	Gray; Nigro		3:05
4.	"(Online Love)"		Gray	0:37
5.	"Checkmate"			2:28
6.	"The Cut That Always Bleeds"			3:51
7.	"Fight or Flight"			2:51
8.	"Affluenza"	Gray; Nigro		3:19
9.	"(Can We Be Friends?)"			0:57
10.	"Heather"		Nigro; Jam City	3:18
11.	"Little League"	Gray; Ben Berger; Ryan McMahon; Ryan Rabin	Captain Cuts	3:14
12.	"The Story"			4:05
Total length:				33:27

== Personnel ==
- Conan Gray – all vocals, writer (all tracks), additional/background vocals (tracks 1–3,5–7,10,12), producer (track 4), acoustic guitar (track 4,9)
- Daniel Nigro – producer (tracks 1,3,5,12), writer (track 3), bass (tracks 1,3–5,10), electric guitar (tracks 1–2,5,7–8,10,12), acoustic guitar (tracks 1,5–6,10,12), bass (tracks 1–3,8,12), drum programming (tracks 1–3,5–8,12), synthesizer (tracks 1–3,7–8,12), engineer (tracks 1–3,6–8,10,12), mixer (track 9)
- Ryan Linvil – drum programming (tracks 1,5), electric bass (tracks 5,7)
- Captain Cuts – producer (track 11), composer (track 11), guitar (track 11), drums (track 11), bass (track 11), lyricist (track 11)
- Mitch McCarthy – mixer (tracks 1,6–8,10,12)
- Chris Kasych – engineer (tracks 1,6–7)
- Jam City – assistant producer (track 10), guitar (track 10), engineer (track 10), drum programming (track 10)
- Sterling Laws – drums (tracks 1,6–7)
- Oscar Neidhardt – vocal engineer/editing (track 11)
- John Hanes – engineer (track 3)
- Serban Ghenea – mixer (tracks 2–3,11)
- Michael Freeman – additional mixer (track 5)
- Mark "Spike" Stent – mixer (track 5)
- Erick Sema – guitar (tracks 6–7)
- Kathleen – background vocals (track 12)
- Randy Merrill – mastering

== Charts ==
=== Weekly charts ===
Weekly chart performance
Chart (2020)	Peak position
Australian Albums (ARIA)	26
Austrian Albums (Ö3 Austria)	60
Belgian Albums (Ultratop Flanders)	49
Canadian Albums (Billboard)	5
Finnish Albums (Suomen virallinen lista)	27
Estonian Albums (Eesti Tipp-40)	21
Dutch Albums (Album Top 100)	27
Irish Albums (Official Charts)	20
Lithuanian Albums (AGATA)	11
New Zealand Albums (RMNZ)	32
Norwegian Albums (VG-lista)	33
Polish Albums (ZPAV)	28
Portuguese Albums (AFP)	38
Scottish Albums (Official Charts)	11
Spanish Albums (Promusicae)	39
Swedish Albums (Sverigetopplistan)	60
UK Albums (Official Charts)	30
US Billboard 200	5

2025 weekly chart performance
Chart (2025)	Peak position
Belgian Albums (Ultratop Wallonia)	137

=== Year-end charts ===
2020 year-end chart performance
Chart (2020)	Position
US Billboard 200	180

== Certifications ==
Certifications
Region	Certification	Certified units/sales
Canada (Music Canada)	2× Platinum	160,000^{‡}
Denmark (IFPI Danmark)	Gold	10,000^{‡}
Mexico (AMPROFON)	Platinum	60,000^{‡}
New Zealand (RMNZ)	Platinum	15,000^{‡}
Poland (ZPAV)	Platinum	20,000^{‡}
Singapore (RIAS)	Gold	5,000^{*}
United Kingdom (BPI)	Gold	100,000^{‡}
United States (RIAA)	Platinum	1,000,000^{‡}
^{*} Sales figures based on certification alone.^{‡} Sales+streaming figures based on certification alone.

== Release history ==
Release history
Region	Date	Format	Label	Ref.
Various	March 20, 2020	CD; digital download; streaming; vinyl; cassette	Republic	

== Kid Krow, Decomposed (5 Year Anniversary) ==
Kid Krow, Decomposed (5 Year Anniversary)

Studio album (reissue) by Conan Gray
- Released: March 19, 2025
- Recorded: 2019 ("Bed Rest")
- Length: 45:38
- Label: Republic

Conan Gray chronology
Found Heaven (2024)	Kid Krow, Decomposed (5 Year Anniversary) (2025)	Wishbone (2025)

Singles from Kid Krow, Decomposed (5 Year Anniversary)
- 1. "Bed Rest" Released: March 19, 2025

Kid Krow, Decomposed (5 Year Anniversary) is a reissue of Kid Krow, released on March 19, 2025 by Republic Records, to celebrate the fifth year anniversary of the original album's release.

The reissue was a surprise release, appearing on streaming services immediately following its announcement on Conan Gray's social media pages. It features a revised track listing, with several of the tracks moved to different places, as well as three bonus tracks. The first is "Bed Rest", a track that Gray described on his Instagram post by saying "not only does it perfectly encapsulate how I felt about life then, it somehow also speaks so perfectly to how I feel about life now, five years later (sometimes you have to go a little crazy before you can come back to your senses)." The second and third bonus tracks are live recordings of the songs "The Cut That Always Bleeds" and "Heather" from Found Heaven On Tour, a tour promoting Gray's third studio album.

The performance of "Heather" included is referred to as the "lost verse" version, where Gray sings an additional verse before the final chorus that is not found on the studio recording. It was previously released on a vinyl single in December 2024.

=== Track listing ===
All tracks are written by Conan Gray, except where noted. All tracks are produced by Dan Nigro, except where noted.

Kid Krow, Decomposed (5 Year Anniversary) track listing
No.	Title	Writer(s)	Producer(s)	Length
1.	"Bed Rest"			4:08
2.	"The Cut That Always Bleeds"			3:51
3.	"Wish You Were Sober"	Gray; Nigro		2:48
4.	"Heather"		Nigro; Jam City	3:18
5.	"(Online Love)"		Gray	0:37
6.	"Fight or Flight"			2:51
7.	"Maniac"	Gray; Nigro		3:05
8.	"Affluenza"	Gray; Nigro		3:19
9.	"Checkmate"			2:28
10.	"(Can We Be Friends?)"			0:57
11.	"Little League"	Gray; Ben Berger; Ryan McMahon; Ryan Rabin	Captain Cuts	3:14
12.	"Comfort Crowd"	Gray; Dan Nigro		2:54
13.	"The Story"			4:05
14.	"The Cut That Always Bleeds (live)"		Gray	3:58
15.	"Heather (Lost Verse Version) [live]"		Gray	3:59
Total length:				45:39

=== Certifications ===
Certifications for Kid Krow, Decomposed (5 Year Anniversary)
Region	Certification	Certified units/sales
Brazil (Pro-Música Brasil)	2× Platinum	80,000^{‡}
^{‡} Sales+streaming figures based on certification alone.

== See also ==
- List of 2020 albums
