= Comfort Crowd =

Single by Conan Gray

from the album Kid Krow
- Released: September 5, 2019
- Genre: Pop rock
- Length: 2:54
- Label: Republic Records
- Songwriters: Conan Gray, Dan Nigro
- Producer: Dan Nigro

Conan Gray singles chronology
"Checkmate" (2019)	"Comfort Crowd" (2019)	"Maniac" (2019)

Music video
- "Comfort Crowd" on YouTube

"Comfort Crowd" is a song by singer-songwriter Conan Gray. It was firstly released on July 26, 2019, and then fully released along with its music video on September 5, 2019 as the second single for Gray's debut album, Kid Krow.

== Background ==
Friendship has always had a special place in Conan's heart, he's talked many times that his friends are everything to him. "Comfort Crowd" digs more into that theme. It's a song about acknowledging the need of friends in bad situations, where they are extremely needed and helpful. While promoting the single, Gray shares the following message, "i was lonely as shit. all my friends were back home in texas and i had just moved to college so i didn’t have a single friend. i just remember wishing so badly that i could spend time with my best friend the way we used to. just sit on our phones and talk."

== Critical reception ==
PAPER magazine upvotes the song, saying the track has "dreamy melodies, nostalgic acoustic sound, and vulnerable lyrics." Similarly, Taila Lee from The Paw Print calls the track a "soothing odes to friendship", along with different past tracks of his, such as "The Other Side". Finally, Melodic Magazine names "Comfort Crowd" a "fan favorite." Along with the description that "the track shifts from dark and lonely to bright and warm." They finalize their review with " You understand how important his friends mean to him and how he will always rely on their support."

== Certifications ==
Region	Certification	Certified Units/Sales
United States (RIAA)	Gold	400,000^{‡}
