= Dan Nigro =

American record producer

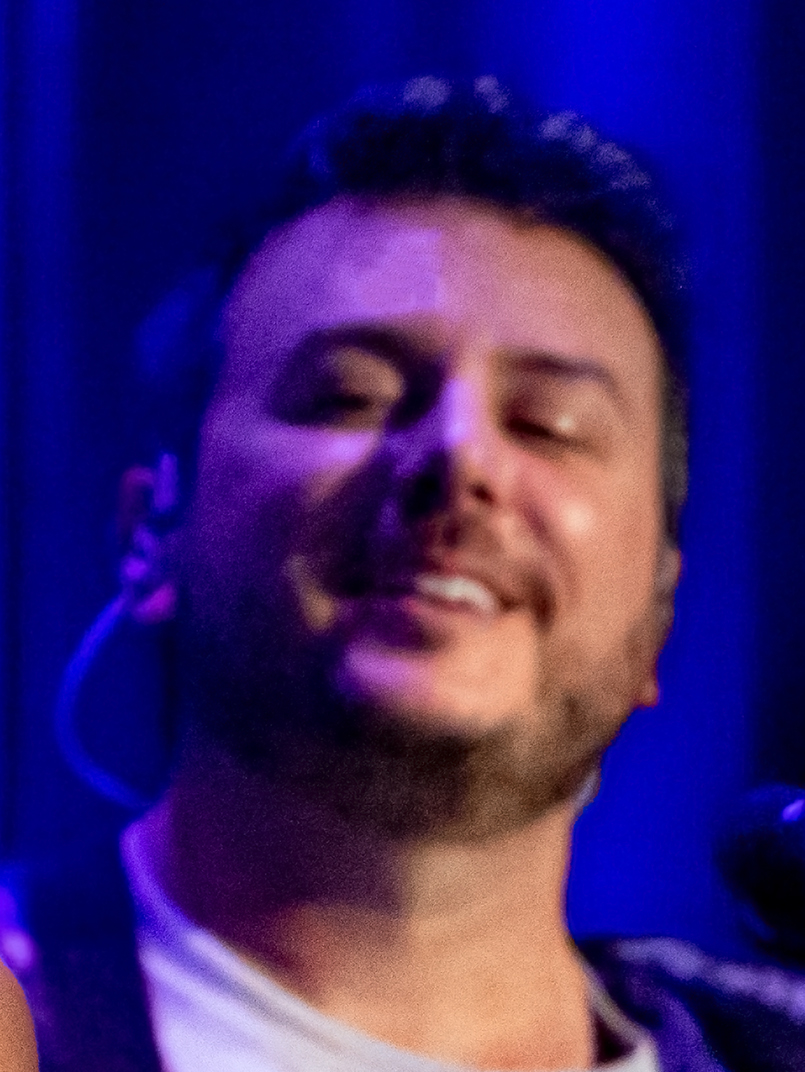
- Nigro in 2023

Background information
- Born: Daniel Leonard Nigro; May 14, 1982 (age 44); North Massapequa, New York, U.S.
- Genres: Indie rock; emo; alternative rock
- Occupations: Record producer; songwriter; musician
- Instruments: Vocals; guitar
- Years active: 2001–present
- Formerly of: As Tall as Lions
- Spouse: Emily Williams (m. 2020)
- Children: 2

Daniel Leonard Nigro (/ˈnaɪɡroʊ/ NY-groh; born May 14, 1982) is an American record producer and songwriter. He was previously the lead vocalist and guitarist of the indie rock band As Tall as Lions. Nigro has produced, written, and co-written songs for Sky Ferreira, Joe Jonas, Kylie Minogue, Caroline Polachek, Olivia Rodrigo, Chappell Roan, Dermot Kennedy, Reneé Rapp, Maisie Peters, Conan Gray, and Lorde.

Nigro has been nominated for 16 Grammy Awards, winning Best Pop Vocal Album for Rodrigo's Sour (2021) and Producer of the Year, Non-Classical in 2025. In 2024, he was named "Producer of the Year" by Variety Hitmakers and Songwriter of the Year at the ASCAP Pop Music Awards.

== Early life ==
Daniel Leonard Nigro was raised in Massapequa Park, New York, on Long Island, by parents Louis, a second-generation business owner and Claire, an artist specializing in oil painting. In his youth he took piano, guitar, and voice lessons. His sister, Alexa, co-founded the Scough fashion company and his brother, Leonard, is an international chef.

Nigro attended Catholic schools from kindergarten through high school. He once said that he "never felt the need to go to college", but went to Fordham University, although he would later drop out to pursue music.

== Career ==
=== As Tall as Lions ===
With Sean Fitzgerald, Cliff Sarcona and two other high school friends, Nigro formed the indie rock band Sundaze in 1998, releasing an album called "Seal of Approval", that included "King of the World", which became a local fan favorite. In 2001, he formed As Tall as Lions, with Fitzgerald, Sarcona and Brian Fortune. In 2002, they released their first EP, Blood and Aphorisms. In 2003, they signed a record deal with Island and Triple Crown Records and left college with the full support of their parents to pursue music full-time.

In 2004, the band released their debut album, Lafcadio, and began touring. In 2006, after some lineup changes, which now included Julio Tavarez as their bassist while Brian Caesar left the band, they released As Tall as Lions and began a headlining tour. In July 2007, they appeared on Jimmy Kimmel Live!. In 2009, You Can't Take It with You was released, peaking at number 88 on the Billboard 200 chart. By September 2010, the band split up. Upon the announcement of the news, their last shows sold out and more were added to the schedule. They immediately planned what would be billed as their reunion, which was performed in 2015 without new music to supplement it.

=== Songwriting ===
Nigro moved to Los Angeles to become a songwriter, collaborating with childhood friend Justin Raisen, and was able to do with support from his parents. He found initial success with a jingle for a McDonald's advertisement and then with Sky Ferreira. Nigro began as a songwriter then learned production to exercise full creative control.

=== Amusement Records ===
After Chappell Roan was dropped by her former record label, the pair continued writing, producing and releasing songs together. Nigro formed independent label Amusement Records in 2023. Though originally formed for Roan, Nigro said he intended to build out its roster. In 2025, Nigro and Amusement began an exclusivity partnership with Universal Music Group, later signing Devon Again as Amusement's second artist.

== Personal life ==
Nigro married visual artist Emily Williams in September 2020. Together they have two children. Their daughter Saoirse can be heard in the final seconds of Olivia Rodrigo's song "Teenage Dream", and is credited as a background vocalist on the song "Take Me Home (4 Christmas)".

== Discography ==
=== As Tall as Lions ===
Album	Release date	Label	Billboard 200 peak
Lafcadio	May 18, 2004	Triple Crown Records	–
As Tall as Lions	August 8, 2006	Triple Crown Records	–
You Can't Take It With You	August 18, 2009	Triple Crown Records	88

=== Songwriting and production credits ===
Key
‡	Indicates songs solely written or produced by Dan Nigro

Year	Artist	Song	Album	Written with	Produced with
2011	Kimbra	"Cameo Lover"	Vows	Kimbra	–
2012	Sky Ferreira	"Lost in My Bedroom"	Ghost	Sky Ferreira, Ariel Rechtshaid, Justin Raisen	–
2013	Sky Ferreira	"You're Not the One"	Night Time, My Time	Sky Ferreira, Ariel Rechtshaid, Justin Raisen	–
2013	Sky Ferreira	"I Blame Myself"	Night Time, My Time	Sky Ferreira, Ariel Rechtshaid, Justin Raisen, Jordan Benik	–
2013	Sky Ferreira	"I Will"	Night Time, My Time	Sky Ferreira, Ariel Rechtshaid, Justin Raisen	–
2013	Sky Ferreira	"Love in Stereo"	Night Time, My Time	Sky Ferreira, Ariel Rechtshaid, Justin Raisen, Jeremiah Raisen	–
2014	Kylie Minogue	"If Only"	Kiss Me Once	Ariel Rechtshaid, Justin Raisen	–
2014	Kylie Minogue	"Golden Boy"	Kiss Me Once	Ariel Rechtshaid, Justin Raisen	–
2014	Billy Idol	"Can't Break Me Down"	Kings & Queens of the Underground	Billy Idol, Greg Kurstin	–
2014	Dillon Francis	"Hurricane" (featuring Lily Elise)	Money Sucks, Friends Rule	Dillon Hart Francis, Leah Hayes, Oliver Goldstein	Dillon Francis, Oligee
2015	Twin Shadow	"When the Lights Turn Out"	Eclipse	George Lewis, Wynne Bennett	–
2015	Little Boots	"Help Too"	Working Girl	Little Boots	Solee
2015	Carly Rae Jepsen	"When I Needed You"	Emotion	Carly Rae Jepsen, Ariel Rechtshaid, Nate Campany, Tavish Crowe	Ariel Rechtshaid
2015	JR JR	"Gone"	JR JR	Joshua Epstein, Mike Higgins, Daniel Zott	–
2016	A-Trak	"Parallel Lines" (featuring Phantogram)	Non-album single	A-Trak, Joshua Carter, Sarah Barthel, Dave 1, Cory Enemy, Mereki	–
2016	Zella Day	"Man on the Moon"	Man on the Moon / Hunnie Pie	Zella Day Kerr	Sole production ‡
2016	Zella Day	"Hunnie Pie"	Man on the Moon / Hunnie Pie	Zella Day Kerr	Sole production ‡
2016	Andrew McMahon in the Wilderness	"Walking in My Sleep"	Zombies on Broadway	Andrew McMahon in the Wilderness, Morgan Kibby	–
2017	Lo Moon	"This Is It"	Lo Moon	Matt Lowell	–
2017	Lo Moon	"Thorns"	Lo Moon	Matt Lowell	–
2017	Lewis Capaldi	"Mercy"	Bloom	Lewis Capaldi	Sole production ‡
2018	Rae Morris	"Physical Form"	Someone Out There	Rae Morris	–
2018	Finneas	"Heaven"	Non-album single	Finneas O'Connell	Finneas O'Connell
2018	Lo Moon	"Tried to Make You My Own"	Lo Moon	Matt Lowell, Christian Baker	–
2018	Lo Moon	"My Money"	Lo Moon	Matt Lowell	–
2018	Lo Moon	"Real Love"	Lo Moon	Matt Lowell	–
2018	Lo Moon	"The Right Thing"	Lo Moon	Matt Lowell, Samuel Stewart	–
2018	Empress Of	"When I'm with Him"	Us	Jim-E Stack, Empress Of	Jim-E Stack, Empress Of
2018	Conan Gray	"Generation Why"	Sunset Season	–	Sole production ‡
2018	Conan Gray	"Crush Culture"	Sunset Season	–	Conan Gray
2018	Conan Gray	"Greek God"	Sunset Season	–	Sole production ‡
2018	Conan Gray	"Lookalike"	Sunset Season	–	Sole production ‡
2018	Lo Moon	"For Me, It's You"	Non-album single	Matt Lowell	Matt Lowell
2019	Grace VanderWaal	"The City"	Letters Vol. 1	Grace VanderWaal	Ido Zmishlany
2019	Riverdale cast	"These Are the Moments I Remember"	Riverdale: Season 1 (Original Television Soundtrack)	Christopher Gabriel	–
2019	Conan Gray	"The King"	Non-album single	Conan Gray	Solee
2019	Hey Violet	"Better by Myself"	To All the Boys: P.S. I Still Love You (Music from the Netflix Film)	Casey Moreta, Gabe Simon, Rena Lovelis, Nia Lovelis	Solee
2019	Freya Ridings	"Castles"	Freya Ridings	Freya Ridings	Mark Crew, Dan Priddy, Yves Rothman
2019	Caroline Polachek	"I Give Up"	Pang	Caroline Polachek, James Stack	Caroline Polachek, Jim-E Stack, Dan Carey
2019	Caroline Polachek	"Look at Me Now"	Pang	Caroline Polachek, Daniel Eisner Harle	Caroline Polachek, Danny L Harle
2019	Caroline Polachek	"So Hot You're Hurting My Feelings"	Pang	Caroline Polachek, Teddy Geiger	Caroline Polachek
2019	Caroline Polachek	"Door"	Pang	Caroline Polachek, James Stack, Daniel Eisner Harle	Caroline Polachek, Jim-E Stack, Daniel Eisner Harle (co.)
2019	Conan Gray	"Checkmate"	Kid Krow	–	Sole production ‡
2019	Conan Gray	"Comfort Crowd"	Kid Krow	Conan Gray	Sole production ‡
2019	Conan Gray	"Maniac"	Kid Krow	Conan Gray	Sole production ‡
2020	Conan Gray	"Wish You Were Sober"	Kid Krow	Conan Gray	Sole production ‡
2020	Conan Gray	"The Cut That Always Bleeds"	Kid Krow	–	Sole production ‡
2020	Conan Gray	"Fight or Flight"	Kid Krow	–	Sole production ‡
2020	Conan Gray	"Affluenza"	Kid Krow	Conan Gray	Sole production ‡
2020	Conan Gray	"(Can We Be Friends?)"	Kid Krow	–	Sole production ‡
2020	Conan Gray	"Heather"	Kid Krow	–	Jam City
2020	Conan Gray	"The Story"	Kid Krow	–	Sole production ‡
2020	Lyn Lapid	"Producer Man"	Non-album single	Lyn Lapid	Sole production ‡
2020	Chappell Roan	"California"	The Rise and Fall of a Midwest Princess	Kayleigh Rose Amstutz	Sole production ‡
2020	Chappell Roan	"Love Me Anyway"	Non-album single	Kayleigh Rose Amstutz	Sole production ‡
2020	Chappell Roan	"Pink Pony Club"	The Rise and Fall of a Midwest Princess	Kayleigh Rose Amstutz	Sole production ‡
2021	Half Alive	"Time 2"	Non-album single	Josh Taylor, J. Tyler Johnson, Brett Kramer & Ariel Rechtshaid	–
2021	Cautious Clay	"Roots"	Deadpan Love	–	Johan Lenox, Jim-E Stack, Cautious Clay
2021	Rosie	"100 Headaches"	Non-album single	Rosaileen Scher	–
2021	Olivia Rodrigo	"Brutal"	Sour	Olivia Rodrigo	Sole production ‡
2021	Olivia Rodrigo	"Traitor"	Sour	Olivia Rodrigo	Sole production ‡
2021	Olivia Rodrigo	"Drivers License"	Sour	Olivia Rodrigo	Sole production ‡
2021	Olivia Rodrigo	"1 Step Forward, 3 Steps Back"	Sour	Olivia Rodrigo, Taylor Swift, Jack Antonoff	Sole production ‡ Olivia Rodrigo (co.)
2021	Olivia Rodrigo	"Deja Vu"	Sour	Olivia Rodrigo, Taylor Swift, Jack Antonoff, St. Vincent	
2021	Olivia Rodrigo	"Good 4 U"	Sour	Olivia Rodrigo	Alexander 23 (co.)
2021	Olivia Rodrigo	"Enough for You"	Sour	–	Olivia Rodrigo (co.)
2021	Olivia Rodrigo	"Happier"	Sour	–	Sole production ‡
2021	Olivia Rodrigo	"Jealousy, Jealousy"	Sour	Olivia Rodrigo, Casey Smith	Jam City (co.)
2021	Olivia Rodrigo	"Favorite Crime"	Sour	Olivia Rodrigo	Sole production ‡
2021	Olivia Rodrigo	"Hope Ur Ok"	Sour	Olivia Rodrigo	Sole production ‡
2021	Conan Gray	"People Watching"	Superache	Conan Gray, Julia Michaels	Sole production ‡
2021	Conan Gray	"Astronomy"	Superache	Conan Gray	Sole production ‡
2022	Conan Gray	"Movies"	Superache	Conan Gray	Sole production ‡
2022	Conan Gray	"Best Friend"	Superache	Conan Gray	Sole production ‡
2022	Conan Gray	"Yours"	Superache	Conan Gray	Sole production ‡
2022	Conan Gray	"Jigsaw"	Superache	Conan Gray	Sole production ‡
2022	Conan Gray	"Family Line"	Superache	Conan Gray	Sole production ‡
2022	Conan Gray	"Footnote"	Superache	Conan Gray	Sole production ‡
2022	Conan Gray	"Memories"	Superache	Conan Gray	Sole production ‡
2022	Conan Gray	"The Exit"	Superache	Conan Gray, Julia Michaels	Ryan Linvill
2022	Hatchie	"Quicksand"	Giving the World Away	Harriette Pilbeam, Joe Agius	Sole production ‡
2022	Maisie Peters	"Good Enough"	Non-album single	Maisie Peters	Sole production ‡
2022	Chappell Roan	"Naked in Manhattan"	The Rise and Fall of a Midwest Princess	Kayleigh Rose Amstutz, Skyler Stonestreet	Sole production ‡
2022	Chappell Roan	"My Kink Is Karma"	The Rise and Fall of a Midwest Princess	Kayleigh Rose Amstutz, Justin Tranter	Sole production ‡
2022	Chappell Roan	"Femininomenon"	The Rise and Fall of a Midwest Princess	Kayleigh Rose Amstutz	Mike Wise
2022	Chappell Roan	"Casual"	The Rise and Fall of a Midwest Princess	Kayleigh Rose Amstutz, Morgan St. Jean	Ryan Linvill
2023	Chappell Roan	"Kaleidoscope"	The Rise and Fall of a Midwest Princess	Kayleigh Rose Amstutz	Sole production ‡
2023	Chappell Roan	"Picture You"	The Rise and Fall of a Midwest Princess	Kayleigh Rose Amstutz	Sole production ‡
2023	Chappell Roan	"Red Wine Supernova"	The Rise and Fall of a Midwest Princess	Kayleigh Rose Amstutz, Lisa hickox, Amy Kuney, Annie Schindel	Noah Condrad, Lixa
2023	Chappell Roan	"Hot to Go!"	The Rise and Fall of a Midwest Princess	Kayleigh Rose Amstutz	Sole production ‡
2023	Chappell Roan	"After Midnight"	The Rise and Fall of a Midwest Princess	Kayleigh Rose Amstutz, Casey Smith	Sole production ‡
2023	Chappell Roan	"Coffee"	The Rise and Fall of a Midwest Princess	Kayleigh Rose Amstutz, Maya Kurchner, Eric Leva	Sole production ‡
2023	Chappell Roan	"Super Graphic Ultra Modern Girl"	The Rise and Fall of a Midwest Princess	Kayleigh Rose Amstutz, Annika Bennett, Jonah Shy	Mike Wise, Jonah Shy
2023	Chappell Roan	"Guilty Pleasure"	The Rise and Fall of a Midwest Princess	Kayleigh Rose Amstutz, Marcus Andersson, Nate Campany	Sole production ‡
2023	Caroline Polachek	"Welcome To My Island"	Desire, I Want to Turn Into You	Caroline Polachek, James Stack	Caroline Polachek, Danny L Harle, Jim-E Stack, A. G. Cook (add.)
2023	Olivia Rodrigo	"Vampire"	Guts	Olivia Rodrigo	Sole production ‡
2023	Olivia Rodrigo	"Bad Idea Right?"	Guts	Olivia Rodrigo	Sole production ‡
2023	Olivia Rodrigo	"All-American Bitch"	Guts	Olivia Rodrigo	Sole production ‡
2023	Olivia Rodrigo	"Lacy"	Guts	Olivia Rodrigo	Sole production ‡
2023	Olivia Rodrigo	"Ballad of a Homeschooled Girl"	Guts	Olivia Rodrigo	Sole production ‡
2023	Olivia Rodrigo	"Logical"	Guts	Olivia Rodrigo, Julia Michaels	Ryan Linvill
2023	Olivia Rodrigo	"Get Him Back!"	Guts	Olivia Rodrigo	Alexander 23, Ian Kirkpatrick
2023	Olivia Rodrigo	"Love is Embarrassing"	Guts	Olivia Rodrigo	Sole production ‡
2023	Olivia Rodrigo	"The Grudge"	Guts	Olivia Rodrigo	Ryan Linvill
2023	Olivia Rodrigo	"Pretty Isn't Pretty"	Guts	Olivia Rodrigo, Amy Allen	Sole production ‡
2023	Olivia Rodrigo	"Teenage Dream"	Guts	Olivia Rodrigo	Sole production ‡
2023	Olivia Rodrigo	"Can't Catch Me Now"	The Hunger Games: The Ballad of Songbirds & Snakes (Music From & Inspired By)	Olivia Rodrigo	Sole production ‡
2024	Olivia Rodrigo	"Obsessed"	Guts (Spilled)	Olivia Rodrigo, St. Vincent	Sole production ‡
2024	Olivia Rodrigo	"Girl I've Always Been"	Guts (Spilled)	–	Sole production ‡
2024	Olivia Rodrigo	"Scared of My Guitar"	Guts (Spilled)	Olivia Rodrigo, Amy Allen	Sole production ‡
2024	Olivia Rodrigo	"Stranger"	Guts (Spilled)	–	Sole production ‡
2024	Olivia Rodrigo	"So American"	Guts (Spilled)	Olivia Rodrigo	Sole production ‡
2024	Conan Gray	"Holidays"	Non-album singles	Conan Gray	Ethan Gruska, Conan Gray
2024	Chappell Roan	"Good Luck, Babe!"	Non-album singles	Kayleigh Rose Amstutz, Justin Tranter	Sole production ‡
2025	Chappell Roan	"The Giver"	Non-album singles	Kayleigh Rose Amstutz, Paul Cartwright	Sole production ‡
2025	Chappell Roan	"The Subway"	Non-album singles	Kayleigh Rose Amstutz	Sole production ‡
2025	Conan Gray	"Vodka Cranberry"	Wishbone	Conan Gray	Sole production ‡
2025	Conan Gray	"Actor"	Wishbone	Conan Gray	Sole production ‡
2025	Conan Gray	"Caramel"	Wishbone	Conan Gray	Jon Buscema
2025	Lorde	"What Was That"	Virgin	–	Lorde, Jim-E Stack
2025	Lorde	"Broken Glass"	Virgin	Lorde, James Stack	Lorde, Jim-E Stack
2025	Reneé Rapp	"That’s So Funny"	Bite Me	Reneé Rapp, Alexander Glantz, Luka Kloser, Ali Tamposi	–
2026	Olivia Rodrigo	"Drop Dead"	You Seem Pretty Sad for a Girl So in Love	Olivia Rodrigo, Amy Allen	Sole production ‡
2026	Olivia Rodrigo	"Stupid Song"	You Seem Pretty Sad for a Girl So in Love	Olivia Rodrigo	Sole production ‡
2026	Olivia Rodrigo	"Honeybee"	You Seem Pretty Sad for a Girl So in Love	–	Sole production ‡
2026	Olivia Rodrigo	"Maggots for Brains"	You Seem Pretty Sad for a Girl So in Love	Olivia Rodrigo, Amy Allen	Sole production ‡
2026	Olivia Rodrigo	"U + Me = <3"	You Seem Pretty Sad for a Girl So in Love	Olivia Rodrigo	Sole production ‡
2026	Olivia Rodrigo	"My Way"	You Seem Pretty Sad for a Girl So in Love	Olivia Rodrigo, Steph Jones	Sole production ‡
2026	Olivia Rodrigo	"Purple"	You Seem Pretty Sad for a Girl So in Love	Olivia Rodrigo, Amy Allen	Sole production ‡
2026	Olivia Rodrigo	"The Cure"	You Seem Pretty Sad for a Girl So in Love	Olivia Rodrigo	Sole production ‡
2026	Olivia Rodrigo	"Begged"	You Seem Pretty Sad for a Girl So in Love	–	Sole production ‡
2026	Olivia Rodrigo	"What's Wrong with Me"	You Seem Pretty Sad for a Girl So in Love	Olivia Rodrigo, Sasha Alex Sloan	Sole production ‡
2026	Olivia Rodrigo	"Less"	You Seem Pretty Sad for a Girl So in Love	Olivia Rodrigo, Amy Allen	Sole production ‡
2026	Olivia Rodrigo	"Expectations"	You Seem Pretty Sad for a Girl So in Love	Olivia Rodrigo, Amy Allen	Sole production ‡
2026	Olivia Rodrigo	"Cigarette Smoke"	You Seem Pretty Sad for a Girl So in Love	Olivia Rodrigo	Sole production ‡
2026	Olivia Rodrigo	"Take Me Home (4 Christmas)"	Non-Album Single	Olivia Rodrigo, Dan Nigro, Amy Allen	Sole production ‡
2026	Gracie Abrams	"Look at My Life"	Daughter from Hell	—N/a	Gracie Abrams, Aaron Dessner

== Awards and nominations ==
Award	Year (Note: Indicates the year of ceremony. Each year is linked to the article about the awards held that year, wherever possible.)	Recipient(s) and nominee(s)	Category	Result	Ref.
ASCAP Pop Music Awards	2022	"Drivers License" (with Rodrigo)	Winning Songwriters and Publishers	Won	
ASCAP Pop Music Awards	2022	"Good 4 U" (with Rodrigo, Williams and Farro)	Winning Songwriters and Publishers	Won	
ASCAP Pop Music Awards	2022	"Deja Vu" (with Rodrigo, Clark)	Winning Songwriters and Publishers	Won	
ASCAP Pop Music Awards	2024	"Vampire (with Rodrigo)	Songwriter of the Year	Won	
ASCAP Pop Music Awards	2024	"Bad Idea Right?" (with Rodrigo)	Songwriter of the Year	Won	
Billboard Music Awards	2024	Himself	Top Hot 100 Producer	Nominated	
Gold Derby Film Awards	2024	"Can't Catch Me Now" (with Rodrigo)	Best Original Song	Nominated	
Gold List	2024	"Can't Catch Me Now" (with Rodrigo)	Best Original Song	Won	
Guild of Music Supervisors Awards	2024	"Can't Catch Me Now" (with Rodrigo)	Best Song Written and/or Recording Created for a Film	Nominated	
Grammy Awards	2022	Sour	Best Pop Vocal Album (Producer and Engineer)	Won	
Grammy Awards	2022	Sour	Album of the Year	Nominated	
Grammy Awards	2022	"Drivers License"	Record of the Year	Nominated	
Grammy Awards	2022	"Drivers License"	Song of the Year	Nominated	
Grammy Awards	2024	Guts	Best Pop Vocal Album (Producer and Engineer)	Nominated	
Grammy Awards	2024	Guts	Album of the Year	Nominated	
Grammy Awards	2024	"Vampire"	Record of the Year	Nominated	
Grammy Awards	2024	"Vampire"	Song of the Year	Nominated	
Grammy Awards	2024	"Ballad of a Homeschooled Girl"	Best Rock Song	Nominated	
Grammy Awards	2024	Himself	Producer of the Year, Non-Classical	Nominated	
Grammy Awards	2025	The Rise and Fall of a Midwest Princess	Best Pop Vocal Album (Producer and Engineer)	Nominated	
Grammy Awards	2025	The Rise and Fall of a Midwest Princess	Album of the Year	Nominated	
Grammy Awards	2025	"Good Luck, Babe!"	Record of the Year	Nominated	
Grammy Awards	2025	"Good Luck, Babe!"	Song of the Year	Nominated	
Grammy Awards	2025	"Can't Catch Me Now"	Best Song Written for Visual Media	Nominated	
Grammy Awards	2025	Himself	Producer of the Year, Non-Classical	Won	
Grammy Awards	2026	"The Subway"	Record of the Year	Nominated	
Hollywood Music in Media Awards	2023	"Can't Catch Me Now"	Best Original Song in a Sci-Fi, Fantasy or Horror Film	Won	
North Carolina Film Critics Association	2023	"Can't Catch Me Now"	Outstanding Original Song for a Dramatic or Documentary Visual Media Production	Nominated	
Society of Composers and Lyricists Awards	2024	"Can't Catch Me Now"	Outstanding Original Song for a Dramatic or Documentary Visual Media Production	Won	
Variety Hitmakers	2024	Himself	Producer of the Year	Won	
