= Vampire (Olivia Rodrigo song) =

Single by Olivia Rodrigo

from the album Guts
- B-side: "Vampire" (first demo)
- Written: December 2022 – January 2023
- Released: June 30, 2023
- Studio: Amusement (Los Angeles)
- Genre: Pop; pop rock
- Length: 3:39
- Label: Geffen; Interscope
- Songwriters: Olivia Rodrigo; Dan Nigro
- Producer: Dan Nigro

Olivia Rodrigo singles chronology
"Brutal" (2021)	"Vampire" (2023)	"Bad Idea Right?" (2023)

Music video
- "Vampire" on YouTube

"Vampire" (stylized in all lowercase) is a song by American singer-songwriter Olivia Rodrigo. Geffen and Interscope Records released it on June 30, 2023, as the lead single from her second studio album, Guts (2023). Rodrigo co-wrote the song with her producer Dan Nigro. A pop and pop rock tune with elements of disco-rock, EDM, gothic rock, and symphonic rock, "Vampire" is driven by piano and rock instrumentation consisting of electric guitars, synthesizers, and programmed drums. An accompanying music video for the song directed by Petra Collins was released simultaneously.

"Vampire" topped the charts in Australia, Canada, Ireland, Israel, Japan, New Zealand, the United Kingdom, and the United States, becoming Rodrigo's third chart-topping single in all eight countries. The song also reached the top 10 in Austria, Germany, Greece, Iceland, Latvia, Luxembourg, Malaysia, the Netherlands, Norway, the Philippines, Singapore and Vietnam. It received the nominations for Record of the Year, Song of the Year and Best Pop Solo Performance at the 66th Annual Grammy Awards. Its music video won an MTV Video Music Award for Best Editing during the 2023 ceremony.

== Background and release ==
Rodrigo stated that her second studio album, Guts, would probably "be a lot happier" than her debut, Sour. On June 13, 2023, she announced "Vampire" as the lead single from the album. Limited edition 7-inch and CD singles featuring a demo version of the song were made available for pre-order, along with its pre-save on streaming platforms. "Vampire" was co-written by her and Nigro. Rodrigo told Billboard that she considered the song as her and Nigro's "version of a rock opera". She revealed it was selected as the lead single because it "felt like an evolution — in a good way that wasn't too stark", besides honoring her "singer-songwriter roots". She further described its creation: "I was upset about a certain situation and went to the studio alone and sat down at the grand piano, and the chords and melody and lyrics just poured out of me — almost like an out-of-body experience." Rodrigo initially intended it to be a piano ballad, though "when Dan and I started working on it, we juxtaposed the lyrics with these big drums and crazy tempo changes. So now it's like a heartbreak song you can dance to." The song was first written by Rodrigo in December 2022 and finished and recorded the following month.

The black-and-white cover art depicts Rodrigo with "a dark lip and purple criss-cross Band-Aids on her neck", based on which Nylon's Steffanee Wang wrote that "it might lean in the gothic, shadow-y pop arena". Some critics thought the Band-Aids indicated the spot where someone would be bitten by a vampire. The artwork also references the poster of the 1968 horror film Dracula Has Risen from the Grave. A 15-second snippet of the song was played when fans called Rodrigo's "Sour Heartbreak Hotline". Rodrigo teamed up with YouTube Shorts to launch "#vampireOR2" on June 30, 2023, an Internet challenge exclusively on the platform.

== Lyrics and composition ==
"Vampire"
A 19-second sample from the chorus of the clean version of "Vampire" by Olivia Rodrigo.

"Vampire" is three minutes and thirty-nine seconds long. Nigro produced the song and provided drum programming. He plays guitar, percussion, piano, bass, and synthesizer, Benjamin Romans plays piano, Paul Cartwright plays viola and violin, Sam Stewart plays electric guitar, and Sterling Laws plays drums. It was recorded at Amusement Studios in Los Angeles, and Serban Ghenea mixed it.

"Vampire" has been described as a "go-for-the-gusto pop statement" and a "melodramatic rock anthem", taking on the style of pop rock, with influences of gothic rock, a symphonic rock climax, and an EDM ending. It starts as a rock piano ballad, similarly to "Drivers License" according to Billboard's Jason Lipshutz, and eventually transforms into a dance and disco-rock song with "jittery percussion and wounded, dramatic vocal runs". The song was subject of a lot of criticism for the similarities to the Radiohead song "Creep", a song that she famously covered at the age of 13.

In the song, Rodrigo uses critical language towards an unidentified person, including "bloodsucker, fame fucker, bleedin' me dry like a goddamn vampire." "Fame fucker" is replaced in the clean version of the song with "dream crusher", and "goddamn" is shortened to "damn". Rodrigo makes several references to vampires, and at one point, sings "I should've known it was strange you only come out at night". She recalls how a several-years-older man she dated exploited her: "Went for me and not her / 'Cause girls your age know better". Listeners speculated on the song's subject, with many believing it to be about either film producer Adam Faze or DJ Zack Bia, both of whom Rodrigo "reportedly dated for about six months". In an interview with GQ, Bia said that he did not believe the lyrics referred to him as "[t]here was never any drama" after their relationship ended. Others believed the song was about Taylor Swift, which Rodrigo told The Guardian she "was very surprised" by.

Rodrigo stated there was "a lot of vampire lore to be played with" and she found "fun songwriting fodder" in it. She also revealed her and Nigro's vision for the song was how it "crescendoed the entire time and reflects the pent-up anger that you have for a situation".

== Critical reception ==
The Guardian's Laura Snapes gave the song a five-star rating and stated the pre-chorus "has a dreamy lightheadedness to it that's quickly become a Rodrigo trademark". Snapes also mentioned it "bears Rodrigo's wounds in a reminder of what's at stake for young women." Pitchfork named the song as the "Best New Track", and Quinn Moreland stated that it proved the "undeniable songwriting chemistry" between Rodrigo and Nigro: "There's an unhurried emotional logic to the track's structure, mirroring a young woman's gradual understanding of her own agency." Moreland highlighted the chorus of "Vampire" as "especially showstopping, even as it indulges in some on-the-nose imagery". Abby Jones and Jo Vito of Consequence thought the song "blossoms into a vehicle for Rodrigo's candid, emotional performance", and "the arrangement opens up to a high-energy backbeat, akin to the more upbeat tracks from Sour" after the second verse. Justin Curto of Vulture called the track a "full performance" that featured "each line sounding more emotionally exhausted than the last". He wrote that Rodrigo's lyrics "keep the charming specificity of her Sour tracks while packing more of a clever punch".

Critics' rankings of "Vampire"
Publication	List	Rank	Ref.
BBC	The Best Songs of 2023	5	
Billboard	The 100 Best Songs of 2023: Staff Picks	30	
Entertainment Weekly	The 10 best songs of 2023	3	
The Guardian	20 Best Songs of 2023	7	
The New York Times	Lindsay Zoladz's Best Songs of 2023	1	
NME	The 50 Best Songs of 2023	4	
Pitchfork	The 100 Best Songs of 2023	52	
Vulture	The Best Songs of 2023	1	

== Commercial performance ==
"Vampire" entered the US Billboard Hot 100 at number one, with 35.5 million streams, 26,000 sales (17,000 physical units; 9,000 digital downloads), and 26.3 million radio airplay audience impressions in its first week, ending July 6. It also debuted atop the Streaming Songs chart. Bolstered by the release of its parent album, the single returned to number one, peaking at the top for a second week. It tied for the longest gap between weeks at number one in a single chart run (9 weeks), matching the gap of Miley Cyrus' 2013 single "Wrecking Ball".

The song also debuted atop the Canadian Hot 100, becoming her third number-one in Canada. The song reached number one on the UK Singles Chart and has received 2× Platinum certification from the British Phonographic Industry (BPI), which denotes track-equivalent sales of 1,200,000 units. In Australia, "Vampire" debuted at the top of the ARIA Singles Chart and has been certified 5× Platinum by the Australian Recording Industry Association (ARIA). In Spain, following the release of the album, "Vampire" reentered the Top 100 at number 53, becoming its best-performing week in the country.

== Music video ==
On June 27, 2023, YouTube Shorts shared a teaser in which Rodrigo can be viewed resting on a patch of grass before being deluged by a blue-green haze while "a pounding electric guitar-filled snippet of 'Vampire' plays", which Billboard thought was likely from its music video. A later teaser shows her lying under a full moon while a piano-driven instrumental plays. Petra Collins—with whom Rodrigo had previously worked on the visuals for her 2021 singles "Good 4 U" and "Brutal"—directed the video, which was released at 12 a.m. ET on June 30. Hours prior to its release, the artist premiered the video at an exclusive YouTube Space event in Playa Vista, Los Angeles.

Filmed in Los Angeles, the music video for "Vampire" contains references to vampires "without being too on the nose". In the video, Rodrigo performs the song in an ethereal flower field. Once it is revealed that she is actually performing on stage at an awards show, she is hit by a falling light. As the pounding beat picks up speed, Rodrigo, who has a severe gash on her shoulder, keeps performing while spilling blood on her face and white outfit. When security guards surround her and attempt to escort her off the stage, she runs off and begins to feel ambushed as she runs out of the theater. Security continues to chase her into the city, which eventually culminates in her levitating into the night sky.

== Live performances ==
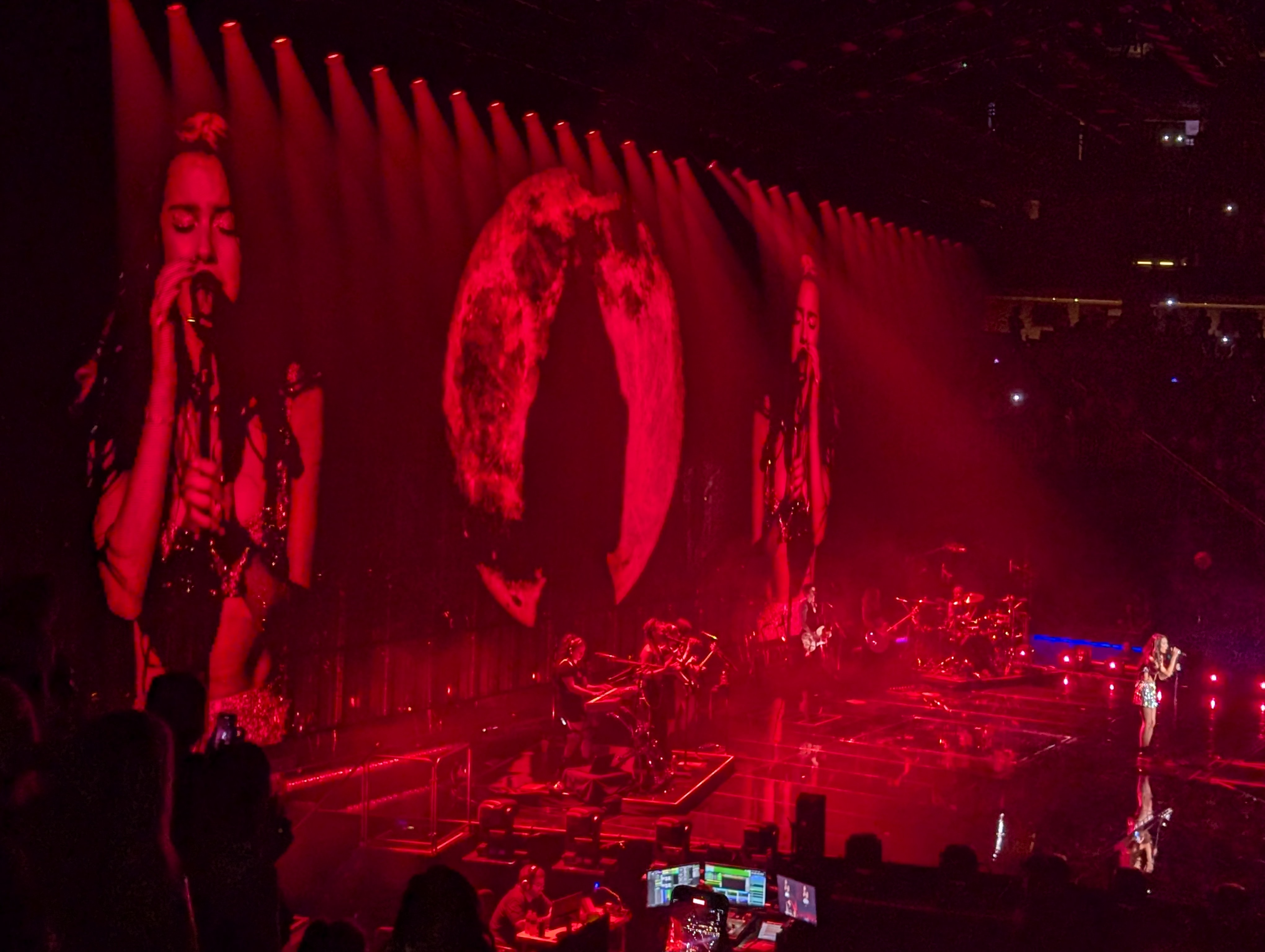
Rodrigo singing "Vampire" at the State Farm Arena in Atlanta on July 23, 2024.

Rodrigo's first live performance of "Vampire", on the piano, was published to her YouTube channel on July 6, 2023. On September 8, she gave the first televised performance of the song along with "Get Him Back!" on Today. She again performed "Vampire" along with the latter at the 2023 MTV Video Music Awards on September 12, DayDay on September 26, and Live Lounge on October 2. On October 9, Rodrigo performed an acoustic rendition of the song at her one-off concert, An Evening With Olivia Rodrigo, in Los Angeles. The song was part of her set on the December 2023 Los Angeles and New York City dates of iHeartRadio's Jingle Ball Tour 2023.

In February 2024, she performed the song live again at the 66th Annual Grammy Awards. "Vampire" was included in Rodrigo's setlist on the Guts World Tour (2024).

== Accolades ==
Awards and nominations
Organization	Year	Category	Result	Ref.
MTV Video Music Awards	2023	Video of the Year	Nominated	
MTV Video Music Awards	2023	Song of the Year	Nominated	
MTV Video Music Awards	2023	Best Pop	Nominated	
MTV Video Music Awards	2023	Best Editing	Won	
MTV Video Music Awards	2023	Best Cinematography	Nominated	
MTV Video Music Awards	2023	Song of Summer	Nominated	
MTV Europe Music Awards	2023	Best Song	Nominated	
MTV Europe Music Awards	2023	Best Video	Nominated	
NRJ Music Awards	2023	International Video of the Year	Nominated	
MTV Video Music Awards Japan	2023	Best Solo Artist Video: International	Won	
Musa Awards	2023	International Anglo Song of the Year	Nominated	
Grammy Awards	2024	Record of the Year	Nominated	
Grammy Awards	2024	Song of the Year	Nominated	
Grammy Awards	2024	Best Pop Solo Performance	Nominated	
People's Choice Awards	2024	The Song of the Year	Won	
Brit Awards	2024	Best International Song	Nominated	
Global Awards	2024	Most Played Song 2023	Nominated	
iHeartRadio Music Awards	2024	Song of the Year	Nominated	
iHeartRadio Music Awards	2024	Pop Song of the Year	Nominated	
iHeartRadio Music Awards	2024	Best Music Video	Nominated	
iHeartRadio Music Awards	2024	Best Lyrics	Nominated	
Webby Awards	2024	Music Video (Webby Winner)	Won	
Webby Awards	2024	Music Video (People's Voice Winner)	Won	
Webby Awards	2024	Best Individual Performance (People's Voice Winner)	Won	

== Credits and personnel ==
- Olivia Rodrigo – vocals, songwriting
- Dan Nigro – production, songwriting, vocal production, guitar, percussion, piano, bass guitar, synthesizer, drum programming, background vocals
- Benjamin Romans – piano
- Paul Cartwright – viola, violin
- Sam Stewart – electric guitar
- Sterling Laws – drums
- Serban Ghenea – mixing
- Bryce Bordone – mixing assistance

== Charts ==
=== Weekly charts ===
Weekly chart performance
Chart (2023–2024)	Peak position
Australia (ARIA)	1
Austria (Ö3 Austria Top 40)	8
Belgium (Ultratop 50 Flanders)	26
Belgium (Ultratop 50 Wallonia)	3
Canada Hot 100 (Billboard)	1
Canada Hot AC (Billboard)	5
Canada CHR/Top 40 (Billboard)	2
Croatia International Airplay (Top lista)	7
Czech Republic Airplay (ČNS IFPI)	4
Czech Republic Singles Digital (ČNS IFPI)	23
Denmark (Tracklisten)	28
Finland (Suomen virallinen lista)	37
France (SNEP)	45
Germany (GfK)	10
Global 200 (Billboard)	1
Greece International (IFPI)	3
Hong Kong (Billboard)	15
Hungary (Single Top 40)	14
Iceland (Tónlistinn)	9
Ireland (IRMA)	1
Israel (Mako Hitlist)	53
Italy (FIMI)	46
Italy Airplay (EarOne)	28
Japan Hot Overseas (Billboard Japan)	1
Latvia (LAIPA)	9
Latvia Airplay (LaIPA)	6
Lebanon Airplay (Lebanese Top 20)	5
Lithuania (AGATA)	19
Luxembourg (Billboard)	10
Malaysia (Billboard)	5
Malaysia International (RIM)	2
MENA (IFPI)	16
Netherlands (Dutch Top 40)	14
Netherlands (Single Top 100)	4
New Zealand (Recorded Music NZ)	1
Nigeria (TurnTable Top 100)	64
Norway (VG-lista)	6
Panama (Monitor Latino)	13
Panama (PRODUCE)	41
Philippines (Billboard)	5
Philippines Hot 100 (Billboard Philippines)	51
Poland (Polish Streaming Top 100)	22
Portugal (AFP)	7
Russia Airplay (TopHit)	22
San Marino (SMRTV Top 50)	23
Singapore (RIAS)	3
Slovakia Airplay (ČNS IFPI)	23
Slovakia Singles Digital (ČNS IFPI)	24
South Africa (Billboard)	24
South Korea (Circle)	177
Spain (Promusicae)	53
Sweden (Sverigetopplistan)	20
Switzerland (Schweizer Hitparade)	15
UK Singles (Official Charts)	1
US Billboard Hot 100	1
US Adult Contemporary (Billboard)	14
US Adult Pop Airplay (Billboard)	2
US Dance Airplay (Billboard)	4
US Pop Airplay (Billboard)	2
Vietnam Hot 100 (Billboard)	3

=== Monthly charts ===
Monthly chart performance
Chart (2023)	Peak position
CIS (TopHit)	27
Russia Airplay (TopHit)	34
South Korea (Circle)	198

=== Year-end charts ===
2023 year-end chart performance
Chart (2023)	Position
Australia (ARIA)	26
Austria (Ö3 Austria Top 40)	44
Belgium (Ultratop 50 Flanders)	84
Belgium (Ultratop 50 Wallonia)	33
Canada (Canadian Hot 100)	27
Global 200 (Billboard)	66
Iceland (Tónlistinn)	60
Netherlands (Dutch Top 40)	60
Netherlands (Single Top 100)	52
Russia Airplay (TopHit)	158
Switzerland (Schweizer Hitparade)	81
UK Singles (OCC)	14
US Billboard Hot 100	30
US Adult Contemporary (Billboard)	41
US Adult Top 40 (Billboard)	18
US Mainstream Top 40 (Billboard)	19

2024 year-end chart performance
Chart (2024)	Position
Australia (ARIA)	62
Canada (Canadian Hot 100)	35
Global 200 (Billboard)	60
Iceland (Tónlistinn)	86
Portugal (AFP)	172
UK Singles (OCC)	44
US Billboard Hot 100	57
US Adult Contemporary (Billboard)	45
US Adult Top 40 (Billboard)	42

== Certifications ==
Certifications
Region	Certification	Certified units/sales
Australia (ARIA)	6× Platinum	420,000^{‡}
Austria (IFPI Austria)	Platinum	30,000^{‡}
Belgium (BRMA)	Platinum	40,000^{‡}
Brazil (Pro-Música Brasil)	2× Diamond	320,000^{‡}
Canada (Music Canada)	8× Platinum	640,000^{‡}
Denmark (IFPI Danmark)	Platinum	90,000^{‡}
France (SNEP)	Diamond	333,333^{‡}
Germany (BVMI)	Gold	300,000^{‡}
Italy (FIMI)	Platinum	100,000^{‡}
Mexico (AMPROFON)	Platinum+Gold	210,000^{‡}
New Zealand (RMNZ)	3× Platinum	90,000^{‡}
Poland (ZPAV)	Platinum	50,000^{‡}
Portugal (AFP)	2× Platinum	20,000^{‡}
Spain (Promusicae)	Platinum	60,000^{‡}
Switzerland (IFPI Switzerland)	Gold	10,000^{‡}
United Kingdom (BPI)	3× Platinum	1,800,000^{‡}
United States (RIAA)	Platinum	1,000,000^{‡}
Streaming
Central America (CFC)	Platinum	7,000,000^{†}
Greece (IFPI Greece)	Gold	1,000,000^{†}
^{‡} Sales+streaming figures based on certification alone.^{†} Streaming-only figures based on certification alone.

== Release history ==
Release dates and formats
Region	Date	Format(s)	Label	Ref.
Various	June 30, 2023	7-inch; CD single; digital download; streaming	Geffen	
United States	July 4, 2023	Contemporary hit radio	Geffen; Interscope	
Italy	July 7, 2023	Radio airplay	Universal	
United Kingdom	August 29, 2023	Cassette	Polydor	

== See also ==
- List of Billboard Hot 100 number ones of 2023
- List of Canadian Hot 100 number-one singles of 2023
- List of number-one singles from the 2020s (New Zealand)
- List of number-one singles of 2023 (Australia)
- List of number-one singles of 2023 (Ireland)
- List of UK Singles Chart number ones of the 2020s
