= Conan Gray discography =

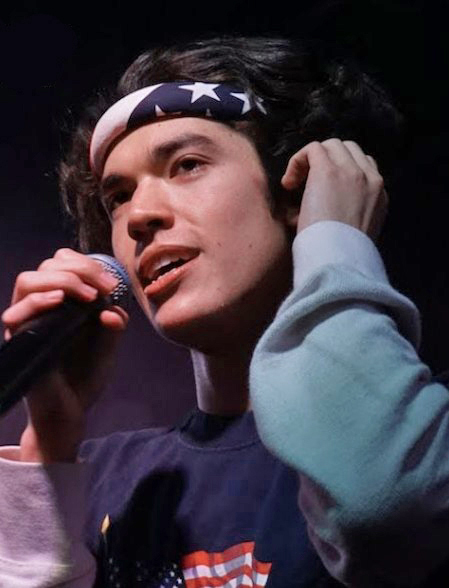
- Gray in 2019
- Studio albums: 4
- EPs: 1
- Singles: 30

The discography of American singer-songwriter Conan Gray consists of four studio albums, one extended play, and 30 singles. Gray began his 2017 with the release of his debut single "Idle Town". He released his debut extended play, Sunset Season, in November 2018, after signing with Republic Records. His debut studio album, Kid Krow, was released in March 2020, and contains his some of his most popular tracks, "Maniac" and "Heather". The album debuted at number five on the Billboard Hot 200. Gray would further release three more studio albums, including his latest, Wishbone, which became his highest charting album in the Billboard Hot 200, debuting at number three.

== Studio albums ==
Title	Details	Peak chart positions										Certifications
Title	Details	US	AUS	BEL (FL)	CAN	IRE	NLD	NOR	NZ	SPA	UK	Certifications
Kid Krow	Released: March 20, 2020; Label: Republic; Formats: CD, LP, digital download, streaming, cassette	5	26	49	4	20	43	32	32	39	30	RIAA: Platinum; BPI: Gold; MC: 2× Platinum; RMNZ: Platinum
Superache	Released: June 24, 2022; Label: Republic; Formats: CD, LP, digital download, streaming, cassette	9	8	14	24	8	9	38	11	13	8	ARIA: Gold; BPI: Gold; MC: Platinum; RMNZ: Gold
Found Heaven	Released: April 5, 2024; Label: Republic; Formats: CD, LP, digital download, streaming, cassette	14	10	8	98	26	12	—	33	15	4	
Wishbone	Released: August 15, 2025; Label: Republic; Formats: CD, LP, digital download, streaming	3	2	4	35	9	4	—	8	20	2	BPI: Silver
"—" denotes a recording that did not chart or was not released in that territory.

== Extended plays ==
Title	Details	Peak chart positions	
Title	Details	US	UK Down.
Sunset Season	Released: November 16, 2018; Label: Republic; Formats: CD, LP, DL, streaming	116	57

== Singles ==
Title	Year	Peak chart positions										Certifications	Album
Title	Year	US	AUS	CAN	IRE	NOR	NZ	SGP	SWE	UK	WW	Certifications	Album
"Idle Town"	2017	—	—	—	—	—	—	—	—	—	—		Sunset Season
"Grow"	2017	—	—	—	—	—	—	—	—	—	—		Non-album single
"Generation Why"	2018	—	—	—	—	—	—	—	—	—	—		Sunset Season
"Crush Culture"	2018	—	—	—	—	—	—	—	—	—	—	ARIA: Gold	Sunset Season
"The Other Side"	2019	—	—	—	—	—	—	—	—	—	—		Non-album singles
"The King"	2019	—	—	—	—	—	—	—	—	—	—		Non-album singles
"Checkmate"	2019	—	—	—	—	—	—	—	—	—	—		Kid Krow
"Comfort Crowd"	2019	—	—	—	—	—	—	—	—	—	—	RIAA: Gold	Kid Krow
"Maniac"	2019	— (Note: "Maniac" did not enter the Billboard Hot 100, but peaked at number 25 on the Bubbling Under Hot 100 Singles chart.)	24	—	83	—	— (Note: "Maniac" did not enter the NZ Top 40 Singles Chart, but peaked at number 29 on the NZ Hot Singles Chart.)	—	—	—	—	RIAA: 3× Platinum; ARIA: 4× Platinum; BPI: Gold; MC: 3× Platinum; RMNZ: 2× Platinum	Kid Krow
"The Story"	2020	—	—	—	—	—	— (Note: "The Story" did not enter the NZ Top 40 Singles Chart, but peaked at number 34 on the NZ Hot Singles Chart.)	—	—	—	—	RIAA: Gold; MC: Gold	Kid Krow
"Wish You Were Sober"	2020	—	—	—	—	—	— (Note: "Wish You Were Sober" did not enter the NZ Top 40 Singles Chart, but peaked at number 14 on the NZ Hot Singles Chart.)	—	—	—	—	RIAA: Gold; ARIA: Gold; RMNZ: Gold	Kid Krow
"Heather"	2020	46	13	26	12	21	13	2	41	17	20	RIAA: 5× Platinum; ARIA: 4× Platinum; BPI: Platinum; GLF: Gold; MC: 7× Platinum; RMNZ: 3× Platinum	Kid Krow
"Fake" (with Lauv)	2020	—	—	—	—	—	— (Note: "Fake" did not enter the NZ Top 40 Singles Chart, but peaked at number six on the NZ Hot Singles Chart.)	—	—	— (Note: "Fake" did not enter the UK Singles Chart, but peaked at number 48 on the UK Independent Singles Chart.)	180		Non-album singles
"Overdrive"	2021	—	—	—	—	—	— (Note: "Overdrive" did not enter the NZ Top 40 Singles Chart, but peaked at number 19 on the NZ Hot Singles Chart.)	—	—	—	—	ARIA: Gold	Non-album singles
"Astronomy "	2021	—	—	—	—	—	— (Note: "Astronomy" did not enter the NZ Top 40 Singles Chart, but peaked at number 15 on the NZ Hot Singles Chart.)	—	—	—	—	RIAA: Platinum; ARIA: Gold; MC: Platinum; RMNZ: Gold	Superache
"People Watching"	2021	—	—	—	—	—	— (Note: "People Watching" did not enter the NZ Top 40 Singles Chart, but peaked at number 22 on the NZ Hot Singles Chart.)	25	—	—	—	ARIA: Platinum; BPI: Silver; MC: Platinum; RMNZ: Platinum	Superache
"Telepath"	2021	—	—	—	88	—	— (Note: "Telepath" did not enter the NZ Top 40 Singles Chart, but peaked at number 17 on the NZ Hot Singles Chart.)	—	—	—	—		Non-album single
"Jigsaw"	2022	— (Note: "Jigsaw" did not enter the Billboard Hot 100, but peaked at number 27 on the Hot Rock & Alternative Songs chart.)	—	—	—	—	— (Note: "Jigsaw" did not enter the NZ Top 40 Singles Chart, but peaked at number 18 on the NZ Hot Singles Chart.)	—	—	—	—		Superache
"Memories"	2022	— (Note: "Memories" did not enter the Billboard Hot 100, but peaked at number 14 on the Bubbling Under Hot 100 Singles chart.)	—	75	69	—	— (Note: "Memories" did not enter the NZ Top 40 Singles Chart, but peaked at number six on the NZ Hot Singles Chart.)	—	—	—	—	RIAA: Platinum; ARIA: Platinum; BPI: Silver; MC: Platinum; RMNZ: Gold	Superache
"Yours"	2022	—	—	—	—	—	— (Note: "Yours" did not enter the NZ Top 40 Singles Chart, but peaked at number 15 on the NZ Hot Singles Chart.)	—	—	—	—		Superache
"Disaster"	2022	—	—	—	—	—	— (Note: "Disaster" did not enter the NZ Top 40 Singles Chart, but peaked at number 16 on the NZ Hot Singles Chart.)	—	—	—	—		Superache
"Never Ending Song"	2023	—	—	—	—	—	— (Note: "Never Ending Song" did not enter the NZ Top 40 Singles Chart, but peaked at number nine on the NZ Hot Singles Chart.)	—	—	—	—		Found Heaven
"Winner"	2023	—	—	—	—	—	— (Note: "Winner" did not enter the NZ Top 40 Singles Chart, but peaked at number 11 on the NZ Hot Singles Chart.)	—	—	—	—		Found Heaven
"Killing Me"	2023	—	—	—	—	—	— (Note: "Killing Me" did not enter the NZ Top 40 Singles Chart, but peaked at number 30 on the NZ Hot Singles Chart.)	—	—	—	—		Found Heaven
"Lonely Dancers"	2024	—	—	—	—	—	— (Note: "Lonely Dancers" did not enter the NZ Top 40 Singles Chart, but peaked at number 22 on the NZ Hot Singles Chart.)	—	—	—	—		Found Heaven
"Alley Rose"	2024	—	—	—	—	—	— (Note: "Alley Rose" did not enter the NZ Top 40 Singles Chart, but peaked at number 13 on the NZ Hot Singles Chart.)	—	—	—	—		Found Heaven
"Holidays"	2024	—	—	—	—	—	— (Note: "Holidays" did not enter the NZ Top 40 Singles Chart, but peaked at number 21 on the NZ Hot Singles Chart.)	—	—	—	—		Non-album single
"This Song"	2025	—	—	—	—	—	— (Note: "This Song" did not enter the NZ Top 40 Singles Chart, but peaked at number 8 on the NZ Hot Singles Chart.)	—	—	—	—		Wishbone
"Vodka Cranberry"	2025	— (Note: "Vodka Cranberry" did not enter the Billboard Hot 100, but peaked at number 11 on the Bubbling Under Hot 100 chart.)	—	—	93	—	— (Note: "Vodka Cranberry" did not enter the NZ Top 40 Singles Chart, but peaked at number 17 on the NZ Hot Singles Chart.)	—	—	93	—		Wishbone
"Caramel"	2025	—	—	—	—	—	— (Note: "Caramel" did not enter the NZ Top 40 Singles Chart, but peaked at number eight on the NZ Hot Singles Chart.)	—	—	—	—		Wishbone
"The Best"	2026	— (Note: "The Best" did not enter the Billboard Hot 100, but peaked at number 25 on the Bubbling Under Hot 100 chart.)	—	—	—	—	— (Note: "The Best" did not enter the NZ Top 40 Singles Chart, but peaked at number 10 on the NZ Hot Singles Chart.)	—	—	—	—		Wishbone Deluxe
"—" denotes a recording that did not chart or was not released in that territory.

== Other charted and certified songs ==
Title	Year	Peak chart positions		Certifications	Album
Title	Year	IRE	NZ Hot	Certifications	Album
"Lookalike"	2018	—	—	ARIA: Gold	Sunset Season
"Affluenza"	2020	—	36		Kid Krow
"The Cut That Always Bleeds"	2020	—	—	RIAA: Platinum; ARIA: Gold; BPI: Silver; RMNZ: Gold	Kid Krow
"Movies"	2022	—	28		Superache
"Family Line"	2022	90	24	ARIA: Platinum; BPI: Silver; MC: Platinum; RMNZ: Gold	Superache
"Best Friend"	2022	—	32		Superache
"The Exit"	2022	—	—	RIAA: Gold; ARIA: Gold	Superache
"Fainted Love"	2024	—	36		Found Heaven
"Bourgeoisieses"	2024	—	39		Found Heaven
"Actor"	2025	—	5		Wishbone
"My World"	2025	—	16		Wishbone
"Eleven Eleven"	2025	—	13		Wishbone
"Do I Dare"	2026	—	35		Wishbone Deluxe
"House That Always Rains"	2026	—	32		Wishbone Deluxe
"Door"	2026	—	12		Wishbone Deluxe
"Moths"	2026	—	22		Wishbone Deluxe
"—" denotes a recording that did not chart or was not released in that territory.

== See also ==
- List of songs by Conan Gray
