= List of songs by Conan Gray =

Songs by American singer-songwriter

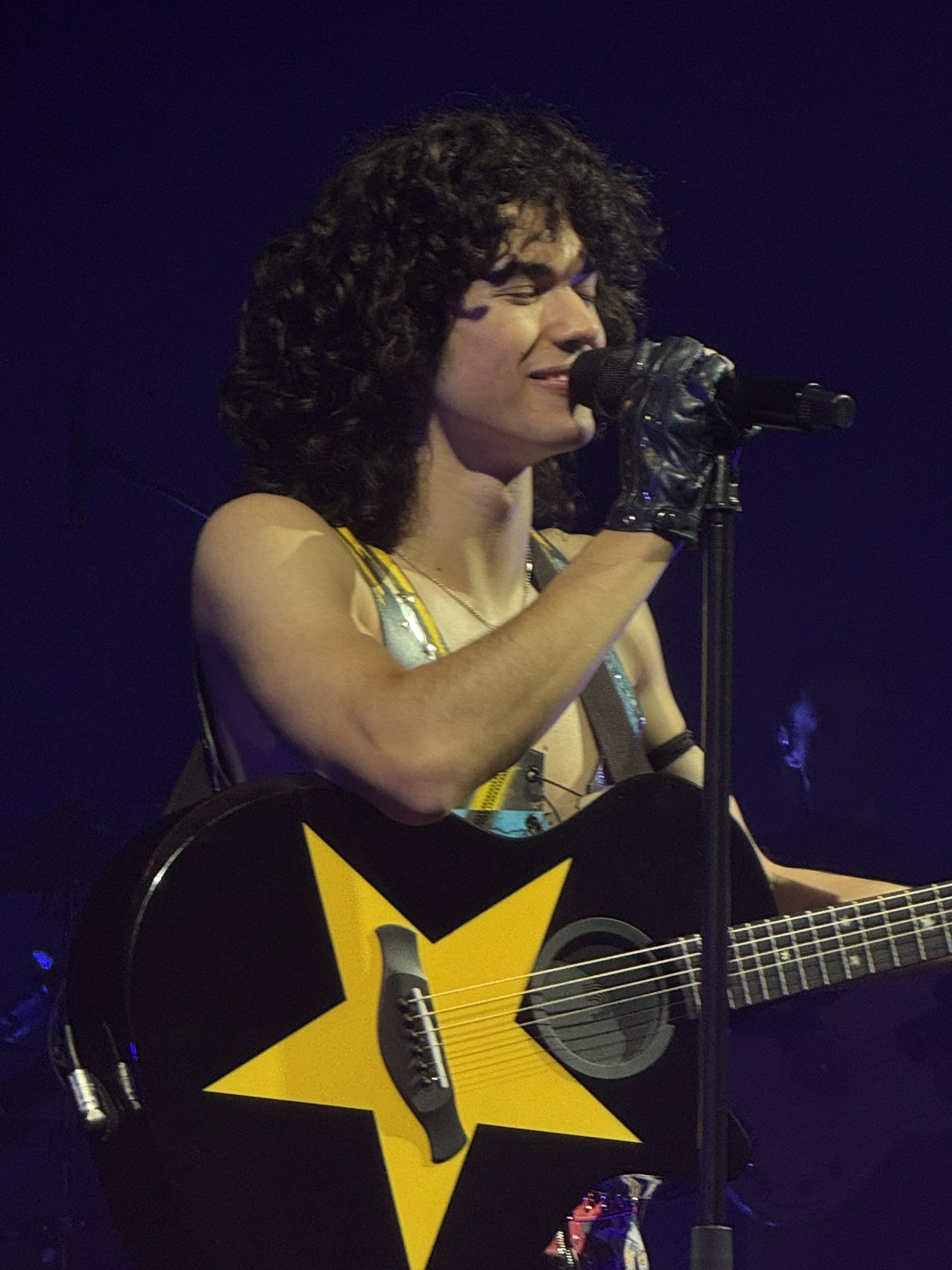
Gray (pictured in 2024) performing during Found Heaven On Tour

Conan Gray is an American singer-songwriter and who began his musical career by publishing covers and original songs to YouTube in 2013. Universal Music Group signed Gray to Republic Records in 2018; he then released his debut extended play, Sunset Season, after dropping out of University of California, Los Angeles (UCLA) to pursue music professionally. Gray has since released four studio albums: Kid Krow in 2020, Superache in 2022, Found Heaven in 2024, and Wishbone in 2025. Additionally, the first album was rereleased on its fifth anniversary in 2025 under the title Kid Krow, Decomposed, while the fourth album received a deluxe release in 2026.

Gray largely writes and performs his own discography, and frequently co-writes with other songwriters. His most frequent collaborator is his producer Dan Nigro, who has made contributions to each of the aforementioned releases, with the exception of the third album. Found Heaven was primarily written with Oscar Holter and Max Martin. Elvira Anderfjärd, Luka Kloser, and Ilya Salmanzadeh have also contributed to multiple albums. Gray has stated that he only prefers musical collaborations with artists with whom he has a pre-existing relationship, and although he worries that collaborating may ruin these connections, he has sung with Cavetown, Lauv, and Olivia Rodrigo.

== Songs ==
Key
†	Indicates a cover
‡	Indicates a song written solely by Gray
#	Indicates a song with background vocals by Gray (Note: Not utilized for tracks in which Gray is also the lead vocalist)

=== Released ===
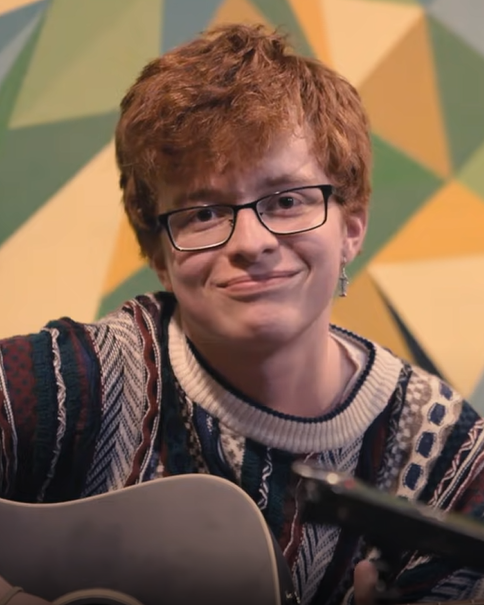
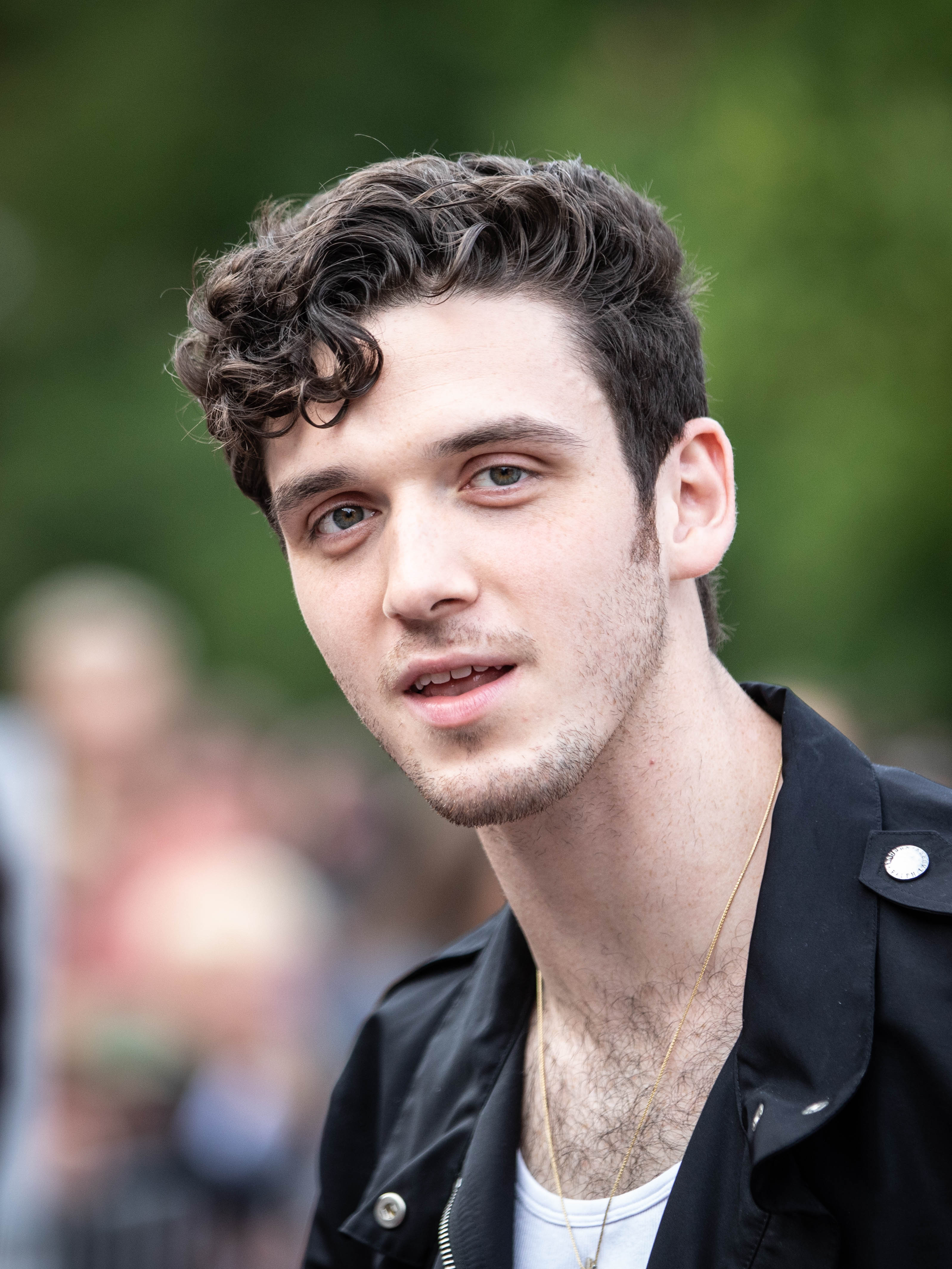
Gray has collaborated on songs with both Cavetown (top, pictured in 2018) and Lauv (bottom, pictured in 2018).
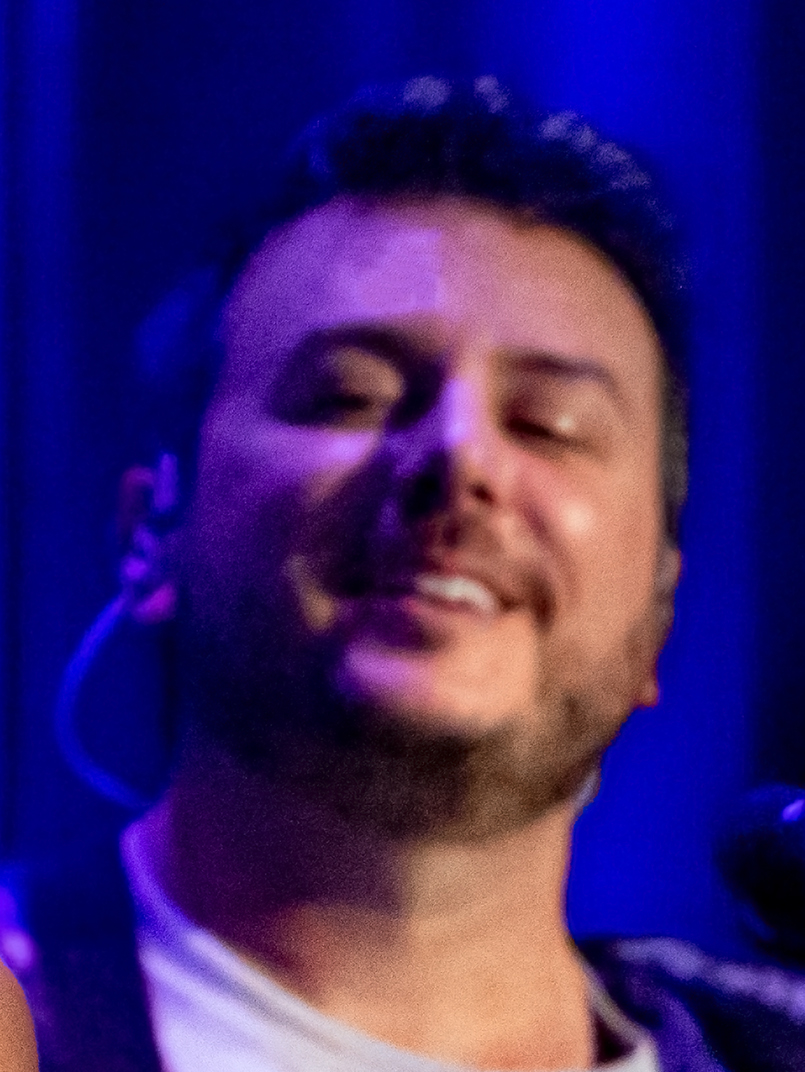
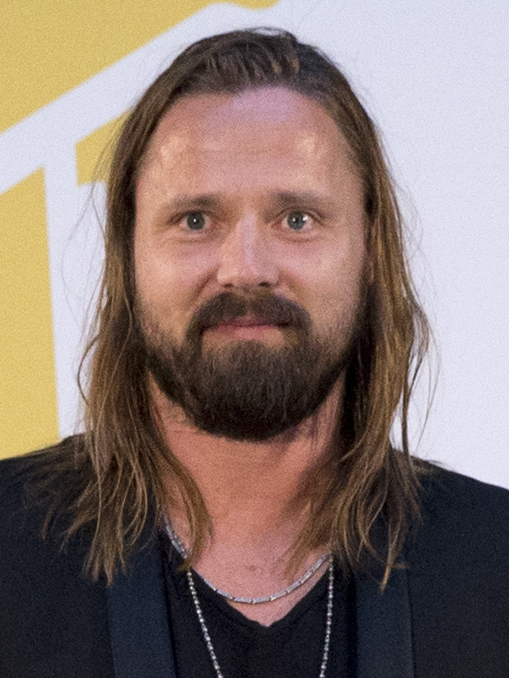
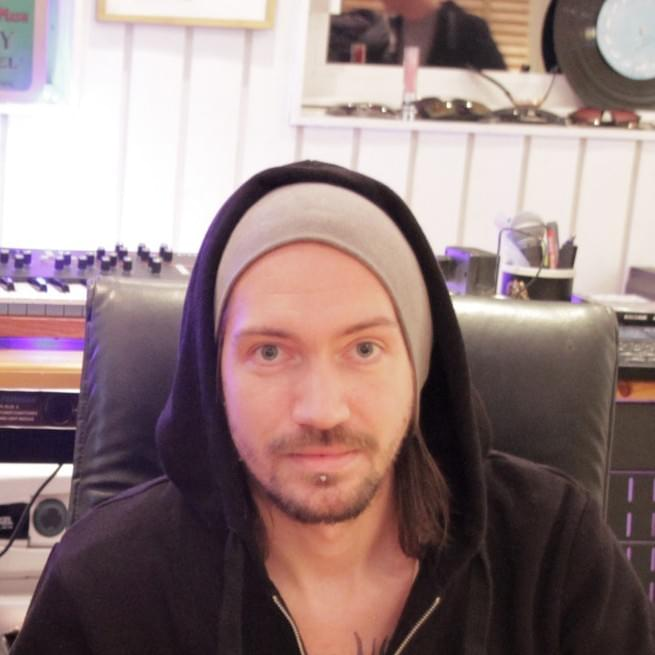
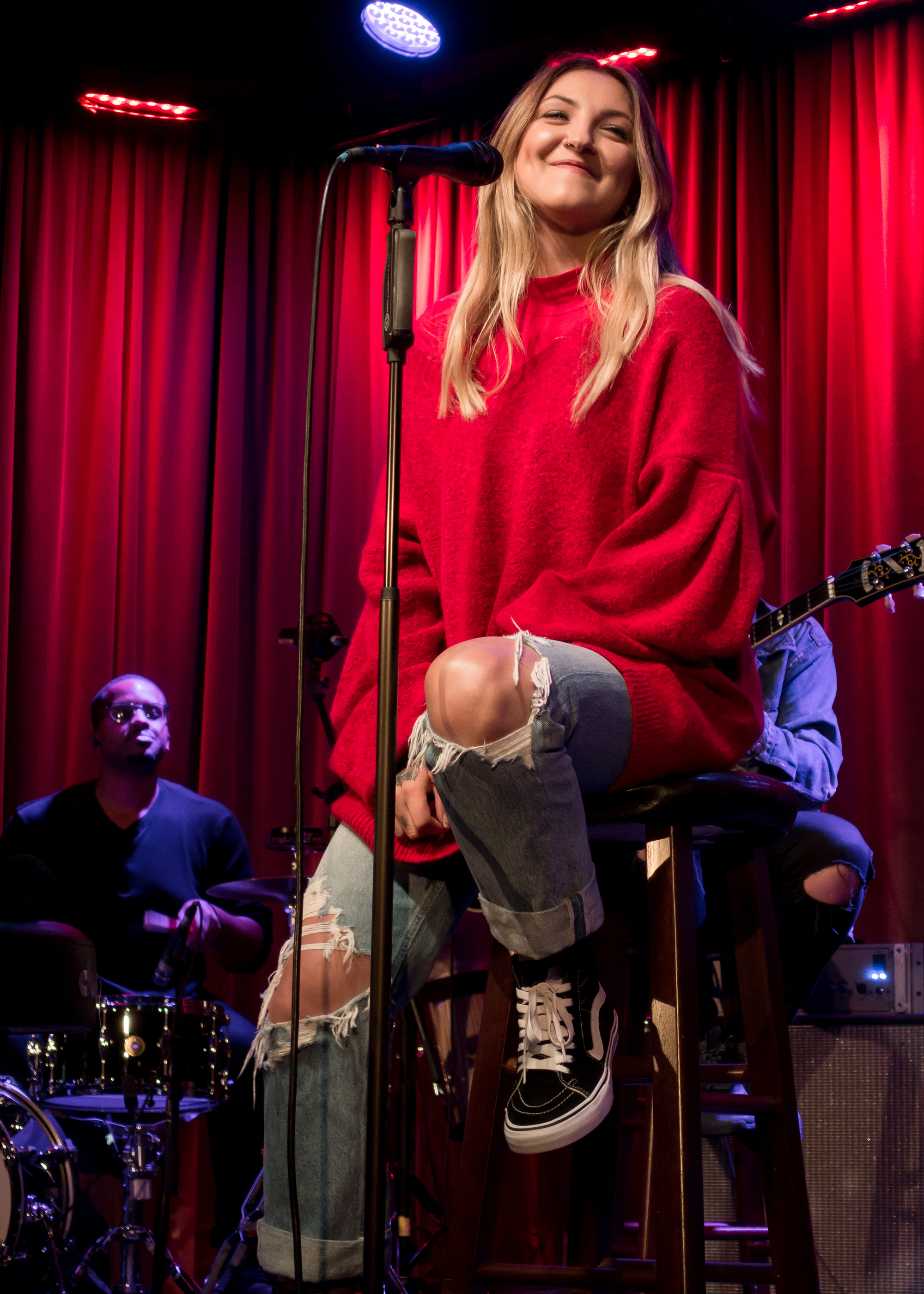
Gray has co-written many songs with others, including multiple with Dan Nigro (first, pictured in 2023), Max Martin (second, pictured in 2015), Oscar Holter (third, pictured in 2014), and Julia Michaels (fourth, pictured in 2017).
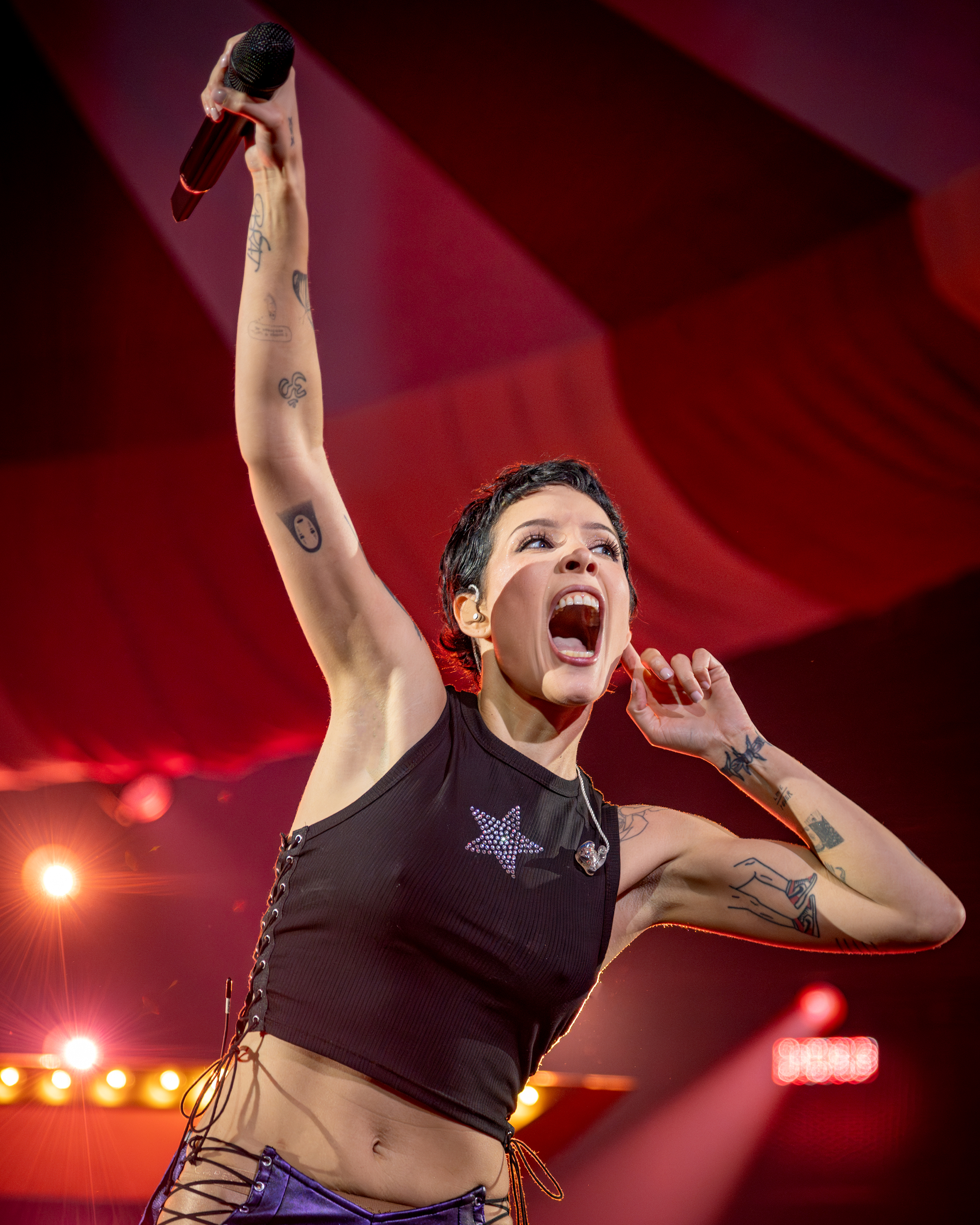
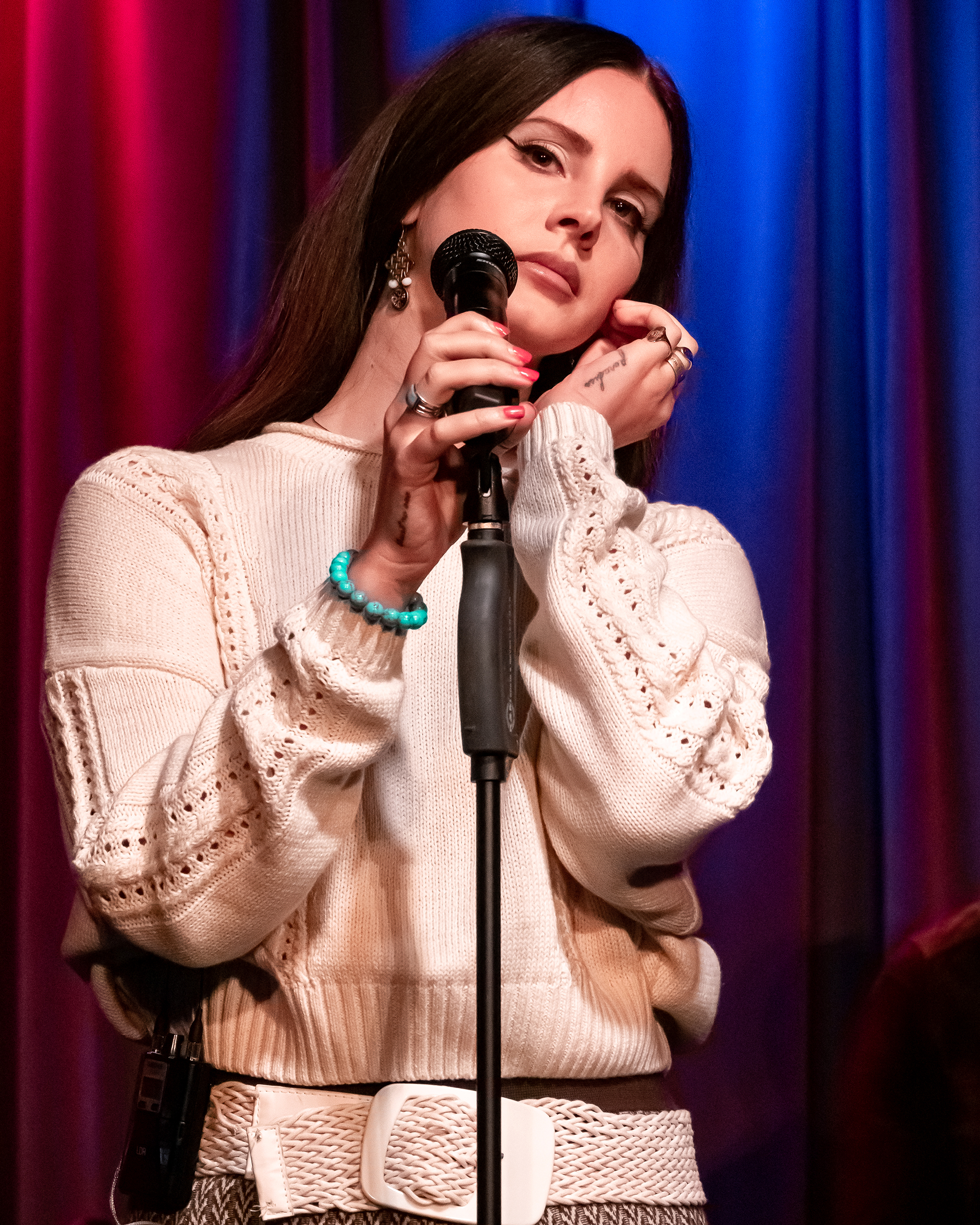
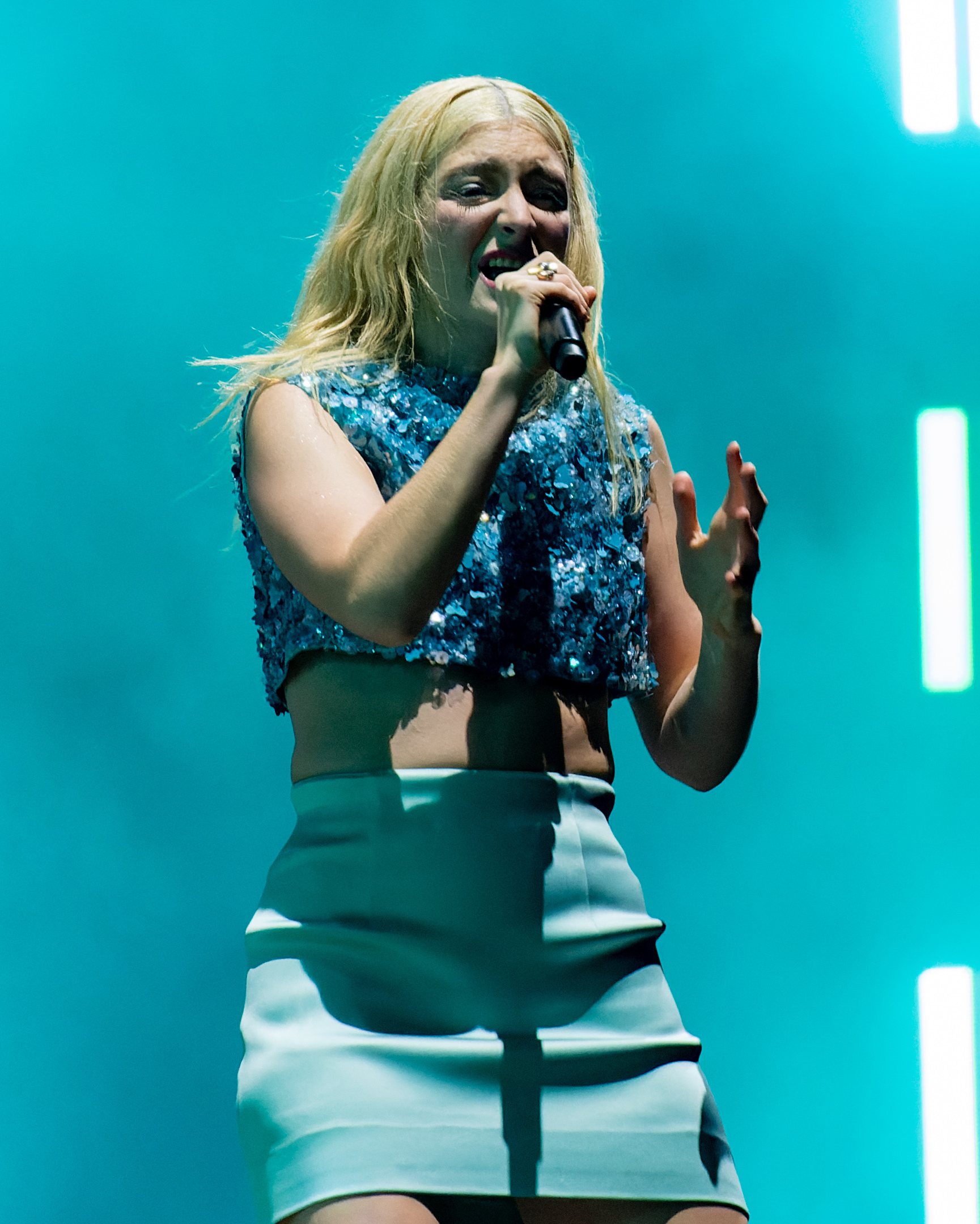
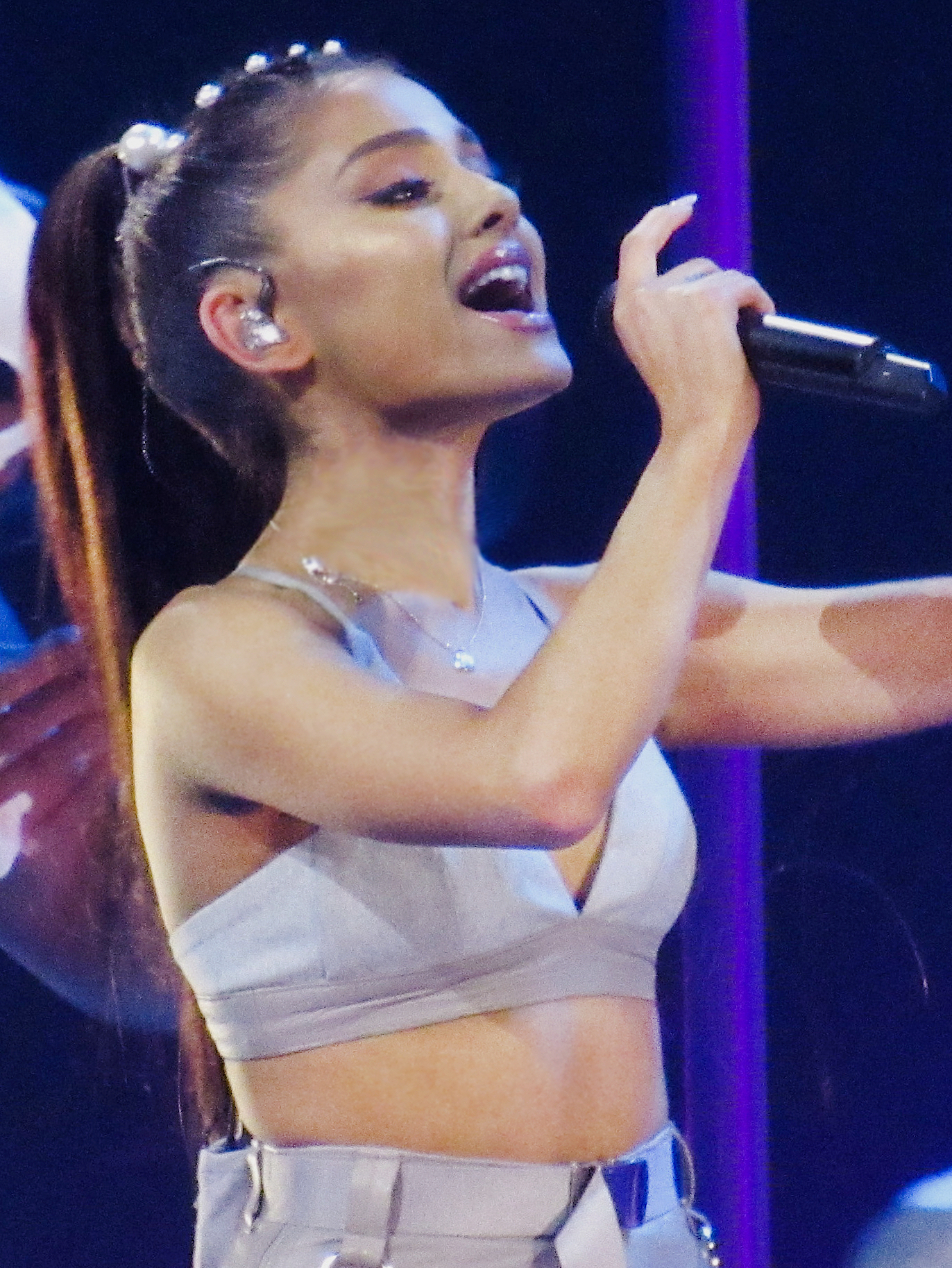
Gray has covered songs by other artists, including two each from Halsey (first, pictured in 2024), Lana Del Rey (second, pictured in 2019), Lorde (third, pictured in 2025), and Ariana Grande (fourth, pictured in 2017).

List of Conan Gray released songs
Title	Writer(s)	Album/EP	Year	Ref(s).
"(Can We Be Friends?)"	Conan Gray‡	Kid Krow	2020	
"(Online Love)"	Conan Gray‡	Kid Krow	2020	
"Actor"	Conan Gray; Dan Nigro	Wishbone	2025	
"Affluenza"	Conan Gray; Dan Nigro	Kid Krow	2020	
"Alley Rose"	Conan Gray‡	Found Heaven	2024	
"Antics"	Conan Gray‡	Non-album single (Note: This single was released on Gray's YouTube channel prior to signing a record deal.)	2015	
"Astronomy"	Conan Gray; Dan Nigro	Superache	2021	
"Bed Rest"	Conan Gray‡	Kid Krow, Decomposed	2025	
"Best Friend"	Conan Gray; Dan Nigro	Superache	2022	
"The Best"	Conan Gray; Jon Buscema	Wishbone Deluxe	2026	
"Blackbird" (Note: Originally performed by The Beatles)†	Lennon–McCartney	Non-album single	2015	
"Bobby" (Note: Originally performed by Alex G)† (with Cavetown)	Alex G	Non-album single	2017	
"Bourgeoisieses"	Conan Gray; Max Grahn; Luka Kloser	Found Heaven	2024	
"Boys & Girls"	Conan Gray; Max Martin; Oscar Holter	Found Heaven	2024	
"Candles" (Note: Originally performed by Daughter)†	Elena Tonra	Non-album single	2017	
"Caramel"	Conan Gray; Dan Nigro	Wishbone	2025	
"Care"	Conan Gray; Dan Nigro; Noah Conrad	Wishbone	2025	
"Checkmate"	Conan Gray‡	Kid Krow	2020	
"Class Clown"	Conan Gray‡	Wishbone	2025	
"Closer" (Note: Originally performed by The Chainsmokers featuring Halsey)†	Andrew Taggart; Ashley Frangipane; Shaun Frank; Frederic Kennett; Isaac Slade; Joe King	Non-album single	2016	
"Comfort Crowd"	Conan Gray; Dan Nigro	Kid Krow	2020	
"Connell"	Conan Gray‡	Wishbone	2025	
"Crush Culture"	Conan Gray‡	Sunset Season	2018	
"The Cut That Always Bleeds" (Note: A live version of this song was released on Kid Krow, Decomposed in 2025.)	Conan Gray‡	Kid Krow	2020	
"Daydreamer" (Note: Originally performed by Adele)†	Adele Adkins	Non-album single	2015	
"Daydreamin'" (Note: Originally performed by Ariana Grande)†	Matt Squire; Thomas Lee Brown; Victoria McCants	Non-album single	2015	
"Disaster"	Conan Gray; Henry Walter; Julia Michaels	Superache	2022	
"Do I Dare"	Conan Gray; Noah Conrad	Wishbone Deluxe	2026	
"Door"	Conan Gray; Jon Buscema	Wishbone Deluxe	2026	
"Dream a Little Dream of Me" (Note: Originally performed by Ozzie Nelson)†	Fabian Andre; Wilbur Schwandt; Gus Kahn	Non-album single	2018	
"Eleven Eleven"	Conan Gray‡	Wishbone	2025	
"The Exit"	Conan Gray; Dan Nigro; Julia Michaels	Superache	2022	
"Eye of the Night"	Conan Gray‡	Found Heaven	2024	
"Fainted Love"	Conan Gray; Max Martin	Found Heaven	2024	
"Fake" (with Lauv)	Ari Leff; Conan Gray; Jacob Kasher Hindlin; Jonathan Simpson	Non-album single	2020	
"Family Line"	Conan Gray; Dan Nigro	Superache	2022	
"Fight or Flight"	Conan Gray‡	Kid Krow	2020	
"The Final Fight"	Conan Gray; Max Martin; Oscar Holter; Ilya Salmanzadeh	Found Heaven	2024	
"Footnote"	Conan Gray; Dan Nigro	Superache	2022	
"Forever With Me"	Conan Gray; Greg Kurstin	Found Heaven	2024	
"Found Heaven"	Conan Gray‡	Found Heaven	2024	
"Generation Why"	Conan Gray‡	Sunset Season	2018	
"Greek God"	Conan Gray‡	Sunset Season	2018	
"Grow"	Conan Gray‡	Non-album single	2018	
"Heather" (Note: An extended live edition of this song, subtitled the "Lost Verse Version", was released as a single in 2024, and on Kid Krow, Decomposed in 2025.)	Conan Gray‡	Kid Krow	2020	
"Holidays"	Conan Gray‡	Non-album single	2024	
"Honeybee"	Conan Gray‡	Non-album single	2016	
"Honeybee"# (performed by Olivia Rodrigo)	Olivia Rodrigo	You Seem Pretty Sad for a Girl So in Love	2026	
"Disaster"	Conan Gray; Henry Walter; Julia Michaels	Superache	2022	
"House That Always Rains"	Conan Gray; Noah Conrad	Wishbone Deluxe	2026	
"I Know a Place"	Conan Gray‡	Non-album single	2017	
"I Will Always Love You" (Note: Originally performed by Dolly Parton)†	Dolly Parton	Non-album single	2018	
"I'll Make Cereal"# (performed by Cavetown)	Robin Skinner; Conan Gray (Note: Credited as writing background vocals only)	Lemon Boy	2018	
"Idle Town"	Conan Gray‡	Sunset Season	2017	
"ILYSB" (Note: Originally performed by LANY)†	Jake Goss; Paul Klein; Charles Priest; Oskar Engstrom	Non-album single	2018	
"Jigsaw"	Conan Gray; Dan Nigro	Superache	2022	
"Killing Me"	Conan Gray; Max Martin; Oscar Holter	Found Heaven	2023	
"The King"	Conan Gray; Dan Nigro	Non-album single	2019	
"Liability" (Note: Originally performed by Lorde) (Note: Includes "Liability (Reprise)")†	Ella Yelich-O'Connor; Jack Antonoff	Non-album single	2017	
"Little League"	Conan Gray; Ben Berger; Ryan McMahon; Ryan Rabin	Kid Krow	2020	
"Lonely Dancers"	Conan Gray; Max Martin; Oscar Holter; Ilya Salmanzadeh	Superache	2024	
"Lookalike"	Conan Gray‡	Sunset Season	2018	
"Love Is a Losing Game" (Note: Originally performed by Amy Winehouse)†	Amy Winehouse	Non-album single	2015	
"Love Story" (Note: Originally performed by Taylor Swift)†	Taylor Swift	Non-album single (Note: This single was originally released on MTV Australia's YouTube channel.)	2020	
"Lovesick Boys"	Conan Gray‡	Non-album single	2016	
"Maniac"	Conan Gray; Dan Nigro	Kid Krow	2020	
"Memories"	Conan Gray; Dan Nigro	Superache	2022	
"Miss You"	Conan Gray; Max Martin; Oscar Holter	Found Heaven	2024	
"Moon River" (Note: Originally performed by Audrey Hepburn)†	Henry Mancini; Johnny Mercer	Non-album single	2018	
"Moths"	Conan Gray; Noah Conrad; Annika Bennett	Wishbone Deluxe	2026	
"Movies"	Conan Gray; Dan Nigro	Superache	2022	
"My World"	Conan Gray‡	Wishbone	2025	
"Nauseous"	Conan Gray‡	Wishbone	2025	
"Never Ending Song"	Conan Gray; Max Martin; Ilya Salmanzadeh	Found Heaven	2023	
"The Other Side"	Conan Gray‡	Non-album single	2019	
"Overdrive"	Conan Gray; Oliver Peterhof; Chris Stracey; Jordan K. Johnson; The Monsters & Strangerz; Tobias Jesso Jr.	Non-album single (Note: This single was released as a bonus track on the Japanese CD edition of Superache.)	2021	
"People Watching"	Conan Gray; Dan Nigro; Julia Michaels	Superache	2021	
"Radio" (Note: Originally performed by Lana Del Rey)†	Elizabeth Grant; Justin Parker	Non-album single	2017	
"Romeo"	Conan Gray; Noah Conrad	Wishbone	2025	
"Save Your Tears" (Note: Originally performed by The Weeknd featuring Ariana Grande)†	Abel Tesfaye; Ahmad Balshe; Jason Quenneville; Max Martin; Oscar Holter; Ariana Grande	Non-album single (Note: This single was first released on Fender's YouTube channel as part of the "Re-Creation Remixed" series.)	2021	
"See Right Through"	Conan Gray‡	Non-album single	2016	
"Somebody Else" (Note: Originally performed by The 1975)†	Matthew Healy; George Daniel; Adam Hann; Ross MacDonald	Non-album single	2018	
"Sometime"	Conan Gray‡	Non-album single	2015	
"The Story"	Conan Gray‡	Kid Krow	2020	
"The Subway" (Note: Originally performed by Chappell Roan)†	Chappell Roan; Dan Nigro	Non-album single (Note: This single was first released on BBC Radio 1 during a Live Lounge segment.)	2025	
"Summer Child"	Conan Gray‡	Superache	2022	
"Sunset Tower"	Conan Gray; Elvira Anderfjärd; Luka Kloser	Wishbone	2025	
"Sweater Weather" (Note: Originally performed by The Neighbourhood)†	Jesse Rutherford; Zach Abels; Jeremy Freedman	Non-album single	2018	
"Team"†	Ella Yelich-O'Connor; Joel Little	Non-album single	2018	
"Telepath"	Conan Gray; Julia Michaels; Ilya Salmanzadeh; Caroline Ailin	Non-album single	2021	
"Thinkin Bout You" (Note: Originally performed by Frank Ocean)†	Christopher Breaux; Robert Taylor	Non-album single	2017	
"This Song"	Conan Gray‡	Wishbone	2025	
"To Make You Feel My Love" (Note: Originally performed by Bob Dylan)†	Bob Dylan	Non-album single	2014	
"Treehouse"	Conan Gray‡	Non-album single	2017	
"Video Games"†	Elizabeth Grant; Justin Parker	Non-album single	2018	
"Vodka Cranberry"	Conan Gray; Dan Nigro	Wishbone	2025	
"Wild" (Note: Originally performed by Troye Sivan)†	Troye Sivan; Alex Hope	Non-album single	2016	
"Winner"	Conan Gray; Greg Kurstin	Found Heaven	2023	
"Wish You Were Sober"	Conan Gray; Dan Nigro	Kid Krow	2020	
"You Think I'm Crazy"	Conan Gray‡	Non-album single	2016	
"Yours"	Conan Gray; Dan Nigro	Superache	2022	

=== Unreleased ===
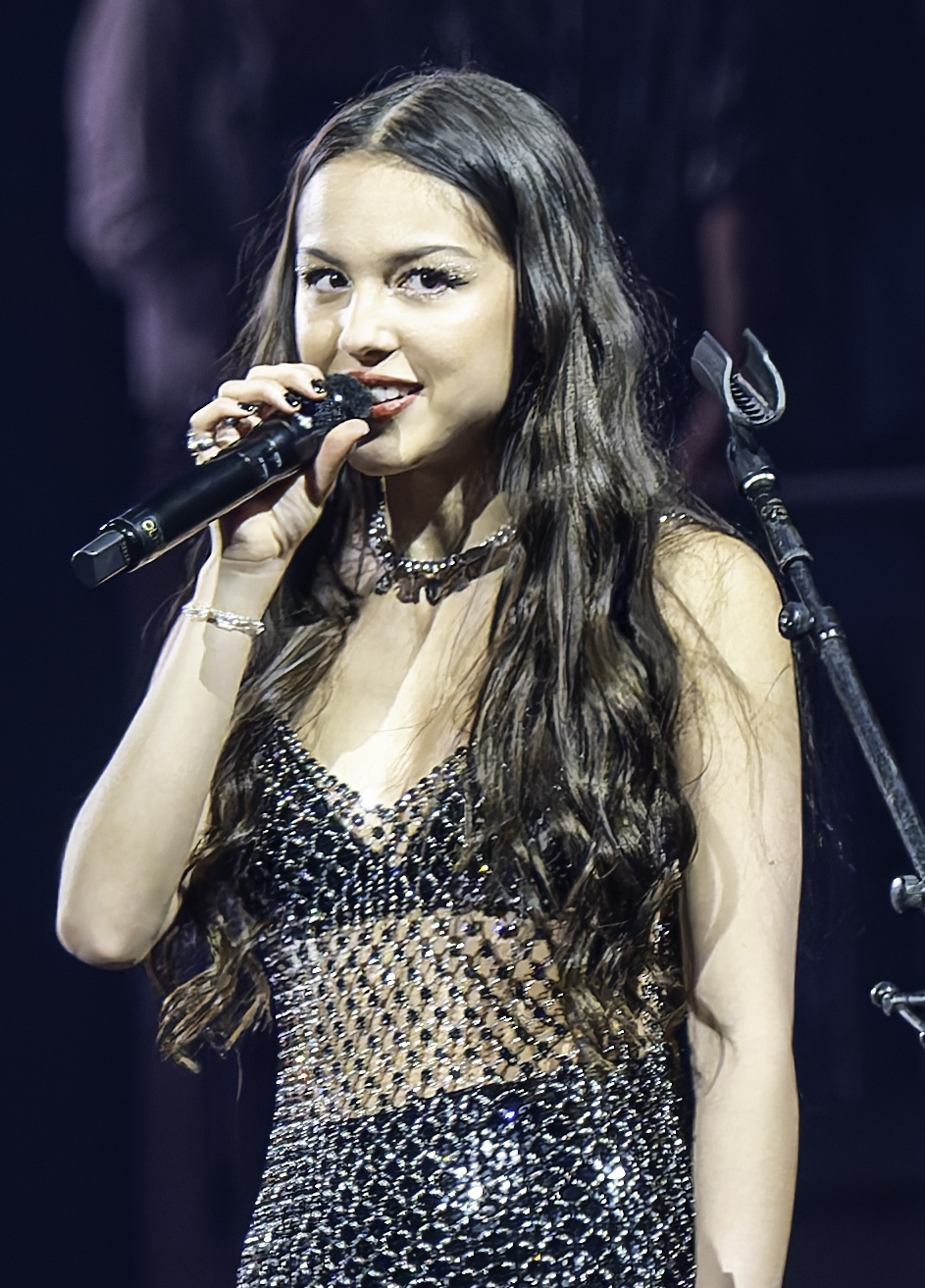
Gray has written and sung with Olivia Rodrigo (pictured in 2024), his best friend, with whom he shares a producer.

In addition to those below, Gray revealed that he wrote more than 200 songs for Kid Krow, several while touring for Superache that were not released on Found Heaven, and over 300 for Wishbone.

List of Conan Gray unreleased songs
Title	Writer(s)	Notes	Ref(s).
"1000 Things" (Artist unknown)	Conan Gray; Ben Ash	Registered by Broadcast Music, Inc. (BMI)	
"Dreamlike" (with Olivia Rodrigo and Flowers)	Conan Gray; Santi Ponce; Olivia Rodrigo	In separate interviews, Gray admitted to having written with Rodrigo, but referred to this song as only being a rumor.; Registered by the American Society of Composers, Authors and Publishers (ASCAP)	
"I Saw You Crying"	Conan Gray‡	Title and meaning revealed in an interview	
"Jolene" (Note: Originally performed by Dolly Parton)†	Dolly Parton	Performed during Gray's set at the 2025 Governors Ball Music Festival; Partial social media release	
"No Deal" (for Orval Roscupo and Rod Wave)	Semuel Dua; Conan Gray; Rod Green; Sergei Kharamov; Julia Michaels; Dan Nigro; Dawson Odegard	Registered by BMI	
"Ocean Eyes" (Note: Originally performed by Billie Eilish)†	Finneas O'Connell	Partial Twitter release	
"The One That Got Away" (Note: Originally performed by Katy Perry)† (with Olivia Rodrigo)	Katy Perry; Lukasz Gottwald; Max Martin	Performed in Vancouver, Canada, during Rodrigo's Sour Tour	
"Slow Burn" (Note: Originally performed by Kacey Musgraves)†	Kacey Musgraves; Daniel Tashian; Ian Fitchuk	Partial Twitter release	
"Those Days"	Conan Gray‡	Gray's first song; Written by Gray at age 12; Previously released	
"Without Me" (Note: Originally performed by Halsey)†	Ashley Frangipane; Brittany Amaradio; Amy Allen; Louis Bell; Justin Timberlake; Timothy Mosley; Scott Storch; Carl Rosen	Partial Twitter release	
"YouTube Is Changing"	Conan Gray‡	Previously released; Registered by ASCAP	
