= Found Heaven On Tour =

2024 concert tour by Conan Gray

- Tour by Conan Gray
- Promotional poster for the Australian leg
- Location: Oceania; Asia; North America; Europe
- Associated album: Found Heaven
- Start date: July 11, 2024
- End date: November 10, 2024
- Legs: 4
- No. of shows: 40
- Supporting acts: Kat Edwards; Maisie Peters; Between Friends

Conan Gray concert chronology
- Superache Tour (2022–23); Found Heaven On Tour (2024); The Wishbone Pajama Show (2025)

Found Heaven On Tour was the fifth headlining tour by American singer-songwriter Conan Gray, in support of his third studio album, Found Heaven (2024). The tour began on July 11, 2024 in Melbourne, Australia and concluded on November 10, 2024 in London, England. The tour visited seven countries across three continents, comprising 40 shows. Kat Edwards, Maisie Peters and Between Friends served as the opening acts.

== Set list ==
The following set list is obtained from the July 13, 2024 show in Brisbane, Australia. It is not intended to represent all dates throughout the tour.

1. "Fainted Love"
2. "Never Ending Song"
3. "Wish You Were Sober"
4. "Eye Of The Night"
5. "Killing Me"
6. "The Exit"
7. "People Watching"
8. "The Cut That Always Bleeds"
9. "Jigsaw"
10. "Family Line"
11. "The Story"
12. "Astronomy"
13. "Found Heaven"
14. "Boys & Girls"
15. "Lonely Dancers"
16. "Winner"
17. "Heather"
18. "Memories"

Encore

19. "Bourgeoisieses"
20. "Maniac"
21. "Alley Rose"

Alterations

On September 30, 2024, Gray debuted his single, "Holidays", in New York at Madison Square Garden. The song was then added to the set list for the remaining portion of the tour.

== Tour dates ==
List of concerts
Date (2024)	City	Country	Venue	Opening act(s)	Attendance	Revenue
July 11	Melbourne	Australia	John Cain Arena	Kat Edwards	—	—
July 13	Brisbane	Australia	Fortitude Music Hall	Kat Edwards	—	—
July 14	Brisbane	Australia	Fortitude Music Hall	Kat Edwards	—	—
July 17	Sydney	Australia	ICC Sydney Theatre	Kat Edwards	—	—
July 19 (Note: This concert is part of Spin Off Festival.)	Adelaide	Australia	Adelaide Showground	—N/a	—N/a	—N/a
August 1 (Note: This concert is part of Lollapalooza.)	Chicago	United States	Grant Park	—N/a	—N/a	—N/a
August 23 (Note: This concert is part of LaLaLa Festival.)	Jakarta	Indonesia	Jakarta International Expo	—N/a	—N/a	—N/a
August 27	Hong Kong	China	AsiaWorld–Expo	—N/a	—	—
September 1	Singapore		Singapore Indoor Stadium	—N/a	—	—
September 3	Bangkok	Thailand	UOB Live	—N/a	—	—
September 6	Seoul	South Korea	KBS Arena Hall	—N/a	—	—
September 7	Seoul	South Korea	KBS Arena Hall	—N/a	—	—
September 9	Tokyo	Japan	Tokyo Garden Theater	—N/a	—	—
September 19	Minneapolis	United States	Minneapolis Armory	Maisie Peters	—	—
September 21	Sterling Heights	United States	Michigan Lottery Amphitheatre	Maisie Peters	—	—
September 23	Toronto	Canada	Budweiser Stage	Maisie Peters	—	—
September 25	Boston	United States	MGM Music Hall at Fenway	Maisie Peters	—	—
September 26	Boston	United States	MGM Music Hall at Fenway	Maisie Peters	—	—
September 29 (Note: This concert is part of All Things Go Music Festival.)	Columbia (Note: Promoted as Washington, D.C.)	United States	Merriweather Post Pavilion	—N/a	—N/a	—N/a
September 30	New York	United States	Madison Square Garden	Maisie Peters	—	—
October 1	Philadelphia	United States	Skyline Stage	Maisie Peters	—	—
October 3	Raleigh	United States	Red Hat Amphitheater	Maisie Peters	—	—
October 4	Atlanta	United States	Cadence Bank Amphitheatre	Maisie Peters	—	—
October 6	Indianapolis	United States	Everwise Amphitheater	Maisie Peters	—	—
October 11	Paradise (Note: Promoted as Las Vegas)	United States	Chelsea Ballroom	Maisie Peters	—	—
October 13	Portland	United States	Theater of the Clouds	Maisie Peters	—	—
October 15	Seattle	United States	WaMu Theater	Maisie Peters	—	—
October 17	San Francisco	United States	Bill Graham Civic Auditorium	Maisie Peters	8,500 / 8,500	$525,721
October 18	Inglewood	United States	Kia Forum	Maisie Peters	—	—
October 20	Phoenix	United States	Arizona Financial Theatre	Maisie Peters	—	—
October 23	Sugar Land	United States	Smart Financial Centre	Maisie Peters	—	—
October 25	Austin	United States	Moody Center	Maisie Peters	6,030 / 6,030	$413,730
October 26	Fort Worth	United States	Dickies Arena	Maisie Peters	—	—
November 2	Amsterdam	Netherlands	AFAS Live	Between Friends	—	—
November 3	Amsterdam	Netherlands	AFAS Live	Between Friends	—	—
November 4	Brussels	Belgium	Forest National	Between Friends	—	—
November 5	Paris	France	Zénith Paris	Between Friends	—	—
November 7	Manchester	England	O_{2} Apollo Manchester	Between Friends	—	—
November 8	Manchester	England	O_{2} Apollo Manchester	Between Friends	—	—
November 10	London	England	OVO Arena Wembley	Between Friends	10,932 / 10,932	$700,878
Total					25,462	$1,640,329

== Cancelled dates ==
List of concerts
Date (2024)	City	Country	Venue
August 25	Quezon City	Philippines	Araneta Coliseum
August 30	Taipei	Taiwan	Nangang International Exhibition Center
September 10	Osaka	Japan	Zepp Namba

== Notes ==
Show details
