= Good Neighbour =

(The) Good Neighbour or (The) Good Neighbor may refer to:

== Film and theatre ==
- Good Neighbor (1941 Broadway production), at the Windsor Theatre, New York City
- Good Neighbor (2001 film), a 2001 American film
- The Good Neighbour (film), 2011 German film directed by Stephan Rick, originally titled Unter Nachbarn
- The Good Neighbor (2016 film), an American film
- Good Neighbor (2020 film), a 2020 South Korean film
- The Good Neighbor (2022 film), an American remake of the 2011 German film

== Other ==
- The Good Neighbour (newspaper)
- A slogan for WCCO (AM), a radio station located in Minneapolis, Minnesota, USA

== See also ==
- Good Neighbours (disambiguation)
- Good Neighbor policy (disambiguation)
