= Just Friends (disambiguation) =

Just Friends is a 2005 romantic comedy film starring Ryan Reynolds and Amy Smart.

Just Friends may also refer to:

== Film and television ==
- Just Friends (1993 film), a Belgian-Dutch film directed by Marc-Henri Wajnberg
- Just Friends, a 1996 romantic comedy directed by Maria Burton
- Just Friends? (2009 film), a South Korean short film directed by Kim Jho Kwang-soo
- Just Friends (2018 film), a Dutch film directed by Ellen Smit
- Just Friends (TV series), a 1979 American sitcom
- "Just Friends" (Degrassi High), a 1989 TV episode
- "Just Friends" (Life with Derek), a 2008 TV episode

== Literature ==
- Just Friends, a 2026 romance novel by Haley Pham

== Music ==
=== Artists ===
- Just Friends (band), an American funk rock band

=== Albums ===
- Just Friends (Buddy Tate, Nat Simkins and Houston Person album), 1992
- Just Friends (Joe Temperley and Jimmy Knepper album), 1978
- Just Friends (Rick Haydon and John Pizzarelli album), 2006
- Just Friends (Zoot Sims and Harry Edison album), 1980
- Just Friends (soundtrack), from the 2005 film
- Just Friends, by Helen Merrill, 1989
- Just Friends, by Oliver Jones, 1989
- Just Friends, a Riddim Driven compilation, 2002

=== Songs ===
- "Just Friends" (Danny! song), 2009
- "Just Friends" (Hayden James song), 2018
- "Just Friends" (John Klenner and Sam M. Lewis song), 1931
- "Just Friends (Sunny)", by Musiq Soulchild, 1999
- "Just Friends", by Amy Winehouse from Back to Black, 2006
- "Just Friends", by G-Eazy, 2017
- "Just Friends", by Gavin DeGraw from Chariot, 2003
- "Just Friends", by the Jonas Brothers from Jonas Brothers, 2007
- "Just Friends", by Nine Black Alps from Everything Is, 2005
- "Just Friends", by Olivia O'Brien from Was It Even Real?, 2019
- "Just Friends", by Vanessa Williams from The Real Thing, 2009
- "Just Friends", by Virginia to Vegas, 2019
- "Just Friends", by Why Don't We, 2022

== See also ==
- Just Between Friends (disambiguation)
- Just Good Friends (disambiguation)
- Friend zone, a platonic relationship in which only one partner wants a romantic relationship
- Friends (disambiguation)
- Friendship, a form of interpersonal relationship
