= Between Friends =

Between Friends may refer to:

== Film and television ==
- Between Friends (1924 film), an American film starring Norman Kerry
- Between Friends (1973 film), a Canadian film directed by Donald Shebib
- Between Friends (1983 film), an American-Canadian TV film starring Elizabeth Taylor
- "Between Friends" (Animorphs), a 1998 television episode
- "Between Friends" (Hangin' with Mr. Cooper), a 1994 television episode

== Music ==
- Between Friends (Randy Napoleon album), 2006
- Between Friends (Tamia album), 2006
- "Between Friends", a song by Captain Murphy from Duality
- Between Friends (music group), an American music group

== Other uses ==
- Between Friends, a 2012 collection of stories by Amos Oz
- Between Friends (comics), a syndicated comic strip by Sandra Bell-Lundy

== See also ==
- Just Between Friends (disambiguation)
