= Jigsaw (Conan Gray song) =

Single by Conan Gray

from the album Superache
- Released: January 21, 2022
- Genre: Rock, Pop rock, Pop punk, Alternative rock, emo pop
- Length: 3:38
- Label: Republic Records
- Songwriters: Conan Gray, Dan Nigro
- Producer: Dan Nigro

Conan Gray singles chronology
"Telepath" (2022)	"Jigsaw" (2022)	"Memories" (2022)

Music video
- "Jigsaw" Lyric video on YouTube

"Jigsaw" is a song by singer-songwriter Conan Gray, featured as the third single and track 7 of his second album, Superache. It was released through Republic Records on January 21, 2022. The track was written by Gray along with Dan Nigro, who was then responsible for the production of the song and multiple other tracks on the record.

== Background ==
Conan released four previous singles in the previous year, 2021: "Overdrive", "Astronomy", "People Watching", and "Telepath". On Gray's birthday, December 5, 2021, he posted the first known snippet of "Jigsaw" on his private TikTok account, about a month prior of its original release. On January 16, 2022, he posted a second snippet of the song on his social media, giving fans a new look to what the song will bring. Finally, three days before its release on January 18, Conan finally announces "Jigsaw" as a single set to come out January 21. The track was included in the setlist for Gray's tour "The Conan Gray World Tour 2022" starting on March 1 of the same year.

Gray went on an interview with DIY Magazine to talk about the track, in which he said "I wrote jigsaw originally as a bit of a diary entry rant for myself. I'd spent my entire life contorting myself and changing everything I used to be in order to make everybody happy. I was so used to trying to please everyone that, when it came to love, I started to do the same.... By the end of it all it I ended up looking in the mirror and barely recognizing my rearranged and twisted reflection. I hope that jigsaw is a bit of a warning to people. That destroying yourself to win somebody's love will only leave you empty on the other side... Instead, choose to become somebody that you love."

== Critical reception ==
Music journalist Thomas Bleach (of BLEACHED: The Podcast) wrote that the track is "heartbreaking, honest and relatable." He also commented on the production, which contrasts from Gray's previous production styles.

Rachel Hirsch from Rock & Blog said that she "was impressed and inspired by these lyrics from an artist at such a young age", being such painful and emotional lyrics. American blog Ones to Watch compares the track's meaning to Gray's previous works, specifically to his 2020 song "Heather", saying they share "the desire of wanting to be someone else in order to be with someone else".

The Beacon reported on reactions by a number of students to the song, who used descriptors such as "somber", "grim", and "emotionally intense".

== Lyric video ==
A hand-drawn lyric video was released along with the video, with paper notes with the lyrics to the track. There seem to be puzzle pieces scattered around, as well as a pair of scissors, which are also featured on the art cover for the song.

This song appears to be the only single for the record to not feature a music video.
