= Good Friends =

Good Friends may refer to:

== Music ==
- Good Friends (Adam Brand album), 2000 album by Adam Brand
- "Good Friends" (Jake Shears song), 2018 song by Jake Shears
- Good Friends (Livingston Taylor album), 1993 album by Livingston Taylor

== Other uses ==
- "Good Friends" (book), 1994 short story from the Goosebump book series
- Good Friends (militant group), Pakistan

== See also ==
- Friendship
- Good Neighbours (disambiguation)
- Just Good Friends (disambiguation)
