= Good Neighbor policy (disambiguation) =

Good Neighbor Policy or Good Neighbour Policy may refer to:

- Good Neighbor policy, an American foreign policy
- Good Neighbour Policy (horse racing), an agreement amongst horse racing jurisdictions
- Good Neighbor policy (LDS Church), reforms adopted by The Church of Jesus Christ of Latter-day Saints
- The Good Neighbor Plan is a US EPA scheme for NO_{x} emissions reductions under the National Ambient Air Quality Standards
