= Between Friends (duo) =

Musical Duo

- Genres: Alternative pop, electronic, bedroom pop, indie
- Years active: 2017-present
- Website: itsbetweenfriends.com

Between Friends is an American musical group composed of siblings Brandon and Savannah Hudson. In 2013, they were quarterfinalists on Season 8 of America's Got Talent. The duo continued to pursue music, forming Between Friends in 2017, and released their first EP in 2018. As of August 2025, they have over 2,000,000 monthly listeners on Spotify.

== Biography ==
The duo were born in Miami, Florida, and grew up in Laurel Canyon, Los Angeles. They displayed an early interest and aptitude for music, and were homeschooled.

In 2013, they auditioned for Season 8 of America's Got Talent, and progressed until being eliminated in the quarterfinals. Two years later, they started the musical group The Heirs. The Heirs played in the 2016 Vans Warped Tour, but disbanded in 2017; the Hudson siblings, along with the drummer of The Heirs, split off to create Between Friends that same year. They are especially known for their 2018 hit single "affection," which has more than 210 million streams on Spotify as of February 2025. Their style has been self-described as "laptop-dream pop."

In March 2024 it was announced that Between Friends would support Conan Gray on the Europe leg of his tour Found Heaven On Tour. Alongside this, the group scheduled two headline shows in Berlin for October 2024.

Their latest album "WOW!" was announced in early June 2025, along with their headlining tour, spanning North America and Europe. They supported Olivia Rodrigo during her headlining show at the BST Hyde Park festival.

== Discography ==
=== Albums ===
- 2023 - I Love My Girl, She’s My Boy
- 2025 - WOW!

=== Mixtapes ===
- 2021 - i like when you shine!

=== EPs ===
- 2018 - we just need some time together
- 2021 - tape 001
- 2021 - tape 002
- 2021 - tape 003
- 2022 - CUTiE
- 2024 - Friends
- 2024 - garage sale
