= Good Neighbour Council =

Australian Commonwealth Government Program

The Good Neighbour Council was an Australian Commonwealth Government program launched in 1950 to win public acceptance of mass immigration to Australia of post-Second World War refugees and settlers by promoting rapid assimilation. State Good Neighbour Councils (GNCs) were formed to activate, encourage and co-ordinate the efforts of local church and community organisations in this role.

== History ==
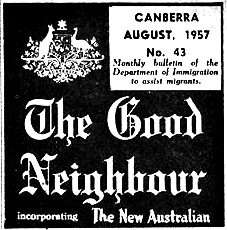
The Good Neighbour bulletin was distributed by various Good Neighbour Councils.

At a public meeting in July 1949, the South Australian Council of Social Service formed the Good Neighbour Council to assist newly arrived European migrants. The South Australian Good Neighbour Council coordinated the volunteer networks of ‘good neighbours’ as they spread across suburbs and country towns, linking them with other service organisations and the media. In January 1950 the movement became national, and the Good Neighbour Council was formally launched at the first Commonwealth Citizenship Convention in January, 1950. From their inauguration, the Councils influenced the Australian community towards a wider acceptance of the immigration programme and enlisted the community's support in the work of the integration of new settlers.

There were Good Neighbour Councils in each State and Territory which successfully enlisted the active support and co-operation of some 960 community agencies and thousands of Good Neighbour volunteers to assist in migrant integration. The Council itself became a focal point for the training of volunteers and for information and direct assistance to migrants, holding seminars on the recognition of qualifications and welfare entitlements. The Council held art exhibitions and other events to celebrate ethnic origins and talents and prepared publications for settlers and volunteers.

In 1950, Australian Government sponsorship of the Councils amounted to $16,000 with a staff of three, expenditure increasing in 1972 to $620,000 with a staff of 70. As well as head offices in each capital city, there were ten regional offices and five sub-offices established to bring the services available through the Good Neighbour Councils to areas of high migrant population. These offices were supported in their work by 2,187 branch members and 550 representatives of the Councils.

The Council saw itself as distinctively Australian, stubbornly resisting meaningful migrant participation. Migrant groups and academics criticised this narrow assimilationist approach and alleged that the English-speaking staff failed to reach beyond British migrants.

As the concept of multiculturalism replaced those of assimilation and integration, ethnic groups sought direct funding and on the recommendations of the Galbally report the Councils were abolished in 1978, though branches still continue in some states such as the Good Neighbour Council Launceston Inc.

== See also ==
- The Good Neighbour (newspaper)
- Post-war immigration to Australia
