= Good Neighbours =

Good Neighbours or Good Neighbors may refer to

- Good Neighbors (TV series) (1975), a British television series, also called The Good Life
- "Good Neighbors" (SpongeBob episode), a 2005 episode of the American animated series SpongeBob SquarePants
- Good Neighbours (film) (2010), a Canadian black comedy-drama/thriller film
- Good Neighbors (organization), an international humanitarian organization based in South Korea
- Good Neighbours (duo), a British musical duo best known for their 2024 song "Home"

== See also ==
- The Good Neighbour (disambiguation)
- Good Friends (disambiguation)
