= The Exit (Conan Gray song) =

Song by Conan Gray

from the album Superache
- Released: June 22, 2022
- Genre: Pop rock
- Length: 3:36
- Label: Republic
- Songwriters: Conan Gray, Dan Nigro, Julia Michaels
- Producer: Dan Nigro

Music video
- "The Exit" Lyric Video on YouTube

"The Exit" is a song by American singer-songwriter Conan Gray, serving as the 12th and closing track of his second album, Superache. It was released along with the album on 22 June 2022 by Republic Records. It was written by Gray, Dan Nigro, and Julia Michaels, with production handled by Nigro.

== Background ==
"The Exit" was released along the record it belongs to on 22 June 2022. The song is described as Conan being in love with somebody who's love has already moved on. Gray is still at the beginning of the album, in "Movies", mourning them, while this person has already healed and moved on away from him. "The Exit" was written in the last 30 minutes of a session between Conan and Michaels, along with "Telepath" and "Disaster." Gray is an expert at writing heartbreaking and vulnerable songs just like "The Exit", this is represented in previous works such as "People Watching", where he writes about yearning for love.

== Critical reception ==
Eva LeBeau calls "The Exit" the "perfect closing track" for such album as Superache, since in her words "allows the listener to feel every bit of lament that Conan Gray felt, himself, and it ties all of the tracks together amazingly." Tatum Van Dam agrees, since they call the song a "culmination of his growth since Sunset Season" and he also shares that he is "proud to be a fan of what he's accomplished and yet to accomplish." The song is really loved by the community and Gray's fandom.

== Certifications ==
Region	Certification	Certified Units/Sales
Australia (ARIA)	Gold	400,000^{‡}
United States (RIAA)	Gold	400,000^{‡}
