= Memories (Conan Gray song) =

Single by Conan Gray

from the album Superache
- Released: April 15, 2022
- Genre: Ballad, pop
- Length: 4:08
- Label: Republic Records
- Songwriters: Conan Gray, Dan Nigro
- Producer: Dan Nigro

Conan Gray singles chronology
"Jigsaw" (2022)	"Memories" (2022)	"Yours" (2022)

Music video
- Music video on YouTube

"Memories" is a song by American singer-songwriter Conan Gray, part of his second studio album Superache (2022). The song written entirely by Gray and his producer, Dan Nigro, who's also responsible for the production of the track. Released on April 15, 2022, it is the fourth pre-release single for the record, along with "Astronomy", "People Watching", "Jigsaw", "Yours" and "Disaster". With a music video and lyric video, it is the 11th track on the official track list.

== Background and release ==
After the breakthrough of his debut album, Kid Krow, and a good amount of songs in the record, Gray released singles "Overdrive" and "Astronomy" in 2021, not really much planning on creating an album. Regardless, Gray was writing and writing all throughout the Quarantine, until he came to what the record is today. "Memories" was written in the span of 10 minutes. Conan speaks that he sat down on his piano and started playing, when he was done, he knew he had finished the album, making "Memories" the last song to ever be written for the record. "Memories" has been described as one of Gray's favorite songs to perform live.

Conan is widely known for being close friends with American singer-songwriter Olivia Rodrigo. When Gray played "Memories" for Olivia, her appreciation for the track wasn't noticeable. Similarly, Rodrigo did the same towards Conan with the lead single of her second studio album Guts, "Vampire" where Gray said the song wasn't the best option for a lead single. Despite their negative opinions on each other's tracks, both tracks performed well, and are now certified and have reached the charts in multiple countries.

== Composition ==
"Memories" is 4:08 minutes long, making it the longest track on the record. Written entirely by Gray and Nigro, whom latter produced and composed the song himself.

== Critical reception ==
A music critic from UPenn calls the song " beautiful breakup anthem for people with ex’s that they are still friends with, or maybe even not friends with." Along, swixxz blogs expresses that what makes the song so good is how relatable it is. The critic also mentions that the track "captures the familiar feeling of trying to move on while being haunted by someone's lingering presence." Finally, Megan Muraya from Bummer Brews says that Conan still hasn't failed at his attempts to "wow listeners with songs illustrating relatable life experiences that come with growing up."

== Charts ==
Chart (2026)	Peak position
US Bubbling Under Hot 100	14
New Zealand (Aotearoa Music Charts)	6

== Certifications ==
Region	Certification	Certified Units/Sales
United States (RIAA)	Platinum	1,000,000^{‡}
Australia (ARIA)	Platinum	1,000,000^{‡}
Canada (MC)	Platinum	1,000,000^{‡}
New Zealand (RMNZ)	Gold	400,000^{‡}
United Kingdom (BPI)	Silver	400,000^{‡}
