= Good Neighbour Policy (horse racing) =

The Good Neighbour Policy is an agreement among horse racing bodies that no signatory shall provide betting on horse racing to residents of another signatory's jurisdiction without its permission, nor solicit, market nor advertise betting without prior authorisation from that other signatory.

The signatories to the agreement stated that its purpose was to show their unity in cracking down on illegal, unlicensed or unauthorised offshore bookmakers on horse racing, in order to protect the revenue of the signatories.

It is viewed by some as documenting an international cartel to defend the signatories from competition from commercial bookmakers and bet exchanges so as to maintain higher profits for themselves.

== History ==
The Policy was initially signed by the Hong Kong Jockey Club and the Japan Racing Association in 2002. On September 1, 2003, representatives from the Australian Racing Board, the Hong Kong Jockey Club, the Turf Authorities of India, the Japan Racing Association, the Korea Racing Association, New Zealand Thoroughbred Racing, the Singapore Turf Club and the Jockey Club of Turkey signed the multilateral agreement in Hong Kong on September 1, 2003. The Asian Racing Federation also endorsed the agreement.
