= Draw My Life =

Type of internet video

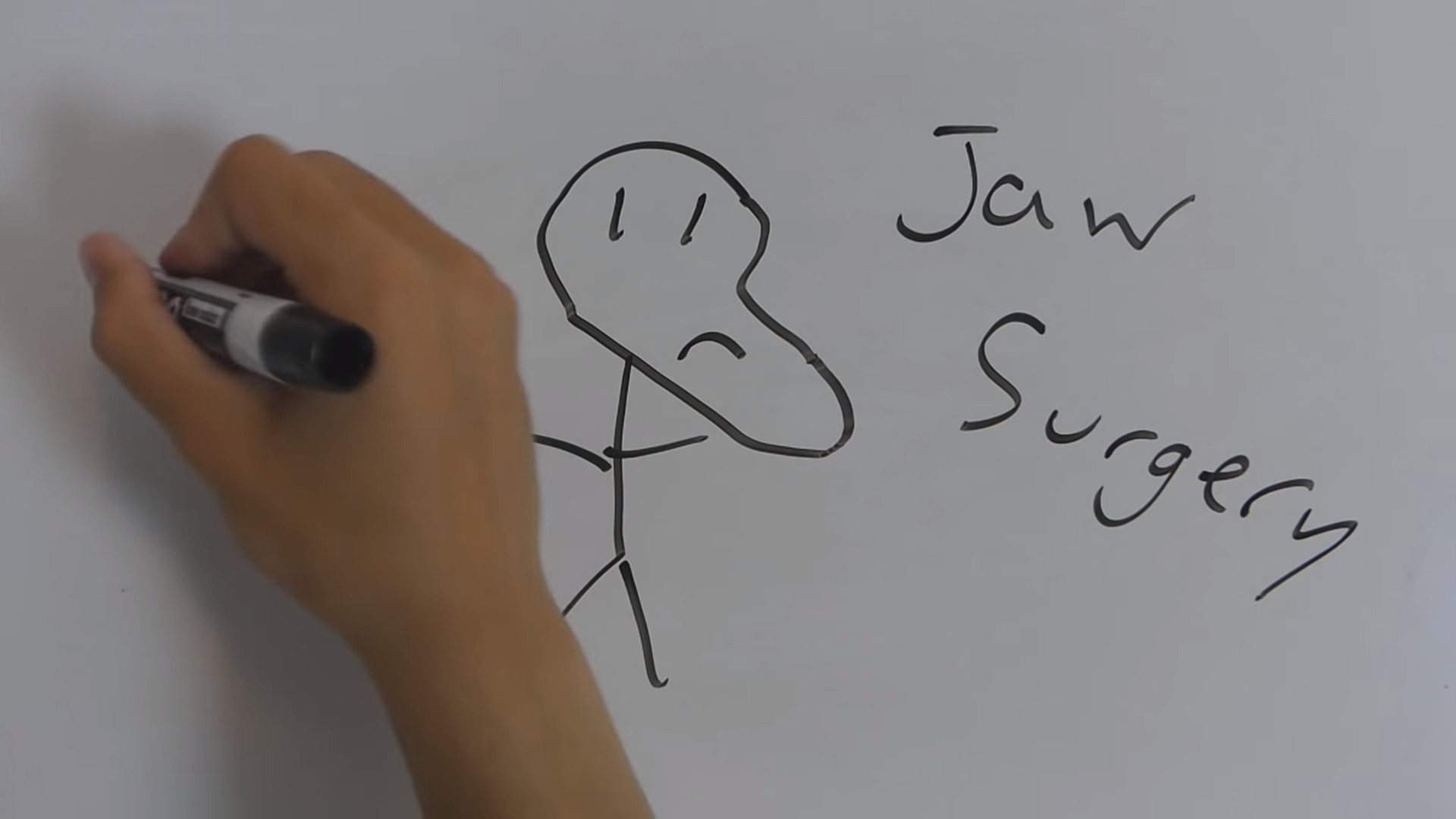
Frame from a Draw My Life video

Draw My Life is an internet video genre in which the author narrates their life history, in the form of a fast-motion video of the author drawing illustrations, usually on a whiteboard, of key figures and events in their life. Drawings can be as simple as stick figures, or fully fleshed-out, created digitally or digitised. The videos often reveal previously hidden upsetting or unfortunate histories or stories, and often end in the author thanking their audience for aiding their success.

The first video of its kind was posted to YouTube by Irish YouTuber and musician Bry in September 2011. This style of video became a popular trend on YouTube in 2013, when several other YouTube personalities began uploading such videos, some of which were featured in popular online news publications. Draw My Life videos were subsequently created for fictional characters and non-YouTubers, such as Harry Potter.
