= Just Between Friends (disambiguation) =

Just Between Friends is a 1986 American drama film.

Just Between Friends may also refer to:

- Just Between Friends (album), a 2008 album by saxophonist Houston Person and bassist Ron Carter
- Just Between Friends (soundtrack), the original soundtrack to the 1986 film

== See also ==
- Between Friends (disambiguation)
- "Joust Between Friends", an episode of the American television show The Golden Girls
