= The Good Neighbour (newspaper) =

Australian newspaper to assist immigrants

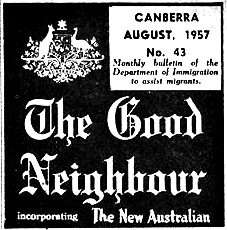
- Type: Monthly bulletin
- Format: Broadsheet 25.5cm x 37.5cm
- Editor: Australian Department of Immigration
- Founded: August 1950
- Language: English
- Headquarters: Canberra, Australia

The Good Neighbour was a monthly bulletin in newspaper broadsheet format issued by the News and Information Bureau, Australian Department of Immigration, to assist immigrants to Australia.

Printed on buff-coloured paper, it contained eight pages of illustrated news and advice for new immigrants to Australia. It was published from August 1950 (No. 1) to October 1969 (No. 189) and was distributed by the Good Neighbour Council. The Good Neighbour also incorporated The New Australian which appeared from January 1949 (No.1) to December 1953 (No. 60).

The National Library of Australia in Canberra holds a complete set of these papers, and digitized copies are available online.
