= Family Line (song) =

Song by Conan Gray

from the album Superache
- Released: June 24, 2022
- Genre: Folk-pop
- Length: 3:36
- Label: Republic Records
- Songwriters: Conan Gray, Dan Nigro
- Producer: Dan Nigro

Music video
- Conan Gray - "Family Line" (Official Lyric Video) on YouTube

"Family Line" is a song by American singer-songwriter Conan Gray. It is the eighth track on his second studio album Superache. Released through Republic Records, it was written by Gray and Dan Nigro, who produced and composed the majority of the album.

== Background ==
Gray began writing the song during the 2020 Quarantine of COVID-19, around the time his debut album Kid Krow was released. He stated that the Quarantine led him to think about his childhood, which inspired the majority of the songs and themes of the album. Conan wrote the first verse and chorus of the song in 2020, and then proceeded to ignore it for about a year and a half. He played a demo of the song to his best friend, Ashley Combs, and realized that he had to finish it since Combs reportedly "sobbed in the car" to the song. The song took 2 years to finalize. It took so long because he would "write one line then get scared and stop writing".

The lyrics of "Family Line" circle around Gray's childhood trauma, flowing from the abusive environment in which he grew up. It expresses elements of physical abuse, fear, and a grudge held against his father. In the track, he mentions trying to live a different life away from his family. He notices the similarities between himself and his family, but eventually realizes he embraces his past, realizing he can be whomever he wants.

== Critical reception ==
Carena Liptak from the Grammy's said the message of "Family Line" is clear, "In order to take control of your future, you have to come to terms with your past." They also call the song "the powerful fulcrum" of the record. Eva LaBeau from The Central Thread stated "I can't even begin to express my emotion for this song, but I can positively say that it's one of the most hard-hitting on the album."

== Certifications ==
Region	Certification	Certified Units/Sales
Australia (ARIA)	Platinum	1,000,000^{‡}
Canada (MC)	Platinum	1,000,000^{‡}
New Zealand (RMNZ)	Gold	400,000^{‡}
United Kingdom (BPI)	Silver	400,000^{‡}
