= Superache =

Studio album by Conan Gray
- Released: June 24, 2022
- Recorded: 2021–2022
- Studios: Amusement Studios (Los Angeles, California); Cirkut City (Los Angeles, California)
- Genre: Pop
- Length: 40:22
- Label: Republic
- Producers: Dan Nigro; Cirkut

Conan Gray chronology
Kid Krow (2020)	Superache (2022)	Found Heaven (2024)

Singles from Superache
- 1. "Astronomy" Released: May 7, 2021; 2. "People Watching" Released: July 15, 2021; 3. "Jigsaw" Released: January 21, 2022; 4. "Memories" Released: April 15, 2022; 5. "Yours" Released: May 19, 2022; 6. "Disaster" Released: June 24, 2022

Superache is the second studio album by American singer and songwriter Conan Gray, released on June 24, 2022, through Republic Records. It is a follow-up to Gray's debut album Kid Krow (2020). Described by Gray as an expansion of his yearning heartbreak, the album touches on themes such as childhood trauma, abuse, friendship, and love, as of his experiences growing up.

Superache was preceded by the singles "Astronomy", "People Watching", "Jigsaw", "Memories", and "Yours", while standalone singles "Overdrive" and "Telepath" were included as bonus tracks on the Japanese edition. The record has been described as a pop album, that contain elements of dance-pop, synth-pop, and indie pop. The album was met with critical acclaim, with critics praising Gray's vocal performance, production, honest lyricism and different style compared to its predecessor. The album debuted at number nine on the US Billboard 200, with 43,000 album-equivalent units and spent twelve weeks on the chart.

== Background ==
Gray told Tomas Mier of Rolling Stone that this album was designed to be centered around the song "Family Line" which was inspired by "childhood trauma and generational trauma [and his] rough upbringing", and the song "Best Friend" about his childhood best friend Ashley.

== Critical reception ==
Professional ratings
Aggregate scores
Source	Rating
Metacritic	81/100
Review scores
Source	Rating
AllMusic	4/5 stars
Clash	9/10
NME	4/5 stars
Rolling Stone	3.5/5 stars

Superache was met with critical acclaim from music critics after its release. On Metacritic, which assigns a normalized score out of 100 to ratings from publications, the album received a score of 81 based on 4 reviews, indicating "universal acclaim".

Georgia Evans of NME gave the album four out of five stars, and wrote "it may be theatrical, but 'Superache' still feels deep and honest. Cut through the crescendoes and you'll find real tenderness. 'I'll just take a footnote in your life / And you could take my body / Every line I would write for you,' he sings on 'Footnote', inspired by Pride and Prejudice and the realisation that unrequited love doesn't match up to fictional romance. That's OK, though: Gray knows this kind of all-encompassing love is painful – and he's ready to feel it at full force." Gem Stokes of Clash wrote "'Superache' is a definitive evolution for Gray. A matured turn since his debut 'Kid Krow', 'Superache' continues to exemplify Gray's flair for pop bops, but with ripened introspection". Matt Collar of AllMusic wrote "Superache is a bigger, more robust record than 2020's Kid Krow, while still retaining, and in many ways expanding upon, the heartfelt diaristic qualities that made Gray such a poster child for sad Internet teens". Maura Johnston of Rolling Stone wrote "On his second album, the 23-year-old YouTuber turned pop star reveals himself to be an astute observer of the human condition, recounting everyday scenes and highlighting those split-second details in interactions that can make a warm rapport between two people transform into permafrost".

== Commercial performance ==
Superache debuted at number nine on the US Billboard 200, with 43,000 album-equivalent units. It marked Gray's second consecutive entry in the top ten of the chart, following his first album, Kid Krow.

== Track listing ==
All tracks are written by Conan Gray and Dan Nigro, except where noted. All tracks are produced by Dan Nigro, except where noted.

Superache track listing
No.	Title	Writer(s)	Producer(s)	Length
1.	"Movies"			3:34
2.	"People Watching"	Gray; Nigro; Julia Michaels		2:38
3.	"Disaster"	Gray; Henry Walter; Michaels	Cirkut	2:33
4.	"Best Friend"			2:28
5.	"Astronomy"			4:03
6.	"Yours"			3:24
7.	"Jigsaw"			3:28
8.	"Family Line"			3:36
9.	"Summer Child"	Gray		3:00
10.	"Footnote"			3:44
11.	"Memories"			4:08
12.	"The Exit"	Gray; Nigro; Michaels	Nigro; Ryan Linvill^{[a]}	3:41
Total length:				40:17

Japanese CD bonus tracks
No.	Title	Writer(s)	Producer(s)	Length
13.	"Overdrive"	Gray; Oliver Peterhof; Chris Stracey; The Monsters & Strangerz; Tobias Jesso Jr.	Peterhof; Stracey; The Monsters & Strangerz; Jesso	3:03
14.	"Telepath"	Gray; Michaels; Ilya Salmanzadeh; Caroline Ailin	Ilya	3:14
Total length:				46:40

Notes

- ^{^[a]} indicates an additional producer

== Personnel ==
Musicians

- Conan Gray – lead and background vocals (all tracks), baritone vocals (track 3), acoustic guitar (9)
- Dan Nigro – acoustic guitar (1, 4, 5, 8–12), background vocals (1, 2, 4–12), bass (1, 2, 4, 6–8, 10, 12), drum programming (1, 2, 4, 6, 8, 10–12), electric guitar (1, 2, 5, 7, 8, 10, 12), piano (1, 2, 4–6, 8, 12), synthesizer programming (1, 6, 8, 10), percussion (2, 12), synthesizer (2), organ (6, 11), drums (7, 11), programming (7)
- Julia Michaels – background vocals (2)
- Sterling Laws – drums (2, 6)
- Ryan Linvill – programming (2, 5), bass (5, 8, 10–12), saxophone (6, 12), drum programming (8, 10), synthesizer programming (8, 12), electric guitar (11)
- Cirkut – drum programming, keyboards, synthesizer programming (3)
- Ben Romans – piano (11)
- Paul Cartwright – viola, violin (12)

Technical

- Randy Merrill – mastering
- Serban Ghenea – mixing (1–3, 11)
- Mitch McCarthy – mixing (4, 6–10, 12)
- Daniel Nigro – mixing (5), engineering (1, 2, 4–12)
- Ryan Linvill – engineering (1, 2, 4–12)
- Cirkut – engineering (3)

Artwork

- Conan Gray – creative direction, art direction, design
- Ryan Rogers – art direction
- Connor Dewhurst – design
- Brian Ziff – photography

== Charts ==
Chart performance
Chart (2022)	Peak position
Australian Albums (ARIA)	8
Austrian Albums (Ö3 Austria)	14
Belgian Albums (Ultratop Flanders)	14
Belgian Albums (Ultratop Wallonia)	124
Canadian Albums (Billboard)	24
Dutch Albums (Album Top 100)	9
Finnish Albums (Suomen virallinen lista)	43
French Albums (SNEP)	150
German Albums (Offizielle Top 100)	13
Irish Albums (Official Charts)	8
Lithuanian Albums (AGATA)	21
New Zealand Albums (RMNZ)	11
Norwegian Albums (VG-lista)	38
Polish Albums (ZPAV)	21
Scottish Albums (Official Charts)	4
Spanish Albums (Promusicae)	13
Swiss Albums (Schweizer Hitparade)	20
UK Albums (Official Charts)	8
US Billboard 200	9

== Certifications ==
Certifications
Region	Certification	Certified units/sales
Australia (ARIA)	Gold	35,000^{‡}
Canada (Music Canada)	Platinum	80,000^{‡}
New Zealand (RMNZ)	Gold	7,500^{‡}
Poland (ZPAV)	Gold	10,000^{‡}
United Kingdom (BPI)	Gold	100,000^{‡}
^{‡} Sales+streaming figures based on certification alone.

== Release history ==
Release history and formats
Region	Date	Format	Edition	Label	Ref.
Various	June 24, 2022	Digital download; streaming	Standard	Republic	
Australia	June 24, 2022	CD	Standard	Republic	
Canada	June 24, 2022	CD	Standard	Republic	
United Kingdom	June 24, 2022	CD	Standard	Republic	
United States	June 24, 2022	CD	Standard	Republic	
United States	June 24, 2022	CD	Target exclusive	Republic	
Japan	June 24, 2022	CD	Bonus tracks	Republic	
Canada	June 24, 2022	LP	Standard	Republic	
United Kingdom	June 24, 2022	LP	Standard	Republic	
United States	June 24, 2022	LP	Standard	Republic	
United States	June 24, 2022	LP	Target exclusive	Republic	
United States	June 24, 2022	LP	Urban Outfitters exclusive	Republic	
United States	June 24, 2022	Cassette tape	Standard	Republic	
