= People Watching (Conan Gray song) =

Single by Conan Gray

from the album Superache
- Released: July 15, 2021
- Genre: Indie pop
- Length: 2:38
- Label: Republic
- Songwriters: Dan Nigro; Julia Michaels; Conan Gray
- Producer: Dan Nigro

Conan Gray singles chronology
"Astronomy" (2021)	"People Watching" (2021)	"Telepath" (2021)

Music video
- Music video on YouTube

"People Watching" is a song by American singer-songwriter Conan Gray from his second studio album Superache (2022). The song was written by Gray, Julia Michaels, and Dan Nigro, the latter of whom also produced the song. It was released by Republic Records on July 15, 2021. Inspired by Gray's personal experiences during college, it is an indie pop song that is about the activity of people-watching.

The song received positive reviews from critics, who praised the sentimental aspect of the lyrics. "People Watching" placed on record charts in New Zealand and Singapore, and was certified platinum in Canada, and gold in Australia, Brazil, and New Zealand. A music video featuring Gray working in a café was released on the day after the single. In 2022, Gray performed the song on The Today Show.

== Background and release ==
In 2017, Gray posted a tweet on Twitter stating "i love people watching so much". He later released his debut album, Kid Krow, in 2020 on which he also collaborated with Dan Nigro. The following year Gray released two singles: "Overdrive" and "Astronomy". Gray began teasing a third single, later revealed to be "People Watching", which was released by Republic Records on July 15, 2021. The song was featured as the second track on Gray's second studio album Superache in 2022. "Astronomy" was also released on the album while "Overdrive", and Gray's following single, "Telepath", were featured as bonus tracks on Superache's Japanese CD release.

== Composition and lyrics ==
"People Watching"
A brief sample of the chorus from "People Watching" which highlights the jealousy experienced by Gray while he is people-watching but longing for a romantic relationship that he has seen others experience.

"People Watching" is an indie pop up-tempo ballad that explores the activity of people-watching. For the song, Gray collaborated with Julia Michaels and his producer Dan Nigro; the three share a writing credit on the single. Gray said he obtained the idea for the lyrics from eavesdropping on couples and wanting to share true romantic feelings with someone. He also explained that he had never dated anyone prior to writing the song, which is representative through lyrics in the chorus which states, "I wanna feel all that love and emotion; be that attached to the person I'm holding".

The overall concept of the song expands on Gray's view of romantic relationships which he previously explored in "Crush Culture" from his 2018 extended play, Sunset Season. "People Watching" opens with a steady guitar; the song slowly builds cumulating in a swell at the chorus. The bridge features steadily increasing bass, piano, and drums over the lyrics "Cut people out like tags on my clothing", followed by Gray describing life as being monotone.

== Reception ==
Robin Murray with Clash said the song "balances a longing for love with an awareness of loneliness" and noted Gray's ability to write from the perspective of an outsider. Ones to Watch writer Maxamillion Polo mentions the "emotional depth" that Gray harnesses in the track by highlighting the significance behind the lyrics. Uproxx's Caitlin White described the song as "vulnerable" and mentioned how the song is told from a position where the subject is safe from relationship turmoil but at the same time, lacks intimacy. Sofie Hernandez from NPR Music stated that Gray "has an acute ability to pick up on the intimate intricacies of love" and wrote that the song romanticizes relationships. Writing for Affinity Magazine, Helen Ehrlich opined that Gray used the song to separate himself from the emotional baggage of his previous works.

"People Watching" placed number 22 on the New Zealand Hot Singles Chart and number 25 on the Singaporean chart. It was certified platinum in Canada, gold in Australia, Brazil, and New Zealand, and silver in the United Kingdom.

== Music video and promotion ==
A music video for the song, directed by Joe Mischo, was shared on the day after its release. In the video, Gray is featured working in a café and jealously observes various couples drinking coffee and eating pastries. In the process of people-watching, he falls behind in performing his job duties causing a croissant to catch fire and allowing a coffee mug to fall to the ground and break. As the other employees deal with mishap, the café fills with smoke while Gray appears unfazed and continues to people-watch. Gray attributed the concept of the video to his time in college when he would regularly people-watch in a similar café on campus. He also stated he would joke about being terrible at working in a café with his best friend Ashley who appeared in the video.

Gray performed "People Watching", along with "Disaster" and "Memories" from Superache and "Heather" from Kid Krow on The Today Show as part of their "Citi Concert Series". It was also performed on the Superache Tour. "People Watching" was featured along with "Crush Culture" in the Heartstopper season two episode, "Sorry". The song was also used on Gray's following tour for his third studio album, Found Heaven (2024), as well as the associated tour for Wishbone (2025), his fourth studio album.

== Credits and personnel ==
Adapted from Tidal.

- Conan Gray – composer, lyricist, associated performer, background vocalist, vocals
- Dan Nigro – producer, composer, lyricist, associated performer, background vocalist, bass, drum programming, percussion, piano, synthesizer
- Julia Michaels – composer, lyricist, associated performer, background vocalist
- Ryan Linvill – associated performer
- Sterling Laws – associated performer, drums
- Randy Merrill – mastering engineer, studio personnel
- Serban Ghenea – mixer, studio personnel

== Charts ==
Chart placements for "People Watching" by Conan Gray
Chart (2021)	Peak position
Singapore (RIAS)	25
New Zealand Hot Singles (RMNZ)	22
US Pop Airplay (Billboard)	32

== Certifications ==
Certifications for "People Watching" by Conan Gray
Region	Certification	Certified units/sales
Australia (ARIA)	Gold	35,000^{‡}
Brazil (Pro-Música Brasil)	Gold	20,000^{‡}
Canada (Music Canada)	Platinum	80,000^{‡}
New Zealand (RMNZ)	Platinum	30,000^{‡}
United Kingdom (BPI)	Silver	200,000^{‡}
^{‡} Sales+streaming figures based on certification alone.
