= Just Good Friends (disambiguation) =

Just Good Friends is a 1980s British sitcom which starred Paul Nicholas and Jan Francis

Just Good Friends may also refer to:

- "Just Good Friends" (song), a song by Michael Jackson, featuring Stevie Wonder, from Bad
- "Just Good Friends", a song by Rick Astley, the B-side of the single "Whenever You Need Somebody"
- "Just Good Friends (Close)", a song by Fish from Internal Exile
- "Just Good Friends", an episode of Miss Jones and Son
