= Conan Gray =

American singer-songwriter (born 1998)

- Gray in 2026

Background information
- Born: Conan Lee Gray; December 5, 1998 (age 27); Lemon Grove, California, U.S.
- Origin: Georgetown, Texas, U.S.
- Education: University of California, Los Angeles (no degree)
- Genre: Pop
- Occupations: Singer; songwriter
- Instruments: Vocals; guitar; piano
- Works: Discography; songs; performances
- Years active: 2011–present
- Label: Republic
- Website: conangray.com

YouTube information
- Channel: Conan Gray
- Genres: Music; vlogging
- Subscribers: 5.73 million
- Views: 1.994 billion
- Last updated: June 14, 2026

Conan Lee Gray (born December 5, 1998) is an American singer, songwriter and former YouTuber. He was born in Lemon Grove, California, and raised in Georgetown, Texas, where he began uploading vlogs, covers, and original songs to YouTube as a teenager. In 2018, Gray signed a record deal with Republic Records, which released his debut EP, Sunset Season (2018).

Bolstered by the commercially successful songs "Maniac" and "Heather", his studio album Kid Krow (2020), entered the U.S. Billboard 200 at number five, making it the biggest U.S. artist debut of that year. His second studio album, Superache (2022), debuted in the top ten in the chart, also doing so in the United Kingdom, Australia, Ireland, and the Netherlands. His third and fourth albums, Found Heaven (2024) and Wishbone (2025), peaked at numbers 14 and three on the Billboard 200, respectively.

== Early life ==
Gray was born on December 5, 1998, in Lemon Grove, California, a suburb of San Diego. His father is Irish and his mother is Japanese. As an infant, he moved with his family to Hiroshima, Japan, because his grandfather needed medical care after being diagnosed with cancer. After his grandfather's death, the family moved back to California.

Gray's parents divorced when he was three years old and he was thereafter raised by a single mother. In a "Draw My Life" video, he details his experiences with divorce as a young child. As his father was in the military, Gray moved nine times during his childhood, including two times during sixth grade. He was frequently bullied in grade school for being quiet.

Gray eventually settled as a preteen in Georgetown, Texas, where he remained for the rest of his teenage years. His life in central Texas inspired much of his art and music. He was accepted to UCLA, and moved to Los Angeles, California, in September 2017. However, he dropped out three months later to begin touring after he was signed to Republic Records.

== Career ==
=== 2013–2019: YouTube channel and Sunset Season ===
Gray created his official YouTube channel in 2013, and began making videos at age 15. His early videos were about topics such as baking and mainly focused on his everyday life. His vlog content centered heavily on his life in small-town Texas. He is often hailed for his appreciation of Americana-related nostalgia. Gray has recorded music, showed his art, and created other videos for his vlog with more than 25 million views.

Gray self-released his debut single, "Idle Town", in March 2017. The song gained over 14 million streams on Spotify and 12 million views on YouTube. He self-released his second single, "Grow", on September 1, 2017. In October 2018, he released the single "Generation Why" on Republic Records, which was called "a rallying call to millennials". In November 2018, he released the five-track EP Sunset Season, which includes the songs "Idle Town", "Generation Why", "Crush Culture", "Greek God", and "Lookalike". The EP peaked at No. 2 on the Billboard Heatseekers Albums chart. Gray embarked on the Sunset Shows tour in support of the EP. Sometime in 2018, he trademarked GirlyBoy, Inc., his way of owning his masters. He used it for his fourth album, Wishbone.

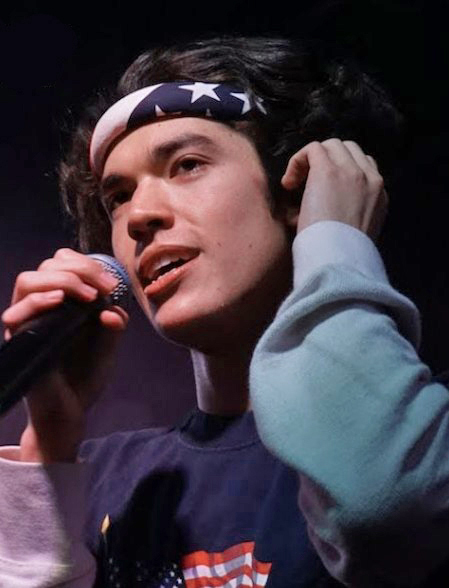
Gray in 2019

Gray made his late-night television debut on Late Night with Seth Meyers on the eve of February 2019, before performing several shows as an opening act on Panic! at the Disco's Pray for the Wicked Tour. He played concert festivals such as The Great Escape in addition to touring nationally. In February 2019, Gray re-released the single "The Other Side" after originally publishing it on YouTube in 2016 on the eve of the first day of his senior year of high school. Between March and October 2019, he released three singles from his debut album, Kid Krow, "Checkmate", "Comfort Crowd", and "Maniac", and an independent single, "The King". In October 2019, Gray embarked on the Comfort Crowd Tour, his second headlining tour of North America, with support from acclaimed New Zealand musician Benee as well as American recording artist UMI. As of October 2019, Gray's catalog had gained over 250 million streams across all platforms collectively. He received the 2019 Shorty Award for Best YouTube Musician, and was nominated for Breakthrough Artist at the 2019 Streamy Awards.

=== 2020–2021: Kid Krow ===
Throughout the second week of 2020, Gray shared daily hints about the title of his debut album on Twitter. On January 9, 2020, he revealed the title, Kid Krow, and wrote, "I say more on this album than I've ever said in my life, and I can't wait to tell you all of my secrets. Love y'all." Gray released "The Story" on the same day of the album's announcement, as well as "Wish You Were Sober" as a surprise release two days before the album's release. During early 2020, Gray's single "Maniac" became successful on international mainstream pop radio, specifically in Australia, where it was certified platinum. The song was also certified Platinum in Canada and Gold in the US, making it his first certified song in all three countries. It became his first appearance on Billboard. The single reached No. 25 on the Bubbling Under Hot 100 chart, as well as number one in Australia and the top 100 charts of Ireland and South Korea. Gray released Kid Krow on March 20, 2020, which debuted at No. 145 on the Billboard 200 as well as No. 141 on the US Pop Albums chart and No. 142 on the Top Album Sales chart with over 37 thousand pure sales. In the US, it was the biggest new artist debut of 2020 as of March and was the top pop solo debut album in over two years since Camila Cabello's 2018 self-titled album. The album was praised by publications such as Paper, Billboard, NPR, Teen Vogue and Paste.

Gray was scheduled to perform on The Tonight Show Starring Jimmy Fallon on March 16, as well as Coachella in mid April 2020, however both performances were cancelled due to the COVID-19 pandemic. In mid-2020, both Forbes and Billboard listed Gray as a frontrunner in their predictions for Best New Artist nominees at the 2021 Grammy Awards. Following the commercial success of Kid Krow, Apple Music named Gray as an Up Next artist and released an exclusive mini-documentary about him in April 2020. He would have embarked on the Kid Krow World Tour with support from Bülow in 2020, though it was also cancelled due to the pandemic. In August 2020, the song "Heather" became popular on the social media platform TikTok, consequently becoming Kid Krow's sixth and final single. It made Gray his first entry on the Billboard Hot 100 in his career, and further charted in the top 40 of countries such as the United Kingdom, Australia, New Zealand, and Ireland. It became his most commercially successful single since "Maniac", which achieved international mainstream hit radio success earlier that year. Gray performed "Heather" on both The Late Late Show with James Corden and The Today Show in October 2020. He released the single "Fake" with American singer Lauv in October 2020.

=== 2022–2024: Superache and Found Heaven ===
Between May 2021 and January 2022, Gray released the singles "Astronomy", "People Watching", "Telepath", and "Jigsaw". He began his 2022 world tour in March, later concluding in June. On April 11, 2022, Gray announced that his second album Superache would be released on June 24, 2022. On April 15, 2022, he released the song "Memories", and on May 19 he released the fifth single of the album, "Yours", and revealed the track list. The album is 12 tracks and a total of 40 minutes long. Previously released single "Telepath" was not featured on the track list and remained as a non-album single. It was released on June 24, 2022. Alongside the album, the video for the single "Disaster" was also released, as well as Gray's announcement of his fourth concert tour, the Superache Tour, which ran from September 2022 to March 2023. Speaking about the album, Gray said "Writing this album was miserable, and that's why it ended up being a super-accurate depiction of my life", and "It felt like scraping my ribs of any last bits of meat". In April 2022, he appeared as a surprise guest on Olivia Rodrigo's Sour Tour in Vancouver and they did a cover of the Katy Perry song, "The One That Got Away". On July 18, 2022, Gray sang the national anthem at the 2022 Major League Baseball Home Run Derby. His performance was widely criticized across social media, some comparing it to Fergie's performance at the 2018 NBA All-Star Game.

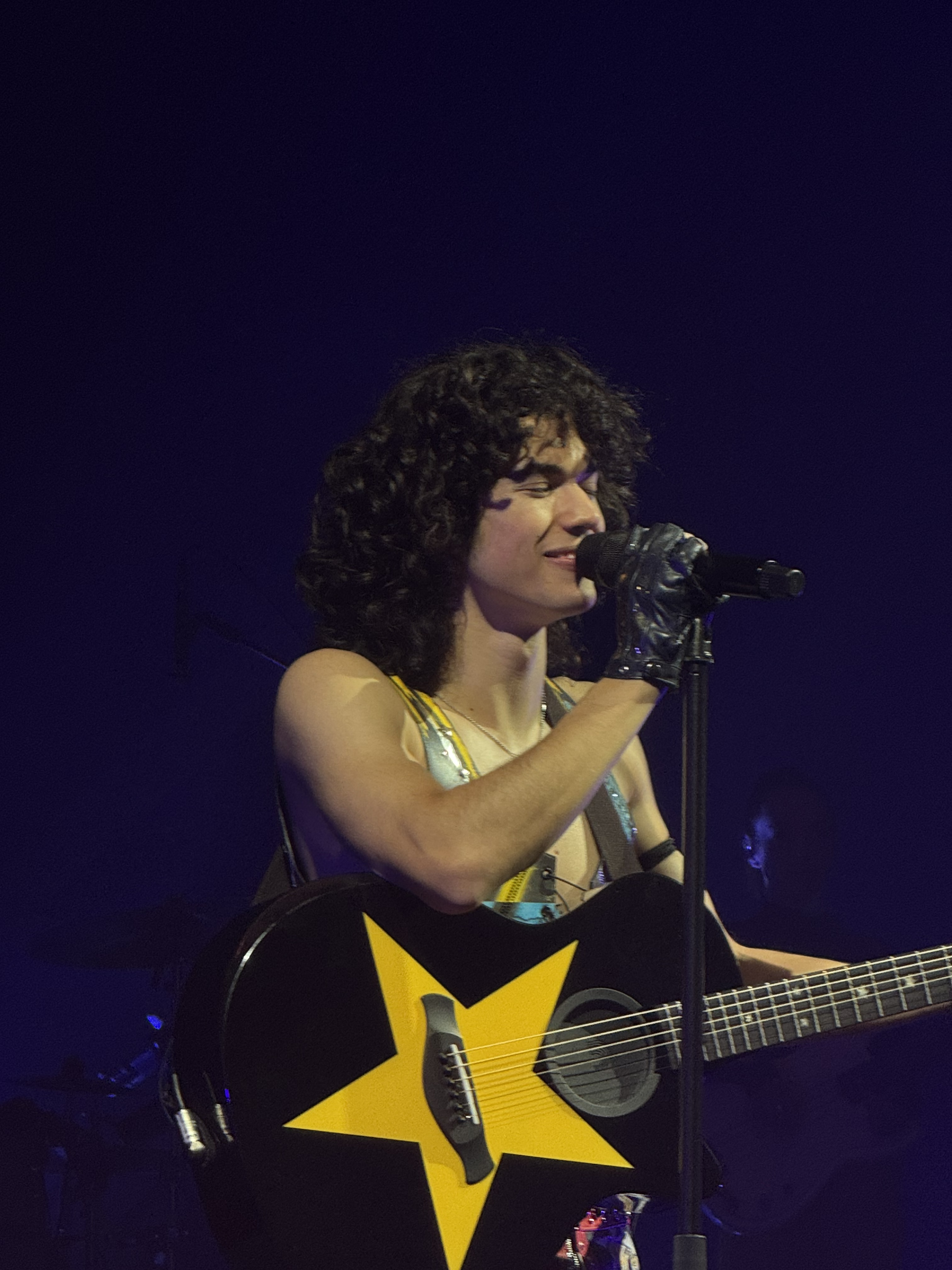
Gray during his Found Heaven On Tour in 2024.

In May 2023, Gray began posting teasers featuring images of grocery stores across his social media. The teasers were revealed to be in reference to the setting of a new music video that was released on May 19, accompanying the single "Never Ending Song". Both the video and single marked a departure from Gray's usual style and featured 80's inspired visuals and sounds; Gray acknowledged the artistic shift as a "celebration of emotions" and "the beginning of a story". On August 14, he announced a new single, "Winner", which was released on August 25. On October 31, Gray released the single "Killing Me".

On January 31, 2024, Gray announced his third studio album titled Found Heaven, which was released on April 5, as well as "Lonely Dancers", the album's fourth single, which was released on February 9. On March 8, he released the fifth single of the album, "Alley Rose". According to Ken Patridge of Genius, the first four singles off the album have featured an upbeat 80's vibe, while "Alley Rose" is a soaring piano-rock ballad that harks back to '70s-era Elton John. To support Found Heaven, Gray embarked on his fifth headlining concert tour, Found Heaven On Tour, in July 2024 which includes Australia, the US, Asia, Amsterdam, Paris and the UK.

On October 18, 2024, Gray released the single "Holidays" after first playing the song during the Found Heaven tour at Madison Square Garden. The song chronicles his experiences returning to his hometown in Texas for the holiday season.

=== 2025–2026: Kid Krow Decomposed, Wishbone and touring ===
In January 2025, Gray was announced as part of the lineup for the Governors Ball Music Festival, signaling the beginning of a new promotional cycle. On Wednesday, March 19, 2025, he surprise-released Kid Krow, Decomposed, a fifth-anniversary edition of his debut album Kid Krow. This edition featured a hand-drawn alternate cover by Gray, and featured three bonus tracks: an unreleased song titled "Bed Rest", and live versions of "The Cut That Always Bleeds" and "Heather", both recorded during Found Heaven on Tour.

On May 22, 2025, Gray announced his fourth studio album, Wishbone, which released on Friday, August 15, 2025. The announcement included the reveal of the album's artwork, which was Gray wearing a sailor costume on a blue background, as well as a short teaser video featuring Gray seated in a dimly lit car, accompanied by a snippet of new music. Wishbone is his first album owned by himself under GirlyBoy, Inc. Gray also shared that the album was produced by Dan Nigro, Ethan Gruska, Noah Conrad, Elvira Anderfjärd, and Luka Kloser. The lead single, titled "This Song" was released on May 30, 2025, featuring Corey Fogelmanis as Brando and Gray as Wilson. On May 29, 2025, he announced a tour for Wishbone titled the Wishbone Pajama Show that lasted from September 11 to October 19, 2025, and featured Hemlocke Springs as the opening act for the American shows. Andrea Bejar was the opening act for the shows in Mexico. The second single, "Vodka Cranberry", which appears as the album's third track, was released on July 11, 2025. Wishbone released on August 15 alongside the official music video for "Caramel". Fogelmanis and Gray reprise their roles in both "Vodka Cranberry" and "Caramel" music videos. On November 27, 2025, Conan performed "Vodka Cranberry" while appearing in the Macy's Thanksgiving Day Parade 2025. He also appeared in a Macy's commercial entitled, "Holiday Gift Hotline".

Gray in 2026 during his Wishbone World Tour.

On February 19, 2026, Gray embarked on the Wishbone World Tour with Esha Tewari as his opener. The tour had three legs in North America, Europe, and Oceania. There was 43 shows across all three legs. The tour concluded on October 8.

On March 21, 2026, Gray announced that "The Best", a song previously played on the Wishbone World Tour, would be released on March 27 as the lead single from the deluxe edition of Wishbone. On April 15, Gray announced the track list, featuring "The Best" and four new songs. Wishbone Deluxe released on April 24, 2026.

Almost 2 months later, on June 12, 2026, Gray provided backing vocals to the song "Honeybee". The song appeared on Olivia Rodrigo's album, You Seem Pretty Sad for a Girl So in Love.

== Artistry ==
Gray is known for his pop music, which has been tagged under the indie, acoustic, and bedroom subgenres. Teen Vogue called Gray "the pop prince for sad internet teens". He has a tenor vocal range.

=== Influences ===
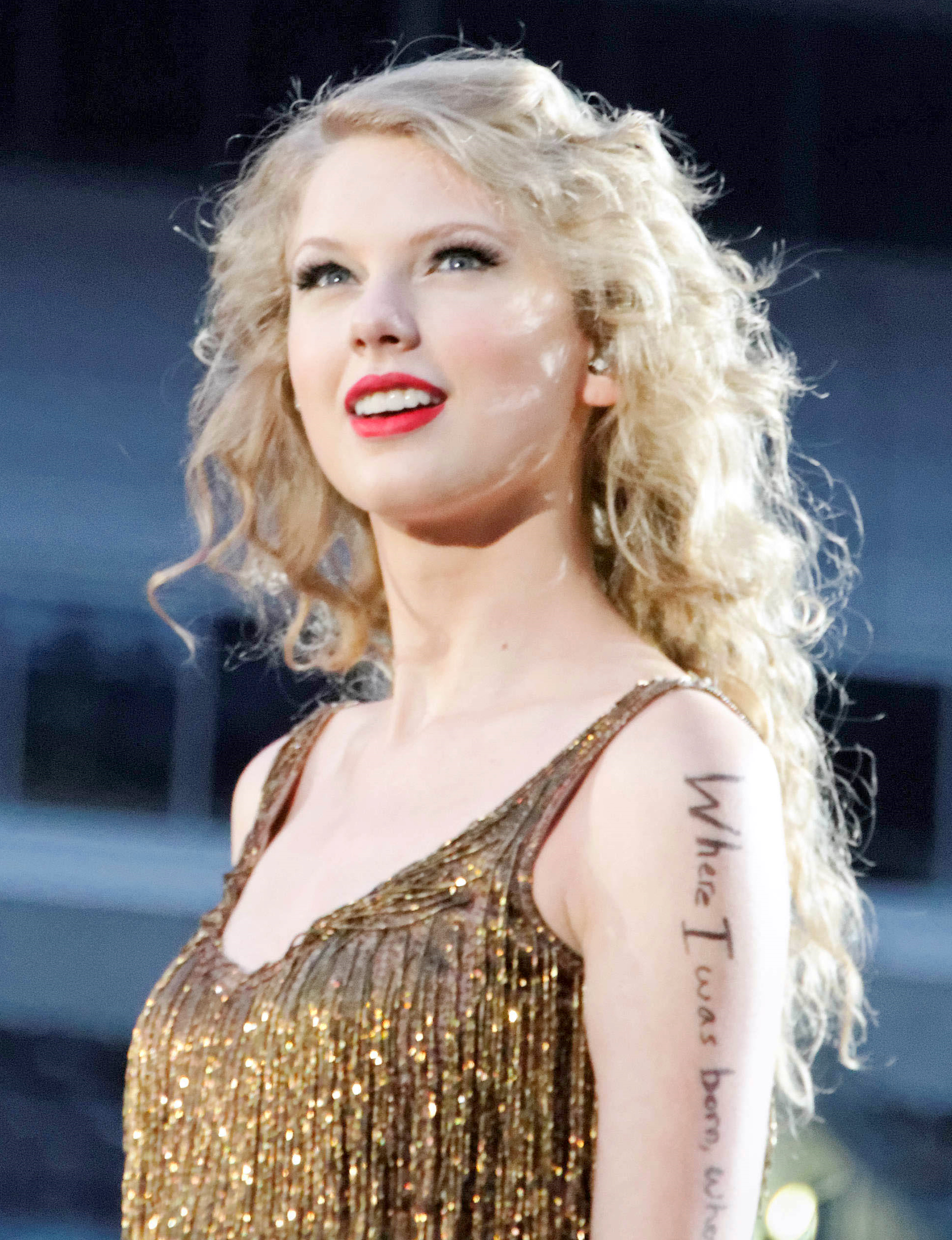
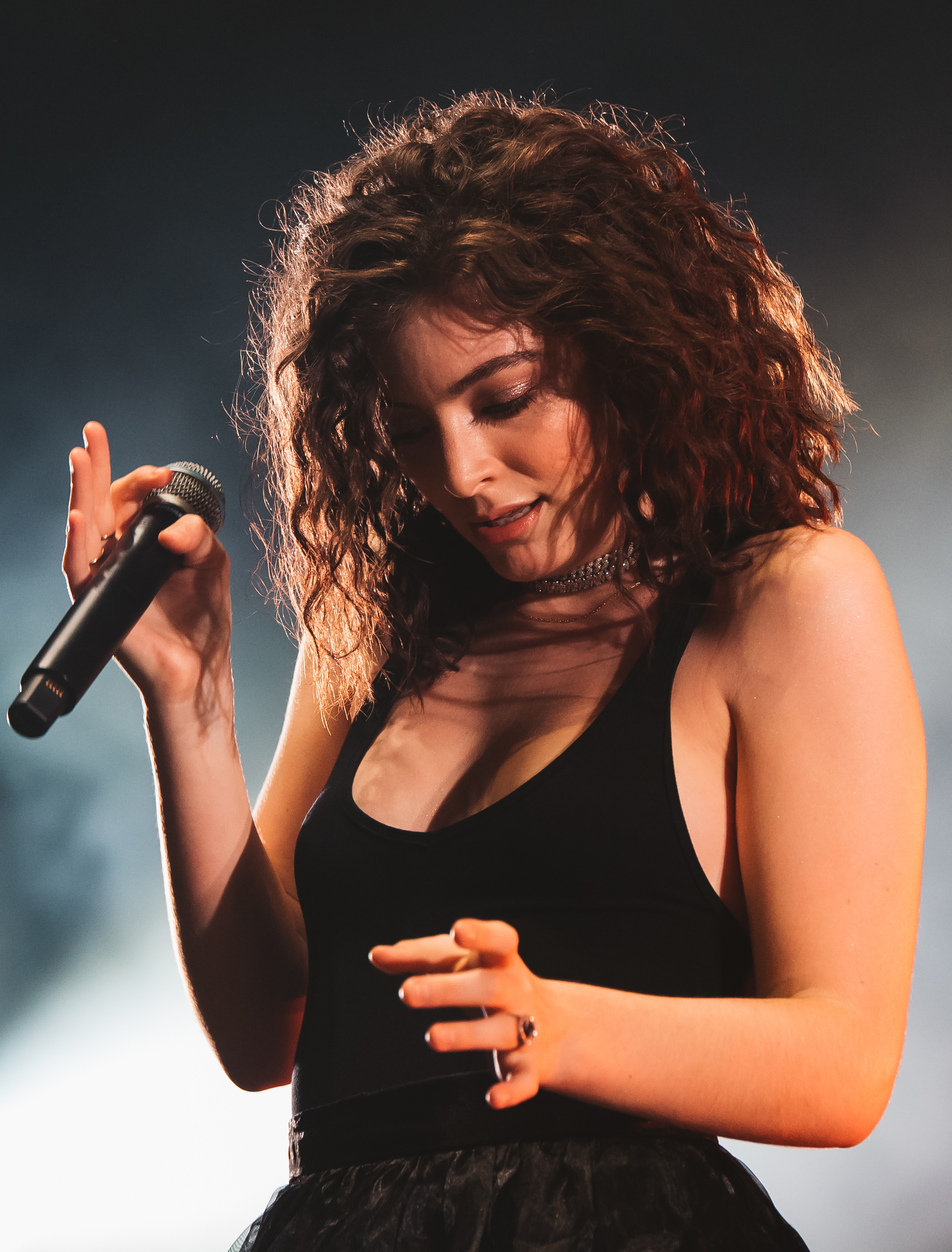
Gray names Taylor Swift (left) and Lorde (right) as his biggest influences.

Gray has cited Taylor Swift as his biggest inspiration, stating that he "was raised by [her]" and that he is "the largest Swiftie". He told People, "I love her so much. I love her music. I love what she does. I love her lyricism. I love how she's handled her career. She's just such a fucking boss. I grew up listening to her music since I was nine years old. I feel like she shaped me so much as a person." Swift praised Gray's debut album Kid Krow and the track "Wish You Were Sober" on her personal Instagram story, to which Gray responded, "Thank you for being my lifelong songwriting inspiration and icon. I honestly feel like you raised me both as a writer and a human and I cannot express in words how much that means to me. Thank you for everything. Swiftie for life." In an interview with Zane Lowe, for Apple Music, Gray stated that Swift is his "number one above all", and continued that "she's just my songwriting icon, and I'll never understand how she does what she does. She's just amazing". Gray also revealed that Swift messaged him and complimented Kid Krow.

Gray acknowledged Lorde as one of his other primary influences, and has explained that his EP Sunset Season was majorly inspired by the small-town nostalgia of her debut album Pure Heroine. He has also cited the Chicks and Adele as some of his musical influences, as well as expressing a mutual admiration for V of BTS, and Billie Eilish—Gray and Ellish have indicated each other as their "Z-Pack" pal. Talking about Eilish's rapid rise to fame in 2019, Gray told ET: "Billie and I have been friends since, like, literally forever, since she was, like, 15. I was like, 17. We were really young. Watching her have to figure out all these little things along the way has been really helpful for me." Gray has described Lana Del Rey as "a massive inspiration" in a 2017 tweet, and has covered several of her songs early in his career.

== Other ventures ==
Gray partners with and models for agencies and brands such as Puma, W magazine, Yves Saint Laurent, Vogue, Elle Men China, and Burberry.

== Personal life ==
Gray does not label his sexuality, but his music and imagery frequently portray queer themes. He has ADHD and synesthesia. He has multiple pets. He has dated one person who broke up with him whilst on a flight to London. He is friends with Olivia Rodrigo, Billie Eilish, Laufey, Corey Fogelmanis (who acted as Brando in the “This Song”, “Vodka Cranberry”, and “Caramel” music videos) and Ashley Combs (who Gray has written “Astronomy” and “Best Friend” about).

== Discography ==
=== Studio albums ===
- Kid Krow (2020)
- Superache (2022)
- Found Heaven (2024)
- Wishbone (2025)

== Awards and nominations ==
Year	Association	Category	Work	Result	Ref.
2019	Shorty Awards	Best YouTube Musician	Himself	Won	
2019	Streamy Awards	Breakthrough Artist	Himself	Nominated	
2020	MTV Europe Music Awards	Best Push Act	Himself	Nominated	
2020	MTV Video Music Awards	Push Artist of the Year	Himself	Longlisted	
2020	People's Choice Awards	Best New Artist of 2020	Himself	Nominated	
2024	Tribeca Festival Awards	Best Music Video	"Never Ending Song"	Won	
2025	UK Music Video Awards	Best Colour Grading in a Video	"Vodka Cranberry"	Nominated	
2026	GLAAD Media Awards	Outstanding Music Artist	Wishbone	Nominated	
2026	Queerties Awards	Best Music Video	"Vodka Cranberry"	Won	

== Tours ==
=== Headlining tours ===
- Sunset Shows (2018–19)
- Comfort Crowd Tour (2019)
- Conan Gray World Tour 2022 (2022)
- Superache Tour (2022–23)
- Found Heaven On Tour (2024)
- The Wishbone Pajama Show (2025)
- Wishbone World Tour (2026)

=== Supporting tours ===
- Pray for the Wicked Tour (2019) (Panic! at the Disco)

=== Cancelled tours ===
- Kid Krow World Tour (2020)
