= Crush Culture =

Single by Conan Gray

from the EP Sunset Season
- Released: October 26, 2018
- Genre: Bubblegum pop, indie pop
- Length: 3:23
- Songwriter: Conan Gray
- Producer: Dan Nigro

Conan Gray singles chronology
"Generation Why" (2018)	"Crush Culture" (2018)	"The Other Side" (2019)

Music video
- "Crush Culture" on YouTube

"Crush Culture" is a song by American singer-songwriter Conan Gray, released as the third single of his debut EP, Sunset Season, on October 26, 2018. The song was written by Gray and produced by Dan Nigro.

== Background ==
After a full year after the releases of "Idle Town" and "Grow", Conan decided to go back to music, releasing "Generation Why" and "Crush Culture" without much time apart from each other. On October 24th, exactly 3 weeks after the release of "Generation Why", Gray would for the first and only time tease the song, for then to release it along its music video two days later on October 26.

Gray explains that "Crush Culture" for him is "all of the flurry that happens around love. People who are in love texting each other, and, like, 'Who kissed who? And who did what?' And, like, 'Whoa, I can’t believe you did that.' That is crush culture and I don’t care about it." Conan also talks about what inspire the song for him, stating "I’ve never dated anyone before. I’m like nineteen and I still haven’t even had my first kiss yet. But like, throughout high school all my friends were always dating people and going through a lot of boyfriends and girlfriends and things like that so I was always super bitter about it, you know, I’d see them and I was like 'Ugh, disgusting, y'all are so in love' and I didn’t have it at all. I think Crush Culture came out of this spot of bitterness. I think everyone’s who’s single kinda looks at people who are in love and you kinda wanna be happy for them but you’re more just kinda like 'God, like y'all are so disgustingly in love. I wanna be you but I can’t so I’m just gonna beat you up', you know."

== Critical reception ==
David Renshaw from The Fader says that the song is for those who "has ever got a text and been left disappointed when it turned out to be from their service provider." Along, he also states that the music video is "a camp and dramatic visualization of envy and teenage hormones." Similarly, Prelude Press praises the song, saying "if this is any indication, Conan is definitely One To Watch." Finally, even Billboard comes aboard to the critique, appreciating the song and stating that it's "an anthem for loveless individuals who are fed up with watching romance happen from the sidelines."

== Certifications ==
Region	Certification	Certified United/Sales
Australia (ARIA)	Gold	400,000^{‡}
