= Found Heaven =

2024 studio album by Conan Gray

Studio album by Conan Gray
- Released: April 5, 2024
- Recorded: 2023
- Studios: No Expectations Studios (Hollywood), MXM Studios, The Village Studios, Subtle McNugget Studios (Los Angeles), House Mouse Studios (Stockholm)
- Genres: Synth-pop; dance-pop; electro; new wave
- Length: 36:42
- Label: Republic
- Producers: Shawn Everett; Fat Max Gsus; Oscar Holter; Luka Kloser; Greg Kurstin; Ilya; Max Martin

Conan Gray chronology
Superache (2022)	Found Heaven (2024)	Kid Krow, Decomposed (5 Year Anniversary) (2025)

Singles from Found Heaven
- 1. "Never Ending Song" Released: May 19, 2023; 2. "Winner" Released: August 25, 2023; 3. "Killing Me" Released: October 31, 2023; 4. "Lonely Dancers" Released: February 9, 2024; 5. "Alley Rose" Released: March 8, 2024

Found Heaven is the third studio album by the American singer-songwriter Conan Gray, released by Republic Records on April 5, 2024. The album was preceded by the singles "Never Ending Song", "Winner", "Killing Me", "Lonely Dancers", and "Alley Rose". To support Found Heaven, Gray embarked on his fifth headlining concert tour, Found Heaven On Tour in July 2024.

== Background and release ==
Gray released his second studio album, Superache, in June 2022. In May 2023, Gray began teasing new music. On May 19, he released the album's lead single, "Never Ending Song". The second single, "Winner" was released on August 25. "Killing Me" was released as the third single on October 31. Gray announced Found Heaven on January 31, 2024, and released the fourth single "Lonely Dancers" on February 9. Shortly afterwards, Gray announced an international tour to support the album and, on March 8, released "Alley Rose" as the fifth single. He released music videos for the songs "Never Ending Song" and "Lonely Dancers". There are no music videos for the other songs, except for their lyric videos.

On Found Heaven, Gray worked with producers Max Martin, Greg Kurstin, and Shawn Everett, among others. This is his first studio album without the involvement of Dan Nigro – who produced Gray's first two albums Kid Krow and Superache – which Gray stated was because Nigro had been working on Olivia Rodrigo's 2023 album Guts.

== Critical reception ==
Professional ratings
Aggregate scores
Source	Rating
Metacritic	76/100
Review scores
Source	Rating
AllMusic	4/5 stars
Dork	5/5 stars
Clash	7/10
DIY	4/5 stars

Found Heaven received generally positive reviews from music critics. Critics praised the album for its upbeat atmosphere, shift in lyricism, '80s aesthetics, and Gray's vocal performance. At Metacritic, which assigns a normalized rating out of 100 to reviews from mainstream critics, the album has an average score of 76 based on five reviews.

Found Heaven has been described as a pop, synth-pop, dance-pop, new wave, and electro album. Clash observed "aspects of everyone from the Human League to OMD via The Cure at their imperial chart-crushing best."

== Commercial performance ==
Found Heaven debuted at number fourteen on the US Billboard 200, with 36,857 album-equivalent units, Additionally, 16,000 of those sales were sold on vinyl alone, marking his third consecutive top ten on the Vinyl Albums chart as well, and his first number one album.

The album also debuted at number four on the UK Albums Chart, making it his second top-ten entry and his highest peaking one thus far.

== Track listing ==
Found Heaven track listing
No.	Title	Writer(s)	Producer(s)	Length
1.	"Found Heaven"	Conan Gray	Shawn Everett	2:57
2.	"Never Ending Song"	Gray; Max Martin; Ilya Salmanzadeh	Martin; Ilya	2:35
3.	"Fainted Love"	Gray; Martin	Martin; Oscar Holter	2:50
4.	"Lonely Dancers"	Gray; Martin; Holter; Salmanzadeh	Martin; Ilya; Holter	2:29
5.	"Alley Rose"	Gray	Greg Kurstin	3:29
6.	"The Final Fight"	Gray; Martin; Salmanzadeh; Holter	Martin; Holter; Ilya	2:09
7.	"Miss You"	Gray; Martin; Holter	Martin; Holter	2:23
8.	"Bourgeoisieses"	Gray; Max Grahn; Luka Kloser	Fat Max Gsus; Kloser	2:31
9.	"Forever with Me"	Gray; Kurstin	Kurstin	3:35
10.	"Eye of the Night"	Gray		2:21
11.	"Boys & Girls"	Gray; Martin; Holter	Martin; Holter	2:22
12.	"Killing Me"	Gray; Martin; Holter	Martin; Holter	3:24
13.	"Winner"	Gray; Kurstin	Kurstin	3:37
Total length:				36:42

== Personnel ==
Credits are adapted from the album's liner notes and Universal Music Group.

=== Musicians ===
- Conan Gray – vocals (all tracks), background vocals (tracks 1, 3, 4, 6, 7, 10–12)
- Omar Hakim – drums (tracks 1, 10)
- Pino Palladino – bass (tracks 1, 10)
- Michael Landau – guitar (tracks 1, 10)
- Shawn Everett – keyboards (tracks 1, 10)
- Money Mark – keyboards (tracks 1, 10)
- Max Martin – background vocals, guitar, keyboards, programming (2–4, 6, 7, 11, 12); bass, drums (2–4, 6, 7, 11); bass programming, drum programming, piano (12)
- Ilya Salmanzadeh – programming (tracks 2, 4, 6), background vocals (2, 4); bass, drums, keyboards (2)
- Luka Kloser – background vocals (tracks 2, 8); bass, drums, keyboards, programming (8)
- Lennon Kloser – guitar (track 2)
- Doris Sandberg – background vocals (track 2)
- Oscar Holter – bass, drums, keyboards, programming (tracks 3, 4, 6, 7, 11, 12); guitar (3, 6, 7, 11)
- Greg Kurstin – bass, drums, electric guitar, keyboards, Mellotron, percussion, piano, synthesizer (5, 9, 13); strings (13)
- Davide Rossi – string arrangement, cello, strings, viola, violin (track 5)
- Tove Burman – background vocals (tracks 8, 11)
- Elvira Anderfjärd – background vocals (tracks 8, 11)
- Fat Max Gsus – background vocals, bass, drums, keyboards, programming (track 8)
- Mattias Larsson – bass (track 12)

=== Technical and visuals ===
- Shawn Everett – recording (track 1), mixing (1, 10)
- Sam Holland – recording (tracks 2–4, 6)
- Jeremy Lertola – recording (tracks 2–4, 6)
- Max Martin – recording (tracks 3, 4, 6, 13)
- Oscar Holter – recording (tracks 3, 4, 6, 13)
- Michael Ilbert – recording (tracks 3, 4, 6, 13)
- Greg Kurstin – recording (tracks 5, 9, 13)
- Julian Burg – recording (tracks 5, 9, 13)
- Matt Tuggle – recording (tracks 5, 9, 13)
- Max Grahn – recording (track 8)
- Luka Kloser – recording (track 8)
- Ian Schick – recording (track 8)
- Amir Yaghmai – recording (track 10)
- Ian Gold – engineering assistance, mixing assistance (1, 10)
- Nick Hodges – engineering assistance (tracks 1, 10)
- Ivan Wayman – engineering assistance (tracks 1, 10)
- Serban Ghenea – mixing (tracks 2–4, 6–8, 11, 12)
- Mark "Spike" Stent – mixing (tracks 5, 9, 13)
- Bryce Bordone – mix engineering (tracks 2, 4, 7, 8, 11), mixing assistance (12)
- Randy Merrill – mastering
- Conan Gray – creative direction
- Elizaveta Porodina – photography
- Drew Gleason – art direction
- Emily Woodfield – art direction

== Charts ==
Chart performance for Found Heaven
Chart (2024)	Peak position
Australian Albums (ARIA)	10
Austrian Albums (Ö3 Austria)	22
Belgian Albums (Ultratop Flanders)	8
Belgian Albums (Ultratop Wallonia)	26
Canadian Albums (Billboard)	98
Croatian International Albums (HDU)	16
Dutch Albums (Album Top 100)	12
German Albums (Offizielle Top 100)	11
Irish Albums (Official Charts)	26
New Zealand Albums (RMNZ)	33
Polish Albums (ZPAV)	8
Scottish Albums (Official Charts)	2
Spanish Albums (Promusicae)	15
Swiss Albums (Schweizer Hitparade)	84
UK Albums (Official Charts)	4
US Billboard 200	14

Chart (2026)	Peak position
Greek Albums (IFPI)	99
