= Sunset Season =

EP by Conan Gray
- Released: November 16, 2018
- Recorded: 2017–2018
- Length: 18:36
- Language: English
- Label: Republic
- Producers: Dan Nigro, Conan Gray

Conan Gray chronology
Sunset Season (2018)	Kid Krow (2020)

Singles from Sunset Season
- 1. "Idle Town" Released: March 19, 2017; 2. "Generation Why" Released: October 3, 2018; 3. "Crush Culture" Released: October 26, 2018

Sunset Season is the debut extended play by American singer-songwriter Conan Gray. It was released under Republic Records on November 16, 2018. Sunset Season was primarily produced by Dan Nigro and co-produced by Conan Gray, who also wrote and composed the five-track EP. Gray released "Idle Town", "Generation Why", and "Crush Culture" as singles.

== Background ==
Before Sunset Season, Conan Gray was known as a Youtube creator, gaining widespread popularity through covers and acoustic singles. The first single off of Sunset Season, titled "Idle Town", caught the attention of record labels and industry professionals, leading to the completion of the EP. Following the release of the EP, Gray made his television debut on Late Night with Seth Meyers, performing "Crush Culture". In October 2018, Gray began the Sunset Shows tour in support of the project. The tour began as a few shows in major US cities, but later expanded into a full US and Europe tour. It ran until May 2019.

Sunset Season was largely written during Conan Gray's senior year of high school. His inspiration for songwriting often came from everyday life, usually starting with lyrics that he thought up unexpectedly. He recalls his senior year of high school feeling like the "sunset" to his childhood, inspiring the theme and title of Sunset Season. The recording process mostly took place during Gray's first and only quarter at UCLA. "I'd go to class eat lunch in the dining hall and then go to the studio for nine hours,” he mentioned in an interview with the Daily Sundial. The massive time commitment and promising future of Gray's music career led him to leave UCLA and pursue music full-time.

Daniel Nigro worked closely with Gray on this record, having recorded the entire EP in his garage. Gray has cited Lorde's debut album, Pure Heroine, as a major inspiration for the EP because of its small-town nostalgia. His upbringing as a military kid led him to adopt an introspective and introverted demeanor, inspiring the observant tone heard throughout Sunset Season. In interviews, Gray described the concept of the EP as revolving around a fictional world called "Sunset High", representing a suburban school environment resemblant of his own public high school in Georgetown, Texas.

In November 2019, Gray took to Twitter to celebrate the one year anniversary of the EP's release, stating "can't even begin to explain how much these five songs changed my life, so i’m not even going to try to. just. i'm happier now than i've ever been my whole entire life. so thank u." The tweet featured a screenshot of the EP's growth on Spotify, showing that it had gained over 145 million streams in one year.

== Visual representation ==
Conan Gray played a large role in the making of the visual art for Sunset Season. He took a hands-on approach to the music video for "Crush Culture", directing all shoots and even editing the final product. Sunset Season follows a cohesive retro aesthetic, leaning into primary colors and oversaturated imagery. Conan Gray considers himself a "control freak," causing him to work on large portions of the visual representation for his music. For Sunset Season, Gray photographed the album cover and designed merchandise on his own.

== Track listing ==
All tracks are written by Conan Gray.

No.	Title	Producer(s)	Length
1.	"Idle Town"	Conan Gray	3:58
2.	"Generation Why"	Daniel Nigro	3:40
3.	"Crush Culture"	Nigro	3:24
4.	"Greek God"	Nigro	3:57
5.	"Lookalike"	Nigro	3:41
Total length:			18:36

== Credits and personnel ==
The credits adapted from Tidal.

- Conan Gray – vocalist (all tracks), lyricist (all tracks), producer (track 1), keyboard (track 1), additional vocals (all tracks)
- Daniel Nigro – producer (tracks 2–5), bass (tracks 2–4), guitar (tracks 2–3), drum programming (tracks 2–4), mellotron (tracks 2–3), mixing (track 2)
- Rob Kinelski – mixing (tracks 3–5)
- Ryan Linvil – drum programming (tracks 2–4)
- Kate Brady – additional vocals (track 2)
- Yves Rothman – drum programming (track 3)

== Charts ==
Chart (2018)	Peak position
UK Download Albums (OCC)	57
US Billboard 200	116
