= Astronomy (Conan Gray song) =

Single by Conan Gray

from the album Superache
- Released: May 7, 2021
- Genre: Indie pop
- Length: 4:03
- Label: Republic
- Songwriters: Conan Gray, Dan Nigro
- Producer: Dan Nigro

Conan Gray singles chronology
"Overdrive" (2021)	"Astronomy" (2021)	"People Watching" (2021)

Music video
- Music video on YouTube

"Astronomy" is a song by singer-songwriter Conan Gray released under Republic Records on May 7, 2021, for his second album, Superache. The track was written by Gray and co-written and produced by Dan Nigro.

== Background and release ==
After the breakout of his debut album, Kid Krow, Gray emerged into another era of his life. Not many months after "Heather" went popular all throughout social media and became a single, Conan releases his long awaited new single called "Overdrive." After seeing that it performed well, he publishes another single, which is this track. Gray releases "Astronomy" as the lead single for his second studio album, Superache. Conan had been teasing about "Astronomy" for months, on Instagram reels, he mainly posted mini snippets of the song and left his fan hanging alone, awaiting for more.

== Critical reception ==
VMagazine starts out the critique by calling "Astronomy" "a bare bones track that relies on simple strings and melodies with an almost country twang to it, for extra emotional heft." While Bleached similarly, called the track "another beautiful song that shows a maturity and growth in Conan Gray’s artistry as he learns how to articulate his feelings even more in-depthly." Also naming it "emotionally raw" and "ultimately stunning." However, there is of course, negativity. The Roar was disappointed with the song, and calls it "nothing special, and blends into the rest of his discography." Along with calling it's lyrics "cliche" and him "lacking any of the personality present in his older works."

== Music video ==
Gray premiered a music video for the track on its release day, May 7, 2021 along with a lyric video accompanying the single's release. As of August 2026, the music video has accumulated 14.0 Million views on YouTube, while the lyric video has amounted 12.9 Million views. The music video shows a Point-of-view shot where the video centers in Conan's face, making it feel as if we were living a life along him. This is very distinctive from his other music videos, like Checkmate, where he's known for raging and letting his anger out. A similarity though is shared with the music video for single "Heather", where there's a similar point of view perspective.

== Certifications ==
Region	Certification	Certified Units/Sales
Australia (ARIA)	Gold	400,000^{‡}
Canada (MC)	Platinum	1,000,000^{‡}
New Zealand (RMNZ)	Gold	400,000^{‡}
United States (RIAA)	Platinum	1,000,000^{‡}
