= Chappell Roan discography =

Discography of American singer and songwriter

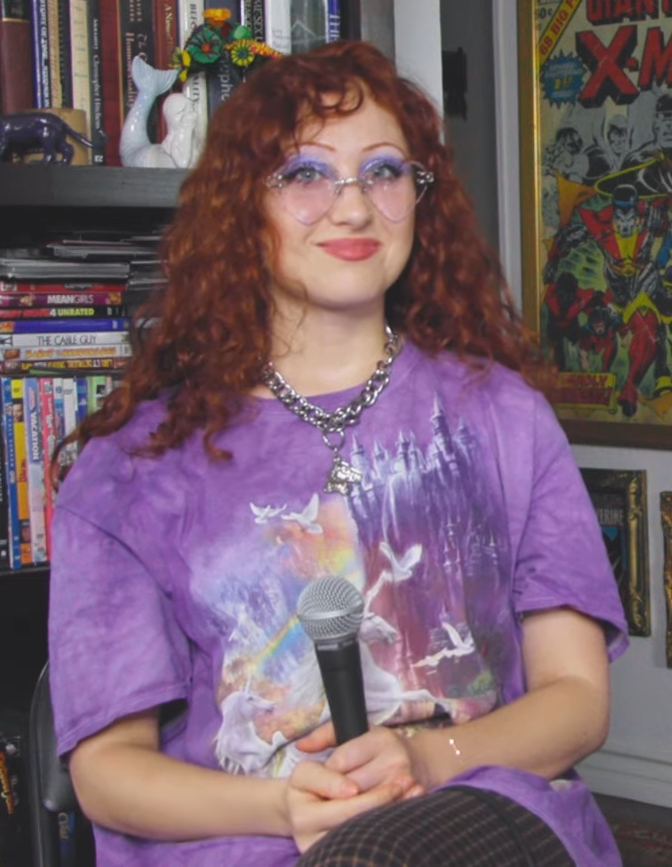
- Roan in 2023
- Studio albums: 1
- EPs: 1
- Singles: 16
- Music videos: 11

American singer and songwriter Chappell Roan has released one studio album, one extended play, sixteen singles, and eleven music videos.

In 2017, Roan released her debut extended play, School Nights with Atlantic Records before being dropped by them in 2020. After signing with Amusement Records, in partnership with Island Records, Roan released her debut studio album, The Rise and Fall of a Midwest Princess (2023) which went on to become a sleeper hit following the success of her 2024 single "Good Luck, Babe!". The single marked Roan's first entry on the US Billboard Hot 100 peaking at number four, and topped the US Pop Airplay chart. That same year, her debut album peaked at number two on the US Billboard 200, and topped the albums charts in Ireland, New Zealand, and the United Kingdom. (Note: As per the Official Charts Company.) Other singles from the album, "Pink Pony Club" and "Hot to Go!", went on to peak at number four and 15 on the Hot 100 respectively. In 2025, Roan released the top-five Hot 100 singles "The Giver" and "The Subway".

== Studio albums ==
List of studio albums, with selected chart positions, sales figures and certifications
| Title | Album details | Peak chart positions | | | | | | | | | | Sales (Note: Pure sales and not equivalent units (streaming and song downloads)) | Certifications |
| Title | Album details | US | AUS | CAN | IRE | NLD | NOR | NZ | SWE | SWI | UK | Sales | Certifications |
|---|---|---|---|---|---|---|---|---|---|---|---|---|---|
| The Rise and Fall of a Midwest Princess | Released: September 22, 2023; Label: Island, Amusement; Format: CD, LP, cassette, digital download, streaming | 2 | 3 | 3 | 1 | 2 | 18 | 1 | 20 | 16 | 1 | US: 652,000 | RIAA: 2× Platinum; ARIA: Gold; BPI: 2× Platinum; MC: Platinum; RMNZ: 3× Platinum |

== Extended plays ==
| Title | EP details |
|---|---|
| School Nights | Released: September 22, 2017; Label: Atlantic; Format: Digital download, streaming; Track listing: 1. "Die Young"; 2. "Good Hurt"; 3. "Meantime"; 4. "Sugar High"; 5. "Bad for You" |

== Singles ==
=== As lead artist ===
| Title | Year | Peak chart positions | | | | | | | | | | Certifications | Album |
| Title | Year | US | AUS | CAN | IRE | NLD | NZ | SWE | SWI | UK | WW | Certifications | Album |
|---|---|---|---|---|---|---|---|---|---|---|---|---|---|
| "Turning To Wax" | 2013 | — | — | — | — | — | — | — | — | — | — | | Non-album single |
| "Good Hurt" | 2017 | — | — | — | — | — | — | — | — | — | — | | School Nights |
| "Bitter" | 2018 | — | — | — | — | — | — | — | — | — | — | | Non-album singles |
| "School Nights" | 2018 | — | — | — | — | — | — | — | — | — | — | | Non-album singles |
| "Pink Pony Club" | 2020 | 4 | 2 | 2 | 2 | 71 | 11 | 58 | 57 | 1 | 16 | RIAA: 5× Platinum; ARIA: 4× Platinum; BPI: 4× Platinum; MC: Platinum; RMNZ: 3× Platinum | The Rise and Fall of a Midwest Princess |
| "Love Me Anyway" | 2020 | — | — | — | — | — | — | — | — | — | — | | Non-album single |
| "California" | 2020 | — | — | — | — | — | — | — | — | — | — | | The Rise and Fall of a Midwest Princess |
| "Naked in Manhattan" | 2022 | — (Note: "Naked in Manhattan" did not enter the Billboard Hot 100, but peaked at number 16 on the Bubbling Under Hot 100 chart.) | — | — | — | — | — | — | — | — | — | RIAA: Gold; ARIA: Gold; BPI: Silver; RMNZ: Gold | The Rise and Fall of a Midwest Princess |
| "My Kink Is Karma" | 2022 | 81 | — | 98 | — | — | — | — | — | — | — | RIAA: Platinum; ARIA: Gold; BPI: Gold; MC: Gold; RMNZ: Gold | The Rise and Fall of a Midwest Princess |
| "Femininomenon" | 2022 | 66 | — | 69 | — | — | — | — | — | — | — | RIAA: Platinum; ARIA: Gold; BPI: Gold; MC: Platinum; RMNZ: Platinum | The Rise and Fall of a Midwest Princess |
| "Casual" | 2022 | 59 | 83 | 64 | 37 | — | — | — | — | 44 | 124 | RIAA: 2× Platinum; ARIA: Platinum; BPI: Platinum; MC: Platinum; RMNZ: Platinum | The Rise and Fall of a Midwest Princess |
| "Kaleidoscope" | 2023 | — | — | — | — | — | — | — | — | — | — | | The Rise and Fall of a Midwest Princess |
| "Red Wine Supernova" | 2023 | 41 | 63 | 47 | 27 | — | — (Note: "Red Wine Supernova" did not enter the NZ Top 40 Singles Chart, but peaked at number 32 on the NZ Hot Singles Chart.) | — | — | 31 | 72 | RIAA: 2× Platinum; ARIA: Platinum; BPI: Platinum; MC: Platinum; RMNZ: Platinum | The Rise and Fall of a Midwest Princess |
| "Hot to Go!" | 2023 | 15 | — | 19 | 5 | — | 17 | — | — | 4 | 17 | RIAA: 4× Platinum; BPI: 2× Platinum; MC: 2× Platinum; RMNZ: 2× Platinum | The Rise and Fall of a Midwest Princess |
| "Good Luck, Babe!" | 2024 | 4 | 4 | 4 | 1 | 25 | 5 | 26 | 18 | 2 | 5 | RIAA: 6× Platinum; ARIA: 8× Platinum; BPI: 4× Platinum; MC: 4× Platinum; RMNZ: 5× Platinum | TBA |
| "The Giver" | 2025 | 5 | 14 | 10 | 5 | 67 | 14 | 52 | 96 | 2 | 10 | RIAA: Gold; BPI: Gold; RMNZ: Gold | TBA |
| "The Subway" | 2025 | 3 | 4 | 4 | 2 | 35 | 3 | 22 | 36 | 1 | 3 | RIAA: Gold; ARIA: Gold; BPI: Platinum; MC: Gold; RMNZ: Platinum | TBA |
"—" denotes a recording that did not chart in that territory.

=== As featured artist ===
| Title | Year | Peak chart positions | | | | | | Certifications | Album |
| Title | Year | US | CAN | IRE | SWI | UK | WW | Certifications | Album |
|---|---|---|---|---|---|---|---|---|---|
| "Expectations" (Olivia Rodrigo featuring Chappell Roan) | 2026 | 3 | 6 | 2 | 20 | 3 | 2 | BPI: Silver | You Seem Pretty Sad for a Girl So in Love |

== Other charted and certified songs ==
| Title | Year | Peak chart positions | Certifications | Album |
| Title | Year | US Bub. | Certifications | Album |
|---|---|---|---|---|
| "After Midnight" | 2023 | 22 | RIAA: Gold; ARIA: Gold; BPI: Silver; RMNZ: Gold | The Rise and Fall of a Midwest Princess |
| "Picture You" | 2023 | — | RIAA: Gold; BPI: Silver; RMNZ: Gold | The Rise and Fall of a Midwest Princess |
| "Super Graphic Ultra Modern Girl" | 2023 | 16 | RIAA: Gold; ARIA: Gold; BPI: Silver; RMNZ: Gold | The Rise and Fall of a Midwest Princess |
"—" denotes a recording that did not chart in that territory.

== Guest appearances ==
List of non-single guest appearances, with other performing artists, showing role, year released and album name
| Title | Year | Other artist(s) | Role(s) | Album |
|---|---|---|---|---|
| "Better Days" | 2022 | Dermot Kennedy | Background vocals | Sonder |
| "The Hardest Part" | 2022 | Alexander 23 | Background vocals | Aftershock |
| "Bad Idea Right?" | 2023 | Olivia Rodrigo | Background vocals | Guts |
| "Lacy" | 2023 | Olivia Rodrigo | Background vocals | Guts |
| "Get Him Back!" | 2023 | Olivia Rodrigo | Background vocals | Guts |
| "Obsessed" | 2023 | Olivia Rodrigo | Background vocals | Guts |
| "Can't Catch Me Now" | 2023 | Olivia Rodrigo | Background vocals | The Hunger Games: The Ballad of Songbirds & Snakes |
| "Hey You" | 2024 | Blu DeTiger | Songwriting; Background vocals | All I Ever Want Is Everything |

== Music videos ==
| Title | Year | Director | Ref(s) |
|---|---|---|---|
| "Good Hurt" | 2017 | Griffin Stoddard | |
| "Die Young" | 2018 | Catie Laffoon | |
| "Sugar High" | 2018 | Ethan Seneker | |
| "Pink Pony Club" | 2020 | Griffin Stoddard | |
| "Naked in Manhattan" | 2022 | Ryan Clemens and Chappell Roan | |
| "My Kink Is Karma" | 2022 | Hadley Hillel | |
| "Casual" | 2022 | Hadley Hillel | |
| "Kaleidoscope" (Official Live Performance) | 2023 | Hadley Hillel | |
| "Red Wine Supernova" (Magician's Cut) | 2023 | Ryan Clemens | |
| "Hot to Go!" | 2023 | Jackie! Zhou | |
| "The Subway" | 2025 | Amber Grace Johnson | |
