= Visions of Damsels & Other Dangerous Things Tour =

2025–2026 concert tour by Chappell Roan

- Tour by Chappell Roan
- Promotional poster
- Location: Europe; North America; Oceania; South America
- Start date: May 30, 2025
- End date: March 21, 2026
- Legs: 4
- No. of shows: 34

Chappell Roan concert chronology
- The Midwest Princess Tour (2023–2024); Visions of Damsels & Other Dangerous Things Tour (2025–2026)

The Visions of Damsels & Other Dangerous Things Tour was a concert tour by American singer and songwriter Chappell Roan. It began on May 30, 2025, in Warsaw, Poland, as part of Orange Warsaw Festival, and concluded on March 21, 2026, in São Paulo, Brazil, as part of Lollapalooza. The tour's set list included songs from Roan's debut studio album, The Rise and Fall of a Midwest Princess (2023), along with the standalone singles "Good Luck, Babe!", "The Giver", and "The Subway", and a cover version of Heart's 1977 song "Barracuda".

== Background and opening acts ==
The Visions of Damsels & Other Dangerous Things Tour originally consisted of only music festival stops. However, on July 24, 2025, Roan announced a series of "pop-up" shows across the United States. Several musicians and local drag performers served as the tour's opening acts, including Baby Tate, Japanese Breakfast, Hemlocke Springs, and Trixie Mattel.

== Set list ==
This set list is representative of the October 3, 2025, show in Kansas City, United States. It does not represent all dates of the tour.

1. "Super Graphic Ultra Modern Girl"
2. "Femininomenon"
3. "After Midnight"
4. "Naked in Manhattan"
5. "Guilty Pleasure"
6. "Casual"
7. "The Subway"
8. "Hot to Go!"
9. "Barracuda" (Heart Cover)
10. "Picture You"
11. "Kaleidoscope"
12. "The Giver"
13. "Red Wine Supernova"
14. "Coffee"
15. "Good Luck, Babe!"
16. "My Kink Is Karma"
17. "California"
18. "Pink Pony Club"

== Tour dates ==
List of 2025 concerts
Date	City	Country	Venue
May 30 (Note: Part of Orange Warsaw Festival.)	Warsaw	Poland	Tor Wyścigów Konnych Służewiec
June 7 (Note: Part of Primavera Sound Festival.)	Barcelona	Spain	Parc del Fòrum
August 6 (Note: Part of Øya Festival.)	Oslo	Norway	Tøyen Park
August 7 (Note: Part of Syd for Solen Festival.)	Copenhagen	Denmark	Valbyparken
August 9 (Note: Part of Way Out West Festival.)	Gothenburg	Sweden	Slottsskogen
August 11 (Note: Part of Sziget Festival.)	Budapest	Hungary	Óbudai-sziget
August 13 (Note: Part of FM4 Frequency Festival.)	Sankt Pölten	Austria	Greenpark St. Pölten
August 15 (Note: Part of Pukkelpop Festival.)	Hasselt	Belgium	Kempische Steenweg Motorway
August 16 (Note: Part of Lowlands Festival.)	Dronten	Netherlands	Spijk en Bremerberg
August 19	Zurich	Switzerland	Hallenstadion
August 20 (Note: Part of Rock en Seine.)	Paris	France	Parc de Saint-Cloud
August 22 (Note: Part of Reading Festival.)	Reading	England	Little John's Farm
August 23 (Note: Part of Leeds Festival.)	Leeds	England	Bramham Park
August 26 (Note: Part of Edinburgh Summer Sessions.)	Edinburgh	Scotland	Royal Highland Centre
August 27 (Note: Part of Edinburgh Summer Sessions.)	Edinburgh	Scotland	Royal Highland Centre
August 29 (Note: Part of Electric Picnic Festival.)	Stradbally	Ireland	Stradbally Hall
September 20	New York City	United States	Forest Hills Stadium
September 21	New York City	United States	Forest Hills Stadium
September 23	New York City	United States	Forest Hills Stadium
September 24	New York City	United States	Forest Hills Stadium
October 3	Kansas City	United States	Museum and Memorial Park
October 4	Kansas City	United States	Museum and Memorial Park
October 10	Pasadena	United States	Brookside at the Rose Bowl
October 11	Pasadena	United States	Brookside at the Rose Bowl
November 14 (Note: Part of Corona Capital.)	Mexico City	Mexico	Autódromo Hermanos Rodríguez

List of 2026 concerts
Date	City	Country	Venue
February 5 (Note: Part of Laneway Festival Auckland.)	Auckland	New Zealand	Western Springs Stadium
February 7 (Note: Part of Laneway Festival Gold Coast.)	Gold Coast	Australia	Southport Sharks
February 8 (Note: Part of Laneway Festival Sydney.)	Sydney	Australia	Centennial Park
February 13 (Note: Part of Laneway Festival Melbourne.)	Melbourne	Australia	Flemington Park
February 14 (Note: Part of Laneway Festival Adelaide.)	Adelaide	Australia	Adelaide Showground
February 15 (Note: Part of Laneway Festival Perth.)	Perth	Australia	Arena Joondalup
March 14 (Note: Part of Lollapalooza Argentina.)	Buenos Aires	Argentina	Hipódromo de San Isidro
March 15 (Note: Part of Lollapalooza Chile.)	Santiago	Chile	O'Higgins Park
March 21 (Note: Part of Lollapalooza Brazil.)	São Paulo	Brazil	Autódromo de Interlagos
