= Super Graphic Ultra Modern Girl =

2023 song by Chappell Roan

Song by Chappell Roan

from the album The Rise and Fall of a Midwest Princess
- Released: September 22, 2023
- Studio: Amusement (Los Angeles)
- Genre: House; dance; electro; electroclash; electropop
- Length: 3:03
- Label: Amusement; Island
- Songwriters: Kayleigh Rose Amstutz; Dan Nigro; Annika Bennett; Jonah Shy; Mike Wise
- Producers: Dan Nigro; Mike Wise

Visualizer
- "Super Graphic Ultra Modern Girl" on YouTube

"Super Graphic Ultra Modern Girl" is a song by American singer-songwriter Chappell Roan. It was released as the sixth track of Roan's debut album, The Rise and Fall of a Midwest Princess, on September 22, 2023, through Amusement and Island Records. Blending various pop, electronic, and dance subgenres and 1980s influences, "Super Graphic Ultra Modern Girl" was produced by Dan Nigro and Mike Wise.

Roan's narration throughout the song describes her dislike for dating "hyper-mega-bummer boys" and want for a "super graphic ultra modern girl" like her. "Super Graphic Ultra Modern Girl" was well-received by critics, who praised the song's upbeat nature and lyricism. Commercially, the song peaked at number 16 on the US Billboard Bubbling Under Hot 100 chart and received certifications in Australia, Brazil, New Zealand, the United Kingdom, and the United States.

== Background and release ==
Kayleigh Amstutz, later known as Chappell Roan, began posting cover songs to YouTube in 2014. She also posted an original song, "Die Young". This caught the attention of Australian singer Troye Sivan, who advised his fanbase to "go give her some love". She adopted the stage name Chappell Roan and signed to Atlantic Records in 2015. While under the label, she released her debut EP, School Nights (2017), and three singles in 2020: "Pink Pony Club", "Love Me Anyway", and "California". She was dropped by Atlantic in 2020 following the release of the singles and moved back to her home state of Missouri following this.

While still signed with Atlantic, Roan worked with producer Dan Nigro, who would become known for his work with Olivia Rodrigo. She would return to music in 2022 with the self-released single "Naked in Manhattan". In 2023, Roan signed to Amusement Records, an imprint of Island Records that Nigro started to fund Roan's projects. "Super Graphic Ultra Modern Girl" was released as the sixth track of The Rise and Fall of a Midwest Princess on September 22, 2023, alongside an accompanying visualizer. A demo version was released with a Tidal reissue of the album.

== Composition and lyrics ==
"Super Graphic Ultra Modern Girl" has a run time of three minutes and three seconds. Musically, it has been described as a pop, electropop, electroclash, electro, house, and dance track, taking influence from 1980s music. Written in the key of C♯ major, it is an upbeat song with a "stomping" tempo of 126 beats per minute.

"Super Graphic Ultra Modern Girl" focuses on Roan's dislike for dating men. She has stated that the title of the song was inspired by an Architecture Digest video in which the narrator says a house's architecture is "super graphic and ultra-modern". The lyrics call men "hyper-mega-bummer boys" and condemn them for wearing "fugly jeans", all while Roan "harnesses her power". Roan takes what has been described as a "main-character monologue" by Pitchfork's Olivia Horn in the opening verse. The lyrics also state that Roan is "not overdramatic", and states she needs a "super graphic ultra modern girl like [her]."

In an interview with Rolling Stone, Roan expressed her admiration for Charli XCX and that she wanted to work with producer Mike Wise. Wise was known for producing the song "Yuck," off of Charli XCX’s fifth studio album, Crash (2022). Roan also said she wanted to make a song that "drag queens can do fully." In an NME interview preceding her album’s release, Roan stated that wrote the song "for the gays" and that she thought listeners would be most surprised by it.

Roan wrote the track with Dan Nigro, Annika Bennett, Jonah Shy, and Mike Wise. Nigro handled keyboards, engineering, drum programming, synthesizers, guitar, and produced the track with Wise and assistant producer Shy. Serban Ghenea mixed the track with assistance from Bryce Bordone, and Randy Merrill mastered it. Recording took place at Amusement Studios.

== Critical reception ==
"Super Graphic Ultra Modern Girl" has been described as "excellent" and was generally met with positive reviews. Vogue (Note: Liam Hess stated that it was a "banger that's made for strutting to work", and Alex Jhamb Burns said it was her favorite song on the album.) and Billboard (Note: Stephen Daw stated that the song was fueled by "pop adrenaline", Jason Lipshutz, Joe lynch, and Starr Bowenblank say that the song "represents an eyeroll", and Billboard Philippines states the song "oozes confidence".) journalists have praised the song. AllMusic declared that the 80s throwback had one of the best choruses throughout the entire album. DIY’s Otis Robinson says that a track like "Super Graphic Ultra Modern Girl" blends "teen melodrama with queer euphoria". Sam Franzini praised Roan’s lyricism. Dani Maher called both "Super Graphic Ultra Modern Girl" and "Femininomenon" "over-the-top upbeat tracks". Elle said that Roan gave great advice in the song: "Never EVER waste a Friday night on a first date". Vulture said that "Super Graphic Ultra Modern Girl" is a "phrase with perfect rhythm". Deia Penn says Roan dismisses heterosexuality for a "hypothetical 'Super Graphic Ultra Modern Girl' who can match her high-femme, high-camp energy".

Many comparisons were made between the song and other pop culture icons. These include Confidence Man, Madonna's Ray of Light (1998), Barbie (2023), Footloose (1984), RuPaul's "Supermodel" (1992), and Scissor Sisters' "Let's Have a Kiki" (2012). Multiple reviews noticed the influences from Lady Gaga, especially her album Chromatica (2020).

"Super Graphic Ultra Modern Girl" was ranked on multiple end-of-year song lists, including ones from the Los Angeles Times and Elle.

Critics' year-end rankings of "Super Graphic Ultra Modern Girl"
| Publication | List | Rank | Ref. |
|---|---|---|---|
| Elle | The Best Songs of 2023 | —N/a | |
| Los Angeles Times | The 100 Best Songs of 2023 | 19 | |
| Them | Our 23 Favorite Songs by LGBTQ+ Artists in 2023 | —N/a | |

== Commercial performance ==
Roan experienced a growth in popularity after opening for Rodrigo on the Guts World Tour and after the release of "Good Luck, Babe!" (2024). Because of this, "Super Graphic Ultra Modern Girl" would begin to chart almost a year after its release. The song debuted at number 24 on the US Billboard Bubbling Under Hot 100 chart for August 17, 2024. It peaked at number 16 on that chart and failed to enter the main Hot 100 chart. It was additionally certified gold in Australia, Brazil, New Zealand, and the United States, and silver in the United Kingdom.

== Live performances and other usage ==
Roan performed a hi-NRG rendition of "Super Graphic Ultra Modern Girl" on the Midwest Princess Tour (2023–2024). A version described by Michael Rietmulder as a "new wavy time warp" was played at Capitol Hill Block Party. The song was also performed at Austin City Limits, Osheaga, Boston Calling, Bonnaroo, Lollapalooza, and Outside Lands in 2024, and Øyafestivalen in 2025. Roan additionally performed "Super Graphic Ultra Modern Girl" at Elton John's Oscar viewing party, run by John's AIDS Foundation.

"Super Graphic Ultra Modern Girl" was featured in the episode "Brandon from College" from the American TV show Laid. It was also featured in the trailers for the third season of The Sex Lives of College Girls and Gabby's Dollhouse: The Movie. The song was featured in the 2025 film Freakier Friday alongside another of Roan's songs, "Hot to Go!" (2023). "Super Graphic Ultra Modern Girl" made a televised appearance when Roan performed it for the Christmas special of Carpool Karaoke in 2024. Additionally, it is a part of the soundtrack of Vale Tudo, a remake of the original Brazilian telenovela that aired in 1988. It serves as the theme for Bella Campos' character Maria de Fátima.

== Credits ==
Credits adapted from the liner notes of The Rise and Fall of a Midwest Princess and Tidal.

- Dan Nigro – producer, songwriter, background vocals, keyboards, engineer, drum programming, synthesizers, guitar
- Kayleigh Rose Amstutz – vocals, background vocals, songwriter
- Annika Bennett – songwriter
- Jonah Shy – songwriter, additional producer, recording, engineer
- Mike Wise – songwriter, producer, keyboards, recording, engineer
- Randy Merrill – mastering
- Serban Ghenea – mixing
- Bryce Bordone – mixing assistance, engineer

== Charts ==
Chart performance for "Super Graphic Ultra Modern Girl"
| Chart (2024) | Peak position |
|---|---|
| US Bubbling Under Hot 100 (Billboard) | 16 |

== Certifications ==
Certifications for "Super Graphic Ultra Modern Girl"
| Region | Certification | Certified units/sales |
|---|---|---|
| Australia (ARIA) | Gold | 35,000^{‡} |
| Brazil (Pro-Música Brasil) | Gold | 20,000^{‡} |
| New Zealand (RMNZ) | Gold | 15,000^{‡} |
| United Kingdom (BPI) | Silver | 200,000^{‡} |
| United States (RIAA) | Gold | 500,000^{‡} |
^{‡} Sales+streaming figures based on certification alone.
