= Casual (song) =

2022 single by Chappell Roan

Single by Chappell Roan

from the album The Rise and Fall of a Midwest Princess
- Released: October 28, 2022
- Genre: Downtempo; pop; dream pop; synth-pop; new wave; pop rock; rock
- Length: 3:52
- Label: Self-released
- Songwriters: Chappell Roan; Dan Nigro; Morgan St. Jean
- Producers: Dan Nigro; Ryan Linvill

Chappell Roan singles chronology
"Femininomenon" (2022)	"Casual" (2022)	"Kaleidoscope" (2023)

Music video
- "Casual" on YouTube

"Casual" is a song by the American singer-songwriter Chappell Roan. It was released as a single on October 28, 2022 independently. It was later released as the fourth single from Roan's debut album, The Rise and Fall of a Midwest Princess, through Amusement Records and Island Records. She wrote the song along with Dan Nigro and Morgan St. Jean, with Nigro credited as producer along with Ryan Linvill. It is a country-influenced downtempo pop, dream pop, synth-pop, new wave, pop rock, and rock ballad with bedroom pop production. Its lyrics discuss casual dating, in particular a situationship between Roan and a love interest who is unwilling to commit.

The song became a sleeper hit in 2024, as one of Roan's seven simultaneously charting songs on the Billboard Hot 100, along with "Good Luck, Babe!", "Hot to Go!", "Red Wine Supernova", "Pink Pony Club", "Femininomenon", and "My Kink Is Karma" in August of that year.

== Background and composition ==
Following the release of Chappell Roan's single "Pink Pony Club" in 2020 and her being subsequently dropped by Atlantic Records, she and producer Dan Nigro began working on "Casual". Much of the song's inspiration would come from a long-distance relationship she began online during the COVID-19 pandemic, where her partner online called her their "dream girl" and would soon make Roan attached to them. Yet, one week later, they texted Roan that they were seeing someone else, leaving her "devastated", and learning shortly thereafter that they had told her friend that their relationship was only casual. In a Rolling Stone interview, she stated that she internally responded to the situation with "'What the fuck do you mean it was casual? We were telling secrets and talking literally every day!'"

“Casual” has been described as a country-influenced downtempo pop, dream pop, synth-pop, new wave, pop rock, and rock song with bedroom pop production. Regarding the song’s main hook, which describes oral sex in a car ("knee-deep in the passenger seat, and you’re eating me out, is it casual now"), Roan revealed she was nervous prior to the release of the song, due to the line's sexually explicit nature.

== Critical reception ==
The song was acclaimed by critics. Jem Aswald for Variety wrote that "Casual" was Roan's "most irresistible" single to date and likened the singer's "stately" delivery to the style of Lana Del Rey. Aswald also noted the song's explicit lyrics. In another positive review for NPR, Stephen Thompson also highlighted the "explicit details" of Roan's song and posited that "all the smartly phrased specifics that make "Casual" sing: the blurry images of future domesticity, the re-contextualized conversation with a relative, the eternal miscalculation of clinging to sex as a stand-in for emotional intimacy."

In two reviews for Pitchfork, Olivia Horn called "Casual" a "high point" of the album and wrote that the song was a "cocktail of sorrow and scorn at a romantic partner," elaborating that the song's outro "turns up the heat and raises the stakes," whereas Jane Bua praised Roan's "biting candor" and opined that the "stacked" vocals in the chorus added "the flavor of a Chicks song."

== Music video ==
The music video for "Casual" was released on March 9, 2023 and was directed by Hadley Hillel. In the video, Roan begins a casual relationship with a siren played by Mika Leshā. For Teen Vogue, Roan described the concept for the video as "Aquamarine, but like, gay".

== Charts ==
Chart performance for "Casual"
Chart (2024–2025)	Peak position
Australia (ARIA)	83
Canada Hot 100 (Billboard)	64
Global 200 (Billboard)	124
Ireland (IRMA)	37
Philippines (Philippines Hot 100)	52
UK Singles (Official Charts)	44
US Billboard Hot 100	59

== Certifications ==
Certifications for "Casual"
Region	Certification	Certified units/sales
Australia (ARIA)	Platinum	70,000^{‡}
Canada (Music Canada)	Platinum	80,000^{‡}
New Zealand (RMNZ)	Platinum	30,000^{‡}
United Kingdom (BPI)	Platinum	600,000^{‡}
United States (RIAA)	2× Platinum	2,000,000^{‡}
^{‡} Sales+streaming figures based on certification alone.
