= Red Wine Supernova =

2023 single by Chappell Roan

Single by Chappell Roan

from the album The Rise and Fall of a Midwest Princess
- Written: 2019
- Released: May 19, 2023
- Genre: Pop; synth-pop; dance-pop; electro
- Length: 3:12
- Label: Amusement; Island
- Songwriters: Chappell Roan; Lisa Hickox; Amy Kuney; Dan Nigro; Annie Schindel
- Producer: Dan Nigro

Chappell Roan singles chronology
| "Kaleidoscope" (2023) | "Red Wine Supernova" (2023) | "Hot to Go!" (2023) |

Music video
- "Red Wine Supernova" on YouTube

"Red Wine Supernova" is a song by the American singer-songwriter Chappell Roan. It was released on May 19, 2023 as the sixth single from Roan's debut studio album, The Rise and Fall of a Midwest Princess. The song began charting in 2024 following the success of "Good Luck, Babe!".

About the song, Roan said, "I needed a campy gay girl song that captured the magic of having feelings for another girl. I packed the song with fun raunchy lyrics that make it feel like a night out flirting with the girl across the bar." A pop, synth-pop, dance-pop, and electro song that evokes new wave, Roan has referred to the song as "the gay girl version" of "Champagne Supernova" by Oasis. In an interview with Australian radio station Joy 94.9, Roan said the song took three years to complete and called it "the ultimate silly pop" song.

The song became a sleeper hit in 2024, as one of Roan's seven simultaneously charting songs on the Billboard Hot 100, along with "Good Luck, Babe!", "Casual", "Hot to Go!", "Pink Pony Club", "Femininomenon", and "My Kink Is Karma".

== Critical reception ==
Callie Ahlgrim of Business Insider named "Red Wine Supernova" the best song of 2023. On their own year-end lists, Capital FM ranked it 14th, Rolling Stone ranked it 18th, NME ranked it 47th, and Pitchfork ranked it 54th.

== Live performances ==
On November 8, 2023, Vevo released a video of Roan performing "Red Wine Supernova" live after being named a DSCVR Artist to Watch for 2024. Roan performed the song on The Late Show with Stephen Colbert on February 15, 2024. On March 1, 2024, Roan performed the song live on MTV Push after being named their artist of the month.

Roan included the song on the setlists of her Naked in North America and Midwest Princess headlining tours. She also included it in her opening set on Olivia Rodrigo's Guts World Tour.

== Accolades ==
Awards and nominations for "Red Wine Supernova"
| Organization | Year | Category | Result | Ref. |
|---|---|---|---|---|
| MTV Video Music Awards | 2024 | Push Performance of the Year | Nominated | |
| BMI Pop Awards | 2025 | Most Performed Songs | Won | |

== Charts ==
Chart performance for "Red Wine Supernova"
| Chart (2024) | Peak position |
|---|---|
| Australia (ARIA) | 63 |
| Canada Hot 100 (Billboard) | 47 |
| Global 200 (Billboard) | 72 |
| Ireland (IRMA) | 27 |
| New Zealand Hot Singles (RMNZ) | 32 |
| UK Singles (Official Charts) | 31 |
| US Billboard Hot 100 | 41 |

== Certifications ==
Certifications for "Red Wine Supernova"
| Region | Certification | Certified units/sales |
|---|---|---|
| Australia (ARIA) | Platinum | 70,000^{‡} |
| Brazil (Pro-Música Brasil) | Platinum | 40,000^{‡} |
| Canada (Music Canada) | Platinum | 80,000^{‡} |
| New Zealand (RMNZ) | Platinum | 30,000^{‡} |
| United Kingdom (BPI) | Platinum | 600,000^{‡} |
| United States (RIAA) | 2× Platinum | 2,000,000^{‡} |
^{‡} Sales+streaming figures based on certification alone.
