= After Midnight (Chappell Roan song) =

2023 song by Chappell Roan

Song by Chappell Roan

from the album The Rise and Fall of a Midwest Princess
- Released: September 22, 2023
- Studio: Amusement (Los Angeles)
- Genre: Pop; disco; neo-disco; dance; funk
- Length: 3:24
- Label: Island; Amusement
- Songwriters: Kayleigh Amstutz; Daniel Nigro; Casey Smith
- Producer: Dan Nigro

Audio
- "After Midnight" on YouTube

"After Midnight" is a song by the American singer and songwriter Chappell Roan from her debut studio album, The Rise and Fall of a Midwest Princess (2023). It became available as the album's third track on September 22, 2023, when it was released by Island and Amusement Records. Roan wrote "After Midnight" with Casey Smith and the song's producer, Dan Nigro. It is a pop, disco, neo-disco, dance, and funk track with lyrics about nightlife that feature themes of bisexuality.

Some music critics praised "After Midnight" as catchy and for its sexually suggestive lyrics, while others considered it unremarkable. Commercially, the track reached number 22 on the US Bubbling Under Hot 100 chart and received gold certifications in Australia, Brazil, New Zealand, and the United States. Roan included "After Midnight" in the set lists of the Midwest Princess Tour (2023–2024) and the Visions of Damsels & Other Dangerous Things Tour (2025–2026), and performed it at several music festivals throughout 2024 and 2025.

== Background and release ==
Chappell Roan left her hometown in Willard, Missouri, and moved to Los Angeles in 2018 to pursue a career as a singer; she met the producer Dan Nigro there and they started collaborating by the end of 2020. In 2023, he launched his Island Records imprint, Amusement Records, and signed her as the first artist on the label. Nigro produced every track on Roan's debut studio album, The Rise and Fall of a Midwest Princess; it was inspired by her life in both the Western United States and the Midwestern United States. "After Midnight" is the third track on the album, which was released on September 22, 2023. In the United States, the song reached number 22 on the Bubbling Under Hot 100 chart dated August 24, 2024. "After Midnight" received gold certifications in Australia, Brazil, New Zealand, and the United States, and a silver certification in the United Kingdom. In March 2025, the Official Charts Company revealed that it was Roan's tenth-biggest song in the United Kingdom based on streams and digital downloads.

== Production and composition ==
Roan wrote "After Midnight" with Nigro and Casey Smith; the former two contributed background vocals. Nigro recorded the track at Amusement Studios in Los Angeles, assisted by Austen Healey. Serban Ghenea provided audio mixing, while Bryce Bordone worked as the mixing engineer. "After Midnight" was mastered by Randy Merrill at Sterling Sound Studios in Edgewater, New Jersey. Nigro additionally provided drum programming and played guitar, keyboards, percussion, and synthesizers. Musicians who played instruments include Sterling Laws (drums) and Jared Solomon (bass guitar).

"After Midnight"
A sample of "After Midnight", a pop, disco, neo-disco, dance, and funk song that features Roan's whistle register.

"After Midnight" is three minutes and twenty-four seconds long. It is a sensual disco, neo-disco, dance, funk, and pop song, where Roan sings in the whistle register. Roan was inspired to write "After Midnight" after moving to Los Angeles at the age of eighteen and realizing that "everything good happens after midnight", which opposes her father's saying: "Nothing good happens after midnight". The song explores themes of sexuality, desire, nightlife, bar fights, and being a "freak in the club".

The lyrics also feature themes of bisexuality: Roan sings in the refrain, "I kinda wanna kiss your girlfriend if you don't mind", before changing the lyrics later in the song to "I kinda wanna kiss your boyfriend if you don't mind". The first verse mentions her internalized shame regarding her sexuality during her adolescence ("My mama said, 'Nothing good happens/ When it's late and you're dancing alone'/ She's in my head saying, 'It's not attractive/ Wearing that dress and red lipstick'"). In the pre-chorus, she expresses her freedom and comfort with her sexuality, despite her family's thoughts on it ("This is what I wanted/ This is what I like/ I've been a good, good girl for a long time/ But baby, I like flirting/ A lover by my side").

== Critical reception ==
Music critics generally praised "After Midnight" for its production and lyrics. Adam Maidment of the Manchester Evening News described it as a "chant-worthy anthem", and Elise Shafer of Variety characterized it as "sexed-up and slick". Eric Bennett of Paste considered it one of the tracks that "highlight how much Roan shines when she's singing freely about sex and desire". Neil Z. Yeung from AllMusic praised the song as catchy for its funky production and heavy use of synthesizers. Screen Rant's Lacey Cohen similarly described "After Midnight" as "catchy, with a steady drum beat and fun lyrics", and listed it at number eleven in a ranking of the album's fourteen tracks. In a less enthusiastic review, Olivia Horn of Pitchfork considered "After Midnight" unremarkable but appreciated Roan's whistle tones as "lovely". Hannah Dobrogosz from BuzzFeed dubbed it "flirty, fun, energetic, freaky, and cheeky", although she did not personally connect with the song; she placed it last in her ranking of the album's tracks.

== Live performances ==
Roan included "After Midnight" in the set list of the Midwest Princess Tour (2023–2024). She also performed it as part of her set list for Olivia Rodrigo's Guts World Tour in 2024, where she served as an opening act. Roan played the track at several festivals in 2024, including Boston Calling, Bonnaroo, Lollapalooza, Osheaga, Outside Lands, and Austin City Limits. She included it in the set list of the Visions of Damsels & Other Dangerous Things Tour (2025–2026), including performances at Primavera Sound and Øyafestivalen in 2025.

== Personnel ==
Credits are adapted from the liner notes of The Rise and Fall of a Midwest Princess.

- Chappell Roan – songwriter, lead vocals, background vocals
- Dan Nigro – songwriter, producer, recording engineer, background vocals, drum programmer, guitar, keyboards, percussion, synthesizers
- Casey Smith – songwriter
- Randy Merrill – mastering engineer
- Serban Ghenea – mixer
- Bryce Bordone – mixing engineer
- Austen Healey – assistant recording engineer
- Sterling Laws – drums
- Jared Solomon – bass guitar

== Chart ==
Chart performance for "After Midnight"
Chart (2024)	Peak position
US Bubbling Under Hot 100 (Billboard)	22

== Certifications ==
Certifications for "After Midnight"
Region	Certification	Certified units/sales
Australia (ARIA)	Gold	35,000^{‡}
Brazil (Pro-Música Brasil)	Gold	20,000^{‡}
New Zealand (RMNZ)	Gold	15,000^{‡}
United Kingdom (BPI)	Silver	200,000^{‡}
United States (RIAA)	Gold	500,000^{‡}
^{‡} Sales+streaming figures based on certification alone.
