= My Kink Is Karma =

2022 single by Chappell Roan

Single by Chappell Roan

from the album The Rise and Fall of a Midwest Princess
- Released: May 6, 2022
- Genre: Synth-pop; indie pop
- Length: 3:42
- Label: Self-released
- Songwriters: Kayleigh Amstutz; Daniel Nigro; Justin Tranter
- Producer: Nigro

Chappell Roan singles chronology
"Naked in Manhattan" (2022)	"My Kink Is Karma" (2022)	"Femininomenon" (2022)

Music video
- "My Kink Is Karma" on YouTube

"My Kink Is Karma" is a song by the American singer Chappell Roan, released on May 6, 2022 as the second single from her debut studio album, The Rise and Fall of a Midwest Princess (2023). A synth-pop and indie pop power ballad, it details Roan’s delight for her ex-partner’s misfortune after a breakup. It was produced by Dan Nigro. The song became a sleeper hit in 2024, as one of Roan's seven simultaneously charting songs on the Billboard Hot 100, along with "Good Luck, Babe!", "Casual", "Hot to Go!", "Red Wine Supernova", "Pink Pony Club", and "Femininomenon".

== Background ==
In an interview with Into, Chappell Roan spoke about the origins of the song: "I've been through some pretty gnarly breakups. I was just sitting in the session and I was like, 'Ah, it feels so nice that my ex is doing horrible!' Which is insanely toxic. The song is toxic! I'm very aware that it's not healthy. But that's how I was feeling that day."

== Composition and lyrics ==
"My Kink Is Karma" is an indie pop and synth-pop power ballad that features synth-laden production and finds Roan relishing in her ex-partner's misfortune, such as watching them "ruin your life", "losing your mind", "dyeing your hair" and "crashing your car." She also claims, "People say I'm jealous but my kink is karma", using the term kink to describe her extreme desire for karmic justice directed at her ex.

== Critical reception ==
"My Kink Is Karma" received strong critical praise. AllMusic's editor Neil Z. Yeung called it a "sardonic, synth-laden" song. Annabel Holman of The Fulcrum listed "My Kink Is Karma" among the best songs from The Rise and Fall of a Midwest Princess, noting its angriness. Writing for David Reviews, Syd Briscoe praised "My Kink Is Karma", calling it a "smooth song", and also applauded the music video for its "gleeful visuals".

BuzzFeed applauded "My Kink Is Karma" as the best song on The Rise and Fall of a Midwest Princess, noting: "Not only is the subject matter satisfying, but the build of the choruses before climaxing in an uproarious celebration is deeply satisfying musically." In 2025, Collider's Jeremy Urquhart placed "My Kink Is Karma" at number three on the list of Roan's best songs ever, praising its hook and chorus. He also wrote: "Pop music rarely cuts this deep. So, yeah, it’s one of her best. [...] This song is something special. Awful, horribly, uncomfortably special, sure, but special nonetheless."

== Music video ==
The music video finds Chappell Roan wearing excessive clown makeup and portraying a character named Karma, who has a stark white heart-shaped face, bright blue eyeshadow, and devil horns. Karma spends the video recovering from a breakup with (and subsequently tormenting) the character Clownie, who is played by James Elinski.

According to Roan, she made the video with her friends from summer camp. She stated, "I didn't want it to be like a beauty shot necessarily. I wanted it to look kind of scary. And I knew I didn't want it to be fully based around sex, which — the song is called 'My Kink Is Karma.' Like, we could have gone the very easy route of being super sexual." Her makeup took inspiration from clowns, the biggest one being the character Him from The Powerpuff Girls.

== In popular culture ==
In October 2024, American pop singer Kelly Clarkson covered the song live on air during The Kelly Clarkson Show. In the cover, Clarkson replaced the phrase "dyeing your hair" from the song's chorus with "dyeing your beard", which was interpreted as a dig against Clarkson's ex-husband, Brandon Blackstock.

In March 2025, Roan discussed the song with Alexandra Cooper on the Call Her Daddy podcast. Roan told Cooper that the song refers to “the worst thing that’s ever happened" to her, but the lesson of the song is that "the pain can fuel something and make something worth watching".

== Charts ==
Chart performance for "My Kink Is Karma"
Chart (2024)	Peak position
Canada Hot 100 (Billboard)	98
US Billboard Hot 100	81

== Certifications ==
Certifications for "My Kink Is Karma"
Region	Certification	Certified units/sales
Australia (ARIA)	Gold	35,000^{‡}
Canada (Music Canada)	Gold	40,000^{‡}
New Zealand (RMNZ)	Gold	15,000^{‡}
United Kingdom (BPI)	Gold	400,000^{‡}
United States (RIAA)	Platinum	1,000,000^{‡}
^{‡} Sales+streaming figures based on certification alone.
