= The Rise and Fall of a Midwest Princess =

2023 studio album by Chappell Roan

Studio album by Chappell Roan
- Released: September 22, 2023
- Genres: Pop; synth-pop; alt-pop; dance-pop
- Length: 49:08
- Labels: Amusement; Island
- Producers: Dan Nigro; Ryan Linvill; Mike Wise

Chappell Roan chronology
School Nights (2017)	The Rise and Fall of a Midwest Princess (2023)

Singles from The Rise and Fall of a Midwest Princess
- 1. "Naked in Manhattan" Released: February 18, 2022; 2. "My Kink Is Karma" Released: May 6, 2022; 3. "Femininomenon" Released: August 12, 2022; 4. "Casual" Released: October 28, 2022; 5. "Kaleidoscope" Released: March 31, 2023; 6. "Red Wine Supernova" Released: May 19, 2023; 7. "Hot to Go!" Released: August 11, 2023

The Rise and Fall of a Midwest Princess is the debut studio album by the American singer-songwriter Chappell Roan, released on September 22, 2023, by Amusement Records, in partnership with Island Records. Developed primarily with producer Dan Nigro, the album was influenced by Roan’s experiences moving from Missouri to Los Angeles and explores themes of love, heartbreak, self-discovery, and sexual identity. Musically, it is a pop, synth-pop, dance-pop, and alt-pop album, alongside elements of bubblegum, disco, electro, and new wave.

The Rise and Fall of a Midwest Princess was met with widespread acclaim and praised by music critics for its bold and emotionally charged nature. Reviews also complimented the album's blend of sharp songwriting, dynamic pop elements, and Roan's vocal performance. It appeared on several year-end best albums lists for 2023 and was nominated for Album of the Year at the 67th Annual Grammy Awards. Roan also became the fifteenth artist in history to receive nominations in all four main General Field categories in a single night, winning for Best New Artist.

Despite limited commercial attention upon its release, the album eventually peaked at number two on the US Billboard 200 and topped album charts in the UK, Ireland and New Zealand. Roan's 2020 single, "Pink Pony Club", which was included on the album, peaked within the top five on the US Billboard Hot 100 and topped the UK Singles Chart in 2025. Roan promoted the album by headlining The Midwest Princess Tour in 2023 and 2024, along with appearances on NPR Music's Tiny Desk Concerts, The Late Show with Stephen Colbert, and The Tonight Show Starring Jimmy Fallon.

== Background and recording ==
Roan was signed to Atlantic Records and living in Los Angeles by 2017, when she released the EP School Nights, a "folk-leaning" project. In 2018, Roan finished an original debut album for Atlantic Records, but it was shelved by the label. She started again from scratch, working with producer Dan Nigro and eventually releasing the singles "Pink Pony Club" and "Love Me Anyway" in April and May 2020, respectively. She released "California" that August, and was dropped by Atlantic Records shortly after. "Pink Pony Club" and "California" were both ultimately included on The Rise and Fall of a Midwest Princess.

Roan moved back to her home state of Missouri, where she worked to save money to move back to Los Angeles, at which point she resumed working with Nigro. In 2023, to support Roan's career and projects, Nigro launched the label Amusement Records. She was the first artist on the label, also working with Island Records to provide support as a major label. The album is inspired by Roan's experience leaving her hometown in Missouri for Los Angeles to pursue a career as a singer. During her journey of self-discovery, Roan navigated love, heartbreak, and embraced her sexual identity – themes that would become central to the record. Roan has stated that The Rise and Fall of a Midwest Princess allowed her to "come to accept [her] queerness". Roan has said that her stage name and persona is a character and compared it to Ziggy Stardust, the character that David Bowie portrayed on his album The Rise and Fall of Ziggy Stardust and the Spiders from Mars (1972), the title of which inspired the title of Roan's album.

Musically, The Rise and Fall of a Midwest Princess has been described as a pop album with elements of synth-pop, folk-pop, new-wave and disco.

== Critical reception ==
Professional ratings
Aggregate scores
Source	Rating
AnyDecentMusic?	7.9/10
Metacritic	85/100
Review scores
Source	Rating
AllMusic	4.5/5 stars
And It Don't Stop	A
DIY	4/5 stars
Dork	5/5 stars
Exclaim!	7/10
The Line of Best Fit	9/10
NME	4/5 stars
Paste	8.4/10
Pitchfork	7.2/10

The Rise and Fall of a Midwest Princess received critical acclaim upon release. According to the review aggregator Metacritic, the album received "universal acclaim" based on a weighted average score of 85 out of 100 from 7 critic scores. Olivia Horn of Pitchfork called the album "a bold and uproarious introduction, buoyed by sturdy songcraft and steely indifference to good taste", also writing that Roan is "blessed with a powerful and versatile voice". Otis Robinson of DIY summarized it as "thoughtful, a little unhinged and entirely contradictory, merging the alt-pop seriousness of Lana Del Rey with the untethered preppy charm of Lorde to go full throttle into messy, emotional fun". Robert Christgau described the album as "shamelessly catchy" and observed that "her demonstrative soprano, captivating tunes, and runaway grooves come to seem inextricable from the encounters and relationships that occasioned them".

NME's Hannah Mylrea dubbed it a "bratty, wacky record of huge pop bangers" as well as an "album that combines Roan's electrifying pop stylings with her funny, irresistible songwriting". Sam Franzini of The Line of Best Fit opined that Roan "is a blazing tour-de-force on her debut album. She tackles every corner of human sexuality, psychology, desire, and lust, all on some of the hookiest choruses of this year". Robert Moran of The Sydney Morning Herald described it as "pop at its most fun and life-affirming". The Rise and Fall of a Midwest Princess has been described as a synth-pop, alt-pop, bubblegum, dance-pop, and electro record.

=== Year-end lists ===
Select 2023 year-end rankings
Publication/critic	Accolade	Rank	Ref.
Billboard	50 Best Albums of 2023	13	
Coup De Main	Best Albums of 2023	3	
Dork	50 Best Albums of 2023	11	
Nylon	10 Best Albums of 2023	8	
PopBuzz	Best Pop Albums of 2023	1	
Rolling Stone	100 Best Albums of 2023	12	
The A. V. Club	27 Best Albums of 2023	2	
The Alternative	Top 55 Albums of 2023	5	
The Skinny	The Skinny's Albums of 2023	19	
TIME	10 Best Albums of 2023	4	

Select 2024 year-end rankings
Publication/critic	Accolade	Rank	Ref.
And It Don't Stop	2024 Dean's List	9	
Time Out	The Best Albums of 2024	2	

== Commercial performance ==
At the time of its release in September 2023, the album was not an immediate commercial success, and did not appear on any mainstream charts.

However, the album started to garner a cult following in the months after its release and became regarded as a "sleeper hit" by early 2024, eventually debuting at number 127 on the US Billboard 200 on the chart date April 6, 2024. The album's commercial breakthrough was largely influenced by Roan's supporting act on Olivia Rodrigo's Guts World Tour, her performances at music festivals like Coachella and Governors Ball, and the success of her follow-up single, "Good Luck, Babe!" By June 2024, The Rise and Fall of a Midwest Princess had climbed the charts, peaking at number one in Ireland, New Zealand, the UK, and within the top five on the US Billboard 200 at number two. Subsequently, several of its singles ("My Kink Is Karma", "Femininomenon", "Casual", "Pink Pony Club", "Red Wine Supernova", and "Hot to Go!") entered the Billboard Hot 100 for the first time ever, not charting upon their initial release.

== Accolades ==
Awards and nominations
Organization	Year	Category	Result	Ref.
ARIA Music Awards	2024	Best International Artist	Nominated	
Danish Music Awards	2024	International Album of the Year	Nominated	
Grammy Awards	2025	Album of the Year	Nominated	
Grammy Awards	2025	Best Pop Vocal Album	Nominated	
American Music Awards	2025	Album of the Year	Nominated	
American Music Awards	2025	Favorite Pop Album	Nominated	

== Track listing ==
The Rise and Fall of a Midwest Princess track listing
No.	Title	Writer(s)	Producer(s)	Length
1.	"Femininomenon"	Kayleigh Amstutz; Daniel Nigro	Nigro; Mike Wise^{[a]}	3:39
2.	"Red Wine Supernova"	Amstutz; Lisa Hickox; Amy Kuney; Nigro; Annie Schindel	Nigro; Noah Conrad^{[a]}; Iixa^{[a]}	3:12
3.	"After Midnight"	Amstutz; Nigro; Casey Smith	Nigro	3:24
4.	"Coffee"	Amstutz; Maya Kurchner; Eric Leva; Nigro	Nigro	3:25
5.	"Casual"	Amstutz; Nigro; Morgan St. Jean	Nigro; Ryan Linvill	3:52
6.	"Super Graphic Ultra Modern Girl"	Amstutz; Annika Bennett; Nigro; Jonah Shy; Wise	Nigro; Wise; Shy^{[a]}	3:03
7.	"Hot to Go!"	Amstutz; Nigro	Nigro	3:04
8.	"My Kink Is Karma"	Amstutz; Nigro; Justin Tranter	Nigro	3:42
9.	"Picture You"	Amstutz; Nigro	Nigro	3:07
10.	"Kaleidoscope"	Amstutz	Nigro	3:42
11.	"Pink Pony Club"	Amstutz; Nigro	Nigro	4:18
12.	"Naked in Manhattan"	Amstutz; Nigro; Skyler Stonestreet	Nigro	3:31
13.	"California"	Amstutz; Nigro	Nigro	3:18
14.	"Guilty Pleasure"	Amstutz; Marcus Andersson; Nate Campany; Nigro	Nigro	3:44
Total length:				49:01

Tidal reissue edition bonus tracks
No.	Title	Writer(s)	Producer(s)	Length
15.	"Casual" (demo version)	Amstutz; Nigro; St. Jean	Nigro	2:24
16.	"Casual" (studio live version)	Amstutz; Nigro; St. Jean	Nigro	3:43
17.	"Super Graphic Ultra Modern Girl" (demo version)	Amstutz; Bennett; Nigro; Shy	Nigro	3:21
18.	"Hot to Go!" (demo version)	Amstutz; Nigro	Nigro	3:12
19.	"My Kink Is Karma" (demo version)	Amstutz; Nigro; Tranter	Nigro	3:56
20.	"Picture You" (demo version)	Amstutz; Nigro	Nigro	3:06
21.	"Kaleidoscope" (demo version)	Amstutz	Nigro	3:57
22.	"Guilty Pleasure" (demo version)	Amstutz; Andersson; Campany; Nigro	Nigro	2:40
Total length:				75:27

Note

- ^{^[a]} signifies an additional producer

== Personnel ==
Musicians

- Kayleigh Amstutz – lead vocals (all tracks), background vocals (tracks 3, 4, 6, 7, 9, 14)
- Dan Nigro – background vocals (1–7, 9, 14), bass guitar (1, 2, 4, 5, 10, 12), guitar (1–3, 6, 8, 9), programming (1), Korg MS-20 (1), drum programming (2, 7, 9, 14), acoustic guitar (4, 9, 14), piano (4, 10), keyboards (6, 13), Moog (7, 14), drums (9, 14), Mellotron (10), Juno-60 (14)
- Emily Williams – background vocals (1)
- Mike Wise – programming (1), keyboards (6)
- Paul Cartwright – strings (1); viola, violin (9, 10, 13)
- Cara Salimando – background vocals (2)
- Giana Shabestari – background vocals (2)
- Sterling Laws – drums (3, 6, 7, 13)
- Jared Solomon – bass guitar (3)
- Sam Stewart – guitar (4, 7, 11)
- Ryan Linvill – flute (4), bass guitar (8), drum programming (9, 12), saxophone (9), programming (11), horn arrangement (13)
- Arianna Powell – acoustic guitar (4)
- Kathleen – background vocals (11)
- Benjamin Romans – piano (11)
- Danny Ward – French horn (13)
- Erick Serna – guitar (13)
- Ido Meshulam – trombone (13)
- Austin Drake – trumpet (13)
- Julian Dessler – trumpet (13)

Technical

- Randy Merrill – mastering
- Mitch McCarthy – mixing (1, 4, 7, 11–13)
- Serban Ghenea – mixing (2, 3, 6, 8)
- Michael Coleman – mixing (5)
- Nathan Phillips – mixing (9)
- Tom Elmhirst – mixing (10)
- Geoff Swan – mixing (14)
- Daniel Nigro – engineering
- Mike Wise – engineering (1)
- Noah Conrad – engineering (2)
- Chris Kasych – engineering (4)
- Ryan Linvill – engineering (5, 9)
- Jonah Shy – engineering (6)
- Bryce Bordone – mix engineering (3, 8), mixing assistance (2, 6)
- Austen Healey – engineering assistance (2, 3, 7, 9, 10, 14)

Credits adapted from album liner notes.

== Charts ==
=== Weekly charts ===
2023 weekly chart performance for The Rise and Fall of a Midwest Princess
Chart (2023)	Peak position
US Heatseekers Albums (Billboard)	3
US Top Album Sales (Billboard)	33

2024—2025 weekly chart performance for The Rise and Fall of a Midwest Princess
Chart (2024–2025)	Peak position
Argentine Albums (CAPIF)	3
Australian Albums (ARIA)	3
Austrian Albums (Ö3 Austria)	12
Belgian Albums (Ultratop Flanders)	3
Belgian Albums (Ultratop Wallonia)	15
Canadian Albums (Billboard)	3
Croatian International Albums (HDU)	2
Danish Albums (Hitlisten)	26
Dutch Albums (Album Top 100)	2
Finnish Albums (Suomen virallinen lista)	19
French Albums (SNEP)	32
German Albums (Offizielle Top 100)	10
Greek Albums (IFPI)	5
Hungarian Albums (MAHASZ)	15
Icelandic Albums (Tónlistinn)	13
Irish Albums (Official Charts)	1
Lithuanian Albums (AGATA)	24
New Zealand Albums (RMNZ)	1
Norwegian Albums (VG-lista)	18
Polish Albums (ZPAV)	51
Portuguese Albums (AFP)	9
Scottish Albums (Official Charts)	1
Spanish Albums (Promusicae)	14
Swedish Albums (Sverigetopplistan)	20
Swiss Albums (Schweizer Hitparade)	16
UK Albums (Official Charts)	1
US Billboard 200	2

=== Year-end charts ===
Year-end chart performance
Chart (2024)	Position
Australian Albums (ARIA)	14
Austrian Albums (Ö3 Austria)	48
Belgian Albums (Ultratop Flanders)	50
Canadian Albums (Billboard)	29
Croatian International Albums (HDU)	17
Dutch Albums (Album Top 100)	50
German Albums (Offizielle Top 100)	95
Global Albums (IFPI)	12
Icelandic Albums (Tónlistinn)	52
New Zealand Albums (RMNZ)	5
Portuguese Albums (AFP)	41
Spanish Albums (PROMUSICAE)	95
Swiss Albums (Schweizer Hitparade)	78
UK Albums (OCC)	6
US Billboard 200	18

2025 year-end chart performance for The Rise and Fall of a Midwest Princess
Chart (2025)	Position
Australian Albums (ARIA)	17
Austrian Albums (Ö3 Austria)	57
Belgian Albums (Ultratop Flanders)	38
Belgian Albums (Ultratop Wallonia)	188
Canadian Albums (Billboard)	12
Dutch Albums (Album Top 100)	58
French Albums (SNEP)	137
German Albums (Offizielle Top 100)	81
Hungarian Albums (MAHASZ)	100
Icelandic Albums (Tónlistinn)	60
New Zealand Albums (RMNZ)	15
Spanish Albums (PROMUSICAE)	85
Swedish Albums (Sverigetopplistan)	77
UK Albums (OCC)	13
US Billboard 200	10

== Certifications and sales ==
Certifications
Region	Certification	Certified units/sales
Australia (ARIA)	Gold	35,000^{‡}
Belgium (BRMA)	Gold	10,000^{‡}
Brazil (Pro-Música Brasil)	Gold	20,000^{‡}
Canada (Music Canada)	Platinum	80,000^{‡}
Denmark (IFPI Danmark)	Platinum	20,000^{‡}
France (SNEP)	Gold	50,000^{‡}
New Zealand (RMNZ)	3× Platinum	45,000^{‡}
Poland (ZPAV)	Gold	15,000^{‡}
Spain (Promusicae)	Gold	20,000^{‡}
United Kingdom (BPI)	2× Platinum	600,000^{‡}
United States (RIAA)	2× Platinum	2,000,000^{‡}
^{‡} Sales+streaming figures based on certification alone.

== Release history ==
Release dates and formats
Region	Date	Format	Label	Ref.
Various	September 22, 2023	CD; digital download; LP; streaming	Amusement; Island	
Various	September 20, 2024	Cassette	Amusement; Island	

== See also ==
- List of number-one albums from the 2020s (New Zealand)
- List of number-one albums of 2024 (Ireland)
- List of UK Albums Chart number ones of the 2020s
