= Amusement Records =

Independent record label founded in 2023

- Founded: 2023
- Founder: Dan Nigro
- Genre: Pop music
- Official website: https://www.amusement-records.com/

Amusement Records is an independent record label run by Dan Nigro. Originally founded to provide a venue for Chappell Roan after Atlantic Records dropped her as a client in 2020, the imprint focuses on pop. In May 2026, Devon Again joined Amusement as its second artist. Both Again and Roan are supported by subsidiary companies of major label Universal Music Group, which signed an exclusivity agreement with Amusement in 2025.

== History ==
Shortly after the release of "Pink Pony Club" in April 2020, Chappell Roan was released by Atlantic Records. The label had resisted the new song—which she wrote with Dan Nigro—as a deviation from Roan's previous work, delaying its release for a year. Roan continued to work with Nigro and released individual singles independently throughout 2022, including "Femininomenon", "My Kink Is Karma", and "Naked in Manhattan". Nigro himself rose to some prominence in 2021 as the co-writer and producer of Olivia Rodrigo's Sour. Roan also opened for Rodrigo during the Sour Tour in 2022.

Nigro created Amusement Records as a venue for Roan. The label was founded and funded independently, but Nigro and Roan sought a major label partner with greater resources. After meeting with multiple labels, they chose Island Records. The name for the label comes from a quote from Goodfellas, where Joe Pesci's character asks "do I amuse you?" Nigro spoke about expansion plans as being about "finding the person I want to invest 300 days of my time with. It’s not simply finding an artist that I like and thinking that they’re great."

In 2025, Amusement entered into a partnership with Universal Music Group (UMG), allowing them first rights to co-sign the label's clients. The deal would also allow Amusement's clients access to any subsidiary label of UMG. Devon Again became Amusement's second signed artist in May 2026, in a deal with UMG's Interscope Records. Again's primary producer Jon Buscema joined Amusement in January 2026 in a deal with Sony Music Publishing.

== Signees ==
=== Artists ===
- Chappell Roan (in deal with UMG's Island Records)
- Devon Again (in deal with UMG's Interscope Records)

=== Writers ===
- Jon Buscema (in deal with Sony Music Publishing)
