= Naked in North America Tour =

2023 concert tour by Chappell Roan

Naked in North America
- Tour by Chappell Roan
- Promotional poster for the tour
- Location: North America
- Start date: February 15, 2023
- End date: March 15, 2023
- Legs: 1
- No. of shows: 20

Chappell Roan concert chronology
- Naked in North America Tour (2023); The Midwest Princess Tour (2023–2024)

The Naked in North America Tour was the debut concert tour by American singer and songwriter Chappell Roan. The tour began on February 15, 2023, at the Crescent Ballroom in Phoenix, and concluded on March 15 at the Fonda Theatre in Los Angeles.

== Background ==
Prior to the tour, Roan had been the opener for numerous tours, including Olivia Rodrigo's Sour Tour and Fletcher's Girl of My Dreams Tour.

== Opening acts ==
Roan had local drag queens open each of the tour dates.

== Critical reception ==
The tour received positive reviews overall.

Writing for Salt Lake Magazine, John Nelson wrote "Roan transformed the Soundwell into the Pink Pony Club, a good natured, energetic space where people gathered to celebrate campy burlesque". Trisha Dasgupta of The Daily Texan wrote "Standing in front of silver streamers and sparkly paper hearts, Roan brought a dreamy presence to the venue, captivating the audience with powerful vocals. With a knack for sarcastic lyricism and biting imagery, Roan's lively dance moves brought her songs to life".

Chloe Postlewaite for The Vanderbilt Hustler said "The audience sang along as she transitioned into "Love Me Anyway", followed by "Feminominon". Roan's electric energy continued throughout the concert, matching the sparkly tinsel and disco balls lining the stage behind her" and "Roan's performance, combined with the engaging and creative drag opening, made her concert an unforgettable night". Writing for The Chicago Maroon, Sofia Hrycyszyn and Lainey Gregory wrote "Despite the beautiful voice on her records, Chappell Roan is one of those rare artists whose vocals are even better live".

== Tour dates ==
List of 2023 concerts, showing date, city, country, and venue
Date	City	Country	Venue
February 15	Phoenix	United States	Crescent Ballroom
February 18	Dallas	United States	House of Blues Cambridge Room
February 19	Houston	United States	House of Blues Bronze Peacock
February 20	Austin	United States	The Parish
February 22	Atlanta	United States	Vinyl
February 23	Nashville	United States	Basement East
February 25	Philadelphia	United States	The Foundry at the Fillmore
February 26	Washington, D.C.	United States	Black Cat
February 28	New York City	United States	Webster Hall
March 1	Boston	United States	The Sinclair
March 3	Toronto	Canada	Velvet Underground
March 4	Columbus	United States	A&R Music Bar
March 5	Chicago	United States	Subterranean
March 6	Springfield	United States	Gillioz Theatre
March 8	Denver	United States	Marquis Theater
March 9	Salt Lake City	United States	Soundwell
March 11	Seattle	United States	Madame Lou's
March 12	Portland	United States	Doug Fir Lounge
March 14	San Francisco	United States	August Hall
March 15	Los Angeles	United States	The Fonda Theatre
