= Femininomenon =

2022 single by Chappell Roan

Single by Chappell Roan

from the album The Rise and Fall of a Midwest Princess
- Released: August 12, 2022
- Genre: New wave; club
- Length: 3:39
- Label: Self-released
- Songwriters: Kayleigh Amstutz; Daniel Nigro
- Producers: Nigro; Mike Wise

Chappell Roan singles chronology
"My Kink Is Karma" (2022)	"Femininomenon" (2022)	"Casual" (2022)

Audio
- “Femininomenon” on YouTube

"Femininomenon" (/ˌfɛmənɪˈnɒmɪnən/ FEM-ə-nih-NOM-ih-nən; a portmanteau of feminine and phenomenon) is a song by the American singer Chappell Roan, released on August 12, 2022 as the third single from her debut studio album, The Rise and Fall of a Midwest Princess (2023). Produced by Dan Nigro and Mike Wise, "Femininomenon" is a new wave and club track with electroclash influences and alt-pop and dance-pop elements. The song became a sleeper hit in 2024, as one of Roan's seven simultaneously charting songs on the Billboard Hot 100, along with "Good Luck, Babe!", "Casual", "Red Wine Supernova", "Hot to Go!", "Pink Pony Club", and "My Kink Is Karma".

== Background ==
Chappell Roan worked with Dan Nigro on the song, writing sections on different days and piecing them together. In an interview with Earmilk, she stated "I've been dreaming of releasing a song like this my whole career. It took years to build up the confidence to even sing in that style." Roan added, "I always try to push myself and how I write pop music. I want to see if I can get away with being as ridiculous as I possibly can. I wanted a dance song. Something people could do drag to. A Queer anthem that had a sad undertone of what really happened to me, but with a beat."

Speaking with Cherwell, Roan described the song as a "slumber party pop". When asked about the song's meaning, Roan said, "It's about the confusion I have in relation to my sexual relationships with men. Something is not connecting. I feel like every man I've been with is never satisfying. With a woman, it's easy and different and wonderful. It's a phenomenon. It's a queer song – hidden in there...It's a phenomenon that this magical, perfect scenario somewhere out there exists, and it's probably a woman in my case."

== Composition ==
“Femininomenon” has been described as a new wave and club song with electroclash influences and alt-pop and dance-pop elements. The song opens with production consisting of strings and piano, as Chappell Roan reflects on an ex-partner who could not satisfy her. Before each chorus, she gradually increases the melodrama in tone and demands for a song to be played "with a fucking beat". During the chorus, the sound of a dirt bike revving is used in the background, before synthesizers are played. In the spoken-word bridge, Roan encourages women in a similar situation as her ("Ladies, you know what I mean, and you know what you need!").

== Critical reception ==
Emily Treadgold of Earmilk remarked "the song somehow goes in a million different ways but fits together so well" and "It's all so fun and loud but so intricate." Reviewing The Rise and Fall of a Midwest Princess for AllMusic, Neil Z. Yeung wrote the song "perfectly captures the album's ethos as it transforms from a sweet, string-laden ballad into a pulse-pounding empowerment anthem punctuated by a mid-song pep talk and hilariously escalating adlibs". Hannah Mylrea of NME commented the song as having a "serious earworm of a chorus." Olivia Horn of Pitchfork called it "a Frankenstein's monster that splices stacked vocals à la Lorde, ad libs à la Kesha, a synth that sounds like a groan tube, and the inane lyric 'Get it hot like Papa John!'—perhaps the pizza franchise's biggest pop crossover moment since they plastered Taylor Swift's face on their boxes."

== In popular culture ==
During the 2024 United States presidential election campaign, Vice President Kamala Harris used "Femininomenon" as a campaign song, posting a montage of photos of herself on the social media platform X, with the song audio playing and captioned "what we really need is a Femininomenon". Harris's post also went viral on TikTok, acquiring 4.8 million likes and nearly 30,000 comments in less than 24 hours.

In 2025, Sadie Dupuis of Speedy Ortiz released a mashup, which fused "Femininomenon" with "Killer Bee" by the American indie rock band Menomena.

"Femininomenon" was used in the trailer for M3GAN 2.0 (2025) alongside Britney Spears' "Oops!… I Did it Again" (2000).

== Charts ==
Chart performance for "Femininomenon"
Chart (2024)	Peak position
Canada Hot 100 (Billboard)	69
US Billboard Hot 100	66

== Certifications ==
Certifications for "Femininomenon"
Region	Certification	Certified units/sales
Australia (ARIA)	Gold	35,000^{‡}
Canada (Music Canada)	Platinum	80,000^{‡}
New Zealand (RMNZ)	Platinum	30,000^{‡}
United Kingdom (BPI)	Gold	400,000^{‡}
United States (RIAA)	Platinum	1,000,000^{‡}
^{‡} Sales+streaming figures based on certification alone.
