= Hot to Go! =

2023 single by Chappell Roan

Single by Chappell Roan

from the album The Rise and Fall of a Midwest Princess
- Released: August 11, 2023
- Recorded: 2023
- Genre: Synth-pop; electropop; indie pop; dance-pop; dance
- Length: 3:04
- Label: Island; Amusement
- Songwriters: Kayleigh Amstutz; Daniel Nigro
- Producer: Nigro

Chappell Roan singles chronology
"Red Wine Supernova" (2023)	"Hot to Go!" (2023)	"Good Luck, Babe!" (2024)

Music video
- "Hot to Go!" on YouTube

Audio sample
- file; help

"Hot to Go!" (stylized in all caps) is a song by the American singer and songwriter Chappell Roan, from her debut studio album, The Rise and Fall of a Midwest Princess (2023). It was released through Island Records and Amusement Records on August 11, 2023, as the album's seventh and final single. She co-wrote the track with its producer Dan Nigro. "Hot to Go!" is a synth-pop, electropop, indie pop, dance-pop, and dance track taking influence from electroclash. Described as a queer cheer song similar to the Village People's "Y.M.C.A.", it was inspired by Roan's childhood dream of becoming a cheerleader.

The song enjoyed acclaim upon its release for its musical composition and its story, which describes a woman wishing to have sex with another woman. Its accompanying dance, which consists of spelling out the song's title using a person's arms, went viral on social media, with videos of large festival crowds performing it. It was seen by some as norm-defying within the mainstream music industry. "Hot to Go!" drew commercial success months after its release. The song became a sleeper hit in 2024, charting within the top ten in Ireland and the United Kingdom as well as the top 20 in Australia, Canada, New Zealand, and the United States.

== Background and writing ==
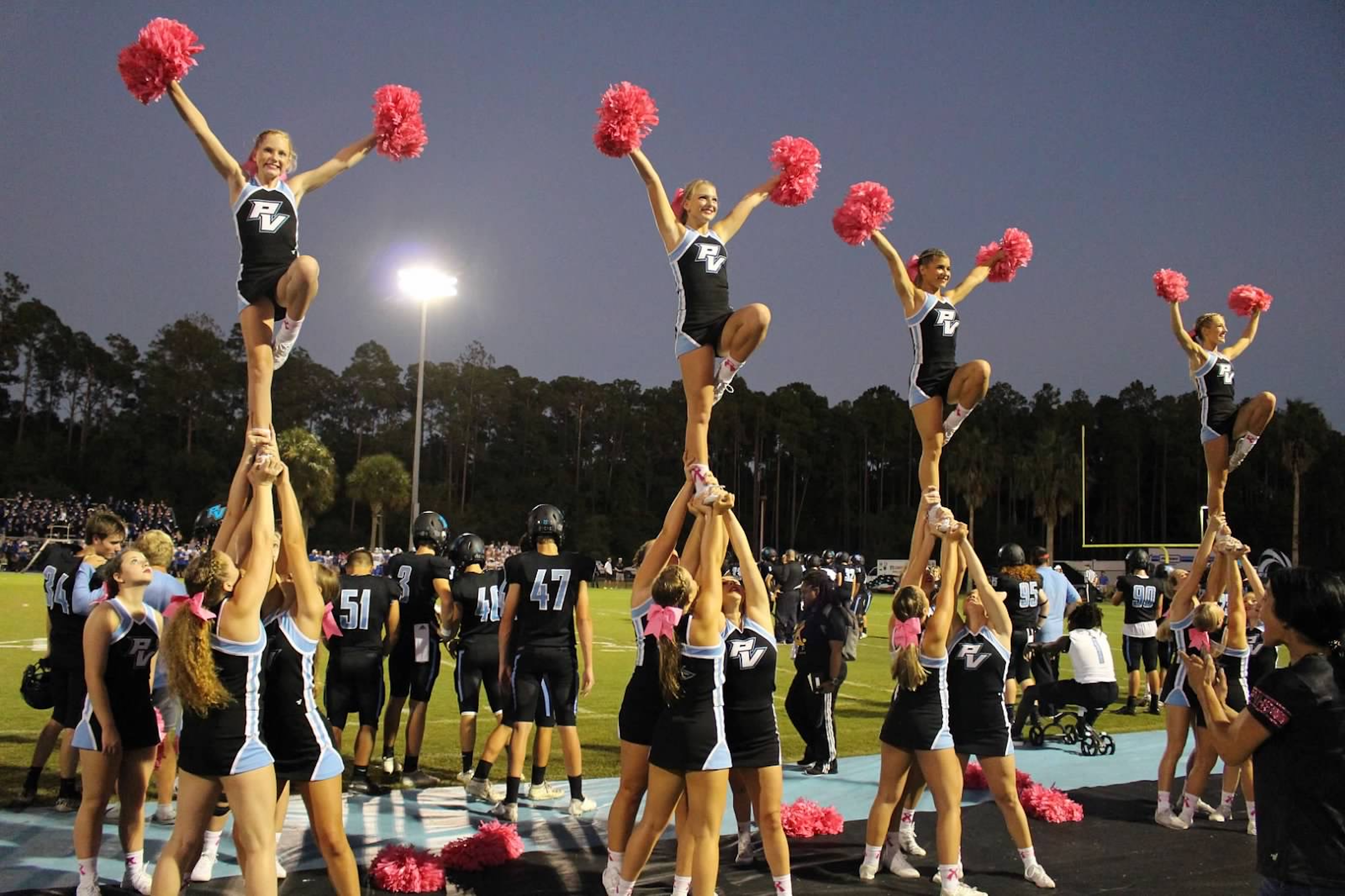
The activity of cheerleading is a main theme in "Hot to Go!", with Roan stating that the song was made to fulfill her childhood dream of becoming a cheerleader.

Roan wrote the song two weeks before the start of her 2023 Naked in North America Tour. She expressed that she intended for the song to be "silly" to satisfy her inner child, stating to Capital Buzz that satisfying her inner child included "wan[ting] to play dress up all the time and dance and be obnoxious." In an interview with Vanity Fair, Roan stated that she wrote the song to fulfill her childhood dream of becoming a cheerleader, basing the song off an American high school cheerleader chant. Roan stated that she did not apply to become a cheerleader during her high school years because "I always thought they were just so cool and so hot... they were just so sassy at my school. I never had the confidence to try out... I didn't belong." Roan, who describes herself as a "huge fan of audience participation", was also inspired by a video of Queen performing "Radio Ga Ga" during Live Aid at Wembley Stadium, London. She later described the song as "like the 'Y.M.C.A.' but gayer".

== Composition ==
“Hot to Go!” is a synth-pop, electropop, indie pop, dance-pop, and dance track with electroclash influences composed in the key of F-sharp major. In an analysis by The Line of Best Fit's Sam Franzini, "Hot to Go!" describes the story of Roan "serv[ing] herself up on a platter, happy to be feasted upon and even relishing the opportunity to be lusted after... simulating the mind-bending obsession one can submit to in the presence of a hot person." The song's instrumentation features synthesizers, with the lyrics teaching a dance to the song and telling her future lovers that she is ready and waiting to spend time with them. Despite the song being about how "I want[ed] people to call me hot" according to Roan, she stated that outside of her stage name, "I still don't want to be called hot. It's so weird... people take it literally. It manifests in ways of, I feel really uncomfortable watching sex scenes."

== Critical reception ==
The song drew largely positive reactions. Stephen Daw of Billboard wrote Chappell Roan "offers up a great impression of a cheer captain" and described the song as "fun", "camp", and "exactly the kind of jam that will have you dancing along in no time." Exclaim!'s Kaelen Bell stated that while on first listen it was "annoying", they admitted that the lyrics were "so-dumb-its-genius... you can't believe hasn't been done before, sung with in-the-red commitment by a songwriter with a clear understanding that the joy of pop music is in its full-blooded surrender to ecstasy and excess." A review from Dork stated that the song represented "Roan’s knack for creating engaging, movement-inducing pop." NME's Hannah Myrlea described the song's chorus as "bratty" and made comparisons to Olivia Rodrigo's "Bad Idea Right?". DIY's Otis Robinson wrote that the song was able to "infus[e] teen melodrama with queer euphoria to throw confetti in the face of heteronormativity." Autostraddle's Em Win declared the song as a "queerleader anthem".

Critics' Year-End rankings of "Hot to Go!"
Publication	List	Rank	Ref.
Cosmopolitan	The Best Songs of 2024	1	

== Promotion ==
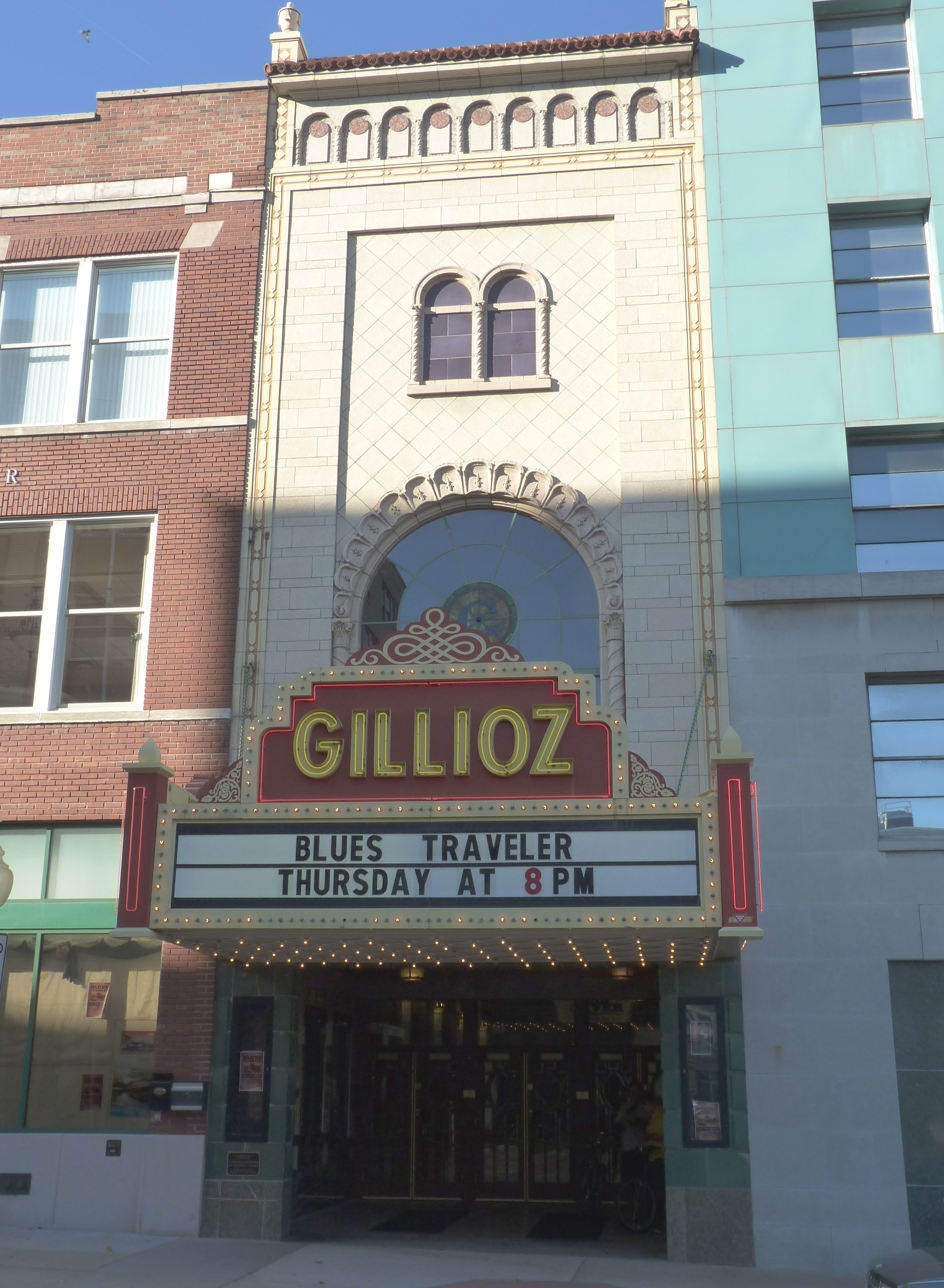
Parts of the music video for "Hot to Go!" were filmed at the Gillioz Theatre, a landmark in Springfield, Missouri.

To promote the song, Roan created an accompanying dance for the song's chorus, spelling out the letters of the song's title with a person's arms; similar to the Village People's "Y.M.C.A." Roan also appeared in promotional posters featuring a phone number; according to Emily Bloch of The Philadelphia Inquirer, the number led to a product distribution call center for Balkamp, a Genuine Parts Company subsidiary.

=== Music video ===
Along with the song's official release, an accompanying music video was released on the same day. It was directed by Jackie! Zhou, and was filmed in various locations around the city of Springfield, Missouri. In an interview given out by Zhou, they described filming as a challenge; particularly because at the same time, Roan was filming a documentary. They stated that "I have to give her the deepest props... it's so hard to go from talking about your duality as an artist... and then being like 'Hot to Go!'... and she's amazing." The music video itself features appearances from her grandparents, with Roan acting as a "bouncy cheerleader" outside filming locations. It also features appearances from local Springfield drag queens, as part of a tradition of Roan including drag queens in her performances. In an analysis by Giselle Libby, they wrote that the music video expresses Roan's "cheerleader fantasy" with a "personal twist", with the video providing a "snapshot of [Roan's] past and present lives, granting fans a deeper look into where she came from and how it impacts her artistry today." Vogue's Alex Jhamb Burns wrote that while Roan currently resides in Los Angeles, the addition of her "groov[ing] around a gas station in a cheerleader’s uniform and mini-golfs in heels" in Springfield displayed that "she hasn’t forgotten her roots."

== Live performances ==
Roan sang "Hot to Go!" as an unreleased single numerous times in live performances. She first sang the song at a Phoenix, Arizona, concert on February 15, 2023, as part of her Naked in North America tour. She continued to sing the song throughout the tour, including in performances in Austin, Boston, Cambridge, Salt Lake City, San Francisco, and Los Angeles throughout the months of February and March 2023. After the song's official release, she performed the song as part of her Midwest Princess Tour, including performances as the opener for Olivia Rodrigo and a performance featuring drag queen Sasha Colby. On August 11, 2024, 1 year after the song's release, she performed the song live at Outside Lands Festival, wearing her costume from the song's music video to celebrate its anniversary. A clip of Roan chastising the VIP crowd members for their lack of participation went viral, with Roan jokingly saying, "It's so weird that VIP thinks they're so way too cool to do this!" and yelling "You're not fun!" before starting the song. 10 days later on August 21, Roan surprised the crowd at longtime friend Rodrigo's Guts World Tour stop in Los Angeles with a duet performance of the song, featuring Rodrigo.

== Accolades ==
Awards and nominations for "Hot to Go!"
Organization	Year	Category	Result	Ref.
MTV Video Music Awards	2024	Best Trending Video	Nominated	
iHeartRadio Music Awards	2025	Favorite Tour Tradition	Nominated	
American Music Awards	2025	Social Song of the Year	Nominated	

== Commercial performance ==
Almost a year after being released, "Hot to Go!" debuted at number 80 on the US Billboard Hot 100 for the week ending June 15, 2024. The song later peaked at number 15 on the chart dated October 5, 2024. Internationally, it peaked within the top ten in Ireland and the United Kingdom. It was certified quadruple platinum in the United States and double platinum in Brazil, Canada, New Zealand, and the United Kingdom.

== Impact ==
The song was parodied in the seventh episode of the fiftieth season of Saturday Night Live, sung by Charli XCX, Heidi Gardner, Ego Nwodim, and Sarah Sherman. The week prior, on November 9, former SNL cast member Will Forte, alongside musician and parodist "Weird Al" Yankovic, performed a cover of "Hot to Go!" during that year's Thundergong! benefit concert. The song's dance went viral on social media, concurrent with her sudden rise in notoriety, in some part due to aerial videos of large music festival crowds performing the dance during her concerts. The song also spawned the viral meme "I hope she plays Hot To Go", a spin-off of the viral The Eras Tour trend, with Roan and artist Olivia Rodrigo recreating it due to its popularity, posting it on Rodrigo's official TikTok page after a surprise performance of the song in Los Angeles on Rodrigo's Guts World Tour. Responses to the meme from other artists include a reproduction of the gag by Beck and St. Vincent and a performance by Vampire Weekend of the song at a Toronto concert. The song was included in the films Freakier Friday and Spa Weekend, as well as the film’s teaser and official trailers.

== Charts ==
=== Weekly charts ===
Weekly chart performance for "Hot to Go!"
Chart (2024–2025)	Peak position
Canada Hot 100 (Billboard)	19
Canada CHR/Top 40 (Billboard)	20
Croatia International Airplay (Top lista)	32
Global 200 (Billboard)	17
Iceland (Tónlistinn)	30
Ireland (IRMA)	5
Lithuania Airplay (TopHit)	144
New Zealand (Recorded Music NZ)	17
Philippines (Philippines Hot 100)	55
UK Singles (Official Charts)	4
US Billboard Hot 100	15
US Adult Contemporary (Billboard)	27
US Adult Pop Airplay (Billboard)	11
US Dance Airplay (Billboard)	22
US Pop Airplay (Billboard)	9

=== Year-end charts ===
2024 year-end chart performance for "Hot to Go!"
Chart (2024)	Position
Canada (Canadian Hot 100)	61
Global 200 (Billboard)	161
UK Singles (OCC)	33
US Billboard Hot 100	53

2025 year-end chart performance for "Hot to Go!"
Chart (2025)	Position
Global 200 (Billboard)	162
UK Singles (OCC)	53
US Adult Pop Airplay (Billboard)	50

== Certifications ==
Certifications for "Hot to Go!"
Region	Certification	Certified units/sales
Brazil (Pro-Música Brasil)	2× Platinum	80,000^{‡}
Canada (Music Canada)	2× Platinum	160,000^{‡}
New Zealand (RMNZ)	2× Platinum	60,000^{‡}
United Kingdom (BPI)	2× Platinum	1,200,000^{‡}
United States (RIAA)	4× Platinum	4,000,000^{‡}
^{‡} Sales+streaming figures based on certification alone.

== Release history ==
Release history and formats for "Hot to Go!"
Region	Date	Format(s)	Label	Ref.
Various	August 11, 2023	Digital download; streaming	Amusement; Island	
United States	August 13, 2024	Contemporary hit radio	Amusement; Island	
