= The Midwest Princess Tour =

2023–2024 concert tour by Chappell Roan

- Tour by Chappell Roan
- Promotional poster for the tour
- Location: Australia; Europe; North America
- Associated album: The Rise and Fall of a Midwest Princess
- Start date: September 20, 2023
- End date: October 13, 2024
- Legs: 6
- No. of shows: 94

Chappell Roan concert chronology
- Naked in North America Tour (2023); The Midwest Princess Tour (2023–2024); Visions of Damsels & Other Dangerous Things Tour (2025–2026)

The Midwest Princess Tour was a concert tour by American singer-songwriter Chappell Roan, launched in support of her debut album The Rise and Fall of a Midwest Princess. Comprising eighty-nine shows, it started on September 20, 2023, at Gillioz Theatre in Springfield, Missouri, and concluded on October 13, 2024, at Zilker Park in Austin, Texas.

== History ==
In May 2023, after the release of "Red Wine Supernova", the eighth single from her then-upcoming debut album The Rise and Fall of a Midwest Princess, Roan announced a tour set to commence in the fall of that year visiting North America, Europe, and Australia.

In January and March 2024, Roan announced a second leg in North America and Europe, respectively. On June 16, Roan announced a third and final leg in the United States, including festival dates at Austin City Limits and All Things Go.

== Special changes ==
- "School Nights" was temporarily added to the set list from October 5 to November 14, 2023. It was also performed in Salt Lake City, Pittsburgh, and Grand Rapids.
- "Bad Romance" was cut from the set list on April 9, 2024.
- Starting on June 9, 2024, "Guilty Pleasure" was replaced by "The Subway".

== Tour dates ==
List of 2023 concerts
Date (2023)	City	Country	Venue
September 20 (Note: The Springfield concert on September 20, 2023, was part of The Midwest Princess Album Experience.)	Springfield	United States	Gillioz Theatre
September 25	Roseville	United States	Goldfield Trading Company
September 27	Salt Lake City	United States	The Depot
September 29	Denver	United States	Ogden Theatre
October 1	Minneapolis	United States	First Avenue
October 3	Milwaukee	United States	The Rave
October 4	Chicago	United States	House of Blues
October 5	Chicago	United States	House of Blues
October 7	Nashville	United States	Brooklyn Bowl
October 8	Indianapolis	United States	Old National Centre
October 10	Detroit	United States	Saint Andrew's Hall
October 11	Toronto	Canada	The Opera House
October 12	Montreal	Canada	Théâtre Fairmount
October 14	Philadelphia	United States	The Fillmore
October 15	Boston	United States	House of Blues
October 17	New York City (Note: Billed as Brooklyn.)	United States	Brooklyn Steel
October 18	New York City	United States	Brooklyn Steel
October 20	Washington, D.C.	United States	9:30 Club
October 21	Washington, D.C.	United States	9:30 Club
October 22	Charlotte	United States	The Underground
October 24	Atlanta	United States	Buckhead Theatre
October 25	Orlando	United States	Beacham Theatre
October 26	Fort Lauderdale	United States	Revolution Live
October 28	New Orleans	United States	Joy Theater
October 29	Houston	United States	House of Blues
October 31	Dallas	United States	House of Blues
November 1	Austin	United States	Scoot Inn
November 3	Phoenix	United States	The Van Buren
November 5	Paradise (Note: Billed as Las Vegas.)	United States	24 Oxford
November 7	Berkeley	United States	UC Theatre
November 9	Portland	United States	Wonder Ballroom
November 10	Vancouver	Canada	Hollywood Theatre
November 11	Seattle	United States	The Showbox
November 14	Los Angeles	United States	The Wiltern
November 24	Sydney	Australia	Liberty Hall
November 25 (Note: The concert in Brisbane on November 25, 2023, was part of the MELT Festival.)	Brisbane	Australia	Brisbane Powerhouse
November 26	Melbourne	Australia	170 Russell
November 27 (Note: The concert in Melbourne on November 27, 2023, was part of SOUNDBOX 2023.)	Melbourne	Australia	The Arts Centre
December 3	Berlin	Germany	FRANNZ Club
December 5	Amsterdam	Netherlands	Melkweg OZ
December 6	Paris	France	Les Étoiles
December 7	London	England	Heaven
December 8	London	England	Heaven

List of 2024 concerts
Date (2024)	City	Country	Venue
February 22	San Diego	United States	SOMA
February 26	Oklahoma City	United States	The Jones Assembly
March 3	Birmingham	United States	Iron City
March 10	Cincinnati	United States	Andrew J. Brady Music Center
March 17	Des Moines	United States	Val Air Ballroom
March 25	South Burlington	United States	Higher Ground Ballroom
April 3	New Haven	United States	College Street Music Hall
April 5	Pittsburgh	United States	Stage AE
April 6	Grand Rapids	United States	The Intersection
April 8	Kansas City	United States	Midland Theatre
April 9	Boulder	United States	Boulder Theater
April 12 (Note: The concerts in Indio on April 12 and 19, 2024, were part of Coachella.)	Indio	United States	Empire Polo Club
April 19	Indio	United States	Empire Polo Club
May 17 (Note: The concert in Gulf Shores on May 17, 2024, was part of the Hangout Music Festival.)	Gulf Shores	United States	The Hangout
May 19	St. Petersburg	United States	Jannus Live
May 20	North Charleston	United States	Firefly Distillery
May 22	Asheville	United States	Rabbit Rabbit
May 23	Richmond	United States	Brown's Island
May 24	Buffalo	United States	Terminal B at the Outer Harbor
May 26 (Note: The concert in Boston on May 26, 2024, was part of the Boston Calling Music Festival.)	Boston	United States	Harvard Athletic Complex
May 28	Cleveland	United States	Jacobs Pavilion
May 29	Madison	United States	The Sylvee
May 30	Maryland Heights	United States	Saint Louis Music Park
June 1	Kalamazoo	United States	State Theatre
June 4	Little Rock	United States	Little Rock Hall
June 5	Tulsa	United States	Cain's Ballroom
June 7	Columbus	United States	KEMBA Live!
June 9 (Note: The concert in New York City on June 9, 2024, was part of the Governors Ball Music Festival.)	New York City	United States	Flushing Meadows–Corona Park
June 11	Norfolk	United States	The NorVa
June 12	Raleigh	United States	Red Hat Amphitheater
June 13	Columbia	United States	Columbia Township Auditorium
June 15 (Note: The concert in Louisville on June 15, 2024, was part of the Kentuckiana Pride Festival.)	Louisville	United States	Big 4 Lawn
June 16 (Note: The concert in Manchester on June 16, 2024, was part of the Bonnaroo Music Festival.)	Manchester	United States	Great Stage Park
July 19 (Note: The concert in Seattle on July 19, 2024, was part of the Capitol Hill Block Party.)	Seattle	United States	Capitol Hill
July 31 (Note: The concert in Chicago on July 31, 2024, was part of the Lollapalooza Aftershows.)	Chicago	United States	The Vic Theatre
August 1 (Note: The concert in Chicago on August 1, 2024, was part of Lollapalooza.)	Chicago	United States	Grant Park
August 2 (Note: The concert in Montreal on August 2, 2024, was part of the Osheaga Festival.)	Montreal	Canada	Parc Jean-Drapeau
August 4 (Note: The concert in St. Charles on August 4, 2024, was part of the Hinterland Music Festival.)	St. Charles	United States	Avenue of the Saints Amphitheater
August 11 (Note: The concert in San Francisco on August 11, 2024, was part of Outside Lands.)	San Francisco	United States	Golden Gate Park
September 13	Manchester	England	Manchester Academy
September 15	Glasgow	Scotland	O_{2} Academy Glasgow
September 17	Dublin	Ireland	Olympia Theatre
September 19	London	England	O_{2} Academy Brixton
September 20	London	England	O_{2} Academy Brixton
September 21	London	England	O_{2} Academy Brixton
September 23 (Note: The concert in Berlin was originally scheduled for August 31 but was moved due to scheduling issues.)	Berlin	Germany	Velodrom
October 1	Franklin	United States	FirstBank Amphitheater
October 2	Rogers	United States	Walmart AMP
October 3	Council Bluffs	United States	Westfair Amphitheater
October 6 (Note: The concerts in Austin on October 6 and 13, 2024, are part of the Austin City Limits Music Festival.)	Austin	United States	Zilker Park
October 13	Austin	United States	Zilker Park

== Canceled dates ==
List of concerts, showing date, city, country, venue, and reason for cancelation.
Date	City	Country	Venue	Reason
September 3, 2024	Paris	France	Bataclan	2024 MTV Video Music Awards rehearsals
September 4, 2024	Amsterdam	Netherlands	Melkweg	2024 MTV Video Music Awards rehearsals
September 7, 2024 (Note: The concert in Berlin on September 7, 2024, was due to be part of Lollapalooza Berlin.)	Berlin	Germany	Berlin Olympic Park	2024 MTV Video Music Awards rehearsals
September 8, 2024 (Note: The concert in Munich on September 8, 2024, was due to be part of the Superbloom Festival.)	Munich	Germany	Munich Olympic Park	2024 MTV Video Music Awards rehearsals
September 28, 2024 (Note: The concerts in New York City on September 28, and in Columbia on September 29, were due to be part of the All Things Go Music Festival.)	New York City (Note: Billed as Queens.)	United States	Forest Hills Stadium	Mental health reasons
September 29, 2024	Columbia	United States	Merriweather Post Pavilion	Mental health reasons
