= Gillioz Theatre =

United States historic place in Missouri

- Gillioz Theater
- U.S. National Register of Historic Places
- U.S. Historic district – Contributing property
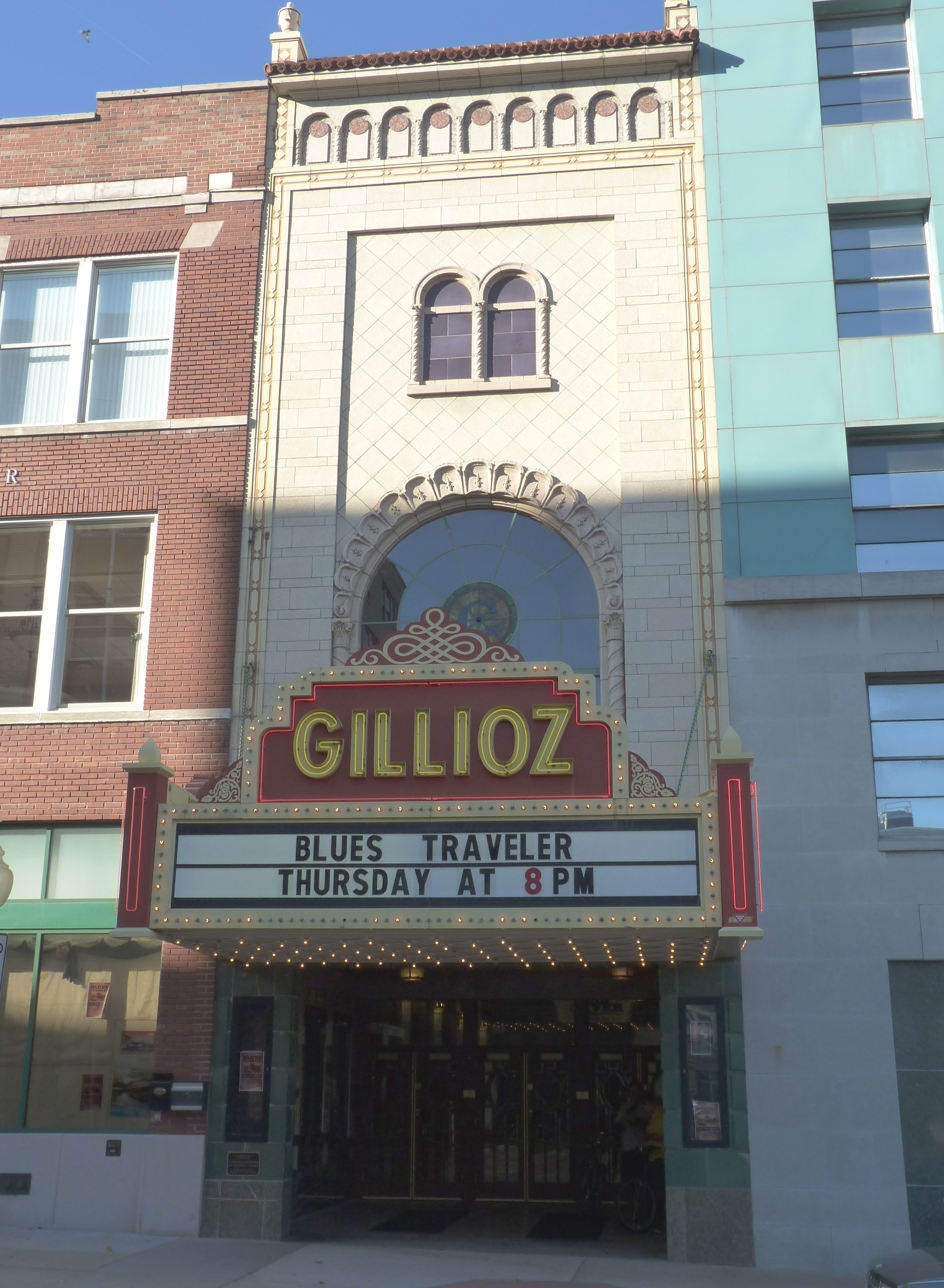
- The newly renovated Gillioz Theatre in the Park Central East Street and the neighboring Fine Arts Building

- Location within Missouri Location within the United States
- Location: 325 Park Central E., Springfield, Missouri
- Coordinates: 37°12′30″N 93°17′20″W
- Area: less than one acre
- Built: 1926
- Architects: Larsen, L.P.; Jacobs, Fred
- Architectural style: Mission/spanish Revival
- NRHP reference No.: 91000887
- Added to NRHP: July 9, 1991

The Gillioz Theatre is a historic theater located at Springfield, Missouri, United States. It was built by M. E. Gillioz of Monett, Missouri. Mr. Gillioz was in the business of building bridges, and the theater was built with steel and concrete. Wood was only used for handrails, doors, and door frames. The original cost of the building was $300,000. Renovation costs totalled approximately $1.9 million.

The theater opened on October 11, 1926. Gillioz managed to secure a 100-year lease on one 16-foot (4.9 m) wide piece of property which bordered on U.S. Route 66, so that the theater could garner patrons who traveled on that historic highway. After many prosperous years, and many not-so-prosperous years, the "Gillioz, Theatre Beautiful" finally offered its last show in the summer of 1980, an opera.

The theater was originally a transition theater, with a Style D Wurlitzer theatre pipe organ (Opus 1411) for silent movies and a stage for live performances, such as vaudeville acts. The organ was sold in 1980 when the theatre closed, and is currently in private hands. A sound system was installed in 1928 with the advent of talkies.

The theatre is mainly a concert venue. It hosts a variety of entertainment such as Dave Chappelle, Elvis Costello, George Clinton, Ben Folds, Shaun Cassidy, Weird Al Yankovich, Parliament Funkadelic, Blue October, Kacey Musgraves, Billy Ray Cyrus and many more. Capacity for general admission is 1,300 and for reserved seating is 1,015.

It was listed on the National Register of Historic Places in 1991. It is located in the Springfield Public Square Historic District.

== Premieres ==
The Gillioz hosted the premieres of three movies:

- 1938 January 14: “Swing Your Lady” with Humphrey Bogart and Penny Singleton
- 1952 June 6: “The Winning Team" with Ronald Reagan
- 1952 July 4: “She’s Working Her Way Through College,” also starring Ronald Reagan

== Stories ==
Elvis Presley passed an afternoon watching a movie at the Gillioz after performing sound checks for an evening show at the nearby Shrine Mosque. Questions of the old theatre being haunted are frequent. Factually, the theatre did have a death on New Year's Eve 1962 when the projectionist died at his post prior to starting a midnight screening. It is a favorite spot for paranormal investigation.

== Renovation ==
The Gillioz is now operated by the Gillioz Center For Arts & Entertainment, a 501c-3 non-profit committed to preserving the space and enhancing the quality of life for people in the Ozarks, visitors and residents alike, through music, comedy, film and education. Restoration began in 1990, and was completed in 2006. The lobby and auditorium were restored to the original 1926 appearance. It is now listed on the National Register of Historic Places. Eighty years after first opening its doors, the Gillioz had a grand reopening in October 2006 known as Encore 2006. The historic Gillioz has experienced a strong resurgence, including being named top event venue by both 417 magazine and the Springfield Newsleader. In 2017 the Gillioz was named a top 5 event venue under 4000 seats by the Academy of Country Music. Other venues listed were the Ryman Auditorium in Nashville Tennessee, Austin City Limits in Austin Texas, the PlayStation Theatre in New York and Hoyt Sherman Theatre in Des Moines Iowa.

== Reagan Center ==
The Gillioz Theatre and the Jim D. Morris Building together are known as the Ronald and Nancy Reagan Center. The Gillioz Theatre was chosen due to Ronald Reagan's theatrical contributions.
