= Naked in Manhattan =

2022 single by Chappell Roan

Single by Chappell Roan

from the album The Rise and Fall of a Midwest Princess
- A-side: "Pink Pony Club"
- Written: 2019–2021
- Released: February 18, 2022
- Genre: Dance-pop; synth-pop; disco
- Length: 3:31
- Label: Self-released
- Songwriters: Kayleigh Amstutz; Dan Nigro; Skyler Stonestreet
- Producer: Dan Nigro

Chappell Roan singles chronology
"California" (2020)	"Naked in Manhattan" (2022)	"My Kink Is Karma" (2022)

Music video
- "Naked in Manhattan" on YouTube

Audio sample
- file; help

"Naked in Manhattan" is a song by the American singer-songwriter Chappell Roan. It was self-released on February 18, 2022. It would later become the lead single from Roan's debut album The Rise and Fall of a Midwest Princess, through Amusement and Island Records. "Naked in Manhattan" was also released as a B-side to Roan’s "Pink Pony Club" on December 16, 2024. She wrote the song with Dan Nigro and Skyler Stonestreet, with Dan Nigro on production. It is a dance, dance-pop, synth-pop, disco-pop, and disco song about sapphic yearning and having a crush on a girl for the first time, drawing comparisons with the feeling of new possibilities after arriving in New York City.

== Background ==
Following the commercially disappointing performance of Roan's previous single "Pink Pony Club" and being dropped by Atlantic Records for being unprofitable, Roan took a two year long break from music before returning with "Naked in Manhattan", a song written the same original year. The song's inspiration drew from her first time having a crush on a girl, who was from New York City. She said in an interview, "This song relates to having a crush on a girl or like a queer relationship at the beginning, because it's similar to the way that New York City makes me feel, which is like, excited and kind of like, wanderlust, and it's the same as a girl." The song's lyrics feature cultural references to the film Mulholland Drive, the character Regina George from Mean Girls, and pop artist Lana Del Rey, whom Roan has expressed an admiration for.

== Critical reception ==
In a review for Earmilk, Emily Treadgold said "Naked In Manhattan" was a showcase of Chappell Roan's amazing ability to "perfectly capture those burgeoning feelings of young love through a queer lens."

Madeline Kinnaird for NPR wrote that "Naked In Manhattan" has lyricism that is "tender" and "nostalgic". She commented on Roan's falsetto, calling it "floating" and that the instrumentation has "delicate, yearning synths".

== Charts ==
Chart performance for "Naked in Manhattan"
Chart (2024)	Peak position
US Bubbling Under Hot 100 (Billboard)	16

== Certifications ==
Region	Certification	Certified units/sales
Australia (ARIA)	Gold	35,000^{‡}
New Zealand (RMNZ)	Gold	15,000^{‡}
United Kingdom (BPI)	Silver	200,000^{‡}
United States (RIAA)	Gold	500,000^{‡}
^{‡} Sales+streaming figures based on certification alone.
