= Good Luck, Babe! =

2024 single by Chappell Roan

Single by Chappell Roan
- B-side: "Read & Make Out" (demo)
- Released: April 5, 2024
- Recorded: January 2024
- Genre: Synth-pop; new wave; dance
- Length: 3:38
- Label: Amusement; Island
- Songwriters: Chappell Roan; Justin Tranter; Dan Nigro
- Producer: Dan Nigro

Chappell Roan singles chronology
"Hot to Go!" (2023)	"Good Luck, Babe!" (2024)	"The Giver" (2025)

Lyric video
- "Good Luck, Babe!" on YouTube

"Good Luck, Babe!" is a song by the American singer-songwriter Chappell Roan, released as a single on April 5, 2024, through Amusement Records and Island Records. Roan wrote the song with Justin Tranter and Dan Nigro, who produced it. A 1980s-influenced power ballad, "Good Luck, Babe!" incorporates synth-pop, new wave, and dance, with elements of baroque pop and soft rock. Its maximalist production consists of pulsing synthesizers and a string section.

Music critics acclaimed Roan's vocals, the production, and the storytelling lyrics. Many publications included "Good Luck, Babe!" in their rankings of the best songs of 2024; NME, The Guardian, and Rolling Stone placed it at number one on their lists. The single became Roan's breakout song and a sleeper hit; it peaked at number four on the Billboard Hot 100 chart. It also reached number one on charts in Ireland and Poland, and reached the top five in Australia, Canada, New Zealand, Singapore, and the United Kingdom. It has been certified platinum or higher in Australia, Belgium, Canada, France, Greece, New Zealand, Portugal, Poland, the United Kingdom, and the United States.

Roan performed "Good Luck, Babe!" at Coachella, The Tonight Show Starring Jimmy Fallon, and the 2024 MTV Video Music Awards, where it was nominated for Song of Summer. The song was nominated for Best Song at the 2024 MTV Europe Music Awards; and for Song of the Year, Record of the Year, and Best Pop Solo Performance at the 67th Annual Grammy Awards in 2025. It won the Brit Award for International Song at the Brit Awards 2025 and topped the Triple J Hottest 100, 2024.

== Release ==
In April 2024, Roan sent an email to fans stating that "Good Luck, Babe!" would be released on April 5, writing that the song is "about wishing good luck to someone who is denying fate". She added that it would be the "first song of the next chapter", following her debut studio album, The Rise and Fall of a Midwest Princess, in September 2023.

Amusement Records and Island Records released the single through streaming and download on April 5, 2024. A lyric video was released on that day. Inspired by early Internet culture imagery, the video includes extensive use of the Comic Sans typeface. Roan expressed reluctance to make a full video, citing burnout and exhaustion from continuous touring and recording. The song was released as a limited-edition 7-inch vinyl on June 28.

== Writing and recording ==
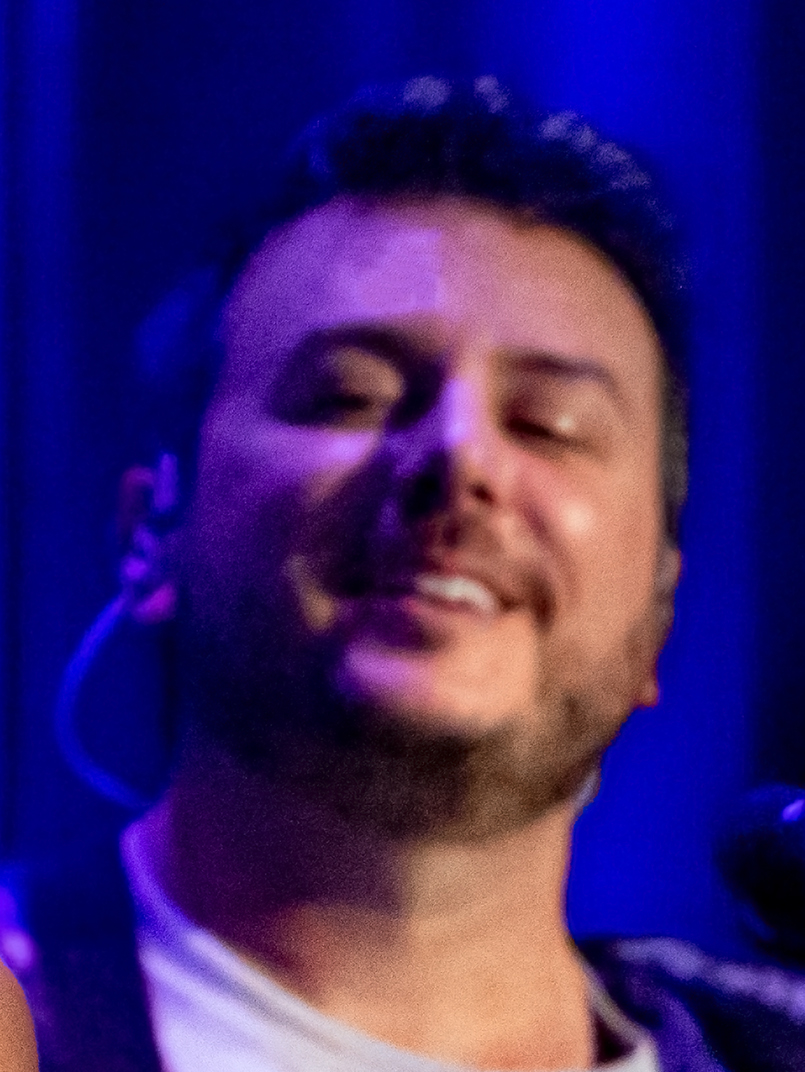
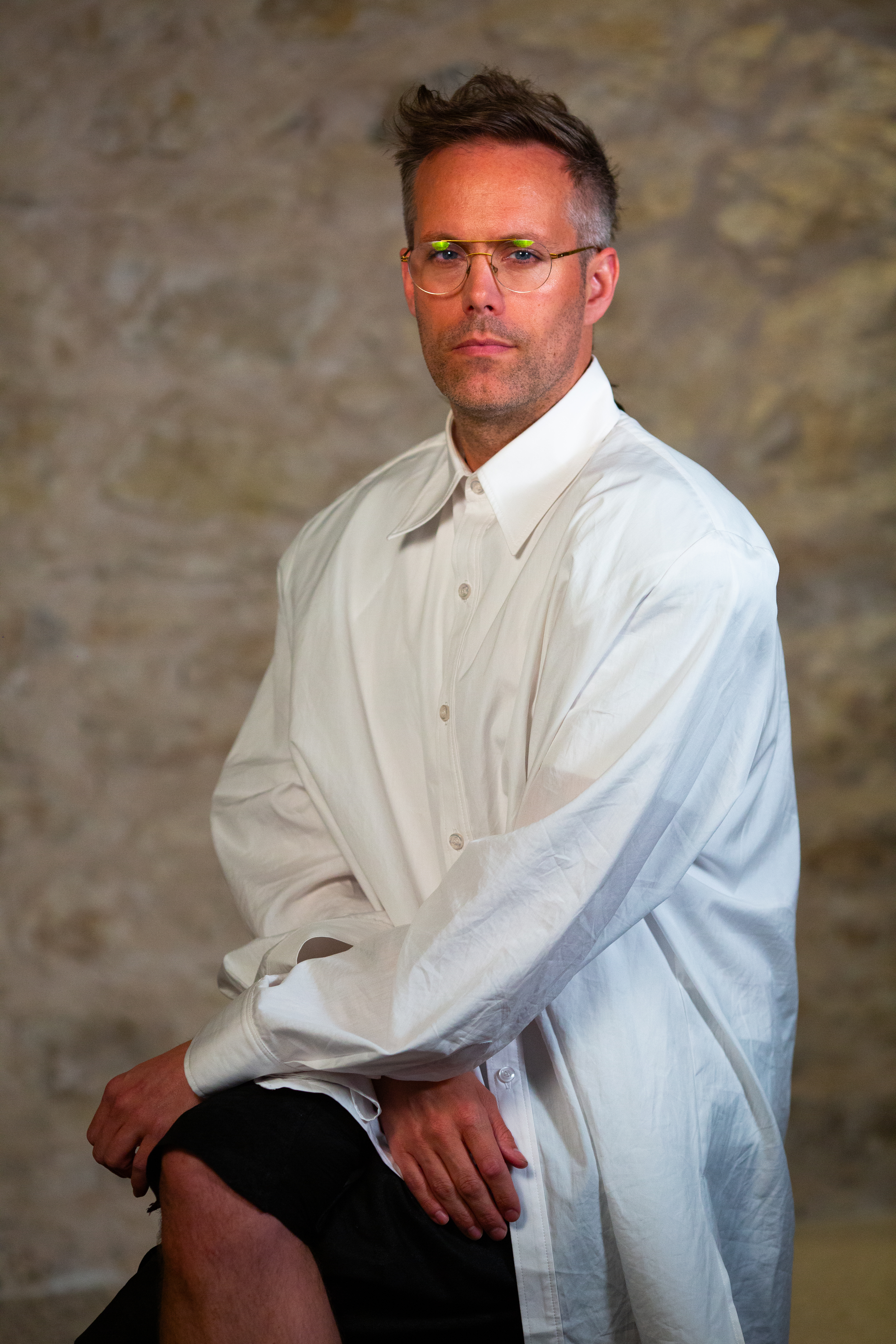
Co-writers Dan Nigro (left) and Justin Tranter (right)

Roan wrote "Good Luck, Babe!" with Justin Tranter and Dan Nigro, stating that she "was just wanting to write a big anthemic pop song", and that it "was a bitch to write". The song originated in November 2022, during the making of The Rise and Fall of a Midwest Princess, as a "scratch idea" titled "Good Luck, Jane!", consisting of just a verse and a chorus. Roan and Nigro recorded a demo, but Nigro said it did not feel right at the time. The two revisited the song a few months later and adjusted the chorus so that Roan sang some words in full voice. Nigro said that Roan wrote the bridge "in like two minutes".

The lyrics are about compulsory heterosexuality, with Roan describing a relationship with a woman who tries to deny her romantic feelings for Roan and women in general. "Good Luck, Babe!" has been described as a pop, synth-pop, new wave, and dance power ballad with elements of baroque pop and soft rock, and '80s new wave synths.

The song is composed in the key of D major. Roan's vocal range spans the low note A_{3} to the high note of F♯_{5}.

The song plays at a tempo of 117 BPM during the verses and slows slightly to 116 BPM during the choruses. At the end of the track, the tempo slows down to around 83.33 BPM. The pitch drops by one semitone, changing the song's key from D major to C♯/D♭ major.

== Critical reception ==
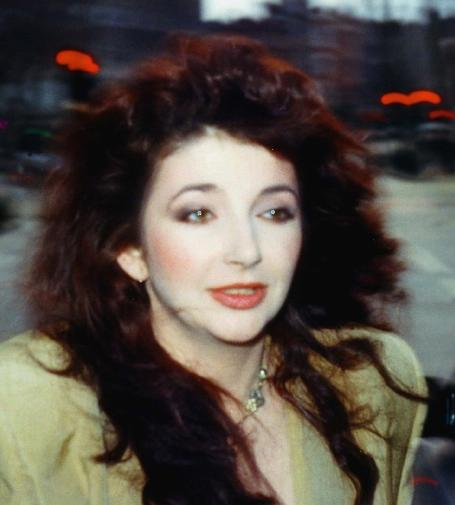
Critics compared "Good Luck, Babe!" to the works of Kate Bush (pictured in 1986).

"Good Luck, Babe!" received acclaim, with many declaring it Roan's breakthrough hit. Critics were particularly enthused by Roan's powerful vocals, observing that it was symbolic of her concurrent ascent in popularity. Sydney Brasil of Exclaim! opined that the song was "a more realized version of her baroque pop vision, both airy and devastating in its delivery". Stephen Daw from Billboard praised the combination of Nigro's production with Roan's vocal performance, writing, "[t]he maximalist production—featuring chunky '80s synths and a multi-piece string section—fuels Roan's octave-jumping voice... As frustration, flirtation and self-confidence ooze from every syllable of Roan's impeccable delivery, it's no wonder why audiences are clamoring for more of the superstar's exceptional artistry". Several commentators drew comparisons of Chappell Roan to the likes of prominent musicians of the 1980s, such as Kate Bush, Wham!, and Cyndi Lauper. Shaad D'Souza of The New York Times compared Roan's vocals to those of Liza Minnelli, positing that the song highlights a theatrical element to how she delivers her narrative lyrics.

Speaking for NPR, Sheldon Pearce chose the track as the best pop song of the year, writing of the refrain: "'You'd have to stop the world just to stop the feeling' is such a monumental read that feels like a gut punch. It's the kind of direct emotional attack that you can't escape even as a bystander". Mary Kate Carr of The A.V. Club similarly praised the songwriting as an improvement from her debut album and "brimming with righteous anger". Other critics praised the vivid storytelling of the bridge; Jason P. Frank of Vulture praised it as a strong case against a current trend of artists omitting a bridge to shorten tracks. Pitchfork named it one of the best songs of the first half of the 2020s. It reached number one on the Australian radio station Triple J's Hottest 100 countdown for 2024.

Critics' mid-year rankings of "Good Luck, Babe!"
Publication	List	Rank	Ref.
Billboard	The 50 Best Songs of 2024 (So Far)	3	
Consequence	100 Best Songs of 2024 (So Far)	7	
Los Angeles Times	The 24 best songs of 2024 so far	N/A	
The New York Times	The 40 Best Songs of 2024 (So Far)	N/A	
Rolling Stone	The Best Songs of 2024 So Far	N/A	
NPR	The best songs of 2024 (so far)	N/A	
The A.V. Club	25 Best Songs of 2024 (So Far)	N/A	

Critics' year-end rankings of "Good Luck, Babe!"
Publication	List	Rank	Ref.
NME	The 50 Best Songs of 2024	1	
The Guardian	The 20 Best Songs of 2024	1	
Rolling Stone	The 100 Best Songs of 2024	1	
The Independent	The 20 Best Songs of 2024	2	
Billboard	The 100 Best Songs of 2024	2	
Business Insider	The Best Songs of 2024	2	
USA Today	10 Best Songs of 2024	2	
Pitchfork	The 100 Best Songs of 2024	3	
Exclaim!	The 20 Best Songs of 2024	4	
Stereogum	The 50 Best Songs of 2024	5	
ELLE	The Best New Songs of 2024	N/A	
Associated Press	Top Songs of 2024	N/A	
Uproxx	The Best Songs of 2024	N/A	

Critics' mid-decade rankings of "Good Luck, Babe!"
Publication	List	Rank	Ref.
Pitchfork	The 100 Best Songs of the 2020s (So Far)	42	

== Commercial performance ==
"Good Luck, Babe!" debuted at number 77 on the Billboard Hot 100 for the week ending April 20, 2024, becoming Roan's first entry on the chart and a sleeper hit. It reached number four on the chart dated September 28, 2024. It was certified six-times platinum in the United States on November 25, 2025, for sales exceeding six million units. It also reached number one on Billboard's Pop Airplay chart and nine on the Adult Pop Airplay chart. On November 29, 2024, it became Roan's first song to reach one billion streams on Spotify, which Roan described as "cuckoo loco" on social media.

== Impact ==
Upon charting on the Billboard Hot 100, Hannah Jocelyn, writing for the publication, posited that the song's overt LGBTQ themes represented a breakthrough for not just Roan's career, but also a wider movement of young LGBTQ pop artists. Natalie Sofia agreed, arguing that chart-topping "queer anthems" are imbued with subtext, blurring the lines between homosexual and heterosexual relationships at the expense of LGBTQ themes. She argued that Roan's inclusion of such themes spoke to her authenticity as an artist. Juliana Tanner of The Michigan Daily echoed such optimism, commending Roan for not leaving any room for ambiguity in her homosexuality despite facing cynicism in the past, and avoiding fetishization of lesbian relationships for male audiences.

== Live performances and cover versions ==
Roan debuted "Good Luck, Babe!" at SOMA San Diego on February 22, 2024, and a few months later it was added to the set list of the Midwest Princess Tour, performing it at her first Coachella set in April 2024. Her first televised performance of the song was in June 2024, when she appeared on The Tonight Show Starring Jimmy Fallon. On September 11, Roan performed the song at the 2024 MTV Video Music Awards. The medieval-themed costuming and production design attracted considerable praise.

In June 2024, Sabrina Carpenter covered "Good Luck, Babe!" as part of a set for BBC Radio 1's Live Lounge; Carpenter had previously shared that she was a fan of the song. Her version charted at number 75 on the UK Video Streaming Chart for the week of July 4, 2024. After sharing an admiration for Roan's music, Kelly Clarkson and Miranda Lambert performed a duet cover version of "Good Luck, Babe!" on The Kelly Clarkson Show in September 2024. "Good Luck, Babe!" has also been covered by various acts including Muna, Franz Ferdinand, the Jonas Brothers, Cxloe, Girl in Red, Sondre Lerche, the cast of Hamilton, Rose Cousins, and Postmodern Jukebox. In December 2024, Filipino singer Sarah Geronimo covered the song on the Philippine variety program ASAP, altering the lyrics to make them heteronormative. The lyric changes went viral, with many Filipinos criticizing the perceived erasure and "censorship" of the song's lesbian themes, exacerbated by the fact that Roan is openly a lesbian.

== Accolades ==
Awards and nominations for "Good Luck, Babe!"
Organization	Year	Category	Result	Ref.
MTV Video Music Awards	2024	Song of Summer	Nominated	
MTV Europe Music Awards	2024	Best Song	Nominated	
Danish Music Awards	2024	International Song of the Year	Nominated	
Triple J	2025	Hottest 100 of 2024	1	
BRIT Awards	2025	International Song of the Year	Won	
Grammy Awards	2025	Record of the Year	Nominated	
Grammy Awards	2025	Song of the Year	Nominated	
Grammy Awards	2025	Best Pop Solo Performance	Nominated	
iHeartRadio Music Awards	2025	Best Lyrics	Nominated	
American Music Awards	2025	Favorite Pop Song	Nominated	

== Personnel ==
Credits adapted from Apple Music.

- Chappell Roan – vocals, songwriter
- Daniel Nigro – producer, recording engineer, programming, background vocals, bass, synthesizer, guitar, percussion, keyboards
- Justin Tranter – songwriter
- Lily Elise – background vocals
- Sterling Mitchell Laws – drums
- Paul Cartwright – violin, viola
- Mitch McCarthy – mixing engineer
- Randy Merrill – mastering engineer

== Charts ==
=== Weekly charts ===
Weekly chart performance for "Good Luck, Babe!"
Chart (2024–2025)	Peak position
Australia (ARIA)	4
Austria (Ö3 Austria Top 40)	8
Belarus Airplay (TopHit)	85
Belgium (Ultratop 50 Flanders)	7
Belgium (Ultratop 50 Wallonia)	7
Canada Hot 100 (Billboard)	4
Canada AC (Billboard)	10
Canada CHR/Top 40 (Billboard)	4
Canada Hot AC (Billboard)	6
Canada Rock (Billboard)	37
Chile Airplay (Monitor Latino)	11
CIS Airplay (TopHit)	31
Croatia International Airplay (Top lista)	3
Czech Republic Singles Digital (ČNS IFPI)	54
Denmark (Tracklisten)	35
Estonia Airplay (TopHit)	4
Finland (Suomen virallinen lista)	40
France (SNEP)	51
Germany (GfK)	18
Global 200 (Billboard)	5
Greece International (IFPI)	12
Hungary (Editors' Choice Top 40)	12
Iceland (Tónlistinn)	10
Ireland (IRMA)	1
Israel (Mako Hitlist)	88
Italy (FIMI)	65
Japan Hot Overseas (Billboard Japan)	14
Latvia Airplay (LaIPA)	1
Latvia Streaming (LaIPA)	8
Lebanon (Lebanese Top 20)	3
Lithuania (AGATA)	11
Lithuania Airplay (TopHit)	27
Luxembourg (Billboard)	16
Malaysia (Billboard)	14
Malaysia International (RIM)	11
Mexico Airplay (Monitor Latino)	17
Netherlands (Dutch Top 40)	28
Netherlands (Single Top 100)	25
New Zealand (Recorded Music NZ)	5
Norway (VG-lista)	12
Philippines (Philippines Hot 100)	8
Poland (Polish Airplay Top 100)	1
Poland (Polish Streaming Top 100)	19
Portugal (AFP)	19
Puerto Rico Anglo Airplay (Monitor Latino) One Flame Remix	12
Romania Airplay (UPFR)	5
Romania Airplay (Media Forest)	1
Romania TV Airplay (Media Forest)	6
Russia Airplay (TopHit)	137
San Marino Airplay (SMRTV Top 50)	4
Singapore (RIAS)	4
Slovakia Singles Digital (ČNS IFPI)	55
Slovenia Airplay (Radiomonitor)	18
South Africa Streaming (TOSAC)	10
Spain (Promusicae)	92
Sweden (Sverigetopplistan)	26
Switzerland (Schweizer Hitparade)	18
United Arab Emirates (IFPI)	18
UK Singles (Official Charts)	2
US Billboard Hot 100	4
US Adult Contemporary (Billboard)	17
US Adult Pop Airplay (Billboard)	9
US Dance Airplay (Billboard)	13
US Pop Airplay (Billboard)	1
Venezuela Airplay (Record Report)	22

=== Monthly charts ===
Monthly chart performance for "Good Luck, Babe!"
Chart (2024–2025)	Peak position
Belarus Airplay (TopHit)	94
CIS Airplay (TopHit)	35
Czech Republic (Singles Digitál Top 100)	67
Estonia Airplay (TopHit)	6
Lithuania Airplay (TopHit)	35
Paraguay (SGP)	24
Romania Airplay (TopHit)	5
Slovakia (Singles Digitál Top 100)	67

=== Year-end charts ===
2024 year-end chart performance for "Good Luck, Babe!"
Chart (2024)	Position
Australia (ARIA)	13
Austria (Ö3 Austria Top 40)	47
Belgium (Ultratop 50 Flanders)	36
Belgium (Ultratop 50 Wallonia)	64
Canada (Canadian Hot 100)	19
CIS Airplay (TopHit)	100
Estonia Airplay (TopHit)	56
France (SNEP)	151
Germany (GfK)	68
Global 200 (Billboard)	31
Global Singles (IFPI)	11
Iceland (Tónlistinn)	18
Lithuania Airplay (TopHit)	48
Netherlands (Single Top 100)	84
New Zealand (Recorded Music NZ)	14
Philippines (Philippines Hot 100)	26
Poland (Polish Airplay Top 100)	18
Poland (Polish Streaming Top 100)	78
Portugal (AFP)	60
Romania Airplay (TopHit)	51
Sweden (Sverigetopplistan)	81
Switzerland (Schweizer Hitparade)	58
UK Singles (OCC)	8
US Billboard Hot 100	18
US Adult Top 40 (Billboard)	30
US Mainstream Top 40 (Billboard)	19

2025 year-end chart performance for "Good Luck, Babe!"
Chart (2025)	Position
Argentina Anglo Airplay (Monitor Latino)	21
Australia (ARIA)	18
Austria (Ö3 Austria Top 40)	63
Belgium (Ultratop 50 Flanders)	76
Belgium (Ultratop 50 Wallonia)	93
Canada (Canadian Hot 100)	29
Canada AC (Billboard)	25
Canada CHR/Top 40 (Billboard)	15
Canada Hot AC (Billboard)	24
Canada Modern Rock (Billboard)	79
Chile Airplay (Monitor Latino)	37
CIS Airplay (TopHit)	108
Estonia Airplay (TopHit)	107
France (SNEP)	196
Global 200 (Billboard)	18
Lithuania Airplay (TopHit)	165
Philippines (Philippines Hot 100)	66
Poland (Polish Airplay Top 100)	54
Poland (Polish Streaming Top 100)	67
Romania Airplay (TopHit)	54
Sweden (Sverigetopplistan)	83
Switzerland (Schweizer Hitparade)	94
UK Singles (OCC)	13
US Billboard Hot 100	31

== Certifications ==
Certifications and sales for "Good Luck, Babe!"
Region	Certification	Certified units/sales
Australia (ARIA)	8× Platinum	560,000^{‡}
Austria (IFPI Austria)	Gold	15,000^{‡}
Belgium (BRMA)	Platinum	40,000^{‡}
Brazil (Pro-Música Brasil)	3× Diamond	480,000^{‡}
Canada (Music Canada)	4× Platinum	320,000^{‡}
Denmark (IFPI Danmark)	Platinum	90,000^{‡}
France (SNEP)	Diamond	333,333^{‡}
Germany (BVMI)	Gold	300,000^{‡}
Italy (FIMI)	Gold	50,000^{‡}
New Zealand (RMNZ)	5× Platinum	150,000^{‡}
Poland (ZPAV)	2× Platinum	100,000^{‡}
Portugal (AFP)	3× Platinum	30,000^{‡}
Spain (Promusicae)	Platinum	60,000^{‡}
United Kingdom (BPI)	4× Platinum	2,400,000^{‡}
United States (RIAA)	6× Platinum	6,000,000^{‡}
Streaming
Central America (CFC)	Platinum	7,000,000^{†}
Greece (IFPI Greece)	Platinum	2,000,000^{†}
^{‡} Sales+streaming figures based on certification alone.^{†} Streaming-only figures based on certification alone.

== Release history ==
Release dates and format(s) for "Good Luck, Babe!"
Region	Date	Format(s)	Label	Ref.
Various	April 5, 2024	Digital download; streaming	Amusement; Island	
United States	April 18, 2024	Contemporary hit radio	Amusement; Island	
Various	June 28, 2024	7-inch single	Amusement; Island	
United States	July 15, 2024	Hot adult contemporary radio	Amusement; Island	
Italy	August 22, 2024	Radio airplay	Island Italy	

== See also ==
- List of Billboard Hot 100 top-ten singles in 2024
- List of number-one singles of 2024 (Ireland)
- List of top 10 singles for 2024 in Australia
- List of UK top-ten singles in 2024
