= Pink Pony Club =

2020 single by Chappell Roan

Single by Chappell Roan
- B-side: "Naked in Manhattan"
- Written: February 2019
- Released: April 3, 2020
- Recorded: 2019
- Genre: Pop; synth-pop; dance-pop; power pop; disco-pop; disco
- Length: 4:18
- Label: Atlantic; Amusement; Island
- Songwriters: Kayleigh Amstutz; Daniel Nigro
- Producer: Daniel Nigro

Chappell Roan singles chronology
| "School Nights" (2018) | "Pink Pony Club" (2020) | "Love Me Anyway" (2020) |

Music video
- "Pink Pony Club" on YouTube

"Pink Pony Club" is a song by the American singer and songwriter Chappell Roan. It was released through Atlantic Records on April 3, 2020, and was later included on her debut studio album, The Rise and Fall of a Midwest Princess (2023). Written by Roan and Daniel Nigro, "Pink Pony Club" features elements of pop, synth-pop, dance-pop, power pop, disco-pop, and disco and describes the story of a woman moving to Southern California from her home residence of Tennessee, taking a job as a dancer in a gay club in West Hollywood despite her mother's objections.

"Pink Pony Club" received a positive critical reception amidst the rise of Roan's popularity after the release of the song's parent album, receiving praise for its musical composition and story. It drew commercial success five years after its initial release following a performance at the 2025 Grammy Awards, at which Roan won Best New Artist. The track topped the national chart of the United Kingdom and charted within the top ten in Australia, Canada, Ireland, and the United States. It received multi-platinum certifications in Australia, New Zealand, the United Kingdom, and the United States. A music video for "Pink Pony Club" accompanied its release in April 2020, featuring cameo appearances from drag queens Victoria "Porkchop" Parker and Meatball.

== Background and composition ==
Chappell Roan was inspired to write "Pink Pony Club" after visiting the Abbey, a gay bar in West Hollywood, California, in 2018. Roan, who had recently moved from her hometown of Springfield, Missouri, stated that visiting the bar was "the first time I could truly be myself and not be judged". At the bar, she became enthralled with the performing go-go dancers, stating that seeing them "sparked [something] in me... I want[ed] to be a go-go dancer. So I just wrote a song about it." According to Roan, she had previously struggled with accepting herself in Springfield, stating in Headliner, "I always had such a hard time being myself and felt like I'd be judged for being different or being creative", adding that the bar was "something that I couldn't really have experienced here in Missouri... It was completely eye opening and changed my direction from that point on."

"Pink Pony Club" has been described as a pop, synth-pop, dance-pop, power pop, disco-pop and disco song. It follows the story of a woman from a small town in Tennessee who moves to Southern California, and experiences freedom dancing in a gay club for the first time inspired by a local strip club in Roan's former hometown of Springfield, Missouri, that was in "all hot pink". The woman's mother disapproves upon hearing the news, saying to her daughter, "God, what have you done?" Despite her mother's opinions, the woman opts to continue, stating that "I'm just having fun", having found in what was described in a Capital Buzz analysis as a "safe space where you feel free to be exactly who you are".

== Production and release ==
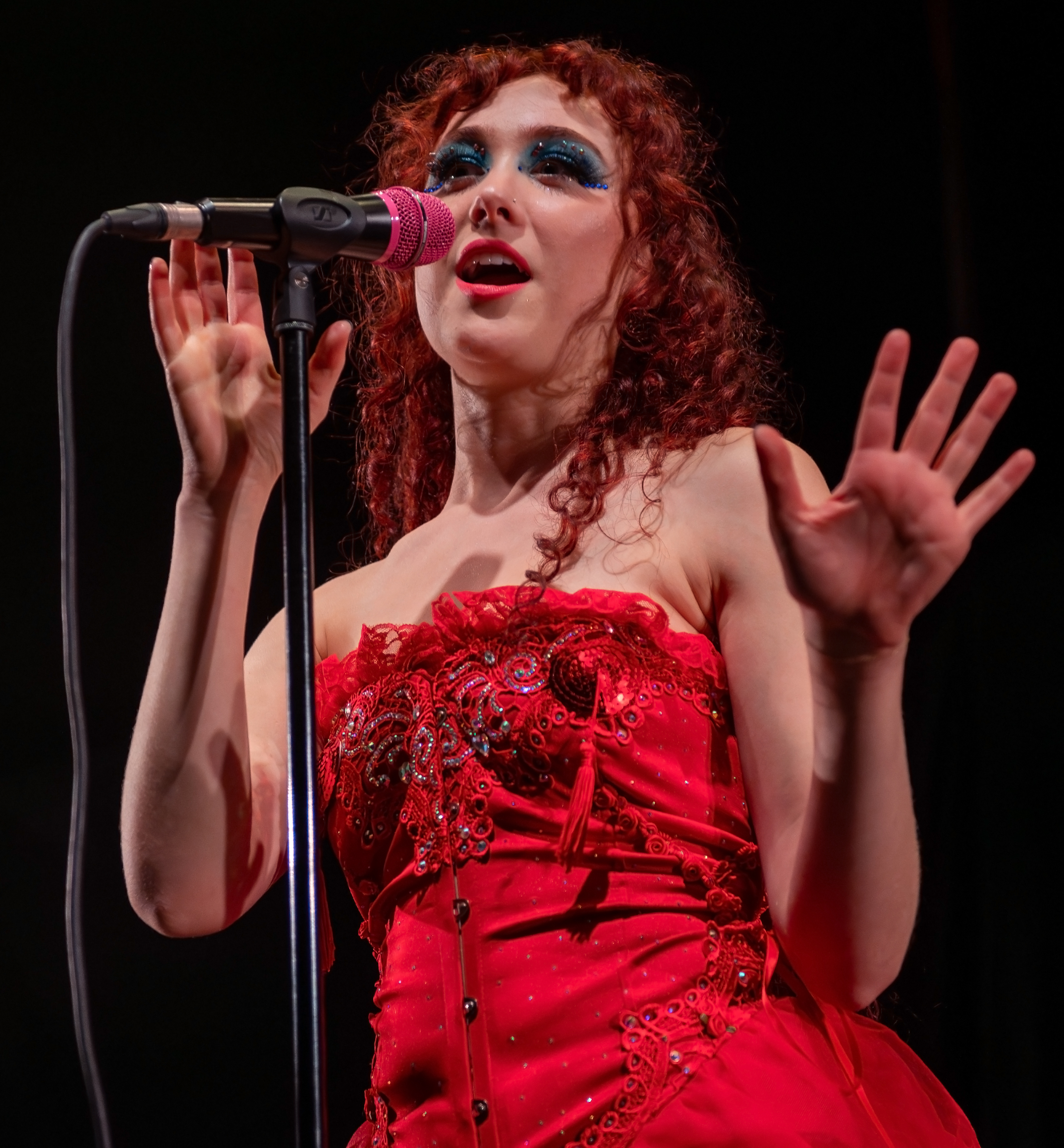
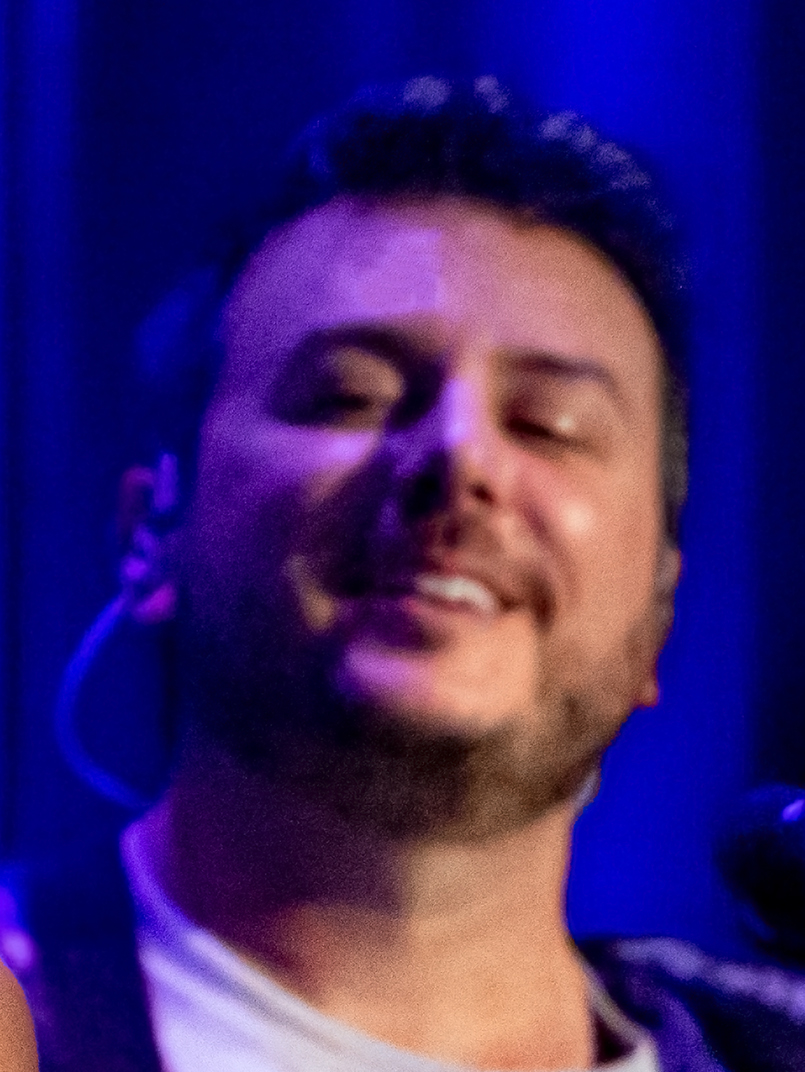
"Pink Pony Club" was written by Chappell Roan (left) and Dan Nigro (right).

Roan wrote "Pink Pony Club" with Dan Nigro within two days in February 2019, and recorded it in the same year. Initially, the label tried to dissuade her from releasing the song as they thought it deviated too much from Roan's past songs, leaving Roan "devastated" and making her "second-guess herself". According to Roan, Atlantic Records refused to release the song for a year before they relented. "Pink Pony Club" was officially released on April 3, 2020, marketed as the lead single to an upcoming debut album with Atlantic Records. Roan claimed that in the aftermath of her leaving Atlantic, she was granted majority of the ownership of the master recordings for several songs, including "Pink Pony Club". "Pink Pony Club" was later included on Roan's debut studio album, The Rise and Fall of a Midwest Princess, released on September 22, 2023, through Amusement and Island Records.

=== Music video ===
The song's music video, directed by Griffin Stoddard with cinematography by Oren Soffer, was released on April 3, 2020. It features cameo appearances from drag queens Victoria "Porkchop" Parker and Meatball. Roan stated that she was "absolutely terrified" of her performance during production. The video takes place in "a Midwest dive bar", with Roan, Porkchop, and Meatball performing on the bar's stage to a few leather-clad bikers, eventually turning the bikers into "leather daddies". The Conversation's Jonathan Graffam–O'Meara thought that the music video represented "the utopic potentiality of performance" for queer people from "the stultifying and oppressive real world that awaits performers and audiences outside of venues."

== Critical reception ==
Although "Pink Pony Club" did not receive much critical attention upon release, it has received consistent positive reception in the following years. Vulture's Rebecca Alter praised the song in 2021, describing it as a "synthy infectious bangarang... It's a stripper anthem that squeezes itself in perfectly with the likes of 'WAP' and 'Twerkulator,' just with a little bit more of a drama-kid kick." In a review of the song's parent album, Pitchfork's Olivia Horn proclaimed "Pink Pony Club" to be a "bold and uproarious pop project stitched with stories about discovering love, sex, and oneself in a new place." Both Kitty Empire of The Guardian and Mark Savage of BBC News credited the song as Roan's first career hit, with both describing it as a liberating queer party anthem. Paste's Eric Bennett deemed "Pink Pony Club" an "immediately memorable artistic statement" and praised its chorus. Reflecting on the song's later success, after the label's initial negative response and the song's commercial underperformance, Roan remarked, "it's like damn bitch, were you wrong? It was the worst time ever to release a gay club song [around the pandemic]. And it still had such an impact."

Critics' Year-End rankings of "Pink Pony Club"
| Publication | List | Rank | Ref. |
|---|---|---|---|
| Billboard | The 100 Best Songs of 2024 | 32 | |

In 2026, the song was used to wake up the crew of Artemis II on the fourth day of their mission to the moon.

== Live performances ==
Amidst her rise in popularity, Roan performed "Pink Pony Club" at various festivals and shows. In 2024, she performed it as the closing song at major U.S. music festivals, including the Boston Calling Music Festival, the Capitol Hill Block Party, the Hinterland Music Festival, Outside Lands, Lollapalooza, and the Austin City Limits Music Festival. She also performed the song at the Canadian Osheaga Festival. Roan played "Pink Pony Club" for a Tiny Desk Concert for NPR Music on March 21, 2024. On November 2, 2024, she performed the song during an appearance on Saturday Night Live. On February 2, 2025, Roan performed the track at the 67th Annual Grammy Awards, where she also won Best New Artist. On March 3, 2025, she performed "Pink Pony Club" as a duet with Elton John at his Oscars viewing party for the Elton John AIDS Foundation.

== Commercial performance ==
"Pink Pony Club" achieved commercial success five years after its initial release following the Grammy performance. It reached number 16 on the Billboard Global 200 chart dated February 22, 2025. In the United States, the track debuted at number 90 on the Billboard Hot 100 for the week ending June 29, 2024, before peaking at number four on the chart dated April 26, 2025. It also reached number one on the Pop Airplay and Adult Pop Airplay charts, number 11 on the Adult Contemporary chart, and number 20 on the Dance/Mix Show Airplay chart.

In the United Kingdom, "Pink Pony Club" debuted at number 21 on the UK Singles Chart for the week ending date September 26, 2024. The song entered the top ten at number four during its 13th non-consecutive week on the chart for the week ending February 20, 2025. Three weeks later, after Roan won two awards at the 2025 Brit Awards, "Pink Pony Club" reached number one on the UK Singles Chart for the week ending date March 13, 2025, becoming her first chart-topping song in the United Kingdom. "Pink Pony Club" also reached the top 30 in Australia (2), Canada (2), Ireland (2), New Zealand (11), Lebanon (12), Slovakia (19), Austria (26), Iceland (26), and the Philippines (26).

"Pink Pony Club" was certified five-times platinum in the United States, four-times platinum in Australia and the United Kingdom, triple platinum in New Zealand, platinum in Canada and France, and gold in Denmark and Spain.

== Other versions ==
Avril Lavigne performed a mashup of "Pink Pony Club" and her song "We Are Warriors" (2020) on the North American leg of her Greatest Hits Tour (2024–2025). Rick Astley also posted an acoustic cover version of the song to YouTube on March 3, 2025. Moon Taxi released a cover of the song as their latest single in June 2025. GWAR performed a metal cover of the song which was released on The A.V. Club's YouTube channel on January, 15th 2026. Gwar have also added the song to their live concerts for a 2026 tour.

== Charts ==
=== Weekly charts ===
Weekly chart performance for "Pink Pony Club"
| Chart (2024–2025) | Peak position |
|---|---|
| Australia (ARIA) | 2 |
| Austria (Ö3 Austria Top 40) | 26 |
| Canada Hot 100 (Billboard) | 2 |
| Canada AC (Billboard) | 1 |
| Canada CHR/Top 40 (Billboard) | 1 |
| Canada Hot AC (Billboard) | 1 |
| Canada Modern Rock (Billboard Canada) | 39 |
| France (SNEP) | 157 |
| Germany (GfK) | 67 |
| Greece International (IFPI) | 65 |
| Global 200 (Billboard) | 16 |
| Iceland (Tónlistinn) | 26 |
| Ireland (IRMA) | 2 |
| Latvia Airplay (LaIPA) | 8 |
| Lebanon (Lebanese Top 20) | 12 |
| Lithuania (AGATA) | 71 |
| Lithuania Airplay (TopHit) | 61 |
| Malta Airplay (Radiomonitor) | 3 |
| Netherlands (Single Top 100) | 71 |
| New Zealand (Recorded Music NZ) | 11 |
| Nigeria (TurnTable Top 100) | 85 |
| Norway (IFPI Norge) | 97 |
| Philippines (Philippines Hot 100) | 26 |
| Romania Airplay (TopHit) | 100 |
| San Marino Airplay (SMRTV Top 50) | 12 |
| Slovakia Airplay (ČNS IFPI) | 19 |
| South Africa Airplay (TOSAC) | 11 |
| Sweden (Sverigetopplistan) | 58 |
| Switzerland (Schweizer Hitparade) | 57 |
| UK Singles (Official Charts) | 1 |
| US Billboard Hot 100 | 4 |
| US Adult Contemporary (Billboard) | 11 |
| US Adult Pop Airplay (Billboard) | 1 |
| US Dance Airplay (Billboard) | 20 |
| US Pop Airplay (Billboard) | 1 |

=== Monthly charts ===
Monthly chart performance for "Pink Pony Club"
| Chart (2025) | Peak position |
|---|---|
| Lithuania Airplay (TopHit) | 77 |

=== Year-end charts ===
Year-end chart performance for "Pink Pony Club"
| Chart (2025) | Position |
|---|---|
| Australia (ARIA) | 20 |
| Belgium (Ultratop 50 Flanders) | 130 |
| Canada (Canadian Hot 100) | 8 |
| Canada AC (Billboard) | 11 |
| Canada CHR/Top 40 (Billboard) | 1 |
| Canada Hot AC (Billboard) | 5 |
| Global 200 (Billboard) | 23 |
| Iceland (Tónlistinn) | 75 |
| Lithuania Airplay (TopHit) | 128 |
| UK Singles (OCC) | 3 |
| US Billboard Hot 100 | 10 |
| US Adult Contemporary (Billboard) | 16 |
| US Adult Pop Airplay (Billboard) | 5 |
| US Pop Airplay (Billboard) | 2 |

== Certifications ==
Certifications for "Pink Pony Club"
| Region | Certification | Certified units/sales |
|---|---|---|
| Australia (ARIA) | 4× Platinum | 280,000^{‡} |
| Canada (Music Canada) | Platinum | 80,000^{‡} |
| Denmark (IFPI Danmark) | Gold | 45,000^{‡} |
| France (SNEP) | Platinum | 200,000^{‡} |
| New Zealand (RMNZ) | 3× Platinum | 90,000^{‡} |
| Spain (Promusicae) | Gold | 50,000^{‡} |
| United Kingdom (BPI) | 4× Platinum | 2,400,000^{‡} |
| United States (RIAA) | 5× Platinum | 5,000,000^{‡} |
^{‡} Sales+streaming figures based on certification alone.

== Release history ==
Release history and formats for "Pink Pony Club"
| Country | Date | Format(s) | Label(s) | Ref. |
|---|---|---|---|---|
| Various | April 3, 2020 | Digital download; streaming | Atlantic | |
| Various | April 23, 2022 | Digital download; streaming | Self-released | |
| Various | March 1, 2023 | Digital download; streaming | Amusement; Island | |
| Various | April 20, 2024 | 7-inch vinyl | Island | |
| United States | November 5, 2024 | Contemporary hit radio | Island | |
| United States | February 7, 2025 | 7-inch vinyl | Amusement; Island | |
| Italy | February 7, 2025 | Radio airplay | Island | |

== See also ==
- List of UK Singles Chart number ones of the 2020s
