= Kilby Block Party =

Music festival in Salt Lake City, Utah

Kilby Block Party is an annual, three-day independent music festival in Salt Lake City, Utah.

== History ==
=== Origins ===
Kilby Block Party was initially organized in 2019 to commemorate the 20th anniversary of Kilby Court, a venue known for hosting emerging artists. It started off as a one-day event that took place on a closed-off street near Kilby Court, featuring a lineup that reflected the venue's legacy of supporting indie and alternative music. Due to its success and positive reception, the festival expanded in subsequent years, moving to larger locations to accommodate increasing attendance.

After its initial success, Kilby Block Party continued to evolve, attracting a wider audience and securing high-profile headliners. The festival expanded beyond its original block party setting, relocating to larger venues within Salt Lake City, currently settled at Utah State Fairpark. With each edition, the lineup has grown to include a diverse mix of indie rock, alternative, and pop acts, making it a significant event in Utah's music scene.

== Events ==
Kilby Block Party yearly overview
Year	Dates	Location	Headliners	Notable developments
2019	May 11	Granary District	Death Cab for Cutie	Inaugural single-day event
2021	October 2	Granary District	Young the Giant	Post-pandemic return with first afterparties
2022	May 13-14	Library Square	Phoebe Bridgers • Mac DeMarco	First two-day format; venue change
2023	May 12-14	Utah State Fairpark	The Strokes • Pavement • Yeah Yeah Yeahs	Expanded to 3 days
2024	May 10-12	Utah State Fairpark	LCD Soundsystem • The Postal Service • Vampire Weekend	25th anniversary edition
2025	May 15-18	Utah State Fairpark	New Order • Beach House • Weezer • Justice	4 days for this one only
2026	May 15-17	Utah State Fairpark	Lorde • The xx • Turnstile	
2027	May 14-16	Utah State Fairpark	Deftones • Fontaines D.C. • The Strokes • Slayyyter • Jungle • Lil Yachty	

=== 2019 ===
In 2019, the first Kilby Block Party was hosted on Saturday, May 11th starting at 3pm in the Granary District (400 W 700 S). It was an all-day block party that included music, food trucks, craft beer, and art installations.

- The Backseat Lovers
- Blue Rain Boots
- Breakfast in Silence
- Death Cab for Cutie
- Drew Danburry
- Joshua James
- The National Parks
- Palace of Buddies
- Picture This
- Resonate
- Ritt Momney
- The Sardines
- Sincerely
- The Universe

=== 2020 ===
There was no festival in 2020 due to the COVID-19 pandemic.

=== 2021 ===
The second Kilby Block Party was hosted on Saturday, October 2nd, 2021 at the same location from 2019. It was an all-day block party, starting at 1pm, that included music, art installations, craft beer, and food trucks. 2021's Kilby Block Party Lineup also boasted an after party at The Urban Lounge with Mates of State and Flash & Flare.

- Anais Chantal
- Becca Mancari
- Blue Rain Boots
- Built to Spill
- Dad Bod
- Darling
- Drusky
- Flor
- Horrible Penny
- IDKHow
- Kipper Snack
- Krooked Kings
- The Moss
- Ron Gallo
- Sammy Brue
- Who Killed Candace
- Young the Giant

=== 2022 ===
In 2022 Kilby Block Party expanded into a two day festival on May 13th and 14th. It took place at a new location: Library Square in Downtown Salt Lake City. The lineup also advertised after parties at Urban Lounge and Blue Gene's with Choir Boy on May 13th and Form of Rocket on May 14th.

- Alvvays
- Animal Collective
- Bartees Strange
- Binki
- Blue Rain Boots
- Brother
- Car Seat Headrest
- Choir Boy
- Clairo
- Cop Kid
- Dad Bod
- The Devil Whale
- Fonteyn
- Form of Rocket
- Future.Exboyfriend
- Goldsmith
- Idi Et Amin
- Jawny
- JW Francis
- Kevin Devine
- Kississippi
- Lomelda
- Lord Vox
- Mac DeMarco
- Mild High Club
- Nicole Canaan
- Phoebe Bridgers
- The Rubies
- Sam Evian
- Soccer Mommy
- Spirit of the Beehive
- Steve Lacy
- The Still Tide
- The Walters
- Worlds Worst

=== 2023 ===
Kilby Block Party expanded to 3 days (May 12th - May 14th, 2023) and took place at the Utah State Fairpark.

- Alex G
- Alice Phoebe Lou
- Anais Chantal
- Backhand
- The Backseat Lovers
- Caroline Polachek
- Crumb
- Cuco
- Deeper
- Deerhoof
- Dominic Fike.
- Dreamer Isioma
- Duster
- Ethel Cain
- Faye Webster
- Fonteyn
- Goth Babe
- Grace Ives
- Frankie Cosmos
- Gus Dapperton
- Hi Again
- Hippo Campus
- Homophone
- Indigo De Souza
- Japanese Breakfast
- Jean Dawson
- Josh Doss & The Cancers
- Julie
- Kate Bollinger
- Kipper Snack
- Lucius
- Mannequin Pussy
- Miya Folick
- Momma
- The Moss
- Musor
- Noso
- Osees
- Pavement
- Pixies
- The Plastic Cherries
- Remi Wolf
- Ritt Momney
- Run the Jewels
- Spill Tab
- The Strokes
- Sundials
- Sunsleeper
- Surf Curse
- Tamino
- Tanukichan
- Tolchock Trio
- The Walkmen
- Wallice
- Wednesday
- Westerman
- Weyes Blood
- Worlds Worst
- Yeah Yeah Yeahs

=== 2024 ===
Kilby Block Party 5, hosted May 10th through May 12th of 2024 at the Utah State Fairpark, celebrated 25 years of Kilby Court. According to Nic Smith, the managing director of S&S Presents which runs Kilby Court, Kilby Block Party 5 was the biggest and most attended festival so far.

- 26Fix
- 100 gecs
- Abby Sage
- Alvvays
- Death Cab for Cutie
- Andy Shauf
- Annie DiRusso
- Arcy Drive
- Beach Fossils
- Belle and Sebastian
- Blondshell
- Blue Rain Boots
- Bobo
- Body of Leaves
- Bombay Bicycle Club
- Boyfriend Sushi Town
- Cautious Clay
- Choir Boy
- Courtney Barnett
- CSS
- Current Joys
- Dayglow
- Daytime Lover
- Dinosaur Jr.
- Drusky
- Ekkstacy
- Fazerdaze
- The Garden
- Ginger Root
- Guided by Voices
- Gustaf
- Hana Vu
- Hemlocke Springs
- Horse Jumper of Love
- Interpol
- Jai Paul
- Joanna Newsom
- Joanna Sternberg
- Kara Jackson
- Kevin Kaarl
- Krooked Kings
- Late Night Drive Home
- LCD Soundsystem
- Little Moon
- Lomelda
- Luna Li
- Malcolm Todd
- Model/Actriz
- Nicole Canaan
- Odie Leigh
- Panchiko
- Peach Pit
- Persona 749
- Petey
- Pond
- The Postal Service
- Royel Otis
- Santigold
- Sculpture Club
- Slow Pulp
- TAGABOW
- TV Girl
- Ty Segall
- Unknown Mortal Orchestra
- Vampire Weekend
- Water From Your Eyes
- Yellow Days
- Yoke Lore
- Yot Club
- Yves Tumor

=== 2025 ===
- Barrie
- Bartees Strange
- Beach House
- Been Stellar
- Beeson
- Being Dead
- The Black Angels
- Black Country, New Road
- Built to Spill
- Car Seat Headrest
- Cardinal Bloom
- Devo
- Elowyn
- Faerybabyy
- Free Range
- Friko
- Frost Children
- Future Islands
- Gang of Four
- Geese
- George Clanton
- GIFT
- Hannah Frances
- hey, nothing
- Hovvdy
- Hurtado
- Husbands
- IDKHow
- Jay Som
- Jelani Aryeh
- Josaleigh Pollett
- Justice
- The Lemon Twigs
- Levelor
- Lime Garden
- Lunar Vacation
- Marshall Van Leuven
- Medium Build
- Melancholy Club
- Molotov Dress
- Momma
- Montell Fish
- Nation of Language
- New Order
- Nourished by Time
- Orla Gartland
- Over Under
- Ovlov
- The Pains of Being Pure at Heart
- Panda Bear
- Perfume Genius
- Peter McPoland
- Poolhouse
- Real Estate
- Rilo Kiley
- Sasami
- Sloppy Jane
- Slowdive
- St. Vincent
- Still Woozy
- Suki Waterhouse
- Teen Suicide
- Tennis
- Toro y Moi
- TV on the Radio
- Vacations
- Vagabon
- Wallows
- Walt Disco
- Weezer
- Wishy
- Wisp
- Yo La Tengo
- Youbet
- Youth Lagoon

=== 2026 ===
- Alex G
- American Football
- Automatic
- Bad Luck Brigade
- Beach Bunny
- Ben Kweller
- Between Friends
- Blood Orange
- Briston Maroney
- Cardinals
- Caroline
- Chalk
- Chanel Beads
- Clap Your Hands Say Yeah
- Dad Bod
- Dehd
- Die Spitz
- Drugdealer
- Dry Cleaning
- Ethan Regan
- Father John Misty
- Feeble Little Horse
- Fightmaster
- Flipturn
- Folk Bitch Trio
- Freak Slug
- Gelli Haha
- Glom
- Gonk
- Grandaddy
- Hannah Cohen
- Hayley Williams
- Hotline TNT
- Jane Remover
- Japanese Breakfast
- Jill Whit
- KennyHoopla
- Kevin Morby
- The Kilans
- The Last Dinner Party
- Lorde
- Lucy Dacus
- Lyn Lapid
- Magdalena Bay
- Melody's Echo Chamber
- Modest Mouse
- The Moss
- Mustard Service
- Nadezhda
- NewDad
- Old Mervs
- Pattie Gonia
- Pixie & the Partygrass Boys
- Provoker
- Quadeca
- Rachael Jenkins
- Ritt Momney
- Show Me the Body
- Smerz
- Snail Mail
- Sports
- Starr 67
- This is Lorelei
- Tops
- Turnstile
- Wilbere
- Wild Nothing
- Wombo
- The xx
- YHWH Nailgun

=== 2027 ===
- After
- Angine de Poitrine
- Annabelle Dinda
- Atlas Sound
- Auxo.
- Bandalos Chinos
- Bee Blackwell
- Bonneville
- Caroline Rose
- Choir Boy
- Cool Banana
- Current Joys
- Deftones
- Dillom
- Ear
- Erika de Casier
- Fontaines D.C.
- Frankie and the Witch Fingers
- Gapyear
- Genesis Owusu
- Grace Ives
- Greg Freeman
- Haute & Freddy
- Heathers
- The Hellp
- Hot Chip
- Iceage
- Idles
- Joyce Manor
- Julien Baker
- Jungle
- Kim Gordon
- Kurt Vile & The Violators
- Lil Yachty
- The Linda Lindas
- Lillies
- Lip Critic
- Love Spells
- Lowertown
- Madra Salach
- Mary in the Junkyard
- Mercury Rev
- Olympic Deth
- Phantogram
- Porches
- Prostitute
- Quiet Light
- Racing Mount Pleasant
- The Radio Dept.
- Rally
- Ratboys
- Rehash
- Remi Wolf
- Rocket
- Roo Nostalgia
- Seeking the Sun
- Sextile
- Silversun Pickups
- Slayyyter
- Spoon
- Stage Fright
- The Strokes
- Tiffany Day
- Tokyo Tea Room
- Truman Sinclair
- Twin Peaks
- Two Door Cinema Club
- Underscores
- Victoryland
- Wednesday
- Westside Cowboy
- Weyes Blood
- Whitney
- Wolf Parade
- Wunderhorse
