= Daisy Chain Fields =

2026 benefit concert and music festival

- Date: August 29, 2026
- Location: 8000 Great Park Boulevard Orange County Great Park (Irvine, California)
- Type: Benefit concert; Music festival
- Patrons: Athleta; Brooks Sports; Depop; Etsy; Lego; Taco Bell; Verizon
- Organized by: Olivia Rodrigo
- Website: daisychainfields.com

Daisy Chain Fields is a charitable American music festival held at Great Park in Irvine, California. Inspired by Lilith Fair, it was founded by American singer-songwriter Olivia Rodrigo and took place on August 29, 2026.

It featured performances by Bikini Kill, the Breeders, Chappell Roan, Devon Again, Die Spitz, Doechii, Eli, Garbage, Mitski, Not for Radio, Quiet Light, Rachel Chinouriri, Santigold, and Rodrigo herself (with special guests Alanis Morissette, Sarah McLachlan, and Stevie Nicks). The women-led line-up appeared without payment. The event raised $20 million in total; proceeds went toward ten charities supporting various causes such as women's issues and labor rights. Rodrigo has stated she has hopes for it to be an annual event, with early plans set for 2027.

== Background ==
American singer-songwriter Olivia Rodrigo appeared in Lilith Fair: Building a Mystery (2025), a documentary about the women-led music festival Lilith Fair, in which she cited it as an inspiration to her career; Lilith Fair co-founder Sarah McLachlan is one of the performers at Daisy Chain Fields and was the first person Rodrigo contacted when forming the idea for the festival. Rodrigo contacted each invited performer individually.

She announced the festival on June 22, 2026, through social media, a Pitchfork e-magazine, and Greater Los Angeles radio station 88.5 The SoCal Sound. The radio announcement came at the end of an hour-long show on the station, hosted by Rodrigo, in which she played songs by artists from the festival's line-up. In an interview with Shaad D'Souza for the Pitchfork e-magazine, Rodrigo said that the festival was inspired by Lilith Fair and that "I just feel like we need something really positive to do and see, and young girls need awesome role models who are supporting other women and who are engaging in something that's really joyful and musical and community-oriented." In an interview with Brooke LaMantia for The Cut, Rodrigo said that she wanted the festival's branding to feel detached from the roll-out of her album You Seem Pretty Sad for a Girl So in Love, describing Daisy Chain Fields's aesthetic as "riot grrrl meets flower child". She also expressed hope that the festival can become an annual occurrence.

Tickets for the festival sold out within thirty minutes on June 24, 2026, which led to event partner Verizon issuing new tickets on July 9, 2026. Later in July, the Daisy Chain Reaction Volunteer Drive was announced in partnership with L.A. Works; the initiative gives people the chance to win one of 125 pairs of tickets to the festival for engaging in volunteer work. Around forty-five thousand tickets were sold in total.

The festival's sponsors were Athleta, Brooks Sports, Depop, Etsy, Lego, Taco Bell, and Verizon. Rodrigo co-designed a collection of merchandise for the festival with ten female entrepreneurs; the collection was available for online purchase through Etsy and also on festival grounds. Two iHeartRadio specials serve as promotion for the festival: on August 28, 2026, an hour-long Rodrigo appearance as guest host on She Is the Voice, playing a combination of the other performers' songs and songs from You Seem Pretty Sad for a Girl So in Love; and on August 31, 2026, a thirty-minute compilation of recordings from Rodrigo's set at the festival.

== Fundraising ==
All of the profit from Daisy Chain Fields will be donated to charity, and the performers at the festival all agreed to appear without payment. The beneficiaries are:

- Baby2Baby
- Black Mamas Matter Alliance
- Center for Reproductive Rights
- FreeFrom
- Jhpiego
- Johns Hopkins Center for Indigenous Health
- National Domestic Workers Alliance
- National Institute for Reproductive Health
- National Women's Law Center
- Planned Parenthood

In August 2026, Rodrigo released two charity singles in support of the festival's fund: "Purple (Happy Version)" via Bandcamp on August 7 and "Serena Joy", first through 500 compact disc copies on August 21 and then digitally on August 24. On August 28, 2026, it was announced that the total fund had reached $10 million. During the festival, Melinda French Gates announced that her organization Pivotal Ventures would match the money raised, bringing the total to $20 million.

== Lineup ==
The lineup was announced concurrently with the festival announcement in June. The set times were announced in August. Katseye were replaced with Devon Again after Katseye member Megan Skiendiel suffered an ankle injury two days before the festival. Three members of Katseye made a brief on-stage appearance ahead of Devon Again's set. Karen O was announced as one of the special guests for Rodrigo's set; Alanis Morissette appeared in her place after she dropped out due to a family emergency.

| Scheduled time | Dandelion Stage | Marigold Stage |
|---|---|---|
| 11:20–11:50 | —N/a | Quiet Light |
| 11:55–12:25 | Eli | —N/a |
| 12:30–1:00 | —N/a | Rachel Chinouriri |
| 1:05–1:35 | Devon Again | —N/a |
| 1:40–2:10 | —N/a | Die Spitz |
| 2:15–2:45 | Santigold | —N/a |
| 2:50–3:30 | —N/a | Bikini Kill |
| 3:40–4:20 | Mitski | —N/a |
| 4:30–5:10 | —N/a | The Breeders |
| 5:20–6:00 | Doechii | —N/a |
| 6:10–6:50 | —N/a | Garbage |
| 7:00–7:40 | Chappell Roan | —N/a |
| 7:50–8:30 | —N/a | Not for Radio |
| 8:40–10:00 | Olivia Rodrigo (Note: With special guests Alanis Morissette, Sarah McLachlan, and Stevie Nicks) | —N/a |
