= Serena Joy (song) =

Single by Olivia Rodrigo
- Released: August 21, 2026
- Genre: Pop; post-punk
- Length: 3:05
- Label: Geffen; Interscope
- Songwriters: Olivia Rodrigo; Dan Nigro
- Producer: Dan Nigro

Olivia Rodrigo singles chronology
"Stupid Song" (2026)	"Serena Joy" (2026)	"Expectations" (2026)

Audio
- "Serena Joy" on YouTube

"Serena Joy" (stylized in all lowercase) is a charity single by American singer-songwriter Olivia Rodrigo, co-written with producer Dan Nigro. It was initially released as 500 compact disc copies by Geffen Records through the independent record store Analog Record Shop on August 24, 2026, then digitally via Interscope Records on the same day. The proceeds partially went toward the fund for Daisy Chain Fields, a charitable music festival Rodrigo founded, which took place on August 29, 2026.

"Serena Joy" is a pop and post-punk song named after a character from The Handmaid's Tale. Some critics commented that its lyrics were about the dangers of complicity in patriarchy and social oppression. Others pointed more specifically to 2020s American politics.

== Background and release ==
The existence of an Olivia Rodrigo song called "Serena Joy" was confirmed in June 2026 when a behind-the-scenes photograph showed eighteen songs being considered for inclusion on Rodrigo's album You Seem Pretty Sad for a Girl So in Love. She mentioned loving the song and said: "It didn't fit on the album. The record was very much a chronicle of a relationship—beginning, middle, and end. But I hope that it'll be a part of something else down the line." Rodrigo announced Daisy Chain Fields, a female-led charitable music festival, in June 2026. It took place in Irvine, California, on August 29, 2026.

On August 21, 2026, after having previously released charity single "Purple (Happy Version)" to support the festival's fund, Geffen Records released five hundred copies of "Serena Joy" on CD exclusively at Analog Record Shop in Tustin, California, also to support the festival. The store, located less than eight miles from the festival grounds, reported later that night that all copies had sold out. The song was released digitally on August 24, 2026. It was performed live at Daisy Chain Fields.

== Composition ==
The song is named after Serena Joy, a character from the novel The Handmaid's Tale, who—according to Variety's Chris Willman—"comes to regret her complicity with a repressive patriarchy." Willman notes that the song does not name the character or novel but that its "cautionary tale" lyrics have parallels to Joy's arc. He lists the following lyrics as the "clearest referrals" to her:

If they do it to them
They'll do it to you
If they do it to them
They're gonna do it to you

Consequence's Alex Krinsky also highlighted warning of "They'll do it to you", writing that "Rodrigo repeatedly warns that those willing to look away while others lose their rights shouldn't expect to remain protected themselves." Grazia's Anna Maria Giano praised Rodrigo's subject matter compared to her music industry peers and drew parallels between the song's lyrics and 2020s American politics, including some conservatives' proposal of household voting in political elections. Paste's Miranda Wollen, who referred to the beat as "Strokes-y", believed that the lyrics were "disparaging the public figures who have shut their eyes to the sociopolitical happenings of the last decade" and pointed to Rodrigo's public statements on women's reproductive rights under the second Trump presidency, the United States's support for Israel in the Gaza war, and actions by United States Immigration and Customs Enforcement. Pitchfork's Hattie Lindert and Walden Green wrote that "While the song's Peter Hook–esque bass line carries through the sonic palette of her new album [...] the subject matter shifts from that record's laser-focused autopsy of a relationship to broader concerns about societal ignorance and complicity."

Critics have described "Serena Joy" as a pop and post-punk track. DIY's A. L. Noonan wrote that it "leans into driving 80s-inflected post-punk energy, pairing angst with Rodrigo's characteristically confessional songwriting." Rolling Stone's Angie Martoccico wrote that the song has "layers of jubilant Devo-like synths" and compared it to Rodrigo's song "Expectations". Stereogum's Chris DeVille compared the song to the new wave influences on You Seem Pretty Sad for a Girl So in Love and wrote that he would "almost call it dance punk".

== Personnel ==
These credits have been adapted from multiple music streaming services.

- Olivia Rodrigo – composition, vocals
- Dan Nigro – composition, production, engineering, background vocals, bass, drums, guitar, organ, percussion, programming, synthesizer
- Mitch McCarthy – mixing
- Randy Merrill – mastering

== Charts ==
Chart performance
Chart (2026)	Peak position
Argentina Anglo Airplay (Monitor Latino)	18
Australia (ARIA)	77
Canada Hot 100 (Billboard)	64
Chile Anglo Airplay (Monitor Latino)	14
Global 200 (Billboard)	137
Guatemala Anglo Airplay (Monitor Latino)	11
Japan Hot Overseas (Billboard Japan)	2
Netherlands (Single Tip)	20
New Zealand Hot Singles (RMNZ)	2
Panama Anglo Airplay (Monitor Latino)	11
UK Singles (Official Charts)	52
US Billboard Hot 100	63
US Hot Rock & Alternative Songs (Billboard)	13

== Release history ==
Release history
Region	Date	Format(s)	Label	Ref.
United States	August 21, 2026	CD	Geffen	
Various	August 24, 2026	Digital download; streaming	Interscope	
