= Getting Killed World Tour =

2025–26 concert tour by Geese

- Tour by Geese
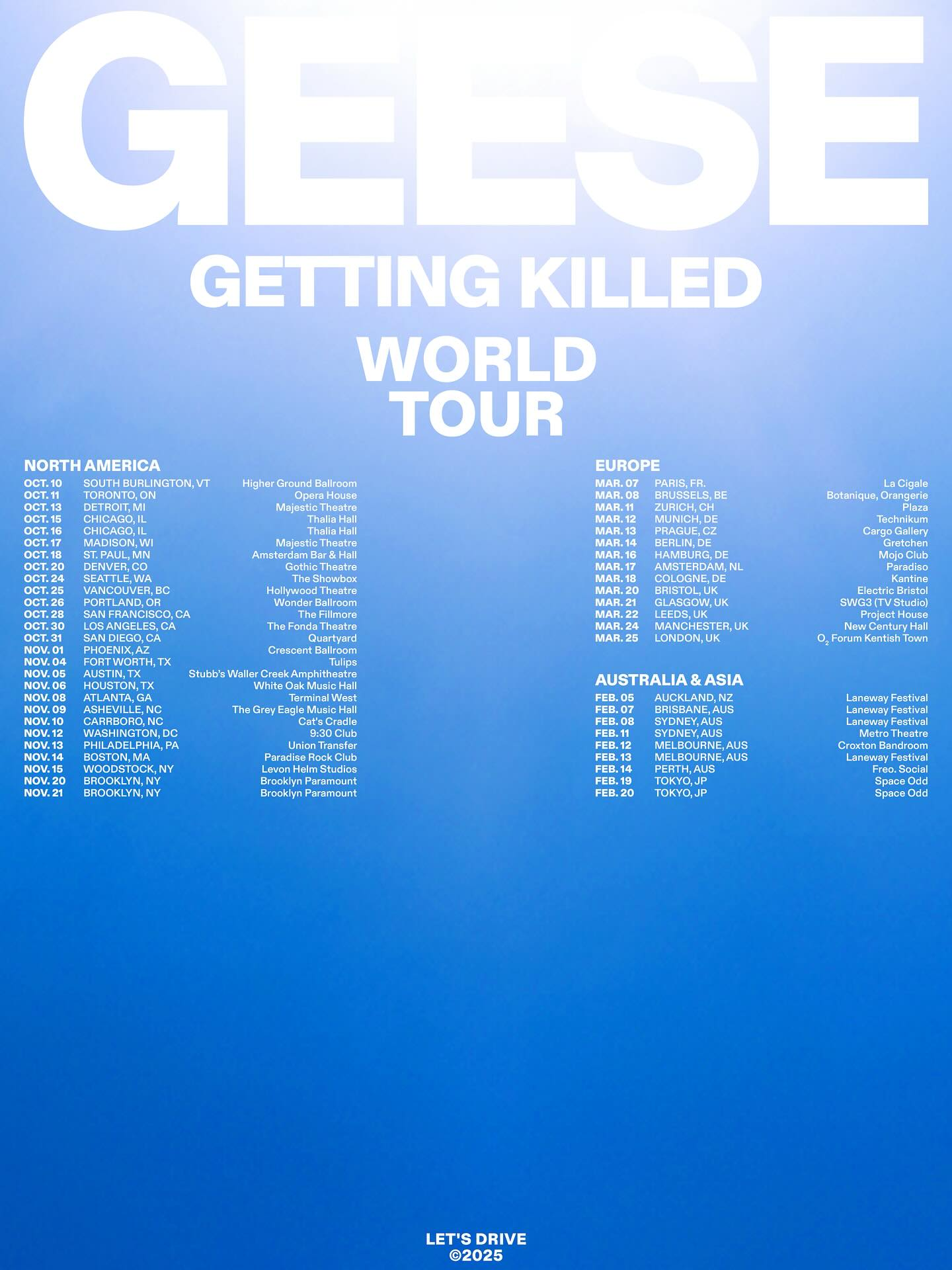
- Location: Asia; Europe; North America; Oceania
- Associated album: Getting Killed
- Start date: October 10, 2025
- End date: March 6, 2027
- Legs: 6
- No. of shows: 92
- Supporting acts: Racing Mount Pleasant; Dove Ellis; Radio Free Alice; Westside Cowboy; Iceage; Skydaddy; Gwenifer Raymond; Leenalchi; Billy Woods; Mariachi Oro de América; Julianna Barwick; Bill Orcutt; Easy Star All-Stars; Cold Court

Geese concert chronology
- 3D Country Tour (2023); Getting Killed World Tour (2025–2026)

The Getting Killed World Tour is the third headlining concert tour from American rock band Geese in support of their fourth studio album Getting Killed. The tour began on October 10, 2025 in South Burlington, Vermont and will end on March 6, 2027 in Melbourne.

== Background ==
In 2025, Geese released their fourth full-length album titled Getting Killed. The album received critical acclaim. Prior to the announcement of the album, the band announced a tour to happen in North America in the fall. In August, the band announced European tour dates. In September, the group announced more UK shows as well as shows in Australia and Japan.

Due to the hype surrounding Geese prior to the release of Getting Killed, a majority of the shows in the Getting Killed World Tour were sold out months in advance. These concerts were commonly hosted in venues with only a 1,000 person capacity. Because of this, Geese's shows were victim to ticket scalping and price gouging throughout the span of the tour. The retail price of the tour's tickets soared beyond its face value due to resellers, reaching within the range of $300-$1,000 USD. During their North American tour, Geese partnered with CashorTrade, a ticket-reselling market that prevents reselling tickets beyond their going rate.

On April 23, 2026, Geese announced another leg of North American tour dates titled the Getting Killed Again Tour. This leg features a headlining show at the Forest Hills Stadium in Queens, New York making this the largest headlining Geese show to date. On October 21, the Band announced a second leg of the Getting Killed Again Tour in Australia and New Zealand, including a show at the Sydney Opera House.

== Critical reception ==
The tour has received positive reviews. Writing for Uproxx, Steven Hyden said "There might be bands that make more money or play bigger venues or garner better (or at least equally good) reviews in 2025. But in terms of juice — that intangible but indisputable feeling that you are witnessing a show you'll still be talking about in 10 or 20 or even more years — then it's hard to think of any act in the indie space that can touch Geese at the moment."

Writing for Consequence of Sound, Jonah Krueger said "In short, it's the best Geese have ever sounded. Fans old and new who are lucky enough to catch the band on their current run — or who are willing to shell out the spiking resale prices — are in store for a remarkably realized presentation of their vision performed in what might be the smallest batch of rooms they'll play in for years to come."

Writing about the New York City show at the Brooklyn Paramount in an article for Paste Magazine, Grace Robins-Somerville said "The greatest New York rock bands—from The New York Dolls to Suicide to Television to Talking Heads to TV On The Radio to the Yeah Yeah Yeahs—are ones whose work captures [New York City]'s contradictions, its incessant aliveness. Watching Geese close out their tour with a triumphant homecoming show felt like watching them throw their arms around the city that raised them—a city that feels like an entire universe."

== Set list ==
The following set list was obtained from the concert held on October 25, 2025, at the Hollywood Theatre in Vancouver, British Columbia. It does not represent all concerts for the duration of the tour.

1. "Husbands"
2. "Getting Killed"
3. "Islands of Men"
4. "100 Horses"
5. "Half Real"
6. "2122" (Included a short cover of "Down on the Street" by the Stooges)
7. "I See Myself"
8. "Cowboy Nudes"
9. "St. Elmo"
10. "Cobra"
11. "Bow Down"
12. "Au Pays du Cocaine"
13. "Taxes"

Encore

1. "Long Island City Here I Come"
2. "Trinidad"

== Tour dates ==
List of concerts from the Getting Killed Tour (2025-2026)
Date	City	Country	Venue	Opening acts
Leg 1 — North America
October 10, 2025	South Burlington	United States	Higher Ground Ballroom	Racing Mount Pleasant
October 11, 2025	Toronto	Canada	The Opera House	Racing Mount Pleasant
October 13, 2025	Detroit	United States	Majestic Theatre	Racing Mount Pleasant
October 15, 2025	Chicago	United States	Thalia Hall	Racing Mount Pleasant
October 16, 2025	Chicago	United States	Thalia Hall	Racing Mount Pleasant
October 17, 2025	Madison	United States	Majestic Theatre	Racing Mount Pleasant
October 18, 2025	St. Paul	United States	Amsterdam Bar & Hall	Racing Mount Pleasant
October 20, 2025	Denver	United States	Gothic Theatre	Racing Mount Pleasant
October 23, 2025 (Note: Show was added subsequently after the announcement of this leg of the tour.)	Bellingham	United States	Western Washington University Viking Union	Racing Mount Pleasant
October 24, 2025	Seattle	United States	The Showbox	Racing Mount Pleasant
October 25, 2025	Vancouver	Canada	Hollywood Theatre	Racing Mount Pleasant
October 26, 2025	Portland	United States	Wonder Ballroom	Racing Mount Pleasant
October 28, 2025	San Francisco	United States	The Fillmore	Racing Mount Pleasant
October 30, 2025	Los Angeles	United States	The Fonda Theatre	Racing Mount Pleasant
October 31, 2025	San Diego	United States	Quartyard	Dove Ellis
November 1, 2025	Phoenix	United States	Crescent Ballroom	Dove Ellis
November 4, 2025	Fort Worth	United States	Tulips	Dove Ellis
November 5, 2025	Austin	United States	Stubb's Waller Creek Amphitheatre	Dove Ellis
November 6, 2025	Houston	United States	White Oak Music Hall	Dove Ellis
November 8, 2025	Atlanta	United States	Terminal West	Dove Ellis
November 9, 2025	Asheville	United States	The Grey Eagle Music Hall	Dove Ellis
November 10, 2025	Carrboro	United States	Cat's Cradle	Dove Ellis
November 12, 2025	Washington, D.C.	United States	9:30 Club	Dove Ellis
November 13, 2025	Philadelphia	United States	Union Transfer	Dove Ellis
November 14, 2025	Boston	United States	Paradise Rock Club	Dove Ellis
November 15, 2025	Woodstock	United States	Levon Helm Studios	Dove Ellis
November 20, 2025	Brooklyn	United States	Brooklyn Paramount	Dove Ellis, Racing Mount Pleasant
November 21, 2025	Brooklyn	United States	Brooklyn Paramount	Dove Ellis, Racing Mount Pleasant
Leg 2 — Pacific
January 31, 2026	Honolulu	United States	The Republik	—N/a
February 5, 2026	Auckland	New Zealand	Laneway Festival	—N/a
February 7, 2026	Brisbane	Australia	Laneway Festival	—N/a
February 8, 2026	Sydney	Australia	Laneway Festival	—N/a
February 11, 2026	Sydney	Australia	The Metro Theatre	Radio Free Alice
February 12, 2026	Melbourne	Australia	Croxton Bandroom	Radio Free Alice
February 13, 2026	Melbourne	Australia	Laneway Festival	—N/a
February 14, 2026	Perth	Australia	Freo.Social	Radio Free Alice
February 19, 2026	Tokyo	Japan	Space Odd	—N/a
February 20, 2026	Tokyo	Japan	Space Odd	—N/a
Leg 3 — Europe
March 6, 2026	Paris	France	Le Bataclan	Westside Cowboy
March 7, 2026	Paris	France	La Cigale	Westside Cowboy
March 8, 2026	Brussels	Belgium	Botanique, Orangerie	Westside Cowboy
March 9, 2026	Nijmegen	Netherlands	Doornroosje	Westside Cowboy
March 11, 2026	Zurich	Switzerland	X-TRA	Westside Cowboy
March 12, 2026	Munich	Germany	Technikum	Westside Cowboy
March 13, 2026	Prague	Czech Republic	Lucerna Music Bar	Westside Cowboy
March 14, 2026	Berlin	Germany	Gretchen	Westside Cowboy
March 15, 2026	Berlin	Germany	Astra Kulturhaus	Westside Cowboy
March 16, 2026	Hamburg	Germany	Mojo Club	Westside Cowboy
March 17, 2026	Amsterdam	Netherlands	Paradiso	Westside Cowboy
March 18, 2026	Cologne	Germany	Kantine	Westside Cowboy
March 20, 2026	Bristol	England	The Prospect Building	Westside Cowboy
March 21, 2026	Glasgow	Scotland	Barrowland Ballroom	Westside Cowboy
March 22, 2026	Leeds	England	O2 Academy Leeds	Westside Cowboy
March 24, 2026	Manchester	England	Victoria Warehouse	Westside Cowboy
March 25, 2026	London	England	Hammersmith Apollo	Westside Cowboy
Leg 4 — Europe
August 19, 2026	Milan	Italy	Circolo Magnolia	—N/a
August 23, 2026	Cologne	Germany	Tanzbrunnen	Iceage
August 25, 2026	Glasgow	Scotland	Barrowland Ballroom	Skydaddy
August 26, 2026	Glasgow	Scotland	Barrowland Ballroom	Skydaddy
September 1, 2026	London	England	Troxy	Skydaddy
September 2, 2026	London	England	Troxy	Skydaddy

List of concerts from the Getting Killed Again Tour (2026-2027)
Date	City	Country	Venue	Opening acts
Leg 1 — North America
September 28, 2026	Nashville	United States	Ryman Auditorium	Gwenifer Raymond
September 29, 2026	Nashville	United States	Ryman Auditorium	Gwenifer Raymond
September 30, 2026	Asheville	United States	Hellbender	Gwenifer Raymond
October 2, 2026	Queens	United States	Forest Hills Stadium	Leenalchi
October 3, 2026	Queens	United States	Forest Hills Stadium	Billy Woods
October 6, 2026	Mexico City	Mexico	Teatro Metropólitan	Mariachi Oro de América
October 8, 2026	Phoenix	United States	Arizona Financial Theatre	Julianna Barwick
October 13, 2026	San Diego	United States	Gallagher Square	Bill Orcutt
October 15, 2026	Los Angeles	United States	Hollywood Forever Cemetery	Bill Orcutt
October 16, 2026	Los Angeles	United States	Hollywood Forever Cemetery	Bill Orcutt
October 17, 2026	Los Angeles	United States	Hollywood Forever Cemetery	Bill Orcutt
October 19, 2026	Oakland	United States	Fox Oakland Theatre	Bill Orcutt
October 20, 2026	Oakland	United States	Fox Oakland Theatre	Bill Orcutt
October 22, 2026	Seattle	United States	Paramount Theatre	Bill Orcutt
October 23, 2026	Seattle	United States	Paramount Theatre	Bill Orcutt
October 27, 2026	Salt Lake City	United States	Rockwell at the Complex	Easy Star All-Stars
October 28, 2026	Denver	United States	Mission Ballroom	Easy Star All-Stars
October 30, 2026	Kansas City	United States	Midland Theatre	Easy Star All-Stars
October 31, 2026	Chicago	United States	The Salt Shed	Easy Star All-Stars
November 1, 2026	Chicago	United States	The Salt Shed	Gwenifer Raymond
November 3, 2026	Toronto	Canada	History	Gwenifer Raymond
November 4, 2026	Toronto	Canada	History	Gwenifer Raymond
November 6, 2026	Washington, D.C.	United States	The Anthem	Gwenifer Raymond
November 7, 2026	Philadelphia	United States	The Fillmore Philadelphia	Cold Court, Gwenifer Raymond
November 8, 2026	Philadelphia	United States	The Fillmore Philadelphia	Cold Court, Gwenifer Raymond
November 10, 2026	Boston	United States	Roadrunner	Gwenifer Raymond
November 11, 2026	Boston	United States	Roadrunner	Gwenifer Raymond
November 13, 2026	Washington, D.C.	United States	The Anthem	Gwenifer Raymond
Leg 2 — Australia and New Zealand
February 25, 2027	Auckland	New Zealand	Te Paepae Theatre	—N/a
February 27, 2027	Brisbane	Australia	On the Banks	—N/a
March 2, 2027	Sydney	Australia	Sydney Opera House Forecourt	—N/a
March 3, 2027	Sydney	Australia	Sydney Opera House Forecourt	—N/a
March 5, 2027	Melbourne	Australia	Palace Foreshore	—N/a
March 6, 2027	Melbourne	Australia	Palace Foreshore	—N/a
