= Jonathan Club =

Southern California social club

Coordinates: 34.051517°N 118.258498°W

- Website: https://www.jc.org/

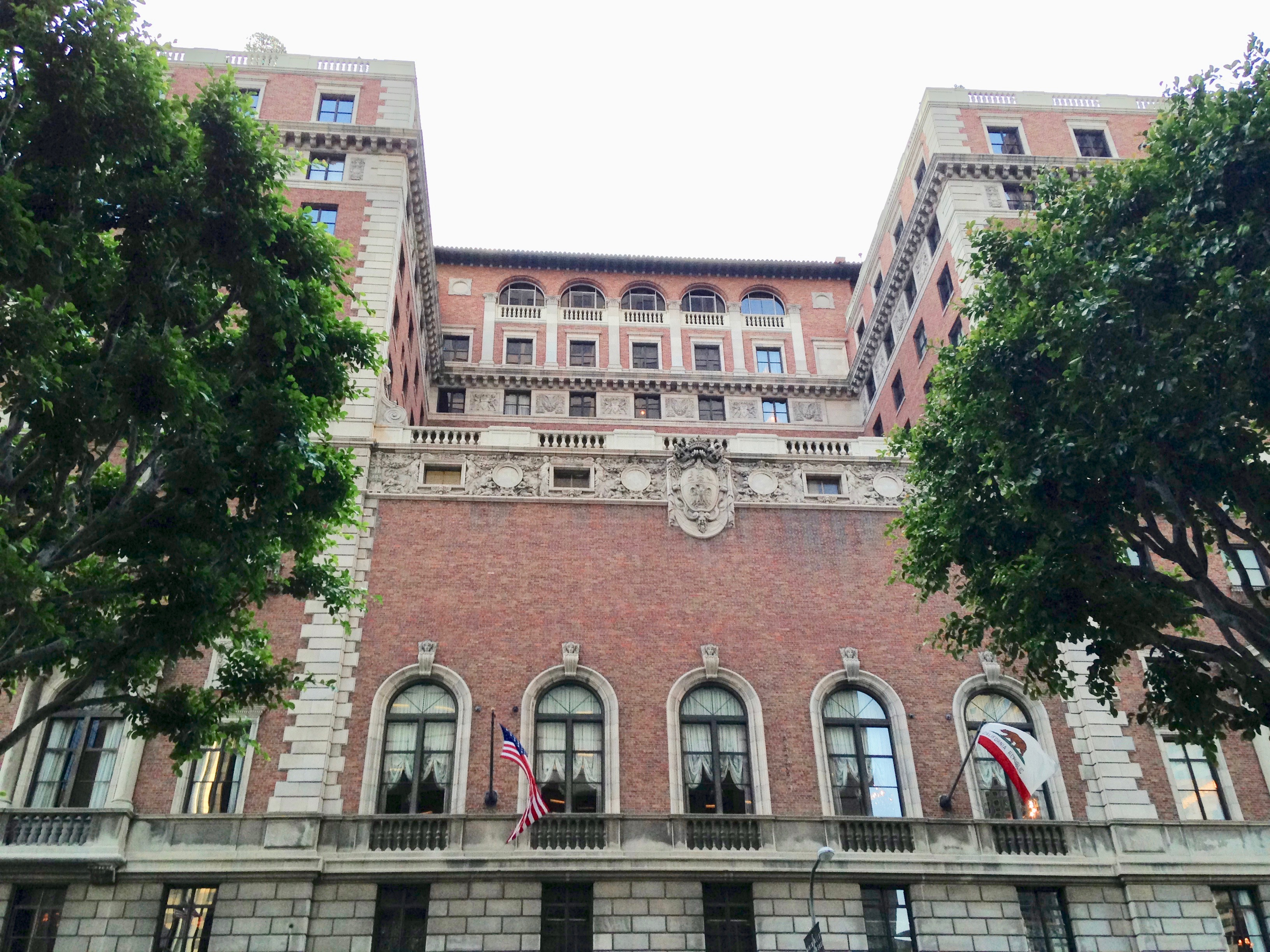
Downtown Los Angeles branch of in 2014

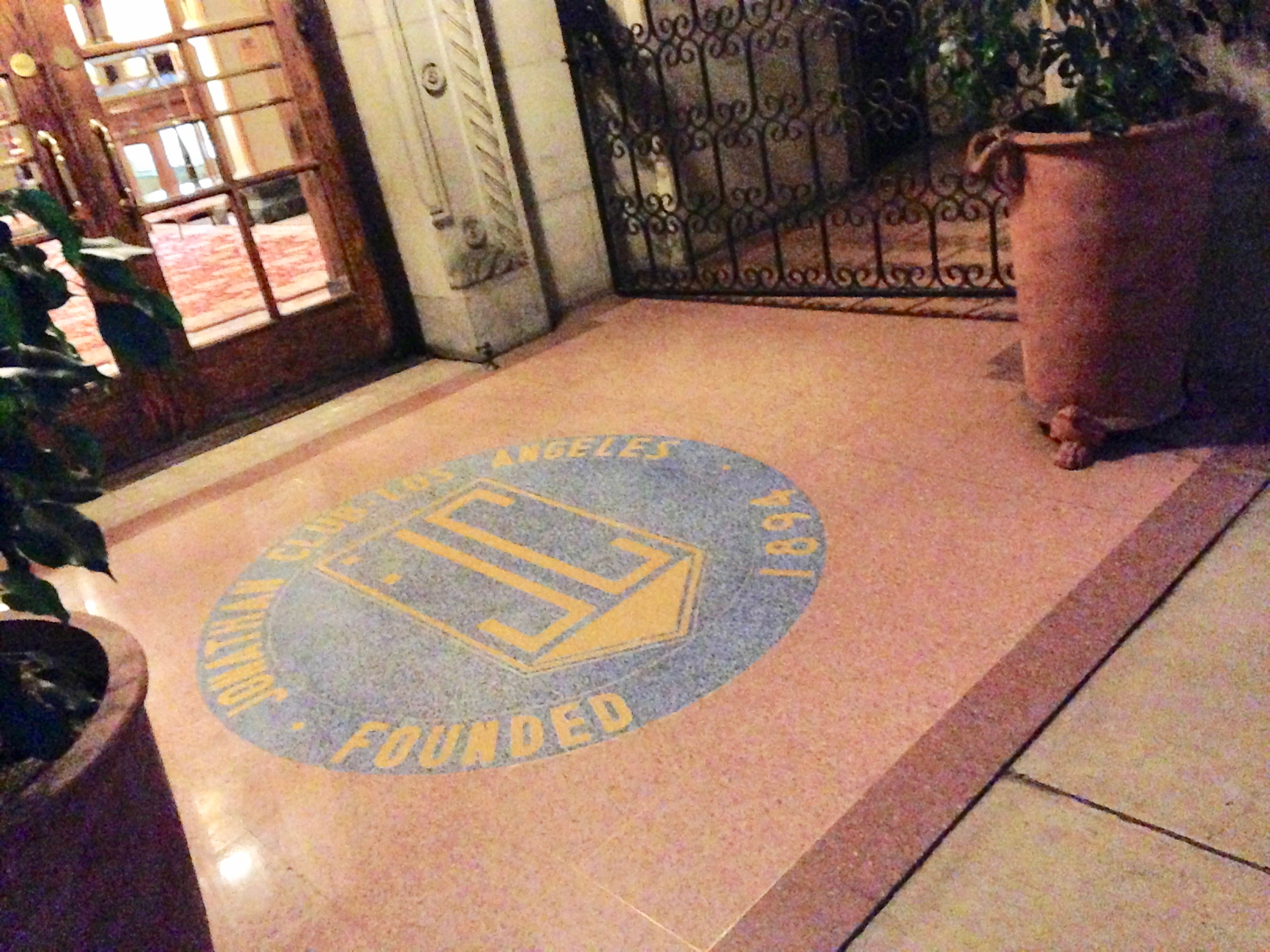
Entry terrazzo to the Jonathan Club

Jonathan Club is a social club with two California locations—one in Downtown Los Angeles and the other abutting the beach in Santa Monica. The club is routinely ranked as one of the top clubs in the world by Platinum Clubs of America. Membership is by invitation only. As of 2024 the initiation fee, which the club does not publicize, is around $50,000 with monthly membership dues in addition to this to remain in good standing.

== History ==
The club has two founding dates set in stone at the entrance to its Downtown Los Angeles building — 1894 (when it was a political club) and 1895 (when it segued into a non-political social club and was chartered by State of California). The club bases its anniversaries on the June 8, 1895 date.

For much of its history, the club was accused of discrimination. In 1965, the club was charged with "anti-Negro" and "anti-Jew" bias and a complaint was raised that the membership dues of Mayor Sam Yorty were being paid by city taxpayers to support such discrimination. Yorty told a news conference he knew nothing about such a circumstance. In 1975, the club did not admit women as members. Women guests were "limited to certain floors, dining rooms and entrances", though later policy changes allowed women to "use the main elevator and lobby" at the club. It voted to admit women in 1987, and today has more than 650 female members.

== The club today ==
The club provides dining, events, and athletic and wellness programs for members. Jonathan Club partners with the Congressional Medal of Honor Foundation and provides volunteers and funding to civic organization L.A. Works to combat homelessness.

The Jonathan Club operates under laws for 501(c)(7) Social and Recreation Clubs. In 2025 it reported $39,537,990 in total revenue and $74,314,831 in total assets. The Jonathan Club Charitable Fund is a 501(c)(3) Public Charity. In 2024 it reported total revenue of $672,720 and total assets of $4,919,373.

== Past and present members ==
Prominent members include:

- John D. Bicknell, founder of law firm that became Gibson, Dunn & Crutcher
- Herman Wolf Hellman, founder of Farmers & Merchants Bank; real estate investor
- Henry Huntington, railroad builder; land developer; rare art and book collector
- James Boon Lankershim, land developer
- John D. Spreckels, sugar and steamship entrepreneur
- Meredith Pinxton Snyder, banker; Los Angeles police chief, city councilman and mayor (three times)
- Peter Janss, developed East Los Angeles communities; philanthropist
- Edward Laurence Doheny, oilman
- Maurice Newmark, family built merchandise and grocery business into largest firm in Los Angeles
- Harry Chandler, publisher of the Los Angeles Times
- Mericos Hector Whittier, oil industry pioneer; land developer
- William Wrigley Jr., chewing gum magnate
- A.P. Giannini, founder of Bank of Italy (later Bank of America)
- Edgar Rice Burroughs, adventure and science fiction author
- Robert A. Millikan, experimental physicist; recipient of the Nobel Prize; longtime president of California Institute of Technology
- Admiral C.C. Bloch, commander of 14th Naval District during Dec. 7, 1941 attack on Pearl Harbor
- George Pepperdine, founded Western Auto Supply; philanthropist; endowed George Pepperdine College (later Pepperdine University)
- Jesse Louis Lasky, created first permanent feature film company in what would become Hollywood; a founder of Paramount Pictures
- Tom Mix, early Western movie star
- Gordon Bernie Kaufman, prominent architect
- Rear Admiral Isaac Campbell Kidd, career U.S. Naval officer who perished aboard USS Arizona in 1941 attack on Pearl Harbor; posthumously received Medal of Honor
- Earl Warren, governor of California; chief justice of U.S. Supreme Court
- Buster Keaton, silent screen star
- Hal Roach, comedy writer, director and producer; created Hal Roach Studios
- Harold Lloyd, comedy movie star in silents and talkies; founded own studio
- Edmund G. Brown, lawyer and politician; governor of California
- Paul Gray Hoffman, automobile executive; president of Ford Foundation; received Medal of Freedom for work as first administrator of Marshall Plan after WWII
- John A. McCone, industrialist; head of Atomic Energy Commission; director of CIA; headed McCone Commission to investigate causes of 1965 Watts riots and propose cures to avoid future outbreaks
- Ronald Reagan, movie actor; governor of California; president of the United States
- Arnold O. Beckman, prolific chemist and inventor; industrialist; funded first transistor company and fueled creation of Silicon Valley; philanthropist, including to Caltech where he studied and taught
- Peter O’Malley, owner and president of Los Angeles Dodgers

== Locations ==
In 1924, the Club opened its present location at 545 S. Figueroa Street, one block west of the Los Angeles Public Library.

Since 1927, the club has had a beach location in Santa Monica, in a building designed by architect Gene Verge, Sr.
