= Sound Off =

Sound Off may refer to:

- "Sound Off", a military cadence also known as "The Duckworth Chant"
- Sound Off (film), a 1952 comedy starring Mickey Rooney
- Sound Off (The Country Gentlemen album), 1971
- Sound Off (The Rubyz album)
- "Sound Off", an episode of Hi Hi Puffy AmiYumi
- "Sound Off" (song), a song by Trapt
- "Sound Off" (Vaughn Monroe song), a song by Vaughn Monroe
