= Kevian Kraemer =

American singer-songwriter (born 2006)

- Born: 2006 (age 19–20); Asbury Park, New Jersey, US
- Genres: Alternative pop; indie pop; pop rock
- Occupation: Musician
- Instruments: Vocals; guitar
- Years active: 2024–present
- Label: Atlantic Records
- Website: www.keviankraemer.com

Kevian Kraemer (born 2006) is an American singer-songwriter. His musical style includes genres such as indie pop, alternative pop, and pop-rock. In 2024, Kraemer released his debut EP, Seventeen.

== Early life ==
Kraemer was born in 2006 in Asbury Park, New Jersey. In his youth, he played drums, guitar, and sang in a band and later began playing as a session player in Asbury Park studios when he was 16. He was later picked up by a management company, Pala Management. He graduated from Manasquan High School in June 2024.

== Career ==
Upon graduating high school, Kraemer's self-released singles were distributed by Elektra Records. He later signed an album deal with Elektra and released his debut EP, Seventeen, through the label in 2024.

In 2025, he released his second EP, Jersey or Mars, under the Atlantic Records label. After the release, he went on his first national headline tour, the Jersey or Mars Tour.

He released his third EP, only if it matters, in 2026, under the Atlantic Records label.

In addition to his music, he also works as a songwriter.

== Public image ==
Kraemer cited artists like The Strokes, The Backseat Lovers, and Frank Ocean as his influences. His musical style has been described as covering indie and alternative pop, as well as pop-rock.

In 2025, he was listed in People magazine's Talented Emerging Artists for Your Fall Playlist and his third EP, only if it matters, was featured in NPR’s "Best Albums of the Week" list.

== Discography ==
=== EPs ===
- Seventeen (2024)
- Jersey or Mars (2025)
- only if it matters (2026)
