= Telephones (song) =

Single by Vacations

from the album Changes
- Released: 25 March 2018
- Label: WMG; Nettwerk
- Producers: Campbell Burns; Nate Delizzotti

Music video
- "Telephones" on YouTube

"Telephones" is a song by Australian indie rock Vacations and included on their debut studio album Changes (2018).

The title reveals a different layer: the world's unhealthy attachment to phones, further backed up by Campbell Burns in an interview with Cereal and Sounds "Telephones came from me staying up way too late before going to bed just scrolling through Instagram’s explore tag during a period when I was feeling down".

Following the songs release, it would gain virality on TikTok.

The song was certified platinum by both the Australian Recording Industry Association (ARIA), and the Recording Industry Association of America (RIAA).

== Certifications ==
Certifications
Region	Certification	Certified units/sales
Australia (ARIA)	Platinum	70,000^{‡}
Canada (Music Canada)	Platinum	80,000^{‡}
France (SNEP)	Gold	100,000^{‡}
New Zealand (RMNZ)	Platinum	30,000^{‡}
United Kingdom (BPI)	Silver	200,000^{‡}
United States (RIAA)	Platinum	1,000,000^{‡}
^{‡} Sales+streaming figures based on certification alone.
