= The Rubyz (album) =

Studio album by The Rubyz
- Released: April 1, 2008
- Recorded: 2007
- Genre: Teen pop, Christian pop
- Length: 35:00
- Label: iShine, Advocate
- Producer: Chris Omartian

The Rubyz chronology
| The Rubyz (2008) | Sound Off (2009) |

Professional ratings
Review scores
| Source | Rating |
|---|---|
| Jesus Freak Hideout | 4/5 stars |
| New Release Tuesday | 3/5 stars |

The Rubyz is the debut album by the American Christian teen pop girl group, The Rubyz. The album was released on April 1, 2008, and tracks from the album, including "Outrageous," were featured on Radio Disney. Additionally, the album peaked at No. 26 on the Christian Albums chart published by Billboard.

== Track listing ==
| No. | Title | Length |
|---|---|---|
| 1. | "Staring at the Sun" | 3:43 |
| 2. | "Outrageous" | 2:40 |
| 3. | "Time of My Life" | 2:43 |
| 4. | "In My Life (I Don't Wanna)" | 3:17 |
| 5. | "Thirteen" | 3:33 |
| 6. | "We Shine" | 4:29 |
| 7. | "Baila Chiquita" | 3:11 |
| 8. | "We Got Da Beat" (The Go-Go's cover) | 2:53 |
| 9. | "Just Like You" | 3:14 |
| 10. | "Umbrella" (Rihanna cover) | 3:50 |

== Music videos ==
- "Thirteen"

== Personnel ==
- Alexis Slifer - vocals
- Cammie Hall - vocals
- Marissa Milele - vocals
