= No Place Like Home (Vacations album) =

Studio album by Vacations
- Released: 12 January 2024
- Genre: Indie rock
- Length: 32:43
- Label: No Fun
- Producers: John Velasquez; Campbell Burns

Vacations chronology
Forever in Bloom (2020)	No Place Like Home (2024)	Vacations on Audiotree Live (2025)

Singles from No Place Like Home
- 1. "Next Exit" Released: 14 April 2023; 2. "Midwest" Released: 9 June 2023; 3. "Terms & Conditions" Released: 28 July 2023; 4. "Close Quarters" Released: 20 October 2023

No Place Like Home is the third studio album by Australian Indie Rock band Vacations, released on 12 January 2024 through No Fun Records. Recorded in Los Angeles where the band recently relocated, the album is lyrically informed by frontman Campbell Burns' diagnosis for obsessive–compulsive disorder.

== Background and recording ==
Lead songwriter and vocalist of Vacations, Campbell Burns, said he had suffered with writer's block for two to three years preceding the album's release. He said this experience was linked to his journey receiving therapy and being diagnosed with obsessive–compulsive disorder. Songs on No Place Like Home were composed as Burns listened back to voice recordings from his phone that he recorded while traveling through the United States. The album was recorded in Los Angeles.

== Release and promotion ==
The album was preceded by four singles. "Next Exit" was released as the lead single alongside a music video on 14 April 2023. Written off the back of two international circuits in the United States and Mexico, it was Vacations' first new song since their 2020 album Forever in Bloom. The second single, "Midwest", was issued on 9 June, coinciding with the announcement of Tourzilla, a joint tour across North America with Last Dinosaurs. On 28 July, the third single "Terms & Conditions" was released. Vacations announced the album's title, release date and track listing on 20 October 2023 alongside the issue of the fourth and final single "Close Quarters".

== Reception ==
Professional ratings
Review scores
Source	Rating
The Australian	3.5/5 stars
Clunk	4/5 stars

No Place Like Home was received positively by reviewers. Writing for The Australian, Doug Wallen said despite Campbell's relatable but emotionally heavy subjects, "the music's lighter and brighter delivery drives ever closer to what feels like resolution". Issy Packer of English music publication Clunk called the record a "fun-filled, adventurous album from a very exciting band", particularly praising Burns' vocal performances and the emotional themes on display.

== Track listing ==
All tracks are written by Vacations with additional writing by John Velasquez.

No.	Title	Length
1.	"Next Exit"	3:21
2.	"Slow Motion"	3:34
3.	"No Place Like Home"	3:25
4.	"Over You"	2:26
5.	"Midwest"	4:08
6.	"Arizona"	2:00
7.	"Close Quarters"	3:40
8.	"Off-Season"	3:04
9.	"Terms & Conditions"	4:04
10.	"Lost in Translation"	2:56

== Personnel ==
Vacations

- Campbell Burns – vocals, production, mixing, engineering
- Jake Johnson – bass guitar
- Nate Delizzotti – guitar
- Joseph Van Lier – drums

Additional contributors

- John Velasquez – guitar, production, mixing, engineering
- Teleah Riordan – saxophone
- Alex Riordan – backing vocals
- Daniel Chae – violin
- Jy-Perry Banks – lap steel
- Clint Topic – additional engineering
- Gab Strum – additional co-production on "Slow Motion"
- Nick Ward – additional co-production on "Terms & Conditions" and "Lost in Translation"
