= Freak Slug =

British indie rock musician

Xenya Genovese, known by her stage name Freak Slug, is a British indie rock musician from Manchester.

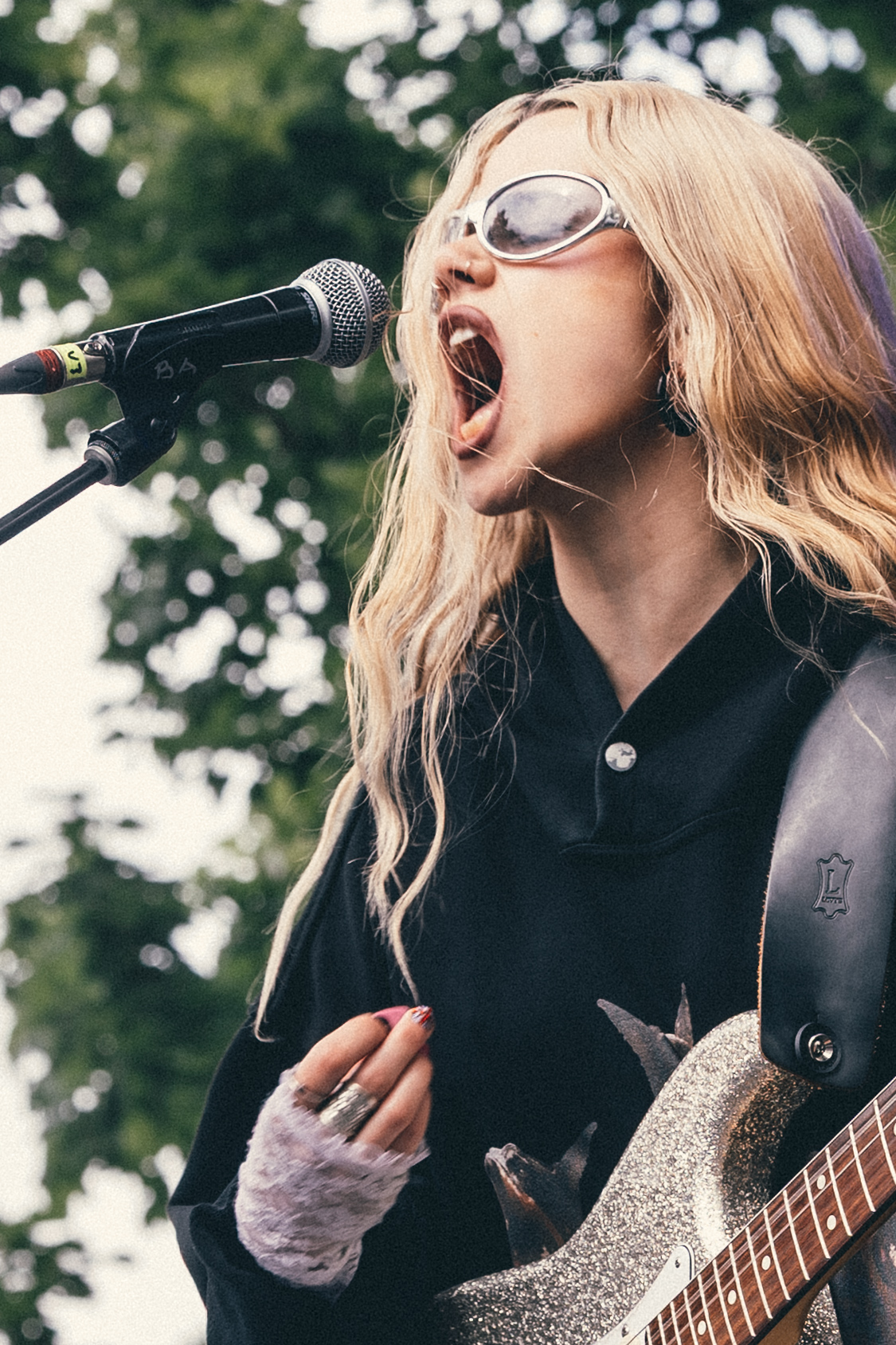
Freak Slug performing at Kilby Block Party 2026 in Salt Lake City, Utah.

== Career ==
Genovese released her debut EP, Slow Down Babe, in 2021. Genovese released her second EP in 2022 titled I'm In Love. In 2023, Genovese released her third EP under the Freak Slug moniker titled Viva la Vulva. Genovese announced her debut studio album, I Blow Out Big Candles, in September 2024 and released it in November. In July 2026, Genovese released "Girl, Intentions" as the lead single for her second album, Amulet, which was released on 18 September 2026.

== Discography ==
Studio albums

- I Blow Out Big Candles (2024)
- Amulet (2026)

EPs

- Slow Down Babe (2021)
- I'm in Love (2022)
- Viva la Vulva (2023)
