= Dove Ellis =

Irish indie folk musician

- At Mutations Festival Brighton, UK, 24 October 2026

Background information
- Also known as: Donohue
- Born: Thomas O'Donoghue; 2002 or 2003 (age 22–23)
- Origin: Moycullen, County Galway, Ireland
- Genre: Indie folk
- Instruments: Vocals; guitar
- Labels: Black Butter; AMF
- Website: doveellis.com

Thomas O'Donoghue (born 2002 or 2003), better known by his stage name Dove Ellis, is an Irish indie folk musician.

== Career ==
Ellis released his first single as a solo artist, "To the Sandals", in 2025. The song was named a Best New Song of the Week by Paste.

Later that same year, Ellis announced his debut studio album, Blizzard, which was released on 5 December 2025 on Black Butter and AMF Records. In conjunction with the album's announcement, Ellis released two additional singles, "Love Is" and "Pale Song". "Love Is" was also named one of the Best New Songs of the Week by Paste. Blizzard received universal acclaim upon release, with The Economist including it in their top 10 albums of 2025 and describing the album as "a fabulous summation of his promise." Blizzard was later nominated for the 35th Mercury Prize.

Ellis opened for Geese on their Getting Killed World Tour. Ellis recorded a session in St. James' Church for Other Voices in November 2025.

In October 2026 Ellis' song "Heaven Has No Wings" was nominated for the 'Best Original Folk Track' award in the 8th RTÉ Radio 1 Folk Awards, 2026.

== Discography ==
=== Studio albums ===
Title	Details	Peak chart positions
Title	Details	IRE Indie
Blizzard	Released: December 5, 2025; Label: Black Butter, AMF; Format: digital download, streaming, LP, CD	6

=== EPs ===
Title	Details
To the Sandals	Released: October 21, 2024; Label: Self-released; Format: CD, digital download, streaming

=== Singles ===
Title	Details
"To the Sandals"	Released: September 10, 2025; Label: Black Butter, AMF; Format: digital download, streaming
"Pale Song" / "Love Is"	Released: October 22, 2025; Label: Black Butter, AMF; Format: digital download, streaming
