= Gene Verge Sr. =

American architect

Gene Verge Sr. (April 7, 1893- August 27, 1953) was a Canadian-born American architect.

== Early life ==
Gene Verge Sr. was born in Canada on April 7, 1893. He graduated from the École des beaux-arts de Montréal.

== Career ==
Verge moved to Los Angeles, California and started working for the Pozzo Construction Co.

In 1934, Verge designed the 13.4-acre St Luke's Hospital, also known as the St. Luke Medical Center, located at 2632 East Washington Boulevard in Bungalow Heaven, Pasadena, California. It is a mix of art deco and Spanish Colonial Revival architecture. It was designated as a City Landmark in 2002. In 2007, it was purchased by DS Ventures, a real estate developer.

Verge designed the building of the Jonathan Club in Santa Monica, California. He also designed homes in Beverly Hills, California, including an X-shaped property for actor Buster Keaton (1895-1966). In the early 1950s, he designed St. Bartholomew School in Long Beach, California.

== Death ==
Verge died on August 27, 1953, in Los Angeles, California.
