= Young (Vacations song) =

Single by Vacations

from the album Vibes
- Released: 2016
- Length: 3:09
- Label: Campbell Burns
- Producer: Campbell Burns

Music video
- "Young" on YouTube

"Young" is a song by Australian indie rock Vacations and included on their second EP Vibes (2016).

== Background and performance ==
In mid-2020, TikTok users began playing the song, associating the track with Skins character Cassie. In July 2020, frontman Campbell Burns said "We've seen that surge on our Spotify and other streaming sites. Our listeners have just skyrocketed and that song has just blown up more-so… It's overtaken 'Relax', which has been our longest standing song. It's actually kind of nice another song knocked that off. We're gaining all these new fans, and this newfound appreciation."

The music video was released in December 2020.

The song was certified gold in the United States in March 2022, platinum in February 2023 and double platinum in May 2025.

== Certifications ==
Certifications for "Young"
Region	Certification	Certified units/sales
Australia (ARIA)	Platinum	70,000^{‡}
Canada (Music Canada)	2× Platinum	160,000^{‡}
France (SNEP)	Gold	100,000^{‡}
New Zealand (RMNZ)	Platinum	30,000^{‡}
Poland (ZPAV)	Gold	25,000^{‡}
United Kingdom (BPI)	Silver	200,000^{‡}
United States (RIAA)	2× Platinum	2,000,000^{‡}
^{‡} Sales+streaming figures based on certification alone.
