= It Goes On =

Studio album by Westside Cowboy
- Released: 21 August 2026
- Recorded: Greenmount Studios (Leeds)
- Genre: Indie rock
- Length: 35:05
- Label: Island
- Producer: Loren Humphrey

Westside Cowboy chronology
So Much Country 'Till We Get There (2026)	It Goes On (2026)

It Goes On is the debut studio album by the English rock band Westside Cowboy. It was released on 21 August 2026 by Island Records. The band recorded most of the album at Greenmount Studios in Leeds with the producer Loren Humphrey; two songs use recordings made during pre-production at Humphrey's home in Upstate New York. They intended the record to sound youthful and immediate, retaining the two-guitar, bass-and-drums foundation and shared lead vocals of their concerts.

Critics described It Goes On as indie rock, with elements of alternative country, folk, post-punk, rockabilly and 1990s alternative rock. The lyrics address the passage of time, repetition, uncertainty and young adulthood; the recurring idea of motion led the band to choose the title after the songs had been completed.

The album was preceded by the singles "Kick Stones (The Boys)", "Pin Up Boys" and "Dobro". It received critical acclaim, with reviewers particularly praising the band's energy and ability to reinvigorate familiar guitar-rock styles. Metacritic assigned it a weighted score of 88 out of 100, and Stereogum selected it as its Album of the Week.

== Background ==
Westside Cowboy formed in Manchester in 2023. Reuben Haycocks, Aoife Anson-O'Connell and Paddy Murphy met while studying at the Royal Northern College of Music, and Murphy had previously performed with Jimmy Bradbury in a surf-punk group. The four initially gathered to socialise and play Lonnie Donegan covers. During their writing process, each member contributed songs, the lead vocalist changed between tracks, and arrangements were designed around two guitars, bass and drums. The band called its mixture of British rock and American folk and alternative music "Britainicana", initially as a way to distinguish itself from Manchester's contemporary post-punk groups.

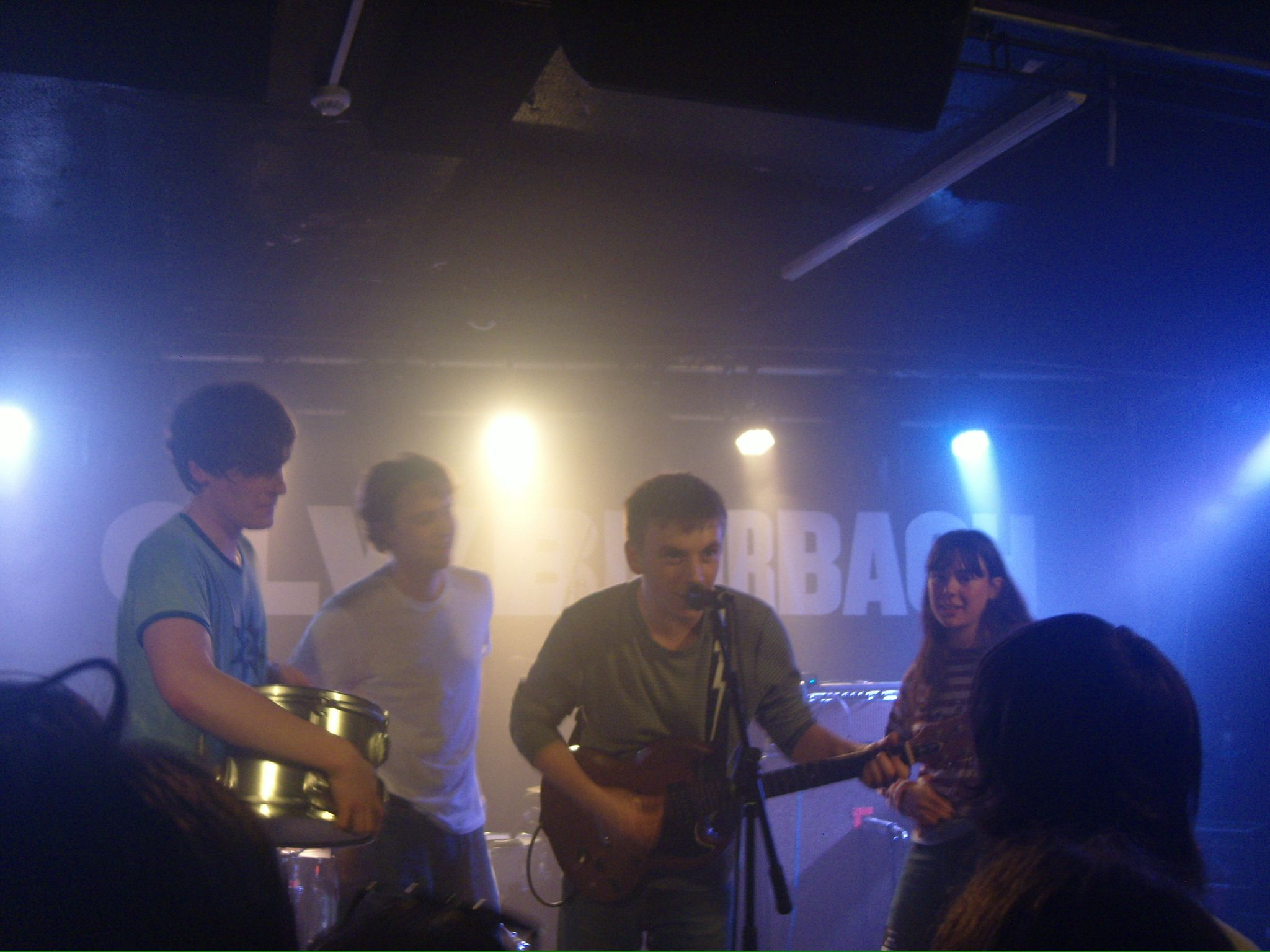
Westside Cowboy performing in November 2025

The band released two EPs, This Better Be Something Great (2025) and So Much Country 'Till We Get There (2026). Their profile rose after they won the 2025 Glastonbury Festival Emerging Talent Competition, opened European concerts for Geese, and appeared on Later... with Jools Holland. Their local performances eventually attracted Loren Humphrey's attention. He produced their second EP before agreeing to make their debut album. By the time album sessions began, "Pin Up Boys" and "Kick Stones (The Boys)" had been extensively tested in performance.

== Writing and recording ==
The group said that it conceived It Goes On as an album for their younger selves and wanted the songs to be concise, immediate and imperfect rather than ornate. They told Rolling Stone UK that they treated human imperfections as part of the performances. Humphrey said he had been attracted by their ability to keep accelerating a song towards a climax without losing control, and sought to keep that quality in the studio. Most of the record was made at Greenmount Studios in Leeds. Humphrey produced, engineered and mixed it, Rob Slater provided additional recording engineering, and Felix Davis mastered it. Mixing took place at Magic Mountain in Tuxedo Park, New York, and mastering at Metropolis Studios in London.

Several songs changed considerably during the sessions. Haycocks had come to dislike "Kick Stones (The Boys)" after repeated live performances and initially opposed including it. The band and Humphrey reduced what had become a large concert arrangement to a more restrained build, using a live performance of the Velvet Underground's "What Goes On" as a reference. Haycocks subsequently called the result the album's sonic touchstone. "Pin Up Boys", by contrast, was recorded largely as the group played it live. It was the third attempt to record the song; the band attributed the final take's abrasive sound to its frustration with the process. The final two tracks keep recordings from pre-production at Humphrey's New York home. "Take My Leaving as I Love You" is an early, stripped-down take that the other members insisted on keeping, while "You Could Have Died There on the Dancefloor" combines an early demo with replacement vocals.

The material came from different stages of the band's development. Bradbury wrote "Dobro" quickly on a four-track cassette recorder after a tour, and Murphy described its relaxed rhythm as the band's first attempt at a song that strutted. Haycocks wrote "Well Done Kid, You Did It" while forcing himself to complete a song each day because he felt anxious about composing an album. Listening to Modest Mouse, the group developed it as what Haycocks termed an "emo dance track". "Worried Age" began as a ten-minute piece influenced by LCD Soundsystem and New Order before the group shortened it. As they completed the song, Future Islands' In Evening Air became a reference for it.

After completing the songs, the band noticed repeated images of movement and the passage of time. Haycocks said it was not intended as a concept album, but those connections made the title It Goes On fit. Bradbury described "Big Wheels" as a song about repetition and feeling trapped by limited choices, and Haycocks called "Worried Age" an attempt to capture the group's age and circumstances while it was being written. The closing lyric of "You Could Have Died There on the Dancefloor" asks to be accepted despite imperfection; Murphy said its quiet optimism made it an appropriate ending.

== Music and lyrics ==
Victoria Borlando of Pitchfork noted about the album's music and lyrics that "The much-hyped Manchester group sheds some of its early country influences, focusing instead on tightly wound indie rock and sharp, thoughtful songwriting. It’s a winning combination." Connor Gilroy of The Alternative said that it "ultimately feels closer to a louder more frenetic future for slacker rock than alt-country". Rishi Shah of NME treated it as a summary of the alternative-country, indie and rockabilly styles that had shaped the band. Tom Breihan of Stereogum heard 1990s indie rock in its monotone vocals, interlocking guitars and shouted harmonies, while Luke Nuttall of the Soundboard identified post-punk and American roots influences rather than the Britpop revivalism associated with some Manchester bands. Marissa R. Moss of Rolling Stone UK described the arrangements as forceful and noted their frequent climaxes.

The three members who play guitar or bass alternate as lead singers: Haycocks leads seven tracks, Bradbury three and Anson-O'Connell one, with the other members frequently credited with backing vocals. Critics repeatedly singled out Murphy's drumming as the force behind the builds. Nuttall contrasted its agitation on "Kick Stones (The Boys)" and "Worried Age" with the more chaotic ending of "Paper Chains", while Alexander Ralston of the Skinny described a recurring structure in which instruments accumulate until a melody lifts the arrangement and it stops abruptly. The more forceful songs are interrupted by a quieter sequence late in the record. Anson-O'Connell described "Coyote" as a sparse, percussion-led and unusually angry song. Shah read the album's ordinary imagery as a response to young-adult uncertainty.

== Release and promotion ==
Westside Cowboy announced It Goes On on 20 May 2026 and released "Kick Stones (The Boys)" as its lead single. Its video was made with the football club F.C. United of Manchester. "Pin Up Boys" followed on 1 July. The band said it had been written about eighteen months earlier with an acoustic guitar, a drum-machine sample pad and screwdrivers used as drumsticks; repeated performances made the arrangement heavier before the album version was recorded. Jack Shep directed a video in which a moving spotlight pursues a runner and successively reveals different versions of the band. The third advance single, "Dobro", was released on 6 August. The album was released on 21 August 2026 through Island Records. The band announced a series of in-store performances around the release date and scheduled a headline tour of the United Kingdom and continental Europe for October to December.

== Critical reception ==
Professional ratings
Aggregate scores
Source	Rating
Any Decent Music	8.3/10
Metacritic	87/100
Review scores
Source	Rating
DIY	4.5/5 stars
musicOMH	4.5/5 stars
NME	4/5 stars
Paste	A
Pitchfork	7.8
Rolling Stone UK	5/5 stars
The Skinny	4/5 stars

It Goes On received critical acclaim. On Metacritic, which normalises reviews from professional publications to a 100-point score, it has a weighted average of 87 based on 16 reviews, a result the site classifies as "universal acclaim". On Any Decent Music, it has a weighted average score of 8.3 out of 10 from seventeen critic scores.

Tom Breihan named It Goes On Stereogum's Album of the Week. Although he traced its ingredients to earlier indie-rock groups, he thought the band's enthusiasm prevented those references from becoming pastiche; he particularly praised its controlled builds, overlapping voices and combination of confidence and anxiety. Nick Reilly of Rolling Stone UK similarly wrote that the record transcended the band's "Britainicana" label, highlighting the wall of sound in "Kick Stones", the balladry of "Take My Leaving as I Love You" and the looseness of "Pin Up Boys". Matt Mitchell graded the album A for Paste, identifying the musicians' friendship and Murphy's drumming as the foundation of its intensity. Rishi Shah awarded it four stars for NME, connecting its acceptance of flaws with uncertainty in early adulthood.

Other reviewers concentrated on the consistency of its arranging method. Daisy Carter of DIY and John Murphy of MusicOMH each awarded four and a half stars. Carter praised its deliberately rough production, dynamic shifts and harmonies, while Murphy thought the album successfully transferred the band's live sound to the studio and highlighted its vocal interplay and drumming. Liam Martin of AllMusic considered the repeated crescendos mostly earned and thought the quiet songs retained the emotional directness of the louder material, although he found that the band took few large formal risks. Alexander Ralston gave the album four stars for The Skinny, finding its repeated pattern of gradual accumulation mostly irresistible and its brief songs well paced. He nevertheless thought "Pin Up Boys" overindulged that method and found parts of "Paper Chains" dreary before its instrumentation opened out. Todd Dedman of Beats Per Minute rated the album 83 per cent, but called "Big Wheels" a misstep whose borrowed phrases interrupted the record's momentum. Hopper Ho of The Mancunion claims the album pioneers a new era of British indie music, and that the album "has your body flailing and your heart aching."

== Track listing ==
All tracks are written by Aoife Anson-O'Connell, Jimmy Bradbury, Reuben Haycocks and Paddy Murphy

It Goes On track listing
No.	Title	Length
1.	"Kick Stones (The Boys)"	3:56
2.	"Paper Chains"	2:51
3.	"Dobro"	2:45
4.	"Well Done Kid, You Did It"	3:27
5.	"Worried Age"	3:58
6.	"Big Wheels"	3:17
7.	"Pin Up Boys"	2:45
8.	"Coyote"	3:18
9.	"Patchwork"	3:22
10.	"Take My Leaving as I Love You"	2:43
11.	"You Could Have Died There on the Dancefloor"	2:43
Total length:		35:05

== Personnel ==
Adapted from the album's liner notes.

=== Westside Cowboy ===
- Reuben Haycocks – lead vocals (All except 3, 6, 9), guitar, backing vocals, photos
- Jimmy Bradbury – Lead vocals (3, 6, 9), guitar, backing vocals, photos
- Aoife Anson-O'Connell – lead vocals (8), bass guitar, backing vocals, piano (9), keyboards (6, 10), cello (6), photos
- Paddy Murphy – drums, percussion, backing vocals, toy piano (6, 8), keyboards (3, 5, 7, 10), photos

=== Technical ===
- Loren Humphrey – production, mixing, recording engineering, percussion (except 9, 10), synths (1, 4, 5, 11), piano (2, 3, 6, 11), photos
- Rob Slater – recording engineering (1–9, 11)
- Felix Davis – mastering
- Liselotte Denis – footsteps (9), photos

=== Artwork ===
- Clémentine Schneider – artwork photography
- Ginny Davies – creative direction and design

== Charts ==
Chart performance for It Goes On
Chart (2026)	Peak position
Belgian Albums (Ultratop Flanders)	91
Belgian Albums (Ultratop Wallonia)	67
Dutch Vinyl Albums (Dutch Charts)	22
French Physical Albums (SNEP)	51
French Rock & Metal Albums (SNEP)	18
UK Albums (Official Charts)	5
