= Vacations (band) =

Australian indie rock band

- Origin: Newcastle, New South Wales, Australia
- Genres: Indie rock; indie pop; jangle pop; lo-fi
- Years active: 2015–present
- Labels: Believe; No Fun, Nettwerk
- Members: Campbell Burns; Jake Johnson; Nate Delizzotti; Joseph Van Lier
- Website: vacationsband.com

Vacations is an Australian indie rock band formed in 2015 in Newcastle. The group consists of lead songwriter and vocalist Campbell Burns, bassist Jake Johnson, lead guitarist Nate Delizzotti and drummer Joseph Van Lier. In March 2024, Esquire called Vacations "Australia's greatest boy band".

Vacations curated the 2024 festival MATES, held in Los Angeles, featuring Puma Blue, Claud, Yot Club, Ian Sweet, Kacy Hill, Jaguar Jonze, and Waax. Vacations have performed at festivals like 2025's Harvest Rock BottleRock, Kilby Block Party, 2024's Portside Festival, Outlandia Festival, London Calling, 2023's All Things Go, All Points East, 2022's Austin City Limits, and in 2018, SXSW.

== History ==
=== 2015: Formation and early history ===
After leaving Newcastle High School, Burns began writing and recording "sad boy songs" and posting them to his Tumblr account. His friend Jake Johnson heard the tracks and the two started creating music alongside Nate Delizzotti and Joseph Van Lier, forming Vacations in 2015.

They describe their sound as "woozy guitar pop", combining indie pop with elements of jangle and lo-fi. With the release of their EPs, Days in 2015 and Vibes in 2016, Vacations started gaining a following on SoundCloud and YouTube.

=== 2016–2022: Changes ===
In 2018, they released their debut studio album Changes. The single "Telephones" is certified Platinum in the US. The band recorded and published their first two EP's and their debut studio album by themselves with no management nor PR. Their sophomore album, Forever in Bloom, was released in 2020.

In April 2022, their single "Young" from 2016 went viral from a TikTok trend, when fans used the song to soundtrack scenes from series Skins, featuring the character Cassie. "Young" was certified gold in the United States, Canada and Poland. It has over 420 million streams as of June 2023 and placed the band on Australia's most-played artists on Spotify.

=== 2023-present: No Place Like Home to Pursuit of Anything ===
In mid-2023, Burns moved to Los Angeles, saying that "[t]here's a lot more going on in the [United] States for the band right now compared to Australia". The move as well as his diagnosis with obsessive–compulsive disorder, influenced the themes of the band's third studio album, No Place Like Home, released in January 2024.

In 2024, Vacations was named as one of Pandora's "Artists to Watch" in the rock category. They made their American television debut on CBS Morning's Saturday Sessions in 2024, performing "Next Exit" and a few weeks later, on Jimmy Kimmel Live. "Next Exit" has 2.6 million views on YouTube. Vacations performed "Midwest" on The Late Show with Stephen Colbert.

In May 2026, the group announced their fourth studio album Pursuit of Anything. The album was released on 2 October 2026.

== Discography ==
=== Albums ===
Albums
Title	Album details	Peak chart positions
Title	Album details	AUS
Changes	Released: 25 March 2018; Format: CD, cassette, digital; Label: Human Sounds	—
Forever in Bloom	Released: 18 September 2020; Format: CD, LP, digital; Label: No Fun, Believe	—
No Place Like Home	Released: 12 January 2024; Format: CD, LP, digital; Label: No Fun, Nettwerk	—
Pursuit of Anything	Released: 2 October 2026; Format: CD, LP, digital; Label: No Fun, Nettwerk	80

=== Extended plays ===
EPs
Title	Album details
Days	Released: 22 August 2015; Format: CD, digital; Label: Campbell Burns
Vibes	Released: 9 December 2016; Format: CD, digital; Label: Campbell Burns
Vacations on Audiotree Live	Released: 21 May 2025; Format: digital; Label: Vacations, Audiotree Music

=== Certified singles ===
Certified Singles
Title	Album	Certification
"Relax"	Vibes	RIAA: Gold
"Young"	Vibes	ARIA: Platinum; BPI: Silver; MC: Gold; RIAA: 2× Platinum; RMNZ: Platinum; SNEP: Gold; ZPAV: Gold
"Telephones"	Changes	ARIA: Platinum; BPI: Silver; MC: Platinum; RMNZ: Platinum; RIAA: Platinum; SNEP: Gold

== Awards and nominations ==
=== Rolling Stone Australia Awards ===
The Rolling Stone Australia Awards are awarded annually by the Australian edition of Rolling Stone magazine for outstanding contributions to popular culture in the previous year.

Year	Nominee / work	Award	Result	Ref.
2024	Vacations	Rolling Stone Global Award	Nominated	
