= Westside Cowboy =

English rock band

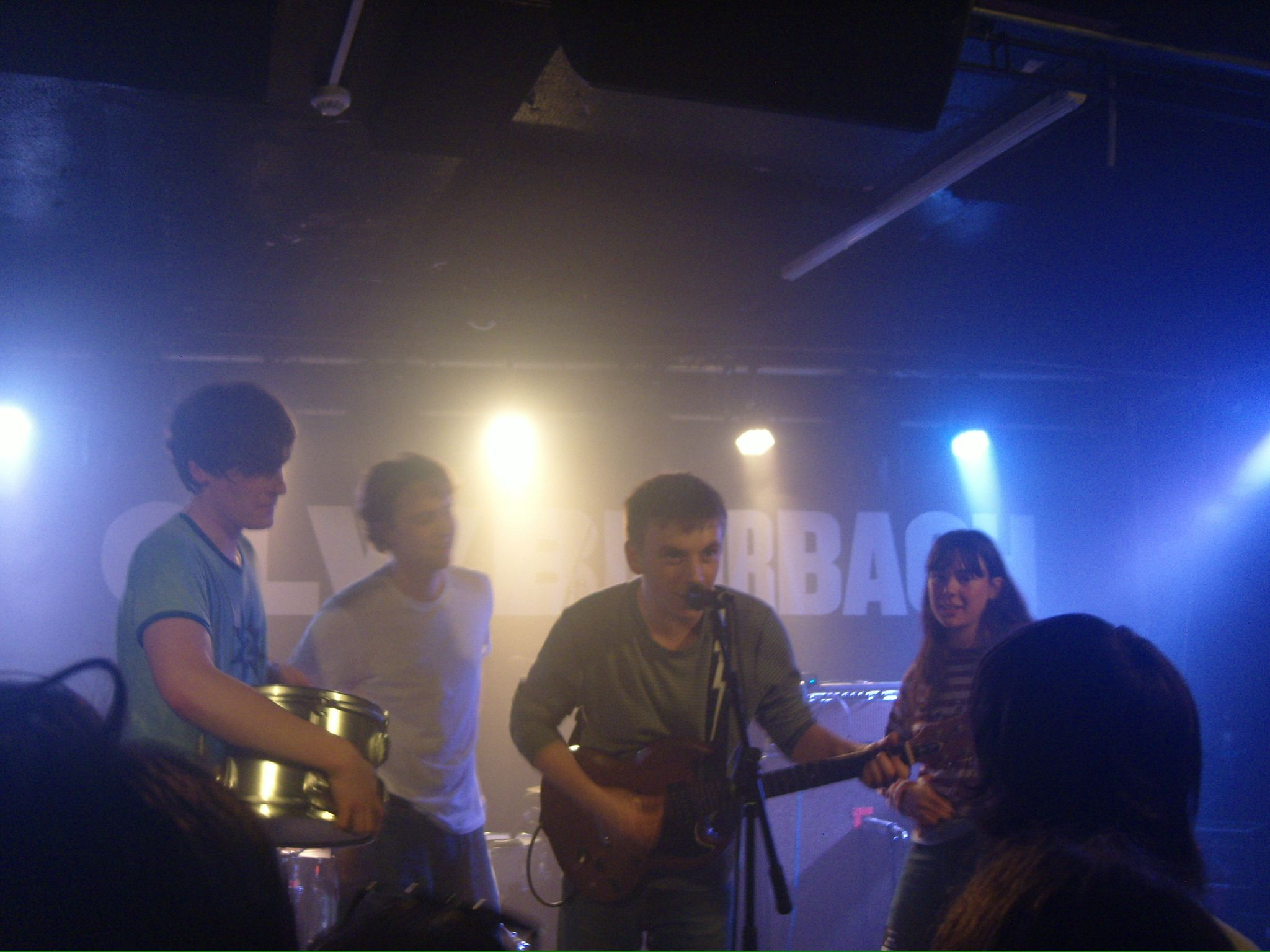
- Westside Cowboy performing in 2025

Background information
- Origin: Manchester, England
- Genres: Alternative rock; indie rock; Americana; alternative country
- Years active: 2023–present
- Labels: Nice Swan; Heist or Hit; Island
- Members: Jimmy Bradbury; Reuben Haycocks; Aoife Anson O'Connell; Paddy Murphy
- Website: westsidecowboy.com

Westside Cowboy are an English rock band formed in Manchester in 2023. The band members are Jimmy Bradbury (vocals, guitar), Reuben Haycocks (vocals, guitar), Aoife Anson O'Connell (vocals, bass) and Paddy Murphy (vocals, drums).

The band won Glastonbury's Emerging Talent Competition in 2025.

== History ==
The band formed after meeting at the Royal Northern College of Music in Manchester. After playing in other bands like Miranda Sound, Haycocks and Murphy in a noise pop group named DieKaiDie, and Murphy and Bradbury as part of Katz, a 'three-piece surf-punk band that played so fast it ceased to exist' - they formed Westside Cowboy with O'Connell.

Bradbury chose the band's name, inspired by the early industrial revolution in New York. He told NME, "the locals didn't know what trains were, and people were getting hit by them, so to control the speed of the trains, they would have guys ride slowly on horseback in front of them, and they became known as the Westside Cowboys."

I've Never Met Anyone I Thought I Could Really Love (Until I Met You), the band's debut single, was released on 7 November 2024, followed by Shells, Alright, Alright, Alright, and Drunk Surfer. Their debut EP, This Better Be Something Great was released on 8 August 2025 by Nice Swan Records and Heist or Hit.

They released their second extended play, So Much Country 'Till We Get There on 16 January 2026.

In 2026 Westside Cowboy supported Geese on the European leg of the Getting Killed Tour.

In May 2026 the band announced their debut album It Goes On and shared its first single Kick Stones (The Boys) alongside accompanying music video. The second single, Pin Up Boys, was released on 1 July with a music video directed by Jack Shep. The third single, Dobro, released 6 August as the final album single. The album released in full on 21 August with Island Records.

== Discography ==
=== Albums ===
List of albums released, with title and details
Title	Details	Peak chart positions
Title	Details	UK
It Goes On	Release date: 21 August 2026; Label: Island; Formats: LP, CD, digital download, streaming	5

=== Extended plays ===
List of extended plays, with title and details
Title	Details
This Better Be Something Great	Release date: 8 August 2025; Label: Heist or Hit, Nice Swan; Formats: LP, CD, digital download, streaming
So Much Country 'Till We Get There	Release date: 16 January 2026; Label: Island; Format: LP, CD, digital download, streaming

=== Singles ===
List of singles, showing year released
Title	Year	Album
"I've Never Met Anyone I Thought I Could Really Love (Until I Met You)"	2024	This Better Be Something Great
"Shells"	2025	This Better Be Something Great
"Alright Alright Alright"	2025	This Better Be Something Great
"Drunk Surfer"	2025	This Better Be Something Great
"Don't Throw Rocks"	2025	So Much Country 'Till We Get There
"Can't See"	2025	So Much Country 'Till We Get There
"Kick Stones (The Boys)"	2026	It Goes On
"Pin Up Boys"	2026	It Goes On
"Dobro"	2026	It Goes On
