= Wombo (band) =

American indie rock band

- Origin: Louisville, Kentucky, U.S.
- Genres: indie rock; post-punk; art rock
- Years active: 2016–present
- Labels: Sophomore Lounge, Fire Talk
- Members: Sydney Chadwick; Cameron Lowe; Joel Taylor

Wombo is an American three-piece indie rock band from Louisville, Kentucky. The band consists of members Sydney Chadwick (bass guitar, vocals), Cameron Lowe (guitar), and Joel Taylor (drums).

== History ==
Wombo was formed in 2016 by lead singer and bassist Sydney Chadwick and guitarist Cameron Lowe. Chadwick and Lowe had previously been members of a punk-pop band, The Debauchees. Once the band dissolved, Chadwick and Lowe recruited drummer Joel Taylor and made their live debut as Wombo in August 2016.

On July 7, 2017, Wombo released their first EP, Staring at Trees. In 2018, Wombo released their first full-length record, Blossomlooksdownuponus. The album was added to streaming platforms on March 6, 2020, and reissued on vinyl by Fire Talk Records in 2021.

On March 2, 2021, the group announced they signed to Fire Talk Records. Three weeks later, the trio debuted "Dreamsickle", the lead single for their second EP, Keesh Mountain, which was released on May 28, 2021.

Wombo released their sophomore LP, Fairy Rust, via Fire Talk on July 29, 2022. The album received praise from The Fader calling the lead singles "a trove of dreams and secrets," and from Paste, describing the record as, "a fairytale written on a not-so-great acid trip." The album garnered a 6.8 rating from Pitchfork, and positive reception from UPROXX, stating that Wombo, "created their own post-punk fairy tale..." and praised the band's "expertly executed art-rock sound that is complete with droning guitars, frenetic chords, and angular melodies."

On June 9, 2023, Wombo released Slab, the band's third EP. In September 2023, the band opened for Bully. In October 2023, Wombo announced they would support Cherry Glazerr on their 2024 Touch of Chaos Tour.

Wombo announced their third album, Danger in Fives, which released on August 8, 2025.

== Discography ==
=== Studio albums ===
- Blossomlooksdownuponus (2018)
- Fairy Rust (2022)
- Danger in Fives (2025)

=== EPs ===
- Staring at Trees (2017)
- Keesh Mountain (2021)
- Slab (2023)

=== Singles ===
- "Sad World" (2019)
- "Dreamsickle" (2019)
- "One of These" (2021)
- "Below the House" (2022)
- "Backflip" (2022)
- "Snakey" (2022)
- "Seven of Cups" (2022)
- "Slab" (2023)
- "Danger in Fives" (2025)
