= The Rubyz =

US musical group

- Genres: Teen pop, Christian pop
- Years active: 2006-2016
- Labels: Advocate, iShine, Bema Media
- Past members: Alexis Slifer; Olivia Huesmann; Caitlin Wright; Cammie Hall; Marissa Milele; Addy Schneider; Tanner Davis; Jessica Coffey

The Rubyz is an American Christian pop girl group.

== History ==
The Rubyz was founded in Nashville, Tennessee in October 2006 as a trio. According to vocalist Alexis Slifer, the group name derives from the Bible verse Proverbs 3:15, which reads, "Wisdom is more precious than rubies; nothing you desire can compare with her." The group originally consisted of Marissa Milele (born February 23, 1995), Alexis Slifer (born September 3, 1993), and Cammie Hall (born December 21, 1990). Although all the girls were still in school, the group's career launched quickly as iShine Records signed The Rubyz in 2007. Soon after, The Rubyz began touring with iShine artists, such as Mission Six, before becoming cast members of iShine KNECT, a tween music show on Trinity Broadcasting Network.

On April 1, 2008, The Rubyz released their debut album. The 10-track project was self-titled and contained 8 original tracks in addition to 2 covers: We Got the Beat by The Go-Go's and Umbrella by Rihanna. The cover tracks were introduced to the album by its executive producer and approved and performed by The Rubyz. The album was received with extremely mixed reviews as some reviewers rewarded the album with high ratings, while others publicly hated the album awarding it with one-star ratings. The self-titled album was the last project released on Advocate Records. Even their music video, "Thirteen", was released.

In 2009, the group's youngest member, Marissa Milele, then 14, left the group to focus on her freshman year of high school. Milele was not replaced and the group became a duo. Continuing with their music, the group's sophomore project, titled Sound Off, was released on iShine Records on October 27, 2009. Unlike their previous album, Sound Off followed the iShine album format, consisting of 5 original tracks followed by the sing-along versions of those tracks. Similar to the debut album, however, Sound Off received mixed reviews, though this album attracted slightly more positive reviews.

After Sound Off was released, Cammie Hall left the group to pursue an education in graphic design. Caitlin Wright (known as "DJ Sparkles") and Olivia Heusmann replaced Hall, but Wright soon departed, leaving Olivia Heusmann as the only replacement for Hall. The Rubyz is still featured on iShine KNECT as a duo.

On April 26, 2011, iShine Records announced the release of the third studio album by The Rubyz. According to Jesus Freak Hideout, the album was released as an "MVP format," which includes a DVD, ten new songs, ten music videos, ten song explanations, inspiring interviews, multimedia content, and an episode of iShine KNECT which features The Rubyz. The music portion of the 10-track album includes five original songs as well as five covers of popular songs in the Christian music industry.

In late 2014, the group underwent a complete lineup change following the departures of longtime members Alexis Slifer and Olivia Huesmann. The label introduced a new trio consisting of Addy Schneider, Jessica Coffey, and Tanner Davis. This final iteration of the group appeared on the fifth season of iShine KNECT and contributed tracks to the iShine Christmas compilation album in 2015. On June 17, 2016, the trio released the group's final studio project, an EP titled I'll Follow You, through iShine Records.

The Rubyz officially disbanded in late 2016 following promotional cycles for I'll Follow You. Because the group was structurally designed as a franchise targeting the "tween" demographic, the project concluded naturally as the members aged out of the target market and chose to prioritize their formal educations. The disbandment also coincided with the conclusion of their primary promotional platform, the television series iShine KNECT, which stopped airing new episodes on TBN in late 2015.

== Members ==
=== Former members ===
- Jessica Coffey - vocals
- Tanner Davis - vocals
- Addy Schneider - vocals
- Alexis Slifer – vocals
- Olivia Huesmann – vocals
- Caitlin Wright – As Sparkles in IShine knect TV Show - vocals
- Cammie Hall – vocals
- Marissa Milele – vocals

== Videography ==
Released	Title	Type	Label(s)
May 3, 2011	Reflection	Deluxe Edition perk	Bemamedia

== Discography ==
=== Studio albums ===
Released	Title	Label(s)
April 1, 2008	The Rubyz	iShine Records, Advocate
October 27, 2009	Sound Off	iShine Records
May 3, 2011	Reflection	iShine Records

== In popular media ==
The Rubyz have been featured and placed in regular rotation on Radio Disney, beginning with their debut album. Additionally, the group's debut album peaked at No. 26 on the Christian Albums chart published by Billboard.
