= Radio Free Alice =

Australian post-punk band

- Origin: Melbourne, Australia
- Genre: Post-punk
- Years active: 2020–present
- Label: Atlantic Records
- Members: Noah Learmoth; Jules Paradiso; Michael Phillips; Lochie Dowd
- Past members: Maayan Barnatan; Evan Chee; Matt Drielsma
- Website: www.rfa.band

Radio Free Alice is an Australian post-punk band from Melbourne.

== History ==
In 2023, the group released their self-titled debut EP. In 2024, the group released their second EP titled Polyester. The group released their third EP, Empty Words, in 2025. In 2026, the group released their debut full-length album titled What's In Between via Atlantic Records.

== Discography ==
=== Albums ===
List of albums, with selected chart positions
Title	Album details	Peak chart positions
Title	Album details	AUS
What's In Between	Released: 30 October 2026; Format: digital, LP; Label: Atlantic Records	

=== Extended plays ===
List of EPs, with selected details
Title	Details
Radio Free Alice	Released: 2023; Format: digital, LP; Label: Impressed Recordings
Polyester	Released: 2025; Format: digital, LP; Label: Impressed Recordings
Empty Words	Released: 2025; Format: digital, LP; Label: Impressed Recordings
