= The Still Tide =

American indie rock band active since 2013

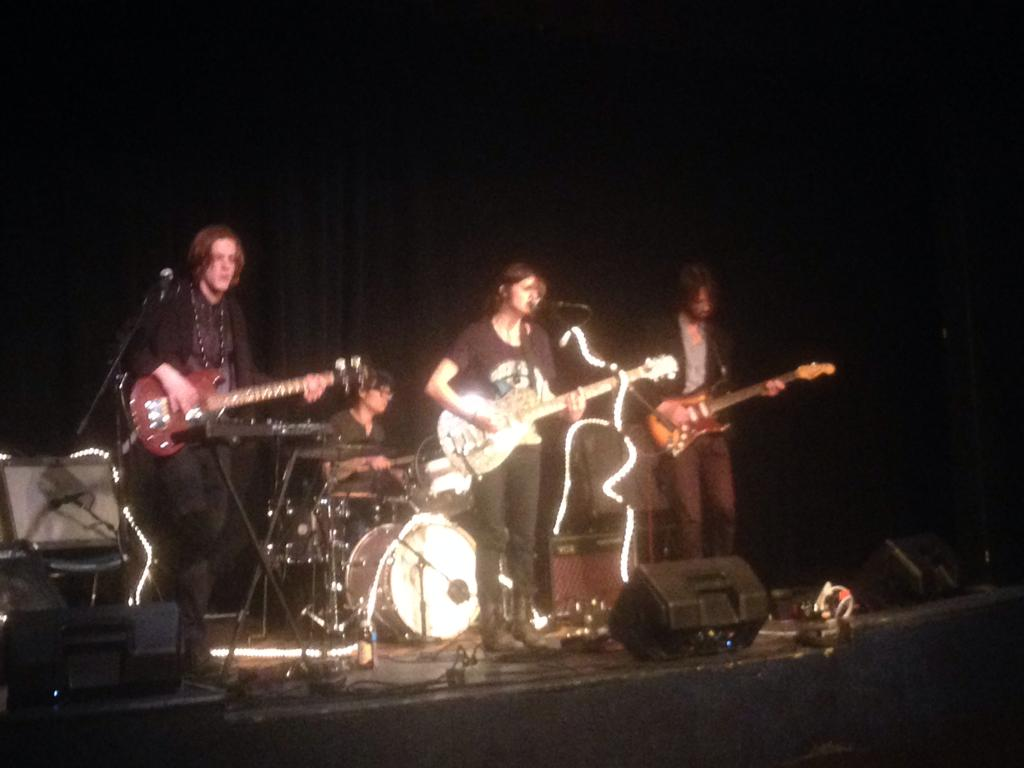

Background information
- Origin: Brooklyn, New York
- Genres: Indie rock
- Members: Anna Morsett; Jake Miller; Joe Richmond; Nate Meese
- Past members: Aaron Latos
- Website: thestilltide.com

The Still Tide are an American indie rock band from Brooklyn, New York. They are currently based in Denver, Colorado.

== History ==
The Still Tide originally was known as Yet Cut Breath before changing their name. The Still Tide used Kickstarter to record and release their first full-length album titled Tinder in June 2013. In 2015, the band released an EP titled Half Empty Rooms. In 2017, the band released another EP titled Run Out.

== Band members ==
- Anna Morsett (guitar/vocals)
- Jake Miller (guitar)
- Joe Richmond (drums)
- Nate Meese (bass)

== Discography ==
Studio albums

- Tinder (2013)

EPs

- Half Empty Rooms (2015)
- Run Out (2017)
- Each, After (2018)
- Between Skies (2020)
