= Mustard Service =

American indie rock band

- Origin: Miami, Florida, U.S.
- Genres: Indie rock; surf; jazz rock; indie pop
- Years active: 2015–present
- Members: Marco Rivero Ochoa; Leo Cattani; Adam Perez
- Website: www.themustardservice.com

Mustard Service is an indie rock band based in Miami, Florida, formed in 2015. Self-described as "zest pop", the band's music draws influences from rock, surf, jazz, funk, and bossa nova.

The band released their debut album Zest Pop in 2017. They have released five albums in total. Their latest album, Paradise, was released on August 21, 2026.

== History ==
=== 2015–17: Formation and Zest Pop ===
The band formed after lead singer Marco Rivero was kicked out of a previous band he was in with bassist Augusto Di Catarina and ex-drummer Armando Baeza. A month later, Rivero wrote the song "Taking Up Space" and shared it with Baeza; the two of them then gathered the rest of the band's members and started recording their first album. The name Mustard Service was taken from a band name generator. According to Rivero, "I did it like three times, it was between Mustard Service, Milk Inequality, and like… Johnny’s Trashcan."

Their debut album, Zest Pop, was released on June 17, 2017.

=== 2018–20: "Need", "Daddy Dookie Brown", and C'est La Vie ===
In fall 2018, Mustard Service accompanied the Madrid band Hinds on a sixteen-date U.S. tour, where they received praise for their energetic stage performances.

Mustard Service released the single "Daddy Dookie Brown" and an accompanying music video on July 26, 2019. A second single, "Need", was released in November 2019.

Their sophomore album, C'est La Vie, was released on March 23, 2020, and marked a change in style from their previous album both musically and thematically. Rivero remarked that since Zest Pop, the band had "learned a lot more musically. So this one is a little bit more sophisticated." Rivero also noted that the lyrical themes of C'est La Vie were more light-hearted and less personal: "when we wrote Zest Pop, I didn’t think that anyone would hear it, so I wrote whatever I wanted, kind of like a journal... and then I realized people started listening, so I said, I don’t want to write anything personal anymore. I wanted to write about a kid who liked to get peed on [in reference to "Daddy Dookie Brown"], so..." The writing process of C'est La Vie also differed from Zest Pop in that C'est La Vie was written by the whole band using a more collaborative approach, while Zest Pop had been written mostly by Rivero and Baeza.

=== 2021–present: Fiddle Lake, Variety Pack, Vice City Magic, and Paradise ===
On October 27, 2021, Mustard Service released their first EP, Fiddle Lake. With songs reflecting on politics, addiction, and work culture, Fiddle Lake takes on more mature themes than Mustard Service's previous albums. Since then, Mustard Service has released multiple singles, titled "Drink With a Friend", "The Dominoes", "Backburn”, and “(Your Cat) Don’t Stand a Chance”.

On August 4, 2023, the band released their third studio album, Variety Pack, which included the aforementioned singles "The Dominoes", "Backburn”, and “(Your Cat) Don’t Stand a Chance”.

On July 18, 2025, the band released their fourth studio album, Vice City Magic. The album was proceeded by four singles, titled "Big Time", "Conversation Overtime", "Going Nowhere", and "2 AM".

On August 21, 2026, the band released their fifth studio album, Paradise. The album was proceeded by four singles, entitled "Who Knew Your Body", "Aerolineas Mostaza", "Sharks", and "Psalm 2". The band announced the Paradise tour from August 22 to September 27 to promote the release of their new album.

== Style and influences ==
The band's music contains elements drawn from a variety of genres, including jazz, funk, surf, and R&B, but is most often described as indie rock or indie pop; the band calls their own genre "zest pop". Reviewers often describe their music as "beachy", and the band cites the Beach Boys as their main influence. Rivero also lists the Red Hot Chili Peppers, Mac DeMarco, and Mild High Club as some of his inspirations.

Mustard Service's members all have Latin heritage and speak some amount of Spanish, and the band frequently uses elements from Latin music, in particular, bossa nova, in their songs. The song "Pleasantries (With Your Lover)", for example, uses a Latin-style groove. The band also performs songs with lyrics in Spanish, such as "Hijo de Papá", "Alolé", "2 AM", and "Aerolineas Monstaza".

== Members ==
Current members

- Marco Rivero Ochoa - lead vocals, rhythm guitar
- Leo Cattani - electronic keyboards
- Adam Perez - drums

Touring members

- Sebastian Holmes - lead guitar
- Yucky Poor - bass guitar

Former members

- Armando Baeza - drums
- Augusto "Tuto" Di Catarina - bass guitar
- Gabriel "Nuchi" Marinuchi - lead guitar

== Discography ==
=== Albums ===
- Zest Pop (2017)
- C'est La Vie (2020)
- Variety Pack (2023)
- Vice City Magic (2025)
- Paradise (2026)

=== Extended plays ===
- Fiddle Lake (2021)

=== Singles ===
- "Oh what? A Christmas time" (2018)
- "Dead Skin" (2019, with RealLiveAnimals)
- "Daddy Dookie Brown" (2019)
- "Need" (2019)
- "Baby It's Scary" (2020)
- "Drink With A Friend" (2022)
- “The Dominoes” (2022)
- "Backburn" (2023)
- "(Your Cat) Don't Stand a Chance" (2023)
- "VCM" (2023)
- "Alolé" (2023)
- "Big Time" (2025)
- "Conversation Overtime" (2025)
- "Going Nowhere" (2025)
- "2 AM" (2025)
- "Who Knew Your Body" (2026)
- "Aerolineas Mostaza" (2026)
- "Sharks" (2026)
- "Psalm 2" (2026)

=== Covers ===
- "If You Know What's Right" - Her's (2025)
