= Sound Off (The Rubyz album) =

Studio album by The Rubyz
- Released: October 27, 2009
- Recorded: 2009
- Genre: Teen pop, Christian pop
- Length: 32:15
- Label: iShine

The Rubyz chronology
The Rubyz (2008)	Sound Off (2009)	Reflection (2011)

Sound Off is the second studio album released by the American Christian tween pop girl group, The Rubyz. Similar to other iShine artists, Sound Off features 10 tracks, 5 original and 5 sing-along. It is the first album featuring The Rubyz as a duo rather than a trio.

== Reception ==
Professional ratings
Review scores
Source	Rating
Christianity Today	4/5 stars
Jesus Freak Hideout	3.5/5 stars
New Release Tuesday	5/5 stars

With the departure of then 14-year-old Marissa Milele, the group's youngest member, in 2009, The Rubyz became a duo. With the new member lineup, the group underwent a change in style. Staff at Jesus Freak Hideout noted that Sound Off was "a lot more mature than their debut." Abandoning the sound from their debut album, the review goes on to say that the music sounds like music heard on Top 40 radio. In addition, the lyrical style has changed.

Gone are the teeny girly sleepover songs ["Time of My Life"] in favor of more socially conscious tunes.

The review at New Release Tuesday also mentions the new lyrical themes.

== Track listing ==
All tracks are written by The Rubyz.

No.	Title	Length
1.	"Ladies and Gentlemen"	3:22
2.	"Watch the Girl"	3:13
3.	"Stuck in the Grey"	3:16
4.	"The Memo"	2:46
5.	"Give You My Heart"	3:32
6.	"Ladies and Gentlemen (Sing-Along Track)"	3:23
7.	"Watch the Girl (Sing-Along Track)"	3:15
8.	"Stuck in the Grey (Sing-Along Track)"	3:16
9.	"The Memo (Sing-Along Track)"	2:47
10.	"Give You My Heart (Sing-Along Track)"	3:31
Total length:		32:15

== Personnel ==
- Alexis Slifer - vocals
- Cammie Hall - vocals
