= FreeFrom =

Financial support for domestic violence survivors

FreeFrom is an American not-for-profit organization created to help survivors of domestic violence achieve financial security. It is based in Los Angeles, California.

The goal of the organization is eradicate domestic abuse initially generating survivor wealth, while at the same time promoting a culture change where the society does not accept abusive relationships nor promotes abusive behavior, and promote fair wages.

== History ==
FreeFrom was founded in 2016 by Sonya Passi, its current CEO.

In the organization, inter-partner violence is seen as a structural economic issue with economic causes and economic consequences. In 99% of domestic violence there is financial abuse, and the number-one reason survivors stay in abusive situations is financial insecurity.

An online tool created by FreeFrom called the National Survivor Financial Security Policy Map and Scorecard shows how existing laws in each state impact survivors' ability to build financial security.

In 2024 FreeFrom was one of the 10 winners of the Elevate award of $300,000. Also in 2024, FreeFrom produced and released Survivor Made, a documentary that focus in the work made by survivors, its progress and how this allow their families to live a safe, respectful and thriving life.

== Gifted ==
Gifted is a FreeFrom social enterprise, paying their employees $28.85 an hour. The organization pays fair wages to their employees, this allows them to not lose money in rehiring and training new staff due to turnover.

== See also ==
- Violence against women
- Gender-related violence
- Intimate partner violence
- Domestic violence in the United States
