= Purple (Olivia Rodrigo song) =

Promotional single by Olivia Rodrigo

from the album You Seem Pretty Sad for a Girl So in Love
- Released: August 7, 2026
- Length: 4:00; 3:05 (Happy version)
- Label: Geffen
- Songwriters: Olivia Rodrigo; Amy Allen; Dan Nigro
- Producers: Dan Nigro; Jim-E Stack

Lyric video
- "Purple" on YouTube

"Purple" (stylized in all lowercase) is a song by American singer-songwriter Olivia Rodrigo from her third studio album, You Seem Pretty Sad for a Girl So in Love. Rodrigo and Amy Allen wrote it alongside Dan Nigro, who produced it with Jim-E Stack. The song became available as the album's seventh track on June 12, 2026, when it was released by Geffen Records. Originally written as a "sweet and saccharine" love song, it was later changed to have a more darker theme. An alternative version, "Purple (Happy Version)", was released on Bandcamp as a promotional single on August 7, 2026.

== Background ==
In March 2026, Olivia Rodrigo described the thematic direction of her third studio album in an interview with British Vogue. She stated that the album predominantly features "sad love songs", explaining that many of her favorite romantic tracks derive their appeal from an undercurrent of fear or longing. The album takes inspiration from Rodrigo's time in London. Multiple tracks on the album are said to reference the relationship of Sex and the City characters Miranda Hobbes and Steve Brady. On April 2, 2026, the album title was unveiled after being painted on a pink wall in Los Angeles and hinted with the final word in the album title in many cities. Rodrigo continued her collaboration with Dan Nigro, who returned to be the album's producer. Rodrigo released "Drop Dead" as the lead single on April 17, 2026. A second song from the album, called "Begged", was performed on Saturday Night Live on May 2, 2026.

Speaking of the album's conception and the influence of Sex and the City on the tracks, Rodrigo stated: "Like, when Miranda and Steve are getting back together, she's crying. 'Steve, anytime something funny happens, I just want to tell you.' And I remember watching that and being like, 'Oh, my God, I have to write a song about this'". "Purple" is the seventh song on its parent album. Rodrigo's previous track sevens have included "Enough for You" (2021) and "Logical" (2023). An alternative version, "Purple (Happy Version)", was released on Bandcamp for streaming and $1.50 paid download as a promotional single on August 7, 2026, with proceeds from downloads donated to the fund for Rodrigo's charitable music festival Daisy Chain Fields.

== Composition ==
"Purple" is 4 minutes long. Nigro and Jim-E Stack produced, programmed, and engineered the song. They also provided drum programming and programming and played the guitar and piano; Nigro additionally played acoustic guitar and bass; and Ryan Linvill played the flute. Mitch McCarthy mixed the song, while Randy Merrill mastered the song.

== Critical reception ==
Ranking it as the seventh-best song on You Seem Pretty Sad for a Girl in Love, Billboard's Hannah Dailey thought that it is "a hazy, hypnotizing song about the initially exciting process of two people blending their lives together. But what happens when they become too similar, and their life too monotonous? Rodrigo answers this question by comparing it to color mixing".

== Credits and personnel ==
Credits are adapted from the liner notes of You Seem Pretty Sad for a Girl So in Love.

- Dan Nigro – producer, songwriter, engineer, acoustic guitar, bass, drum programming, guitar, piano, programming, background vocals
- Jim-E Stack – producer, engineer, drum programming, guitar, piano, programming
- Olivia Rodrigo – vocals, background vocals, songwriter
- Amy Allen – background vocals, songwriter
- Ryan Linvill – flute
- Koby Berman – additional engineer
- Randy Merrill – mastering
- Mitch McCarthy – mixing

== Charts ==
Chart positions for "Purple"
| Chart (2026) | Peak position |
|---|---|
| Australia (ARIA) | 19 |
| Canada Hot 100 (Billboard) | 27 |
| Global 200 (Billboard) | 23 |
| New Zealand (Recorded Music NZ) | 26 |
| Singapore (RIAS) | 27 |
| Sweden Heatseeker (Sverigetopplistan) | 16 |
| UK Streaming (OCC) | 29 |
| US Billboard Hot 100 | 25 |
| US Hot Rock & Alternative Songs (Billboard) | 8 |

== Certifications ==
Certifications
| Region | Certification | Certified units/sales |
|---|---|---|
| Canada (Music Canada) | Gold | 40,000^{‡} |
^{‡} Sales+streaming figures based on certification alone.
