= Sexual and reproductive health policy of the second Trump administration =

U.S. reproductive health policy

Sexual and reproductive health policy of the second Trump administration concerns United States federal domestic and foreign policy affecting sexual and reproductive health and rights (SRHR) during the second presidency of Donald Trump, beginning January 20, 2025. The World Health Organization (WHO) describes SRHR as encompassing access to contraception; fertility and infertility care; maternal and perinatal health; prevention and treatment of sexually transmitted infections (STIs); protection from sexual and gender-based violence; and education on safe and healthy relationships.

Domestic actions reported during the administration's first year included changes to federal reproductive-health websites and datasets, emergency-abortion guidance under the Emergency Medical Treatment and Labor Act (EMTALA), review of mifepristone regulation, changes in enforcement priorities under the Freedom of Access to Clinic Entrances Act, family-planning funding actions, Medicaid payment restrictions affecting certain providers, federally funded sex-education directives, and policies defining sex for federal purposes.

Foreign-policy actions included a pause and review of foreign assistance, reinstatement of the Mexico City policy, controversy over stored contraceptive supplies abroad, and announced changes in U.S. participation in certain United Nations organizations. News outlets and policy analysts also linked some early second-term actions to proposals associated with Project 2025, a conservative presidential transition initiative and policy blueprint published during the 2024 election cycle, while noting that Project 2025 was presented as formally independent of the Trump campaign.

== Background ==
=== Post-Dobbs legal and policy context ===
In June 2022, the U.S. Supreme Court ruled in Dobbs v. Jackson Women's Health Organization that the U.S. Constitution does not confer a right to abortion and overruled Roe v. Wade and Planned Parenthood v. Casey, returning primary authority over abortion regulation to elected branches and the states. Reporting and policy analysis in the following years described a patchwork of state restrictions and protections and increased reliance on telehealth medication abortion in some jurisdictions.

=== Project 2025 and Mandate for Leadership ===
Project 2025 is a presidential transition initiative organized by conservative groups and described in major reporting as centered on a policy volume, Mandate for Leadership: The Conservative Promise, which outlines proposals for restructuring federal agencies and revising policies related to abortion, contraception, LGBTQ rights, and public-health programs. Media summaries of the document's proposals described recommendations affecting abortion access, including medication abortion; federal abortion reporting; contraception policy; LGBTQ-related civil-rights policies; and criminalization of pornography.

== Domestic policy ==
=== Federal information and public-health data ===
On January 20, 2025, the federal government website ReproductiveRights.gov, launched during the Biden administration, was reported to be offline shortly after the inauguration. On January 29, 2025, the Office of Personnel Management (OPM) issued initial guidance to agencies regarding Executive Order 14168, including directions to end programs that "promote or reflect gender ideology" as defined by the order.

Reuters reported that U.S. health agencies began removing online content related to transgender, gay, lesbian, and bisexual health issues in late January 2025, citing the executive order and the OPM memo; the report identified removed pages and data related to HIV, STI prevention, and population-health topics. KFF reported that multiple federal datasets and dashboards went offline on January 31, 2025, including datasets used in public-health research and reporting. In February 2025, the Associated Press reported that a federal judge ordered some agencies to restore access to certain health-related webpages and datasets removed following the executive order, in a case brought by medical and public-interest plaintiffs.

=== Abortion policy and emergency care ===
Media reporting and policy analysis described Project 2025 proposals related to abortion policy as including increased abortion reporting, changes to federal agency guidance, and restrictions targeting medication abortion access and telemedicine abortion.

==== Emergency care under EMTALA ====
Following Dobbs, litigation addressed whether EMTALA could require abortion as stabilizing treatment in emergency circumstances. In January 2024, Reuters reported that the U.S. Court of Appeals for the Fifth Circuit sided with Texas in Texas v. Becerra, holding that the federal government could not enforce Biden-era EMTALA guidance in Texas requiring emergency abortions when necessary to stabilize certain patients if that would conflict with state law. In June 2025, Governor Gavin Newsom and the California Department of Justice stated that the Trump administration rescinded Biden-era guidance interpreting EMTALA to require hospitals to provide abortion as stabilizing treatment in certain emergency circumstances; California announced litigation in response.

==== Medication abortion and telehealth ====
Reuters reported in June 2025 that Health and Human Services Secretary Robert F. Kennedy Jr. told Congress that he directed Food and Drug Administration (FDA) Commissioner Marty Makary to review mifepristone regulations, with Democratic state officials urging the FDA to remove restrictions and describing the drug as safe and effective. In December 2025, Reuters reported that the FDA delayed a safety review of mifepristone at the request of Commissioner Makary, according to a Bloomberg News report, and stated that Kennedy had confirmed the review was ongoing. Proposals to restrict nationwide distribution of abortion medication have cited the Comstock Act, an 1873 federal anti-vice statute restricting the mailing of certain "obscene" materials.

==== Clinic access and FACE Act enforcement ====
The Freedom of Access to Clinic Entrances Act of 1994 (FACE Act) criminalizes force, threats of force, and physical obstruction intended to injure, intimidate, or interfere with access to reproductive health services. In March 2025, the U.S. Department of Justice dropped three pending civil cases brought under the FACE Act, a shift Reuters described as aligned with administration priorities by Attorney General Pam Bondi. Reuters also reported in June 2025 that Representative Chip Roy introduced H.R. 589 to repeal the FACE Act, and described debate over the law's enforcement and scope.

=== Contraception and family planning ===
==== Title X funding ====
The Title X Family Planning Program is a federal grant program established in 1970 to support family planning and related preventive health services. In March 2025, The Washington Post reported that the administration began withholding nearly $66 million in federal Title X funding from Planned Parenthood affiliates and other organizations, affecting clinics in multiple states and disrupting access to contraception, STI testing, and cancer screenings; HHS stated the action involved compliance investigations related to grant terms. The Associated Press reported that the administration paused Title X grants for 16 organizations while investigating potential violations, and that providers and public-health groups warned of disproportionate impacts on lower-income patients. KFF published an accounting of affected Title X grantees and clinics in April 2025.

==== Medicaid payment restrictions ====
On July 4, 2025, Congress enacted Public Law 119–21, a budget reconciliation law described in reporting as the "One Big Beautiful Bill Act". The enrolled bill text includes Section 71113, titled "Federal payments to prohibited entities". Reuters reported in December 2025 that a federal appeals court upheld the provision against one Planned Parenthood challenge while other litigation continued, and described Planned Parenthood reporting multiple clinic closures following implementation. KFF summarized Section 71113 litigation and described arguments that the provision could reduce access to contraception and preventive care for Medicaid enrollees who obtained services from affected providers.

==== Contraceptive coverage ====
Reporting and policy analysis described continuing litigation and regulatory disputes over the Affordable Care Act's contraceptive-coverage requirements and religious or moral exemptions, including actions litigated in federal courts in 2025.

=== LGBTQ-related policies ===
==== Federal definitions of sex and passports ====
Executive Order 14168 directed federal agencies to interpret "sex" as binary and determined "at conception" for purposes of federal policy, and to take actions to remove or revise "gender ideology" language in federal programs and communications. OPM issued implementing guidance to agencies in January 2025 and published updated guidance in July 2025.

In 2025, Reuters reported litigation over passport policies affecting transgender people and described a sequence of district court injunctions and a Supreme Court order allowing implementation of the administration's passport sex-marker policy while cases continued. The U.S. Department of State's passport guidance page described implementing Executive Order 14168 by discontinuing passports with an "X" sex marker and restricting passports to "M" or "F".

==== Gender-affirming care for minors ====
On January 28, 2025, the White House published Executive Order 14187, "Protecting Children from Chemical and Surgical Mutilation," which stated a policy of not funding or supporting gender-affirming medical interventions for people under age 19 and directed agency actions to implement that policy to the extent permitted by law. KFF summarized the executive order's directives and compiled responses from providers and states as well as litigation challenging the order's implementation.

==== Sex education directives ====
In June 2025, the Department of Health and Human Services (HHS) stated that it put states and territories on notice to remove "gender ideology" content from certain federally funded sex-education materials and programs; the Associated Press reported on the directive and criticism from public-health and civil-rights advocates.

=== Gender-based violence programs ===
Gender-based violence (GBV) is defined in public and international sources as harm or threats of harm based on sex, gender, sexual orientation, or gender identity, with women and girls disproportionately affected globally. In the United States, Title IX prohibits sex discrimination in education programs receiving federal funds, and the Violence Against Women Act (VAWA) created federal programs addressing domestic violence and sexual assault and established grantmaking structures including the Department of Justice's Office on Violence Against Women. The Centers for Disease Control and Prevention (CDC) describes the Rape Prevention and Education (RPE) program as funding state and territorial health departments and sexual-assault coalitions to prevent sexual violence.

In April 2025, Reuters reported that the Justice Department canceled hundreds of grants, with affected programs including crime-victim services and hate-crime reporting. In July 2025, Time reported that domestic-violence support organizations faced severe funding instability tied to the diminishing Crime Victims Fund, which supports Victims of Crime Act (VOCA) grants, and other federal funding sources; the article described pressure on services including shelters and hotlines. In September 2025, Reuters reported that new Justice Department grant conditions restricted certain activities described as involving "gender ideology" and some diversity, equity, and inclusion (DEI) programming; the report also described litigation and an injunction blocking some grant conditions.

== Foreign and international policy ==
=== Foreign assistance pause and program review ===
On January 20, 2025, President Trump issued Executive Order 14169 directing a 90-day pause in U.S. foreign development assistance pending review for consistency with administration priorities. Reuters reported that the State Department issued a "stop-work" order on foreign assistance on January 24, 2025, with limited waivers.

KFF described the U.S. Agency for International Development (USAID) as the lead implementing agency for U.S. global family planning and reproductive-health activities and tracked status changes for those programs during reviews and restructuring. The Guttmacher Institute estimated that FY 2024 appropriations for global family planning and reproductive health, totaling $607.5 million including a United Nations Population Fund (UNFPA) line item, would, when uninterrupted, provide contraceptive services to tens of millions of women and couples and avert unintended pregnancies and maternal deaths.

=== Mexico City policy ===
On January 24, 2025, the White House issued a memorandum reinstating the Mexico City policy, sometimes called the global gag rule, and directing agencies to implement and extend its requirements across U.S. global health assistance programs. KFF's explainer describes reinstatement, scope, and prior rescissions and reimpositions across administrations.

=== Contraceptive supply controversies ===
In September 2025, Reuters and the Associated Press reported on U.S. plans related to destruction of stored contraceptives in a warehouse in Belgium, and described controversy around the policy choice and potential alternatives.

=== United Nations organizations ===
In February 2025, the White House announced U.S. withdrawal from the UN Human Rights Council and described a broader review and reduction of U.S. participation in certain UN organizations; the Associated Press reported the withdrawal and related funding decisions.

== Reported effects and analysis ==
The Office of the High Commissioner for Human Rights (OHCHR) describes sexual and reproductive health and rights as encompassing maternal health, family planning, comprehensive sexuality education, prevention and treatment of STIs and HIV, fertility and infertility options, and access to abortion care, and frames these issues within international human-rights mechanisms.

Analysts and clinicians described public-health data removals and website changes in 2025 as affecting clinical practice and access to information on HIV, STIs, and reproductive-health services, including for marginalized populations. Major news outlets and policy organizations described domestic funding changes affecting Title X and Medicaid reimbursement for certain providers as disproportionately affecting lower-income patients who rely on subsidized clinics for contraception, STI testing, and preventive screenings. Policy analysts also described the 2025 foreign-assistance pause and subsequent programmatic changes as disrupting global family-planning and reproductive-health service delivery and supply chains that had previously been implemented through USAID and partners.

== See also ==
- Project 2025
- Mexico City policy
- Title X
- Emergency Medical Treatment and Labor Act
- Abortion in the United States
