= CashorTrade =

Online ticket-reselling market

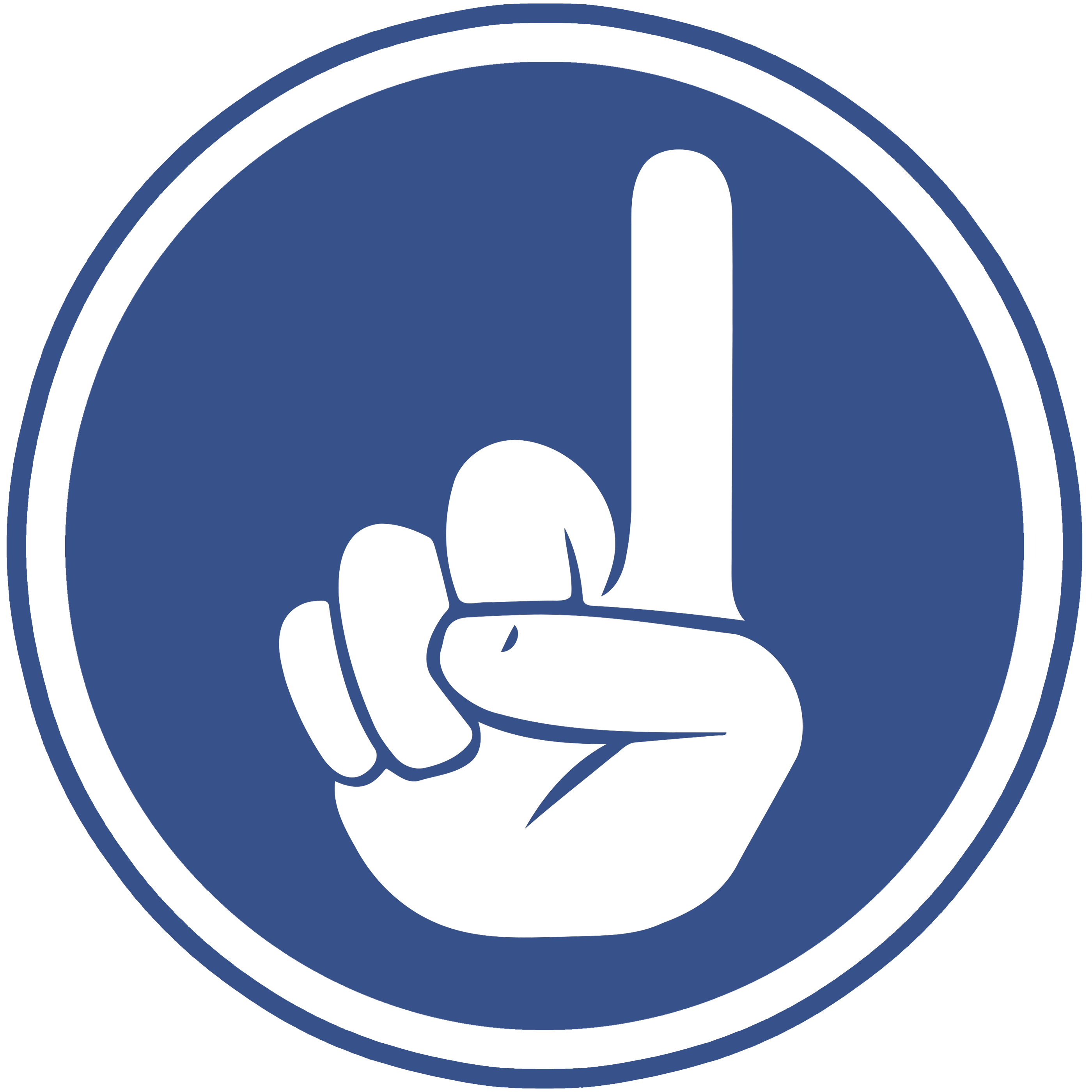

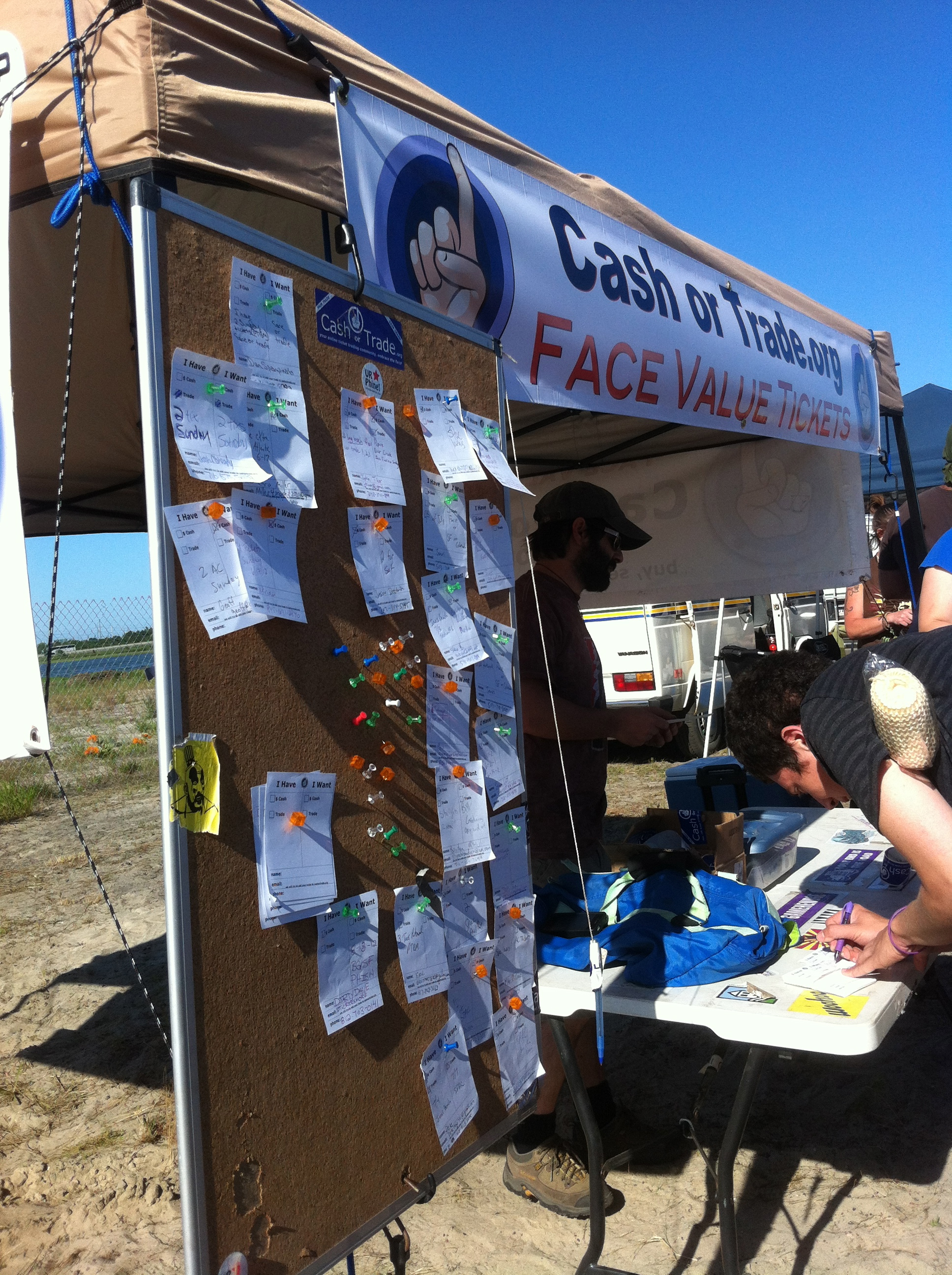

CashorTrade is a fan-to-fan face-value ticket-reselling market created in 2009 by brothers Brando and Dusty Rich based in Burlington, Vermont. As of November 2017, the platform had users from 20 countries and had processed over half a million transactions. The platform offers an optional gold membership which provides early notice of available tickets for an annual fee.

== Overview ==
CashorTrade does not allow ticket-scalping (reselling tickets above the original price). The marketplace is user-policed; tickets sold above face value are flagged and removed. CashorTrade works with many artists and non-profits dedicated to keeping resale tickets at face value, including Twiddle, Greensky Bluegrass, Billy Strings, The Osiris Podcast Network, The Waterwheel Foundation and Phish.

== History ==
The service began as a tent in the Phish parking lot outside shows in 2009. The Rich brothers began creating an online interface for the platform; the app is now available for both iPhone and Android users.

In June 2019, CashorTrade launched an escrow service, providing a money-back guarantee on all purchases.
