= Choir Boy (band) =

American synth-pop band

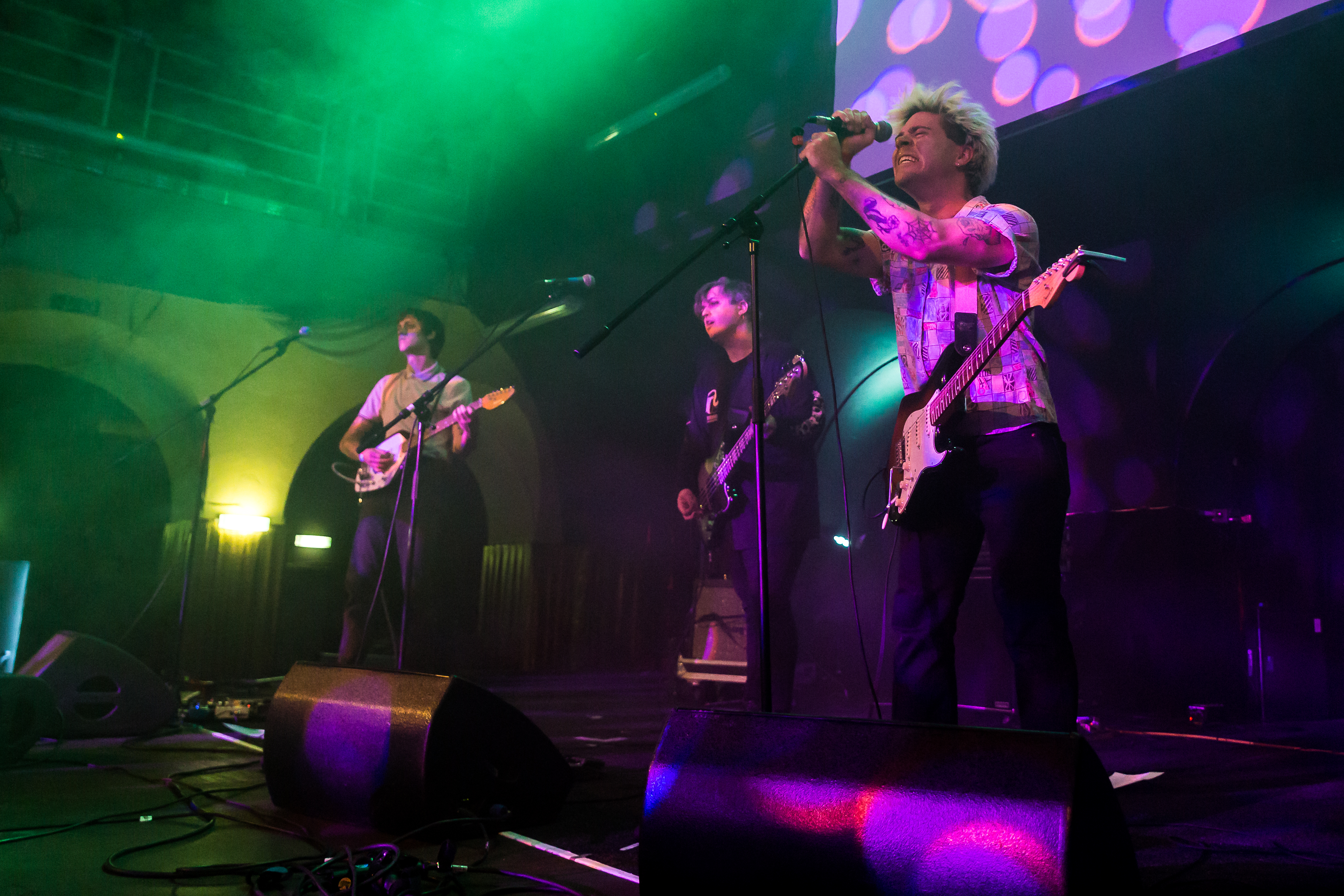
- Choir Boy performing at Wave-Gotik-Treffen in 2022

Background information
- Origin: Salt Lake City, Utah, U.S.
- Genres: Synth-pop; new romantic
- Years active: 2016–present
- Labels: Dais; Team Love
- Members: Adam Klopp; Michael Paulsen; Chaz Costello; Jeff Kleinman
- Past members: Katrina Marie Ricks Peterson; Bret Meisenbach; Jacob Hall; Kaden Hendron; Kyle Hooper; Alyssa Pyper
- Website: www.daisrecords.com/collections/choir-boy

Choir Boy is an American synth-pop band from Salt Lake City, Utah. The band consists of vocalist and multi-instrumentalist Adam Klopp, guitarist Michael Paulsen, bassist Chaz Costello and keyboardist/saxophonist Jeff Kleinman.

The band's sound is reminiscent of styles from the 1980s including synth-pop, dream pop, indie pop and post-punk. It has drawn comparisons to artists including Kate Bush, Bryan Ferry, the Cure and the Smiths.

== History ==
The name "Choir Boy" was chosen to reclaim a nickname previously used to torment lead singer Adam Klopp as a teenager when he fronted bands in his hometown of Cleveland, Ohio. Klopp was raised in a devout religious household and sang in choirs growing up, but he was subject to ridicule when he entered the DIY punk scene. Klopp moved from Cleveland to Provo, Utah to attend Brigham Young University, where he played in multiple bands including the chamber pop and indie folk band Bat Manors, which he sang in and wrote a song titled "Choir Boy". Seeking a fresh start to suit his new musical style, he started a project with the new name Choir Boy.

Choir Boy released their debut album, Passive With Desire, in 2016 on Team Love Records. They then signed to Dais Records, following up their first album with the 2018 single "Sunday Light". Their second album, Gathering Swans, was released in May 2020 to positive reviews.

In 2021, Choir Boy released their single "Rowdy Friends," a synth-pop cover of Hank Williams Jr.'s classic Country number-one hit from 1981.

In 2023, Choir Boy opened for AFI's Sing the Sorrow 20th anniversary show.

== Reception ==
New Noise Magazine praised their second album, Gathering Swans, saying that it "has elements that everyone wants in sensible pop; danceable, memorable, meaningful, powerful, music and lyrics that stay with you and don't need to beg for repeated listens." Newsweek was equally positive, saying that the "second album from Choir Boy mastermind Adam Klopp features a dramatically moving vocal performance all throughout." Paste also gave the album a good review, saying that "Choir Boy is one-of-a-kind band with a one-of-a-kind sound."

In 2024, Paste ranked Gathering Swans at No. 92 in its list of "The 100 Best Albums of the 2020s So Far".

== Band members ==
=== Permanent lineup ===
- Adam Klopp – vocals, synths, guitar, piano, percussion and sequencing
- Michael Paulsen – guitar, synths
- Chaz Costello – bass, guitar
- Jeff Kleinman – keyboard, saxophone

=== Past members ===
- Katrina Marie Ricks Peterson – bass, vocals
- Bret Meisenbach – guitar
- Jacob Hall – drums
- Kyle Hooper – keyboard
- Alyssa Pyper – strings
- Kaden Hendron – keyboard, synthesizer

== Discography ==
=== Albums ===
- Passive with Desire (Team Love, 2016)
- Gathering Swans (Dais Records, 2020)

=== Extended Plays ===
- Part Time Punks Sessions (Dais Records, 2018)

=== Singles ===
- "Saturday Light" / "Madeline" (Dais Records, 2016)
- "Dark Room (Demo)" (Dais Records, 2018)
- "Nites Like This" (Dais Records, 2019)
- "Rowdy Friends" (Dais Records, 2021)
- "Dove" (with MNDR) (WonderSound Records, 2021)
- "I'll Always Let You Down" (Dais Records, 2026)
