= Quiet Light (musician) =

- Origin: Austin, Texas
- Genres: Avant-pop, folktronica, indie folk
- Years active: 2020–present
- Label: True Panther

Riya Mahesh, better known by her stage name Quiet Light, is an American indie folk musician and producer from Austin, Texas. Mahesh is currently signed to the label True Panther.

== History ==
Mahesh released her first self-EP as Quiet Light in 2020. In 2023, Mahesh released her debut album under the Quiet Light moniker titled Blue Angel Sparkling Silver. Mahesh released her second album, Blue Angel Sparkling Silver 2 in 2026 to wider attention.

== Discography ==
Studio albums

- Blue Angel Sparkling Silver (2024)
- Blue Angel Sparkling Silver 2 (2026)

EPs

- Quiet Light (2020)
