= L.A. Works =

American nonprofit organization

L.A. Works is an American nonprofit organization founded by Richard Dreyfuss, Donna Bojarsky, and Bob Johnson.

In 2014, the Los Angeles County Board of Supervisors voted to end a contract with LA Works after audits found that it overcharged the county nearly $1 million for job training of jail inmates and unemployed residents.
