= The Backseat Lovers =

American alternative rock band

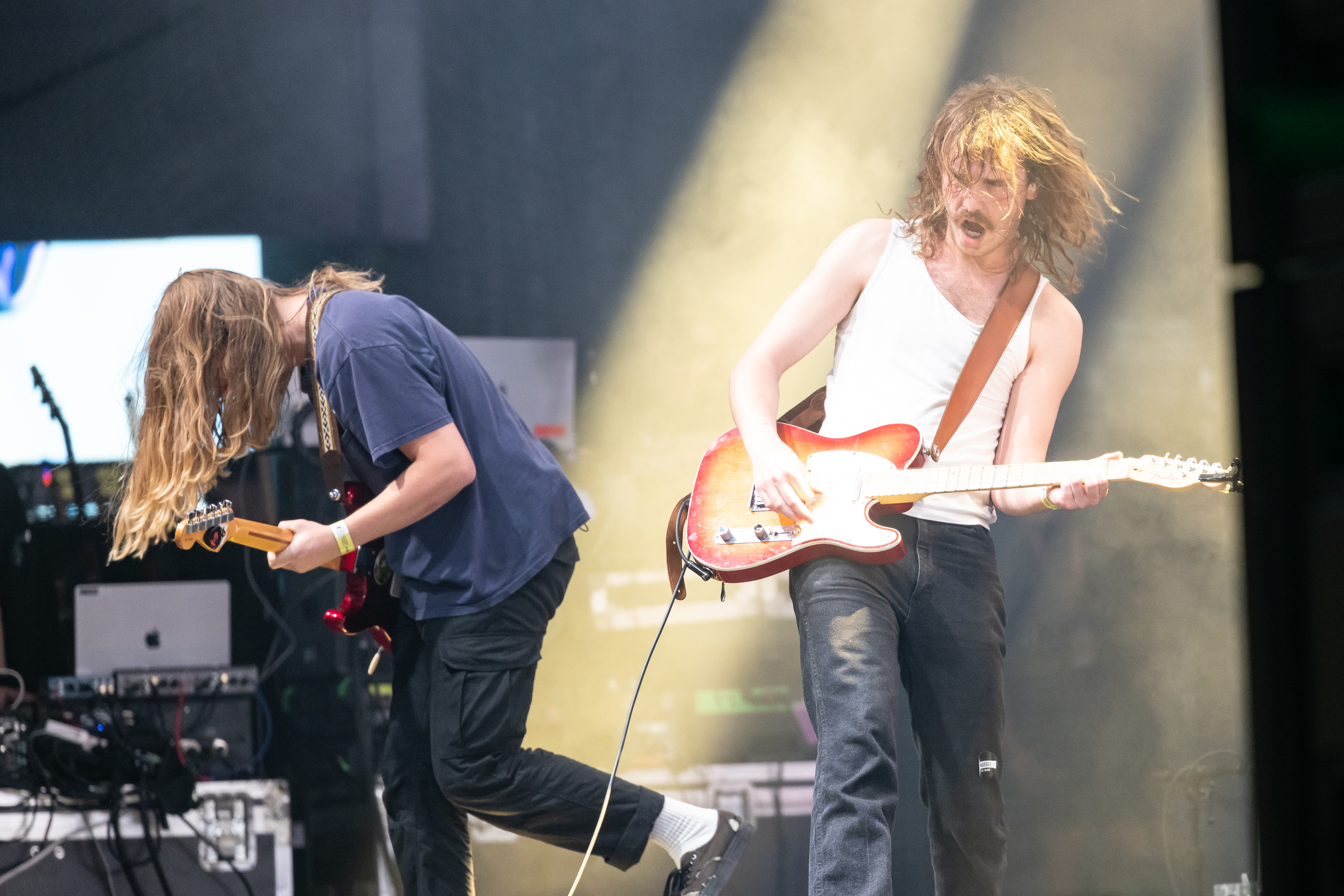
- The Backseat Lovers in 2023

Background information
- Origin: Provo, Utah
- Genres: Indie rock; alternative; folk rock
- Years active: 2018–present
- Label: Capitol Records
- Members: Joshua Harmon; Jonas Swanson; Juice Welch; KJ Ward
- Past members: Ethan Christensen
- Website: www.thebackseatlovers.com

The Backseat Lovers is an American rock band formed in Provo, Utah in 2018. The band's 2019 single "Kilby Girl" reached number 39 on the Billboard Rock & Alternative Airplay chart. The band released their major label debut album, Waiting to Spill, on October 28, 2022, via Capitol Records.

== History ==
The Backseat Lovers were formed in 2018. Lead singer and guitarist Joshua Harmon and guitarist Jonas Swanson first met while waiting in line for an open mic in Provo, Utah in 2017. The two were joined by drummer Juice Welch and bassist Ethan Christensen. Christensen was later replaced by KJ Ward. Harmon was previously the vocalist of the indie rock band Moody Pulp. In June 2018, the group won a "battle of the bands" competition at Velour, a Provo venue. That month, the band also self-released its first EP, Elevator Days.

In January 2019, The Backseat Lovers released its first studio album, When We Were Friends. The album featured the singles, "Maple Syrup" and "Kilby Girl", which can be attributed to their streaming success and growth. The latter song received radio airplay on stations like KKDO in Sacramento and the SiriusXM radio channel, Alt Nation. It peaked at number 39 on the Billboard Rock & Alternative Airplay chart in 2021. The band toured during 2019 in support of When We Were Friends.

The band also toured throughout 2021, including their first festival appearance at Lollapalooza in July of that year. In 2022, the band embarked on its North American "Turning Point" tour. Later in 2022, the group began releasing new singles, including "Growing/Dying", "Close Your Eyes", and "Slowing Down". Those songs appeared on the band's major label debut studio album, Waiting to Spill, which was released on October 28, 2022, via Capitol Records. According to frontman Josh Harmon, the album reflects the band’s personal and artistic growth, moving from the high school-driven angst of When We Were Friends to a more intimate and reflective sound that “had room for a much lower dynamic level.” The Backseat Lovers also announced their Waiting to Spill Tour in the U.K. and Ireland which took place in the spring of 2023.

In 2024, lead vocalist Joshua Harmon released a self-titled album under the name 'deeper sleeper'. In an interview with Hashtag Magazine, Harmon confirmed he had returned to work on a third The Backseat Lovers album.

== Band members ==
=== Current members ===
- Joshua Harmon – lead vocals, guitars
- Jonas Swanson – guitars, vocals
- Juice Welch – drums, percussion
- KJ Ward – bass guitar

=== Former members ===
- Ethan Christensen – bass guitar

== Discography ==
=== Studio albums ===
List of studio albums with selected details
Title	Details	Peak chart positions
Title	Details	US
When We Were Friends (US)	Released: January 27, 2019 (US); Label: Self-released; Formats: Digital download	199
Waiting to Spill	Release date: October 28, 2022 (US); Label: Capitol; Formats: Digital download	—

=== EPs ===
List of EPs with selected details
Title	Details
Elevator Days	Released: June 3, 2018 (US); Label: Self-released; Formats: Digital download

=== Singles ===
List of singles with selected details
Title	Year	Peaks		Album
Title	Year	US R&A Air	US AAA	Album
"Out of Tune"	2018	—	—	Elevator Days: EP
"Maple Syrup"	2019	—	—	When We Were Friends
"Kilby Girl"	2019	39	—	When We Were Friends
"Just a Boy"	2019	—	—	—
"Heavy"	2020	—	—	—
"Growing/Dying"	2022	—	18	Waiting to Spill
"Close Your Eyes"	2022	—	—	Waiting to Spill
"Slowing Down"	2022	—	—	Waiting to Spill
