= Geese discography =

- Geese performing in 2024
- Studio albums: 4
- Extended plays: 3
- Live albums: 2
- Singles: 15
- Music videos: 10

The American rock band Geese has a discography that consists of four studio albums, two live albums, three extended plays, fifteen singles, and ten music videos.

Geese formed in 2016 in New York City by Cameron Winter (vocals, keyboards, guitar), Dominic DiGesu (bass), Emily Green (guitar), and Max Bassin (drums). In 2018, the group self released their debut studio album, A Beautiful Memory. The album and its preceding and succeeding EPs were later removed from streaming services. After expanding the band lineup to include guitarist Foster Hudson, Geese began to record their following album. The quintet later signed to independent labels Partisan Records and Play It Again Sam to release their second studio album, Projector, in 2021. In 2023, Geese followed with 3D Country, their third album, alongside the 4D Country EP later that same year. These releases would be the last to feature Hudson as an official member. The band's fourth studio album, Getting Killed, released in 2025 to immense critical acclaim. The album also earned the band their first record chart placements, including number 96 on the Billboard 200 and number 26 in the UK Albums Chart.

== Albums ==
=== Studio albums ===
List of studio albums, with selected details and chart positions
Title	Details	Peak chart positions					Certifications
Title	Details	US	AUS	IRE	NZ	UK	Certifications
A Beautiful Memory	Released: July 13, 2018; Label: Self-released; Format: Digital download, streaming (Note: No longer available on streaming platforms)	—	—	—	—	—	
Projector	Released: October 29, 2021; Label: Partisan, Play It Again Sam; Format: LP, CD, cassette, digital download, streaming	—	—	—	—	—	
3D Country	Released: June 23, 2023; Label: Partisan, Play It Again Sam; Format: LP, CD, digital download, streaming	—	—	—	—	—	
Getting Killed	Released: September 26, 2025; Label: Partisan, Play It Again Sam; Format: LP, CD, digital download, streaming	96	20	23	20	26	BPI: Silver

=== Live releases ===
List of live releases, with selected details
Title	Details
Alive & in Person	Released: June 28, 2024; Label: Partisan, Play It Again Sam; Format: Digital download, streaming
Live at Third Man Records	Released: February 27, 2026; Label: Third Man Records, Partisan, Play It Again Sam; Format: LP

== Extended plays ==
List of extended plays, with selected details
Title	Details
EP	Released: April 21, 2018; Label: Self-released; Format: Digital download, streaming
Bottomless Pink Lagoon	Released: August 18, 2019; Label: Self-released; Format: Digital download, streaming
4D Country	Released: October 13, 2023; Label: Partisan, Play It Again Sam; Format: 12", digital download, streaming

== Singles ==
=== Streaming singles ===
List of streaming singles, showing year released and album name
Title	Year	Album
"Low Era"	2020	— (Note: Early pre-Projector mix; no longer available on streaming platforms)
"Bottle"	2020	—
"Disco"	2021	Projector
"Low Era"	2021	Projector
"Projector"	2021	Projector
"Cowboy Nudes"	2023	3D Country
"3D Country"	2023	3D Country
"Mysterious Love"	2023	3D Country
"I See Myself"	2023	3D Country
"Jesse"	2023	4D Country
"Taxes"	2025	Getting Killed
"Trinidad"	2025	Getting Killed
"100 Horses"	2025	Getting Killed

=== Retail singles ===
List of retail singles, with selected details
Title	Details
"Low Era" / "Smoke in Japan"	Released: December 3, 2021; Label: Partisan; Format: 7" single
"Au Pays du Cocaine" / "Cobra"	Released: February 13, 2026; Label: Partisan, Play It Again Sam; Format: 7" single

== Other charted songs ==
List of charted songs, with chart positions and album name
Title	Year	Peak chart positions				Album
Title	Year	NZ Hot	US AAA	US Alt	US Rock Air.	Album
"Cobra"	2025	30	22	21	25	Getting Killed

== Music videos ==
List of music videos, showing year released and director
Song	Year	Director
"Low Era"	2021	Fons Schiedon
"Imploding House"	2022	DJ Nissan Baltimore
"Cowboy Nudes"	2023	Andy Swartz & Cameron Winter
"4D Country"	2023	Andy Swartz & Cameron Winter
"Mysterious Love"	2023	Geese
"I See Myself"	2023	Andy Swartz & Cameron Winter
"St. Elmo"	2023	Andy Swartz
"Jesse"	2023	Charlotte Tampol
"Taxes"	2025	Noel Paul
"Au Pays du Cocaine"	2025	Milo Hume
