= Geese psy-op allegations =

Marketing campaign

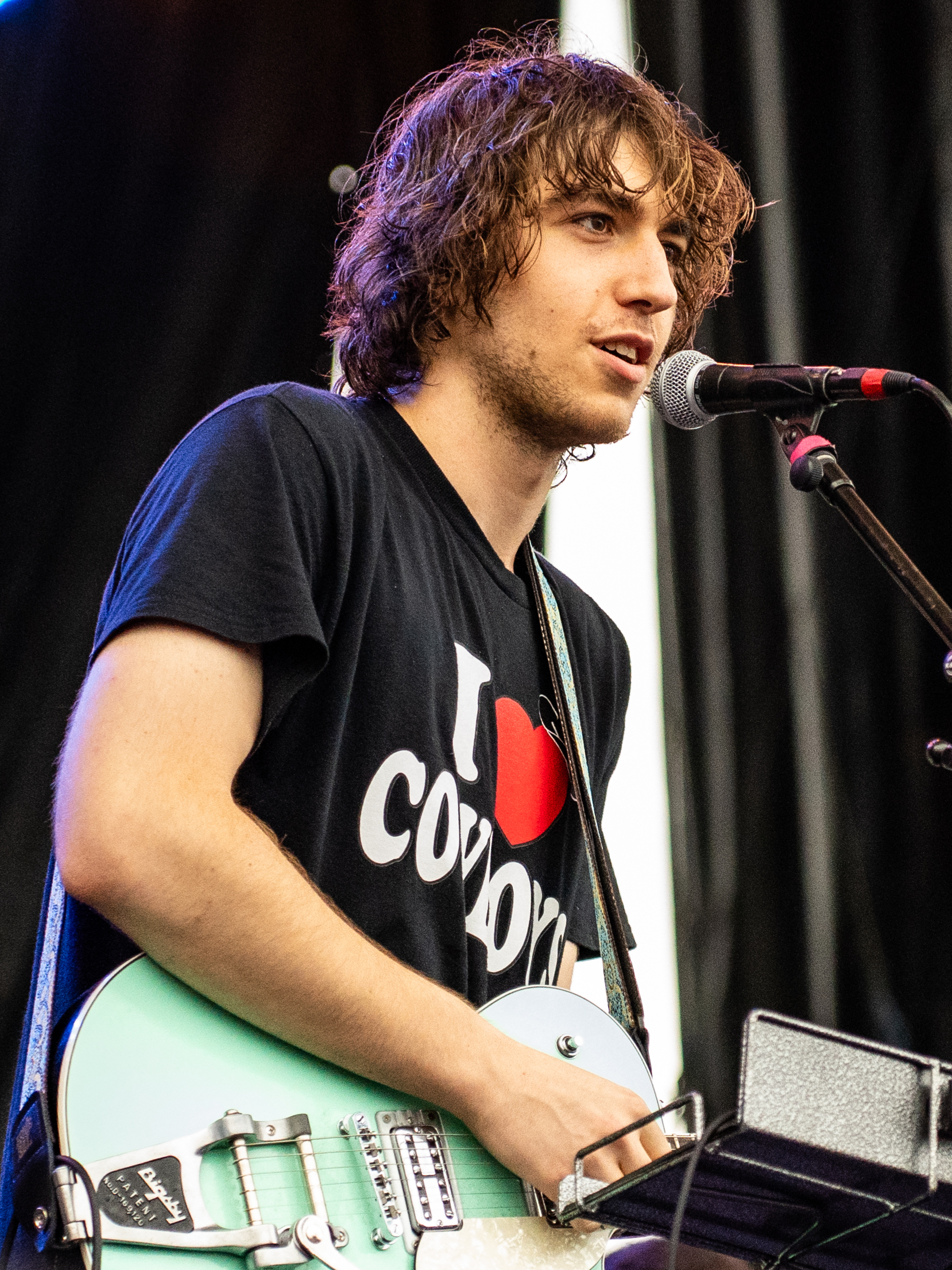
Cameron Winter and Eliza McLamb

On April 14, 2026, Wired published an article titled "The Fanfare Around the Band Geese Actually Was a Psyop", detailing the connection between the American rock band Geese and the digital marketing agency Chaotic Good Projects. Wired described the band's promotional campaign as a "psyop", meaning a psychological operation intended to deceive the public. The article's writer, John Semley, interviewed the American musician Eliza McLamb for the piece following a post on her Substack blog two weeks prior in which she named Geese and its frontman Cameron Winter among Chaotic Good's client list. After listening to an interview between Billboard and the agency's founders, Jesse Coren and Andrew Spelman, McLamb discovered Geese's album Getting Killed (2025) and Winter's song "Love Takes Miles" were part of Chaotic Good's "narrative campaigns", a form of digital PR designed to create discourse or push a story about an artist.

== Background ==
Geese was formed in New York City in 2016 by high school friends Cameron Winter, Emily Green, Dominic DiGesu, and Max Bassin. The band's label debut album (Note: Geese's first album, A Beautiful Memory, was released in 2018 and has since been removed from streaming services.) Projector was shopped around to record labels including Sub Pop and Fat Possum in spring 2020, with the band signing to Partisan Records, who released the album on October 29, 2021. Following the release of Projector, Geese toured internationally, appeared on late-night television, and released their follow-up album, 3D Country, on June 23, 2023. Winter released his debut solo album, Heavy Metal, on December 6, 2024, which was met with critical acclaim, and was followed by a profile in The New York Times and an appearance on Jimmy Kimmel Live!.

=== Chaotic Good Projects ===
Chaotic Good Projects logo

Artists associated with Chaotic Good
- Alex Warren
- Cameron Winter
- Chappell Roan
- Childish Gambino
- Coldplay
- Dijon
- Dua Lipa
- Geese
- Jane Remover
- Justin Bieber
- Laufey
- Mitski
- Mk.gee
- Oklou
- Shawn Mendes
- Sombr
- Tame Impala
- Travis Scott
- Wet Leg
- Zara Larsson

Chaotic Good Projects is a digital marketing agency founded by Jesse Coren and Andrew Spelman in February 2025. Coren and Spelman had previously founded the music management company Mutual Friends, through which they managed musicians including Quinn XCII, Chelsea Cutler, Jeremy Zucker, and Ayokay, partnering with the label Visionary Music Group in 2018. Chaotic Good was established following the addition of marketers Tim Weber and Adam Tarsia. (Note: Tarsia has also been referred to as a co-founder.) The agency offers four types of services, including "narrative campaigns", "user-generated content", "fan pages", and "brands and media".

Chaotic Good adds background songs to posts from hundreds to thousands of TikTok accounts, and engages in "trend simulation", a practice which tailors a given song to its target audience by posting on specific topic accounts. Coren stated in August 2025 that the agency's main focus was "creating a narrative for an artist on the internet and bringing them into the zeitgeist."

Billboard released an interview with Coren and Spelman on March 24, 2026, in which they detailed their viral marketing process for songs on TikTok. Spelman remarked Chaotic Good's ability to "drive impressions on anything", though acknowledged the difficulty in finding a real audience; Coren felt "a lot of the internet is manipulation", highlighting Spelman's similar belief, and emphasizing the agency's goal of controlling narrative discourse.

== Wired article ==
After listening to the Billboard interview, Eliza McLamb discovered that Chaotic Good's website listed Geese and Cameron Winter as clients. Winter's track "Love Takes Miles" was listed as a "narrative campaign", and the Geese album Getting Killed was listed as a "user-generated campaign", which surprised McLamb, as she believed such advertising was only used for commercial pop music. Likening these campaigns as being for the "Alex Warrens [and] the Sombrs of [the] world", she expressed disappointment Geese were being "propped up" by these same campaigns. McLamb posted an article on her Substack blog on March 31, titled "Fake Fans", in which she highlighted the Billboard interview and detailed Chaotic Good's client list. When McLamb's article gained traction, Chaotic Good edited the website to remove mentions of specific artists, including Geese and Winter.

On April 14, Wired writer John Semley published the article "The Fanfare Around the Band Geese Actually Was a Psyop", in which he interviewed McLamb and detailed the link between Geese, Winter, and Chaotic Good. Tarsia admitted that Chaotic Good had launched campaigns for Geese and Winter by distributing performance and interview clips on TikTok, though denied Geese's "industry plant" status, stating the agency had been fans of the band since Projector. Tarsia additionally explained the removal of Chaotic Good's client list was to avoid "false accusations or misconceptions" about how a given artist's music was discovered. McLamb later clarified on X (formerly Twitter) that she disagreed with the "psy-op" label, and shared the full quotes she provided to Wired.

=== Initial reactions ===
I am calling for a ban on the terms "psy-op," "industry plant," and while we’re at it, "Geese," at least until we can figure out what the hell is wrong with music fans.

— Wren Graves, Consequence

Initial coverage focused heavily on Geese's characterization as a "psy-op" or "industry plant", with many outlets pushing back against or rejecting such labels for the band, and amounting the campaign to simply marketing. Exclaim! journalist Megan LaPierre wrote that the story was "much bigger than Geese", singling out the band as "perhaps the ideal lightning rod for it." Paste writer Grace Robins-Somersville likewise pointed out much of the outrage was focused on Winter, rather than Chaotic Good's business practices.

Several outlets, including The New York Times and The Guardian, referred to Geese as the "saviors of rock 'n' roll" in 2026, a title mocked by Robins-Somersville following the allegations, who cited Geese as only "one of many great rock bands" in a scene in which musicians lacked the resources to stand out among the algorithm. The Guardian's Shaad D'Souza later found that Geese and Winter were additionally part of the marketing firm Byword's client list.

=== Band response ===
Geese and Partisan Records did not reply when contacted to comment about the allegations in April. During Geese's interview with Rolling Stone published on September 10, 2026, their first since the allegations began, several of the band's members provided a response. DiGesu dismissed the idea of "fake fans", and affirmed "just come to the show, and fucking tell me how many bots you see." When prompted by interviewer Simon Vozick-Levinson about the band's breakthrough being the result of a "shadowy mind-control program", Winter agreed in jest with having believed the idea, and stated the allegations became a major source of anxiety within the band, leading to Winter eventually confronting their label by email.

Winter cleared misconceptions about Chaotic Good's involvement during the interview, stating they had only been hired by Partisan Records to spread live performance clips of the band's music. Upon discovering the campaign was simply "low-effort TikTok posts" used for algorithmic amplification, Winter felt "better because they were so shitty." Bassin further rebuked the band's "industry plant" label, citing the 15 years since he, Winter, and Green began recording. Vulture had previously remarked, "with timing that did not discourage further conspiratorial thinking", Winter was spotted with Olivia Rodrigo by TMZ the day of the Wired article's publishing. Winter gently dismissed the question of what the two discussed, saying "we just talked about the Founding Fathers".

== Analysis ==
Bloomberg News writer Drew Millard remarked Getting Killed's success and the mounting interest in Winter pushed concert ticket demand "through the roof", with resold tickets reaching prices as high as $2,000, and argued the immediacy of Geese's popularity was "impossible to intentionally replicate". The Atlantic's Spencer Kornhaber attributed Geese's rise to write-ups and word of mouth, alongside "some behind-the-scenes shenanigans" to have their songs heard.

The means of promoting Geese by "flooding" TikTok with videos from the agency was connected to the broader clipping practice by Business Insider's Katie Notopoulos. Vulture's Lane Brown stated that clipping was not a "magic bullet" to become as popular as Geese by spending enough money, and emphasized the need for a real audience to sustain interest.
