= PP2 (song) =

Single by Jeanne River
- Released: November 12, 2026
- Genre: Electroacoustic
- Length: 3:54
- Label: Many Hats Distribution
- Songwriter: Jeanne Hill
- Producer: Jeanne Hill

"PP2" is a 2026 single by American musician Jeanne River. The song, distributed by American independent label Many Hats Distribution, was released on November 10, 2026. The track features Geese frontman Cameron Winter on piano.

== Background and production ==
Jeanne River, real name Jeanne Hill, is a Brooklyn based musician and audio engineer. "PP2" marks her debut as a solo recording artist. The song was mastered by Felix Davis, who had previously mastered both Winter's solo album Heavy Metal and Geese's 2026 album Getting Killed.

In order to achieve an "imperfect" sound, Hill ran the track through a vintage Ampex MM1200 reel-to-reel audio tape recorder. For her vocal performance on the song, Hill said that she was inspired by Meredith Monk and Diamanda Galás.

== Reception ==
Describing the track in a column for Paste, Grace Robins-Sommerville stated that "nothing quite fits on 'PP2', nothing lands where it you think it will", and that "River stretches every sound beyond expectation".

== Personnel ==
Credits adapted from Tidal.

==== Performance ====
- Jeanne Hill - celesta, vocals, ukulele
- Cameron Winter - piano

==== Production ====
- Jeanne hill - producer, arranger, assistant mixing engineer, engineer
- Charles Mueller - engineer
- Felix Davis - mastering engineer

==== Art ====
- Liselotte Davis - photography, cover art
