= Trinidad (song) =

Single by Geese

from the album Getting Killed
- Released: July 29, 2025
- Recorded: January 2025
- Studio: Putnam Hill (Los Angeles)
- Genre: No wave; art punk
- Length: 3:44
- Label: Partisan; Play It Again Sam
- Songwriters: Cameron Winter; Max Bassin; Dominic DiGesu; Emily Green
- Lyricist: Winter
- Producers: Geese; Kenny Beats

Geese singles chronology
"Taxes" (2025)	"Trinidad" (2025)	"100 Horses" (2025)

"Trinidad" is a song by the American rock band Geese. The song was initially released on July 29, 2025 as the second single in promotion of the band's fourth studio album, Getting Killed as the opening track. Co-produced by the band and Kenny Beats, the song was recorded in January 2025 at Kenny's studio Putnam Hill in Los Angeles, California. The song also features additional vocals from experimental rapper and producer JPEGMAFIA.

== Background and release ==
According to guitarist Emily Green, the song originated from a short idea brought forward by frontman Cameron Winter. The idea then spurred into a 25-minute jam, which "became something different at the end”, with only 5% of the jam being incorporated into "Trinidad". The track was first leaked by Winter on July 24, 2025 through Instagram Live, shortly before a concert at the Newport Folk Festival. The track quickly spread through uploads on YouTube before it was officially released as a single on July 29, 2025.

== Musical style and reception ==
"Trinidad" has been described as no wave and art punk. The track was positively received and positively noted for its abrasiveness and intensity. Described as "Radiohead on PCP", it was highlighted for its aggressive vocal performance from both Winter and JPEGMafia by Stereogum. They specifically highlighted the minimalistic creeping bass, intense drum fills, and bursts of jazz trumpets, all coming together to evoke a "funk band that's gone all-in on noise rock". Its funk-adjacent nature was also noticed by Francisco Aguirre-Ghiso, believing that the track begins as a "standard funk groove" before dissolving into chaos with the chorus.

Furthermore, Ryan Delaney of To Be Magazine received the track positively, remarking the track starts as a "bluesy, free jazz jam" before quickly escalating via Winter's vocals in the chorus. They believed the track was a perfect opener for the album, making it clear to listeners that "they are now mere passengers in an explosive-laden vehicle driven by an unhinged, disillusioned and dejected man." Brennan Weiss of Technician Online stated that the track "starts like rolling down a wide-open country road with the windows down but takes no time in delivering the tension of, well, a bomb sitting in the backseat." The LeSabre's Eli Gallagher said the track felt both "expected" and "unexpected" - expected because the opener to Geese's previous album, "2122", was similarly chaotic, but unexpected for its unique time signatures, and wonky sounding guitar and percussion.

Australian singer-songwriter Nick Cave made a statement on the band, stating that he loved the track's chorus and drums, elaborating that “the endorphins rushing wild from the freezing water, the music pounding through my body, the caffeine, the fucking ducks and the God-roiling sky — no what-ifs, no yeah-buts, no what-abouts, no caveats, at all.”

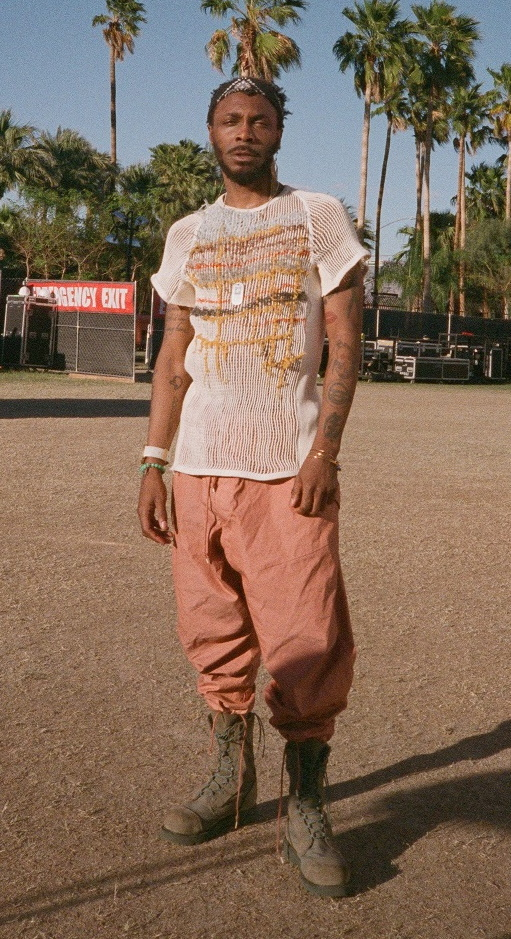
Experimental hip hop artist JPEGMafia provides additional vocals on the chorus of the track.

== Live performances ==
The band debuted the song live at Kilby Block Party in Salt Lake City, Utah on May 18, 2025. According to bassist Dominic DiGesu, the track has become a highlight for the band during live shows for its power, saying that they will often drag out the track for people who are excited to "go crazy for it". The song was performed live on Saturday Night Live on January 24, 2026. During performances, Winter frequently performs an improvised, usually somewhat comedic, monologue before the final chorus, often featuring the fictional family referenced in the song's lyrics.

== Personnel ==
Credits adapted from the album's liner notes.

Geese

- Cameron Winter – vocals, guitars, keyboards, production, mixing
- Max Bassin – drums, production
- Dominic DiGesu – bass, production
- Emily Green – guitar, production

Additional musicians

- JPEGMafia – additional vocals
- Nick Lee – trombone
- Aaron Paris – violin

Technical

- Kenny Beats – production
- Loren Humphrey – engineering
- Daniel McNeill – engineering
- Beatriz Artola – mixing
- Felix Davis – mastering
