= Live at Carnegie Hall (Cameron Winter album) =

2026 live album by Cameron Winter and film by Paul Thomas Anderson

Live album by Cameron Winter
- Released: October 9, 2026
- Recorded: December 11, 2025
- Venues: Stern Auditorium at Carnegie Hall (New York City, New York)
- Studios: Mixed at Heavy Duty Studios, Burbank, California
- Genre: Folk
- Length: 67:15
- Labels: Partisan; PIAS
- Producer: Ariel Rechtshaid

Cameron Winter chronology
Heavy Metal (2024)	Live at Carnegie Hall (2026)

Live at Carnegie Hall is the first live album by the American musician Cameron Winter. The album was recorded during Winter's December 11, 2025 concert at Carnegie Hall. The album was released on October 9, 2026 by Partisan Records.

The album includes three previously unreleased songs, "It All Fell in the River", "Emperor XIII in Shades" and "If You Turn Back Now". Nine songs on the album had previously been released on Winter's EP Singles and debut studio album Heavy Metal, both released in 2024.

== Music ==
NME described the performance as "piano-led versions" of songs from Heavy Metal, and Lindsay Zoladz of the New York Times said that "Carnegie performance's sparse piano arrangements of his wonderfully meandering folk songs will illuminate another side of his talent." Ryan Lattanzio of IndieWire said that "Winter can seem a bit uncomfortable in his own skin in the public eye [...] But on the piano, laser-beamed into his songcraft, he’s quietly electrified, at seemingly at peace as his tenorous vocal glissando and nimble fingerwork on the piano produce shiveringly tender folk ballads that echo Harry Nilsson and Van Morrison."

== Critical reception ==
Professional ratings
Aggregate scores
Source	Rating
AnyDecentMusic?	8.3/10
Metacritic	84/100
Review scores
Source	Rating
AllMusic	4/5 stars
Beats Per Minute	85/100
Clash	9/10
The Line of Best Fit	9/10
Paste	A
Pitchfork	8.9/10

According to the review aggregator Metacritic, Live at Carnegie Hall received "universal acclaim" based on a weighted average score of 84 out of 100 from 13 critic scores.

Reviewing the album for AllMusic, Timothy Monger claimed that, "It takes a certain amount of chutzpah to issue a solo show at Carnegie Hall as your second album, but Winter seems to take his success in stride on this surprising release."

Cal Cashin of The Line of Best Fit said that "Live at Carnegie Hall captures Cameron Winter’s brilliance in sharper definition than ever before. In a rapt auditorium where there are no distractions, his singularity as a performer and songwriter benefits from being placed under one bright spotlight."

Sam Rosenberg of Paste called the performance "his star-is-born moment" and said that "the marvelous stripped-down set finds Winter stirring big, epic emotions from his minimalist setup."

Walden Green of Pitchfork called it a "triumphal performance" and noted "What Live at Carnegie Hall proves is that the more Winter jettisons, the closer he gets to some platonic ideal of music. It’s the perfectionist’s dream: no mixdowns, no producers or session players to misinterpret your ideas, restricted only by the speed of your hands."

Robin Murray of Clash said that it is "so much more than a simple live album" and noted that "each song is cracked open, allowed to roam free from its studio chassis".

John Amen of Beats Per Minute wrote, "As effective as Winter may be when it comes to playing frontman – for Geese or some other ensemble – he’s equally effective, if not more so, by himself, alone under the proverbial spotlight, his songs brimming with mystery, grief, and flashes of humor".

== Track listing ==
Track listing taken from vinyl release.

Live at Carnegie Hall track listing
No.	Title	Length
1.	"It All Fell in the River"	4:30
2.	"Try as I May"	5:35
3.	"Emperor XIII in Shades"	4:18
4.	"The Rolling Stones"	4:25
5.	"Love Takes Miles"	4:13
6.	"Drinking Age"	5:10
7.	"Cancer of the Skull"	7:03
8.	"If You Turn Back Now"	5:37
9.	"Nina + Field of Cops"	6:37
10.	"$0"	8:42
11.	"Take It with You"	6:17
12.	"Vines"	4:38
Total length:		67:15

== Personnel ==
Adapted from the album's liner notes.

- Cameron Winter – vocals, piano

=== Technical ===
- Ariel Rechtshaid – production, mixing
- Kyle Parker Smith – engineering
- Richard Levengood – engineering
- Maurizio Miserere – engineering
- Heba Kadry – mastering
- Jacob Clements – assistant engineering
- Lewis Evans – photography
- Tasneem Sarkez – painting
- Anya Osipov – design

== Charts ==
Chart performance for Live at Carnegie Hall
Chart (2026)	Peak position
Australian Albums (ARIA)	8
Belgian Albums (Ultratop Flanders)	31
Danish Vinyl Albums (Hitlisten)	5
Dutch Albums (Album Top 100)	38
French Physical Albums (SNEP)	73
French Rock & Metal Albums (SNEP)	18
German Albums (Offizielle Top 100)	68
Irish Albums (IRMA)	25
Irish Independent Albums (IRMA)	5
New Zealand Albums (RMNZ)	39
Portuguese Streaming Albums (AFP)	189
Scottish Albums (Official Charts)	5
UK Albums (Official Charts)	20
UK Independent Albums (Official Charts)	4
US Billboard 200	50
US Independent Albums (Billboard)	5

== Concert film ==
Cameron Winter at Carnegie Hall
- Promotional poster
- Directed by: Paul Thomas Anderson
- Produced by: Paul Thomas Anderson; Benny Safdie; Sara Murphy; Erica Frauman; Maggie Ambrose
- Production companies: Ghoulardi Film Company; Out for the Count; Ventureland
- Distributed by: Janus Films The Criterion Collection (United States and Canada); Mubi (International)
- Release dates: October 1, 2026 (NYFF); November 20, 2026 (United States)
- Running time: 75 minutes
- Country: United States
- Language: English

Cameron Winter at Carnegie Hall is a 2026 American concert film featuring Winter's Carnegie Hall performance on December 11, 2025. It was directed by Paul Thomas Anderson and co-produced by Benny Safdie. Both Anderson and Safdie served as camera operator during production, filming the concert with a Panavision 35mm camera.

The film premiered at the New York Film Festival on October 1, 2026. An upcoming theatrical tour of the movie will take place in North America on November 20 by Janus Films and the Criterion Collection, with all screenings of the movie projected on 35mm film. Streaming service Mubi plans to release the film in the United Kingdom and Australia sometime in 2027.

=== Critical response ===
Upon its premiere, Cameron Winter at Carnegie Hall received critical acclaim. On the review aggregator website Rotten Tomatoes, the film holds a 100%, based on 10 reviews, with an average rating of 8.3/10. Metacritic, which uses a weighted average, assigned the film a score of 86 out of 100, based on 10 reviews, indicating "universal acclaim".

Writing for the Guardian, Adrian Horton rated Cameron Winter at Carnegie Hall 4 out of 5 stars, calling the film "an immediate classic" and that it immortalized "a performance that felt less like a concert than an ancient ritual and proclamation, a stake in the ground of a young but blazing career." In a positive review of the movie, Rolling Stone's David Fear says that "you get the sense watching Cameron Winter at Carnegie Hall that [Anderson is] fascinated and slightly in awe of the 23-year-old human gracefully tickling ivories and singing stream-of-consciousness doggerel with a weariness beyond his tender young age." The Hollywood Reporter deemed that Cameron Winter at Carnegie Hall was "beautifully done, though not for all tastes."
