= Taxes (song) =

Single by Geese

from the album Getting Killed
- Released: July 8, 2025
- Recorded: January 2025
- Studio: Putnam Hill (Los Angeles)
- Genre: Indie rock
- Length: 3:17
- Label: Partisan; Play It Again Sam
- Songwriters: Max Bassin; Dominic DiGesu; Emily Green; Cameron Winter
- Lyricist: Winter
- Producers: Geese; Kenny Beats

Geese singles chronology
| "Jesse" (2023) | "Taxes" (2025) | "Trinidad" (2025) |

Music video
- "Taxes" on YouTube

"Taxes" is a single by the American rock band Geese. The song was released on July 8, 2025, as the lead single from the band's fourth studio album, Getting Killed. Co-produced by the band and Kenny Beats, the song was recorded in January that year at Kenny's studio Putnam Hill in Los Angeles, California. The release was accompanied by a music video featuring the band playing the song to a ravenous, cannibalistic crowd. It was nominated for Best Alternative at the 2026 MTV Video Music Awards and Best Music Video at the 34th Camerimage International Cinematography Festival.

== Background and recording ==
Geese began performing "Taxes" live as early as August 2024, premiering the song while opening for Australian rock band King Gizzard & the Lizard Wizard on the Boston date of their world tour. In January 2025, the band partnered with producer Kenny Beats at his Putnam Hill studio in Los Angeles to produce Getting Killed, including "Taxes". The album was recorded within ten days, with the band putting in around fourteen hours every day while the city was marred by multiple wildfires dotting Southern California.

== Music video ==
The music video for "Taxes" was released alongside the song's release on July 8, and was directed by Noel Paul. It features Geese dispassionately playing the song in a venue with an accompanying crowd of concertgoers. The first half of the video is shot with a handheld camera as it moves through the audience from the back of the venue to the side of the stage, capturing the song with a built-in microphone. At the song's drop, the structure of the video changes. The rest of the video is shot on a film camera with undercranked footage, along with an abrupt cut to the studio recording of "Taxes". The audience begins to thrash around in excitement, gradually convulsing and becoming frenetic while the band observes. Eventually, the crowd starts to assault and eat each other, with one cannibal bearing a likeness to the painting Saturn Devouring His Son by Spanish romantic painter Francisco Goya. The video ends with two shots of drummer Max Bassin with a drumstick skewering through his clavicle and frontman Cameron Winter with a neutral expression. Jon Blistein writing for Rolling Stone called the music video "a kaleidoscopic burst of moshing, shredding, and seemingly unfettered euphoria that quickly descends into strange violence and cannibalistic chaos."

== Musical style and reception ==
"Taxes" is considered by Rolling Stone as one of the best Indie rock songs of 2025. The track was acclaimed by critics following its release, with many praising the lyrics written by Winter. The Line of Best Fit in a positive review of Getting Killed said that the album's "delightful mix of tender love calls, historical anachronism, and biblical imagery, all come together to turn the joyous heartland ballad "Taxes" crushingly tragic." Pitchfork rated the song the 10th best of 2025, saying it "stalks and sways on hollow, death-rattling drums and is reborn at its coda, exploding into a raucous pop melody helmed by Emily Green's sprightly guitarwork and Cameron Winter's street preacher squawk." In their list of the 50 best songs of 2025, NME placed "Taxes" at number 2, describing it as "an inspired aural collage that merges stream-of-consciousness lyrics ('Doctor! Heal yourself!') with a musical release that conjures pure euphoria." Exclaim! ranked it as the 3rd best song of 2025, describing it as "cryptic, a bit ridiculous, and the most glorious, zeitgeist-grabbing rock song in years."

At the 2026 MTV Video Music Awards, the music video was nominated for Best Alternative. It received a nomination for Best Music Video at the 34th Camerimage International Cinematography Festival.

=== Rankings ===
Year-end rankings for Taxes
| Publication | Accolade | Rank | Ref. |
|---|---|---|---|
| Consequence | The 200 Best Songs of 2025 | 70 | |
| Exclaim! | Exclaim!'s 20 Best Songs of 2025 | 3 | |
| NPR | The 25 Best Songs of 2025 | 19 | |
| Our Culture | The 50 Best Songs of 2025 | 2 | |
| Pitchfork | The 100 Best Songs of 2025 | 10 | |
| Stereogum | The 50 Best Songs Of 2025 | 2 | |

== Live performances ==
On October 1, 2025, Geese performed "Taxes" on Jimmy Kimmel Live! at the Brooklyn Academy of Music. Their appearance was during the first week of episodes following the late-night talk show's brief suspension by Disney and ABC. Writing about the show, Consequence called the performance a "faithful, glorious rendition of Getting Killed’s lead single."

== Personnel ==
Credits adapted from the album's liner notes.

=== Geese ===
- Emily Green – guitar, production
- Max Bassin – drums, percussion, production
- Dominic DiGesu – bass, production
- Cameron Winter – vocals, guitar, keyboards, production

==== Technical ====
- Kenny Beats – production
- Daniel McNeill – engineering
- Beatriz Artola – mixing
- Felix Davis – mastering
