= Chaotic Good =

Chaotic Good may refer to:

- Chaotic good, a categorization of characters in Dungeons & Dragons
- Chaotic Good, a 2020 album by Johanna Warren
- Chaotic Good Projects, a digital marketing agency
