= Au Pays du Cocaine =

2026 single by Geese

- Cover of the 7" pressing by Urban Outfitters

Single by Geese

from the album Getting Killed
- B-side: "Cobra"
- Released: 13 February 2026
- Genre: Folk
- Length: 3:30
- Label: Partisan; Play It Again Sam
- Songwriters: Max Bassin; Dominic DiGesu; Emily Green; Cameron Winter
- Lyricist: Winter
- Producers: Kenny Beats; Geese

Geese singles chronology
"100 Horses" (2025)	"Au Pays du Cocaine" / "Cobra" (2026)

"Au Pays du Cocaine" (French pronunciation: [o pei dy kɔkɛnə]; lit. 'In the Land of Cocaine') is a song by the American rock band Geese. It was initially released on September 26, 2025 by Partisan Records and Play It Again Sam as the eighth song from the band's fourth studio album, Getting Killed. The track was later released as a limited edition 7-inch single by Urban Outfitters, with B-side "Cobra" on February 13, 2026.

The song was recorded in Putnam Hill studio in Los Angeles, California during January 2025 with producer Kenny Beats. The lyrics, while vague, describes someone pleading for a loved one to stay with them while exploring newfound freedoms and changes in identity; interpretations of the song range from the slow decay of a relationship to conversing with someone's inner child. On October 8, a music video was released for "Au Pays du Cocaine" featuring frontman Cameron Winter acting overwrought while singing to a baby.

== Background ==
Then simply known as "Cocaine", the song debuted during the bands performance at Resonant Head in Oklahoma City on May 3, 2024. This initial version featured a phrase that would later inspire the song's title, taking place during the final version's repetitive exclamation of "you can change". The title of the song is a possible reference to a chapter name from the novel The Diary of a Drug Fiend by English occultist Aleister Crowley, which itself is a pun on the French translation of the phrase "the land of Cockaigne".

== Music video ==
The music video for "Au Pays du Cocaine" was directed by Milo Hume and was released on October 8, 2025. It begins with a close-up of a baby moving its arms and cooing, with a later reveal of the infant being situated on one end of a table with frontman Cameron Winter opposite of them, his face dejectedly buried in his arms. As Winter begins to sing the song to them, he straightens his posture before getting up to slowly move towards the baby. He then begins to kneel near the other end of the table, keeping an eye-level a few feet in front of the infant. Attempting to reach out and touch the baby's hand before they pull it away, he buries his hands in his face before leaving the room, resulting in the child crying and showing distress. Winter then walks up a staircase to enter a room where a large crib waits, climbing inside and assuming a fetal position. Hume said he envisioned the video for "Au Pays du Cocaine", along with the usage of a baby character, during an early listening session of Getting Killed with Winter.

[Winter] and I were listening to the unreleased album in my living room this past June. Cocaine came on, and I was struck by how serious he looked while hearing it. His lyrics have this almost lecturing, forceful tone — but who could he be addressing, if we played that idea a bit? By the second 'baby,' it suddenly became obvious.

— Milo Hume on the initial concept for the "Au Pays du Cocaine" music video, in an interview with Rage.

== Musical style and reception ==
"Au Pays du Cocaine" was described by Matt Mitchell of Paste Magazine as a folk lullaby. Concerning Winter's vocal performance, Jonah Krueger of Consequence said that the track "spotlights Winter's expressive baritone" and Kai Mitchell of Louder Than War described it as a "post-punk crooner".

In her New Yorker review, Amanda Petrusich said that the track was "a loose, heart-wrenching song that builds to a kind of transcendent climax". The song was as well called the most "subdued" and "chaotic and soulful" track on Getting Killed.

The lyrics were interpreted in different ways. Paolo Ragusa of Consequence said that this is a song about giving independence to those we love, while Eli Gallagher of The LeSabre interpreted it as a love song about someone who is scared to "lose a relationship", but also "doesn't want the partner to feel stuck". Petrusich noted that "no one can say precisely what Au Pays du Cocaine is about".

"Au Pays du Cocaine" is nominated for the Best Alternative Music Performance category at the 69th Annual Grammy Awards in 2027.

== Live performances ==
Geese performed the song during an episode of the From the Basement series made by English record producer Nigel Godrich in November 20, 2025. Later on January 24, 2026, the band performed "Au Pays du Cocaine" during an episode of Saturday Night Live where they were booked as musical guests. Writing for the New York Times, Lindsay Zoladz said that choosing the song as their introduction to SNL was an "inauspicious choice" and added that Winter's improvisational vocal runs "may have delighted fans, but the performance never quite found its footing rhythmically or melodically." The song also features the album Live at Third Man Records.

=== Covers ===
On October 20, 2025, musician Samia posted a short cover of "Au Pays du Cocaine" on her TikTok that was described by NME as "soulful".

The song was also covered by singer-songwriter King Princess in the BBC Radio 1 Live Lounge on January 27, 2026. In a post-interview, King Princess said that they interpreted "Au Pays du Cocaine" as a "lesbian anthem", adding "it's such a beautiful song. It really represents what it's like to be in love right now. A song about two people wanting freedom and wanting to be individuals, and yet are actively choosing to stay together, and that feels extremely present, but also extremely queer."

== Track listing ==
7" track listing
No.	Title	Length
1.	"Au Pays du Cocaine"	3:30
2.	"Cobra"	3:05
Total length:		6:35

== Personnel ==
Credits adapted from the album's liner notes.

=== Geese ===
- Emily Green – guitar, production
- Max Bassin – drums, percussion, production
- Dominic DiGesu – bass, production
- Cameron Winter – vocals, guitar, keyboards, production

==== Technical ====
- Kenny Beats – production
- Daniel McNeill – engineering
- Beatriz Artola – mixing
- Felix Davis – mastering
