= Singles (EP) =

EP by Cameron Winter
- Released: October 22, 2024
- Length: 7:07
- Labels: Partisan; Play It Again Sam
- Producer: Cameron Winter

Cameron Winter chronology
Singles (2024)	Heavy Metal (2024)

Singles is the debut solo EP by the American musician and Geese frontman Cameron Winter. It was released through Partisan Records and Play It Again Sam on October 22, 2024.

== Background and reception ==
Singles consists of two tracks: "Vines" and "Take It With You", both written and produced by Winter himself. Both tracks were described by Danielle Chelosky of Stereogum as "mournful" with "sprawling, poignant lyricism", as well as being indebted to Leonard Cohen.

"Vines", a piano ballad, was written when Winter was only sixteen years old. It was described by Tyler Damara Kelly of The Line of Best Fit as a "Nilsson-esque confessional". Anagricel Duran of NME highlighted how the song "sees Winter tackle early-20’s self-reckoning". In an interview with The Line of Best Fit, Winter claimed that the song was "what got [him] the record deal". He also claimed that his label, Partisan Records, wanted to replace the song "Try as I May" on his debut album Heavy Metal with "Vines", but he refused.

"Take It With You", a stripped-back acoustic song, was described by Anagricel Duran of NME as "painting a devastating picture". Danielle Chelosky of Stereogum found the song to be "moving", and highlighted its lyricism.

== Track listing ==
All tracks are written by Cameron Winter.

Singles track listing
No.	Title	Length
1.	"Vines"	3:06
2.	"Take It With You"	4:01
Total length:		7:07
