= 100 Horses =

Single by Geese

from the album Getting Killed
- Released: August 26, 2025
- Studio: Putnam Hill (Los Angeles)
- Label: Partisan; Play It Again Sam
- Songwriter: Cameron Winter
- Producers: Kenny Beats; Geese

Geese singles chronology
"Trinidad" (2025)	"100 Horses" (2025)	"Au Pays du Cocaine" / "Cobra" (2026)

“100 Horses“ is a single by the American rock band Geese. It was released as a preview of their album Getting Killed on August 26, 2025, following the release of the lead single "Taxes" and a preview of "Trinidad".

== Themes ==
The song addresses "themes of unrest, displacement, and reluctant sacrifice", including repeated references to "times of war". Other lyrics include, "All people must die scared or else just die nervous".

== Reception ==
A review of Getting Killed in Stereophile singled out "100 Horses" as "the standout track", calling it "forceful, unsettling, and gripping".

Entertainment Weekly said that the hooks were "excellent" on both "100 Horses" and "Taxes", describing them as "rollicking singles". The Wall Street Journal called out the song's "culicues of bluesy guitar".

The Globe and Mail selected it as one of its 10 best songs for 2025, describing "100 Horses" as a work that "lyrically implores dancing while stylistically inhibiting it".

== Personnel ==
Credits adapted from the album's liner notes.

Geese:

- Cameron Winter - Vocals, Guitar, Keyboards
- Emily Green - Guitar
- Dominic DiGesu – bass guitar
- Max Bassin – drums

Additional Musicians:

- Nick Lee – trombone

Technical:

- Kenny Beats – production
- Geese - production
- Daniel McNeill – engineering
- Beatriz Artola – mixing
- Felix Davis – mastering
