= Going Through It =

2024 studio album by Eliza McLamb

Studio album by Eliza McLamb
- Released: January 19, 2024
- Studio: Bear Creek
- Length: 44:55
- Label: Royal Mountain
- Producer: Sarah Tudzin

Professional ratings
Review scores
Source	Rating
Exclaim!	8/10
KXSU	4.5/5
Paste	7.9/10
PopMatters	8/10
Under the Radar	8/10 stars

Going Through It is the 2024 debut studio album from American indie rock musician Eliza McLamb.

== Track listing ==
All tracks are written by Eliza McLamb.

Going Through It track listing
No.	Title	Length
1.	"Before"	4:11
2.	"Glitter"	3:06
3.	"Mythologize Me"	2:53
4.	"Punch Drunk"	3:16
5.	"Crybaby"	4:40
6.	"16"	3:24
7.	"Just Like Mine"	4:18
8.	"Bird"	2:34
9.	"Anything You Want"	3:33
10.	"Modern Woman"	4:09
11.	"Strike"	4:20
12.	"To Wake Up"	4:31
Total length:		44:55
