= Brooklyn Friends School =

Private school in Brooklyn, New York

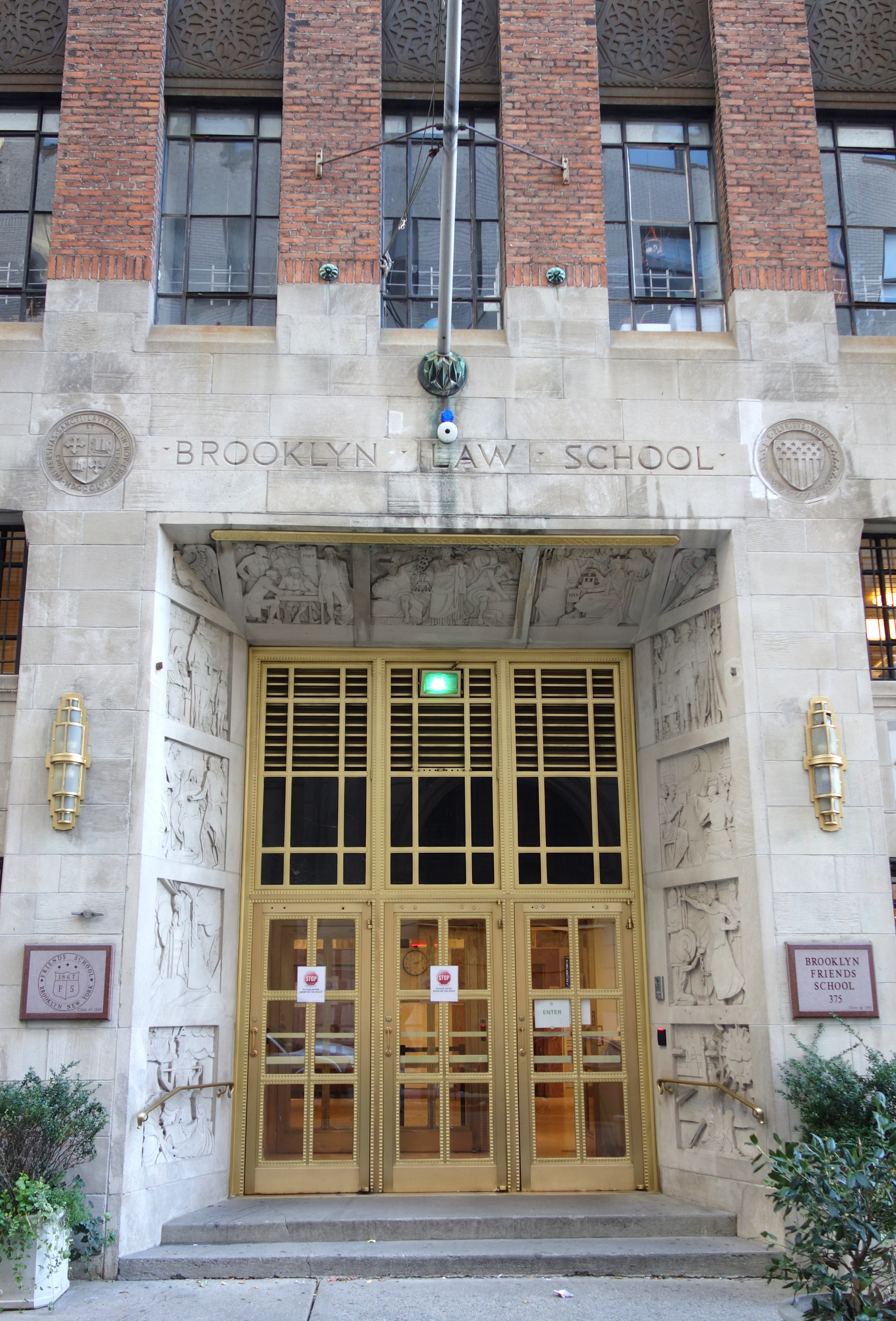

Location
- Brooklyn, New York 11201; United States; 40.6926°N 73.9881°W

Information
- School type: Private
- Denomination: Religious Society of Friends (Quaker)
- Established: 1867
- Founder: Religious Society of Friends (Quakers)
- Status: Open
- Teaching staff: 127.8 (on an FTE basis) (excluding PK)
- Grades: Pre-kindergarten — grade 12
- Gender: Coeducational
- Age range: 2 - 19
- Enrollment: 762 (excluding 153 PK) (2017–18)
- Average class size: 21 students
- Student to teacher ratio: 6.0
- Campus type: Urban
- Colors: Blue and gray
- Mascot: Pearl the Panther
- Publication: Scribe, Wordflirt
- Tuition: $31,630–$65,575
- Affiliation: Religious Society of Friends (Quaker)
- Website: brooklynfriends.org

Brooklyn Friends School is a private college preparatory school in Downtown Brooklyn, New York City. Founded by the Religious Society of Friends in 1867, the school enrolls approximately 725 students between the ages of 2 and 18.

== History and governance ==
Founded in 1867 by the Religious Society of Friends as a coeducational Quaker school, Brooklyn Friends School is one of the oldest continuously operating independent schools in New York City.

Starting as a grade school, BFS added a kindergarten in 1902, a high school division in 1907, and a Preschool and Family Center in 1985 and 1992 respectively. The most recent addition, the BFS Preschool, has gained prominence as one of the city's premier early learning centers.

The Academy Award-winning 1981 documentary Close Harmony chronicled how a children's choir of 4th- and 5th-graders from the school joined with elderly retirees from a Brooklyn Jewish seniors' center to give a joint concert.

In 2000, the school's Head, who had been in the position for ten years, resigned at the request of the board of trustees over allegations of financial mismanagement; audits revealed a deficit of $900,000 for 2000 and $375,000 for 1999. The outgoing Head of School denied any impropriety, and some parents defended his leadership.

The school had about 400 students in 1995 and about 107 teachers in 2000.

The school was founded by the Quakers' Religious Society of Friends. The school and the Quaker meeting ended their affiliation in 2010. Few of the school's modern-day students are Quaker, although the school culture and curriculum incorporate Quaker ideals. The school's charter specifies that half of the board of trustees must be Quaker and one of the two chairs of the board must be appointed by the Quakers.

In 2019, Crissy Cáceres accepted the opportunity to become Head of School, having previously been Assistant Head of School at Georgetown Day School.

=== Heads of School ===
Heads of Brooklyn Friends School	Tenure
Mary Haviland	1867-1874
Clara Lockwood	1874-1884
Susan Peckham	1884-1902
S. Elizabeth Stover	1902-1907
Edward B. Rawson (Co-Head); Nancy J. Adams (Co-Head)	1907-1913
John L. Carver	1913-1917
Guy W. Chipman	1918-1931
Wayne Douglas	1931–1934
S. Archibald Smith	1934–1937
Douglas Grafflin	1937-1942
Warren B. Cochran	1942-1953
William J. Meeneghan	1953–1968
Arthur Gregor	1968-1969
Stuart P. Smith	1968-1978
Francena Palmer	1978-1979
Kay M. Erdstene	1978-1986
Ralph E. Gillette	1986-1990
James P. Handlin	1990-2000
Michael Nill	2001-2010
Lawrence Weiss	2010-2019
Crissy Cáceres	2019-present

== Academics ==
Brooklyn Friends School is split into four academic levels: Early Childhood (2s/3s/4s), Lower School (K-4), Middle School (5-8), and Upper School (9-12). Brooklyn Friends' educational approach emphasizes "social impact, diversity, inclusion, and student well-being."

=== Athletics and Arts ===
Brooklyn Friends School offers both Performing and Visual Art curriculums. Performing arts include courses in dance, drama, music, and technical theater. The visual arts program includes drawing and painting, sculpture, ceramics, woodworking, photography, video, and art history.

Their athletics programs include Basketball, Golf, Tennis, Baseball, Softball, Track, Cross Country, Swim, and Volleyball.

Early Childhood (2s/3s/4s) and Lower School (K-4)
As of 2025, the school combined its Early Childhood and Lower School Learning Communities. In Early Childhood, "children build independence, explore, and discover through play-based learning." The Lower School curriculum includes classes in language arts, mathematics, social studies, science, Spanish, dance, music, visual arts, woodworking, physical education, and health.

Middle School (5-8)
The middle school curriculum includes classes in the humanities (English and history), mathematics, science, languages, visual arts, performing arts, physical education, health/life skills, organization and study skills and information technology.

Upper School (9-12)
The Brooklyn Friends Upper School curriculum includes the arts, humanities, sciences, and ethics.

Brooklyn Friends School offers the International Baccalaureate Diploma Programme for students in the 11th and 12th grades.

== Faculty and staff union ==
In spring 2019, more than 80% of faculty and staff members at the school voted to unionize. The school did not object at the time. In late 2019, collective bargaining over contracts began, and union representatives participated in negotiations over the layoffs of about 30 teachers due to the COVID-19 pandemic in New York City.

In August 2020, however, the school's leadership moved to dissolve the staff members' union. The school's move to decertify the union prompted opposition from parents, who believed the school was betraying its values by engaging in union-busting; over 1,000 parents and alumni signed a petition calling on the school to halt efforts to decertify the union, and about 130 teachers and staff members signed a petition of their own.

== Notable alumni ==
- Matthew Gentile, director/screenwriter
- Emily Green, Geese guitarist
- Dan Hedaya, actor
- Therese (Tay) Hohoff, literary editor
- Robert Levin, pianist, musicologist, pedagogue
- Patrick "Wiki" Morales, hip-hop artist and producer
- Stacey Plaskett, US House of Representatives Delegate for the US Virgin Islands
- Francine Prose, writer and critic
- Fisher Stevens, actor, director, producer and writer
- Susanne Suba (1913-2012), Hungarian-born watercolorist and illustrator
- Cameron Winter, Geese frontman and solo artist
- Adam Yauch (1964-2012), hip-hop artist and member of The Beastie Boys

== See also ==
- Education in New York City
