= Eliza McLamb =

American indie rock musician

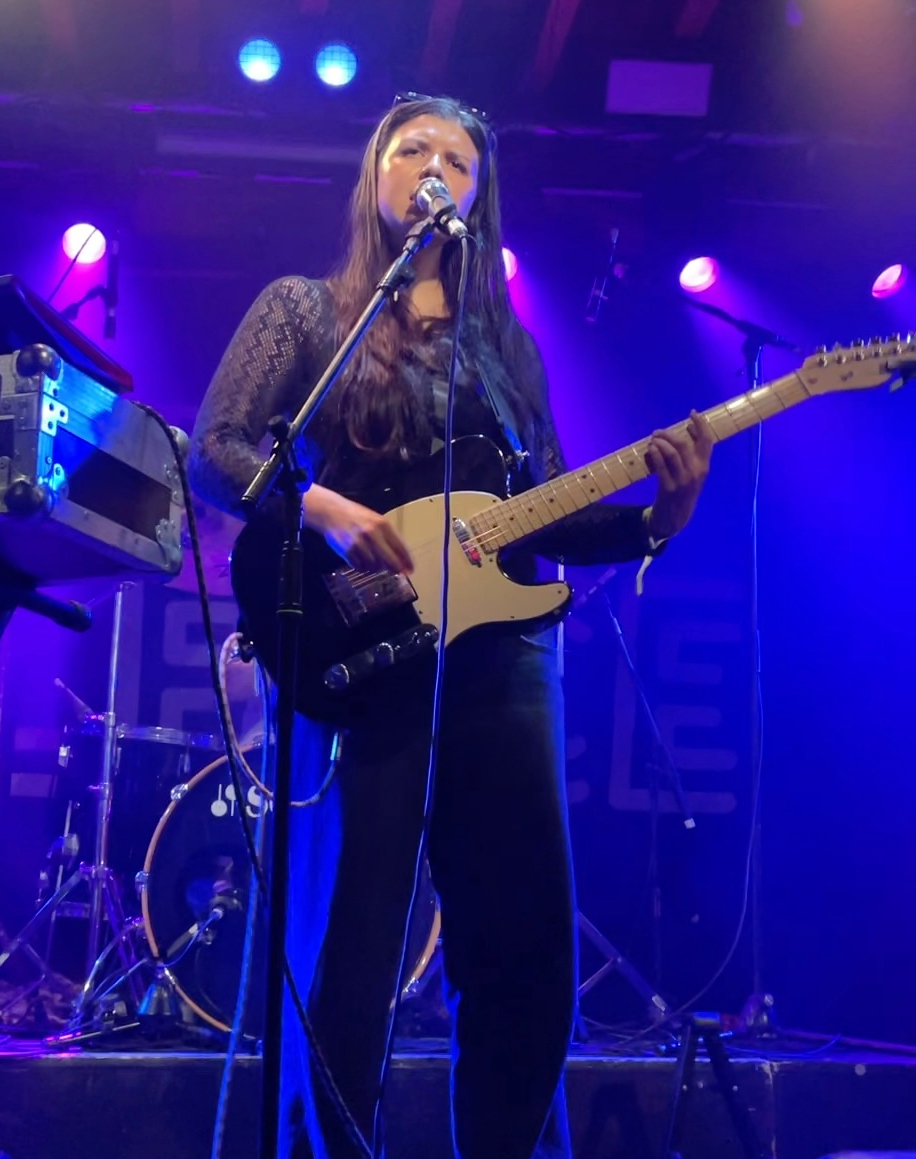
- McLamb performing in Bristol at the Dot to Dot Festival in 2026

Background information
- Born: January 17, 2001 (age 25)
- Origin: Chapel Hill, North Carolina
- Genres: Indie rock; singer-songwriter
- Years active: 2020–present
- Label: Royal Mountain

Eliza McLamb (born January 17, 2001) is an American indie rock musician from Chapel Hill, North Carolina.

== Early life and education ==
Eliza McLamb was born on January 17, 2001, and grew up an only child in Chapel Hill, North Carolina. Her mother was a photographer. McLamb graduated high school a year early as the valedictorian and went to George Washington University to study political science, planning to go on to law school. In 2020, during her second year, she had to move back in with her father in North Carolina due to the COVID-19 pandemic.

The same year, McLamb was "inspired" by the newly released album Fetch the Bolt Cutters by Fiona Apple, and left her father's house to work on farms, through WWOOF, across the country during the summer. She lived in a friend's shed for a few months in Los Angeles while working as a door-to-door solar panel salesperson, and then nannied to make enough money to move in with another friend, Julia Hava.

In 2024, McLamb left Los Angeles and moved into an apartment with her boyfriend in New York, stating she "felt stranded out there"—a feeling she explored in her 2024 single, "God Take Me Out of LA".

== Career ==
McLamb first gained recognition when her song "Porn Star Tits" went viral on TikTok while McLamb was working on a farm in Kansas. In 2022, McLamb released her second EP titled Salt Circle. Also in 2022, McLamb announced that she had signed to Canadian record label Royal Mountain Records. In late 2023, she announced plans to release her debut full-length album, Going Through It. McLamb released the song "16" as a single from the album. The album was released on January 19, 2024.

Going Through It has received positive reception from critics. Grace Robins-Somerville of Paste magazine said that the album "shows a characteristically thoughtful embrace of life’s subtleties and contradictions." Graeme Thomson of the Spectator described the album as "relentless guts-spilling" that "isn’t necessarily any more creatively worthy or valuable than simply making stuff up" before referring to McLamb as "an artist of many parts, not all of them yet fully formed." However, Thomson noted that there is "actually lots to like about Going Through It."

McLamb released her second album, Good Story, on October 24, 2025 via Royal Mountain.

In addition to making music, McLamb co-hosted the podcast Binchtopia alongside Julia Hava from 2020 to 2025, before leaving as a permanent host in order to focus on her music career.

McLamb also writes a Substack blog called words from eliza, which made waves when she published an essay titled "Fake Fans" about the guerrilla marketing tactics of a company called Chaotic Good Projects. The company was extensively covered in the media shortly after as discourse broke out regarding their strategies.

== Discography ==
=== Studio albums ===
Title	Details
Going Through It	Released: January 19, 2024; Label: Royal Mountain; Format: CD, digital download, LP, streaming
Good Story	Released: October 24, 2025; Label: Royal Mountain; Format: CD, digital download, LP, streaming

=== Extended plays ===
Title	Details
Memos	Released: December 29, 2020; Label: Lena Grove; Format: Digital download, streaming
Salt Circle	Released: December 2, 2022; Label: Royal Mountain; Format: CD, digital download, streaming

=== Singles ===
Title	Year	Album
"Ghosts"	2020	Non-album single
"Debt"	2020	Memos
"Irish Exit"	2021	Non-album single
"Doing Fine"	2022	Salt Circle
"Pulp"	2022	Salt Circle
"Mythologize Me"	2023	Going Through It
"Glitter"	2023	Going Through It
"Anything You Want"	2023	Going Through It
"16"	2023	Going Through It
"Modern Woman"	2024	Going Through It
"God Take Me Out of LA"	2024	Non-album singles
"Lena Grove" (full band)	2024	Non-album singles
"Quitting"	2025	Non-album singles
"Like the Boys"	2025	Good Story
"Every Year"	2025	Good Story
"Suffering"	2025	Good Story
"Forever, Like That"	2025	Good Story
