= Love Takes Miles =

Song by Cameron Winter

from the album Heavy Metal
- Released: December 6, 2024
- Recorded: 2024
- Studio: Diamond Mine, Long Island City; NY
- Genre: Alt-country
- Length: 3:18
- Label: Partisan; Play It Again Sam
- Songwriter: Cameron Winter
- Producers: Cameron Winter; Loren Humphrey

Music video
- "Love Takes Miles (Ver. 1)" on YouTube; "Love Takes Miles (Ver. 2)" on YouTube

"Love Takes Miles" is a song by American musician Cameron Winter. It was released on December 6, 2024, through Partisan Records and Play It Again Sam as the third track from his debut solo studio album, Heavy Metal. The song was written and produced by Winter, with additional production by Loren Humphrey. It was named the best song of 2025 by Pitchfork.

== Background and composition ==
"Love Takes Miles" was recorded during the sessions for Heavy Metal, which Winter produced alongside Loren Humphrey at Magic Mountain in Tuxedo, New York, Diamond Mine in Long Island City, and Winter's childhood bedroom. The track features Winter on vocals, piano, guitar, bass guitar, and drum machine, with additional strings by Jesse Kontansky. The song has been described as an alt-country song, with "slight soft-pop motifs and gentle piano riff".

Lyrically, the song explores themes of love as a long-distance, time-consuming endeavor. Winter sings, "Love takes miles / Love takes years / You better start a-walking baby."

== Music videos ==
Two music videos have been released for "Love Takes Miles". The first one was released alongside Heavy Metal on December 6, 2024 and directed by Andy Swartz. It features Winter singing the song live with a microphone in front of the Lena Horne Bandshell in Prospect Park. The second music video was directed by Celia Rowlson-Hall and was released on December 11, 2025. It starts in media res with diagetic audio of Lucas Hedges, who plays a "lovelorn construction worker", singing lyrics from the song. The next scene reveals that the worker was listening to "Love Takes Miles" throughout his shift as a flagger and is too distracted by the song to manage traffic. He then storms away from his job, sliding on a car hood as he does so, and makes his way to an unused construction site where he dances and rolls down stockpiles of rock. The video ends with the initial shot of the worker at sunset, who puts his uniform back on to get a drink at a convenience store.

== Critical reception ==
Pitchfork named "Love Takes Miles" the best song of 2025, with the publication praising its emotional depth and Winter's vocal performance. Radio Milwaukee music director Erin Wolf described the track as taking Winter's "wild rambling musical ways as the frontman of rock band Geese and whittles them down to an intimate, distilled version that feels more beautiful than anything Geese could ever create."

== Live performances ==
Winter performed "Love Takes Miles" on Later... with Jools Holland on May 25, 2025. Writing for Our Culture Mag about the performance, Konstantinos Pappis called the performance "striking". A performance of Love Takes Miles was featured on Winter's 2026 live album Live at Carnegie Hall.

=== Covers ===
Jeff Tweedy of Wilco covered the song in February 2026 for his Substack, Starship Casual, writing: "It seems very true to me about how love kind of actually works. I think you can feel the immediate feeling of love over and over and over again. But the real love takes a lot of miles, a lot of time."

== Personnel ==
Credits are adapted from the Heavy Metal liner notes.

- Cameron Winter – vocals, keyboards, guitar, bass
- Jesse Kontansky – strings
- Loren Humphrey – drums, hand claps

Technical

- Cameron Winter – mixing engineer, producer, recording engineer
- Loren Humphrey – producer, recording engineer, mixing engineer
- Lucas Carpenter – recording engineer
