= Heavy Metal (album) =

Studio album by Cameron Winter
- Released: December 6, 2024
- Studios: Magic Mountain, Tuxedo; NY; Diamond Mine, Long Island City; NY; Winter's childhood bedroom; NY
- Genres: Folk; soul; neo-classical
- Length: 43:50
- Labels: Partisan; PlAS
- Producers: Cameron Winter; Loren Humphrey

Cameron Winter chronology
Singles (2024)	Heavy Metal (2024)	Live at Carnegie Hall (2026)

Singles from Heavy Metal
- 1. "$0" Released: November 13, 2024

Heavy Metal is the debut solo album by American musician Cameron Winter, best known as the frontman for indie rock band Geese. Recorded and produced by both Winter and musician Loren Humphrey, it was released through Partisan Records and Play It Again Sam on December 6, 2024. The album was met with critical acclaim, placing on year-end album lists of publications such as Pitchfork and Rolling Stone.

== Background and recording ==
Winter said that he had privately written solo material for years alongside his involvement with Geese, but that the initial spark for him to write a solo album came out of a strong impulse to write music independent of the band. He believed that the songs on Heavy Metal would be weak with a full band arrangement, and had concerns about the album being perceived as "diet Geese." For Heavy Metal, Winter employed engineer Loren Humphrey for instrumentation and production. Humphrey previously worked as an engineer for Geese's 2023 album 3D Country, being invited by Winter to work on his solo album due to him being the only engineer Winter knew personally. Recording started in July of 2023 in Humphrey’s studio in Tuxedo, New York, located in the guest house of a larger estate. Winter initially expected the album to take four months to complete and release, but personal setbacks and multiple revisions had resulted in the album becoming a year-long endeavor. During the recording of Heavy Metal, Winter fell into a depressive episode, which exacerbated the process due to him playing a majority of the album's instruments. He also read and drew inspiration from the phrasing and prose of the works of Beat Generation poets, Arthur Rimbaud and James Joyce before and during the writing of the album.

After turning in the album, Heavy Metal received worried feedback regarding commercial success from Winter's record label, Partisan Records, his father, and his management. Executives at Partisan believed that it would not be financially successful, resulting in heated discussion between Winter and his associates. One comment from Partisan founder Tim Putnam — that the album wouldn't be successful enough for Winter to leave his parents' house — led to a press statement from Winter, saying "I'm young and not afraid of living with my parents." After reworking and removing songs from the album, the label was still not confident in its market viability, deciding to release the album in December during a dry month for reviews and year-end lists. After Heavy Metal was released and the album began to garner praise, both Winter's management and label conceded with Winter and began trusting his artistry more.

During the rollout of Heavy Metal, Winter made unsubstantiated and playful claims; these included that musicians sought from Craigslist and a 5-year-old boy as a bassist are featured on the album, that the album was recorded at multiple Guitar Center locations in New York City, moving each time he was kicked out, and that he recreationally took anticoagulants during pre-production. James Richardson, a guitarist for Real Estate and a long-time member of MGMT's live band, played guitar, trumpet, and French horn on various tracks.

== Release and reception ==
Professional ratings
Aggregate scores
Source	Rating
AnyDecentMusic?	8.4/10
Review scores
Source	Rating
The Line of Best Fit	9/10
Paste	8.9/10
Pitchfork	8.3/10

On October 22, 2024, Winter released the Singles EP featuring two songs that did not make the album: "Vines" and "Take It With You". The single "$0" was released via free download on Winter's website on November 13, with Heavy Metal being formally announced six days later for release through Partisan Records and Play It Again Sam on December 6, 2024.

Heavy Metal has received glowing reviews from critics. At Any Decent Music?, which weights the average rating out of 100 to reviews from mainstream critics, the album received a rating of 8.4 out of 10 based on 5 critic reviews.

Walden Green from Pitchfork gave Heavy Metal the website's "Best New Music" tag, calling the album "a project of catharsis that never comes across like an exercise in vanity, an outpouring of material as necessary to its creator as it is compelling to experience." Paste writer Alli Dempsey in a rave review says the album suggests that "Winter wants us to be in on the cosmic joke that guides his life, and informs his enlightening folk rock and pragmatic, anxious songwriting." Writing for The Line of Best Fit, Sophie Leigh Walker writes that the album is "torn between nihilism – a total loss of reason – and an acknowledgement of occasional beauty that makes you forget the rest, even for a moment." Additional positive reviews for Heavy Metal were also written by GQ and Uproxx. The album has been further praised by other musicians, such as Waxahatchee, who praised what she called a "casualness and stupidity to its complete and total airtight perfection", and Nick Cave, who paid special compliments to lyrics from "Drinking Age" and called Heavy Metal both "startling" and "wigged-out".

Musically the album has been described by Green as an album with "timeless arrangements that are by turns folksy, soulful, and neo-classical."

Heavy Metal was named one of the best debut albums of 2024 by Paste and an early entry for one of the best albums of 2025 by several publications, given its late 2024 release. Pitchfork ranked Heavy Metal as the third best album of 2025, and "Love Takes Miles" as the best song of 2025.

=== Rankings ===
Year-end rankings for Heavy Metal
Publication	Accolade	Rank	Ref.
Consequence	The 50 Best Albums of 2025	14	
The Line of Best Fit	The Best Albums of 2024 Ranked	28	
Mojo	The 75 Best Albums of 2025	46	
Paste	The 50 Best Albums of 2025	16	
Pitchfork	The 50 Best Albums of 2025	3	
Rolling Stone	The 100 Best Albums of 2025	32	
Rough Trade	Albums of the Year 2025	4 (Note: Tied for 4th place with Geese's album Getting Killed.)	

== Track listing ==
All tracks are written by Cameron Winter.

Heavy Metal track listing
No.	Title	Length
1.	"The Rolling Stones"	3:18
2.	"Nausicaä (Love Will Be Revealed)"	4:11
3.	"Love Takes Miles"	3:18
4.	"Drinking Age"	3:30
5.	"Cancer of the Skull"	5:31
6.	"Try as I May"	4:47
7.	"We're Thinking the Same Thing"	2:47
8.	"Nina + Field of Cops"	5:52
9.	"$0"	6:43
10.	"Can't Keep Anything"	3:49
Total length:		43:50

Live at St. John's Lutheran Church bonus 7" (Note: Included in the Album of the Year edition by Rough Trade.)
No.	Title	Length
13.	"Try as I May (Live at St. John's Lutheran Church)"	5:41
14.	"The Rolling Stones (Live at St. John's Lutheran Church)"	4:44
Total length:		10:25

== Personnel ==
Credits are adapted from the album's liner notes.

- Cameron Winter – vocals, piano, guitar, bass guitar, drum machine, keyboards, percussion

=== Additional musicians ===
- Loren Humphrey – drums, percussion, claps
- James Richardson – classical guitar (track 1), trumpet (track 2, 8), French horn (track 4-5, 8), acoustic guitar (track 5)
- Jesse Kontansky – strings; violin (track 6)
- Xan Aird – electric guitar (track 2)
- Peter Hess – saxophone, clarinet (track 5)

=== Technical ===
- Cameron Winter – producer, engineer, mixer
- Loren Humphrey – producer, engineer, mixer
- Lucas Carpenter – assistant engineer
- Ismael Pieter – design
- Tim Widden – drawings
- Adam Powell – photographer

== Charts ==
Chart performance for Heavy Metal
Chart (2025–2026)	Peak position
Danish Vinyl Albums (Hitlisten)	14
Irish Independent Albums (IRMA)	23
Scottish Albums (Official Charts)	31
UK Albums Sales (OCC)	34
UK Independent Albums (Official Charts)	10
US Top Current Album Sales (Billboard)	49
