= Online public relations =

Online public relations, also known as E-PR or digital PR, is the use of the internet to communicate in the public realm. It functions as the web relationship influence among internet users and it aims to make desirable comments about an organization, its products and services, news viewed by its target audiences and lessen its undesirable comments to a large degree. Online public relations shows differences from traditional public relations. One of these is associated with its platforms. Compared with traditional public relations channels (such as TV, radio and printed press), the network systems used for online public relations vary from search to social platforms. In the era of digital marketing, the major online public relations tools for the public relations professionals and marketers such as content marketing, search engine optimization are the results of mixture of digital technologies and public relations. Those approaches have become the mainstream digital marketing machines and learning to take advantage of these marketing tools is an essential part of modern public relations strategies.

== Differences between online and traditional public relations ==
- Organizations can communicate with audiences directly through a variety of online platforms instead of depending on the media channels only
- Audiences exposed to the information are linked to the network and then the flow of information is multi-directional among people
- Multiple sources of information provided can be accessible to audiences
- Audiences are entitled to the right to review, comment and assess
- Online PR targets social media, web searches, blogs, and websites in addition to targeting traditional media outlets.

== Generative AI and answer engines ==
By the mid-2020s, online public relations practice broadened to address how organizations are represented within responses produced by large language model-based search and answer systems, including ChatGPT, Google Gemini, Claude, Perplexity AI, and Google AI Overviews. Practitioners describe this work using overlapping terms such as generative engine optimization (GEO), answer engine optimization (AEO), and artificial intelligence optimization (AIO).

The shift reflects changes in user behavior. Reporting in the Financial Times documented a movement of consumer and business research activity from conventional search results toward conversational AI interfaces, with brands adapting communications and editorial strategies in response.

Academic research auditing generative AI search systems has found that such systems draw heavily on news and editorial sources when constructing answers, with citation patterns showing commercial and geographic bias. Trade research has begun mapping which entities dominate AI-generated responses across specific industry verticals, including healthcare, policy, and consumer markets. These findings have informed online public relations practice, which increasingly treats earned editorial coverage in credible third-party outlets as a signal that may influence inclusion in AI-generated responses.

== Tactics ==
Buzz marketing means marketers first identify the Alpha consumer in terms of a new idea and technologies and then promote specifically made messages such as a funny video or email with the help of the network of those Alpha consumers. One of the typical examples was that Paper Magazine issued a nearly naked image of Kim Kardashian on their cover, then viewers who saw the photo responded immediately and made it spread quickly. As the whole version had come out, nearly one percent of the entire web activities in the US got involved.

There are relevant worries about some counter-arguments about brands reputation. Marketers are responsible for coping with unfavorable mentions quickly through online reputation management such as Google Alerts to influence people' attitudes toward those negative comments.

The internet platforms provide organizations a variety of channels to issue timely news and information. The forms of information can vary from search to social to brand management platforms such as email alerts or news stories. These contents provided by organizations allow media channels to find news sources easily, which can increase the exposure of organizations and then improve public relations.

Link building is used to achieve and create hyperlinks to other third-party website or related site to help netizens to navigate between websites. Building high-quality links, even if the links are non-follow can have an effect on search result ranking and increase the flow of visitors to the site. Then finding partners websites to link and then increasing more traffic is involved in the daily work of online public relations professionals.

Beginning in the mid-2020s, the practice expanded to include the management of how organizations are represented inside generative artificial intelligence systems such as ChatGPT, Google Gemini, Claude, and Perplexity, which had begun to function as a primary discovery layer alongside traditional search engines.

== Measurement ==
Online public relations measurement traditionally focused on metrics such as media impressions, share of voice, sentiment, and website referral traffic. With the growth of generative AI as a discovery layer, practitioner and analyst publications have described an additional class of metrics tracking how often, and in what context, a brand or organization is cited within responses produced by large language model interfaces. Industry publications have proposed standing research indices that quantify the share of AI-generated answers attributable to specific entities within a given category, applying a consistent methodology across verticals such as health, finance, consumer goods, and crisis communications. A number of analytics platforms emerged in the mid-2020s offering monitoring of brand mentions, citation frequency, and sentiment across systems including ChatGPT, Perplexity, Gemini, and Google AI Overviews.

== See also ==
- Generative engine optimization
- Reputation management
- Digital marketing
- Content marketing
- Search engine optimization
- Instant answer
