= Geese (band) =

American rock band

- Geese in 2026. From left: Dominic DiGesu, Emily Green, Cameron Winter, Max Bassin

Background information
- Origin: New York City, U.S.
- Genres: Indie rock; art rock; post-punk; experimental rock
- Years active: 2016–present
- Labels: Partisan; PIAS
- Members: Cameron Winter; Emily Green; Dominic DiGesu; Max Bassin
- Past members: Foster Hudson
- Website: geeseband.com

Geese is an American rock band from New York City that formed in 2016. It comprises lead vocalist and guitarist-keyboardist Cameron Winter, guitarist Emily Green, bassist Dominic DiGesu and drummer Max Bassin as of 2024. Guitarist Foster Hudson was a member of the group from 2019 until 2023. During live performances, the band is joined by keyboardist Sam Revaz.

Formed while the members were attending high school, the group recorded early material in Bassin's basement before signing with Partisan Records and Play it Again Sam in 2020. The band has released four studio albums: A Beautiful Memory (2018), Projector (2021), 3D Country (2023), and Getting Killed (2025).

The band's sound blends indie rock, art rock, post-punk, and experimental rock. The members cited the Velvet Underground, Television, the Strokes and Radiohead as influences. Winter's vocal style has been noted by critics for its versatility and stylistic range.

== History ==
=== 2016–2020: Formation and early years ===
The band formed in 2016 while the members were attending Brooklyn Friends School and Little Red School House in New York City. During high school, the band practised and recorded material in the basement of Bassin's home in Fort Greene. The first song the band played together after forming was Tame Impala's "Mind Mischief". The band's name came from guitarist Emily Green's nickname "Goose".

They independently released EP, their debut EP, in 2018, followed by an album, A Beautiful Memory, the same year, and a second EP, Bottomless Pink Lagoon, in 2019. All three of these releases have since been removed from streaming platforms.

As a few of the members had received acceptance letters to attend schools such as Oberlin College and the Berklee College of Music, the band had intended to break up once they graduated high school in 2020. Towards mid-2020, however, the band's self-produced demos attracted attention from several record labels, including 4AD, Fat Possum, and Sub Pop. Ultimately, the band signed with Partisan Records.

=== 2021–2023: Projector ===
The band released their second album and label debut, Projector, on October 29, 2021 on Partisan Records. It was recorded by the band in Bassin's basement from late 2019 to early 2020, and mixed by Dan Carey. Debut single "Disco" was premiered by Apple Music 1 on June 22, 2021, with Winter telling host Matt Wilkinson about the recording process in Bassin's basement: "It was the first time we got our live set-up working, so we bought a couple more microphones to mic everything properly so we could all play it together instead of overdubbing everything. It was this transcendental moment where we were all really in the zone."

=== 2023–2024: 3D Country and Hudson's departure ===
The band released their third studio album, 3D Country on June 23, 2023. It was produced by James Ford. The album had four singles released ahead of the release: "Cowboy Nudes", "3D Country", "Mysterious Love", and "I See Myself". On October 13, 2023, the band released the corresponding EP, 4D Country, featuring unreleased songs from the 3D Country recording sessions.

On December 22, 2023, Geese announced on social media platforms that the guitarist Foster Hudson would be leaving the band to focus on his academic efforts, and that the band would continue as a quartet.

=== 2024–present: Getting Killed and forthcoming fifth studio album ===
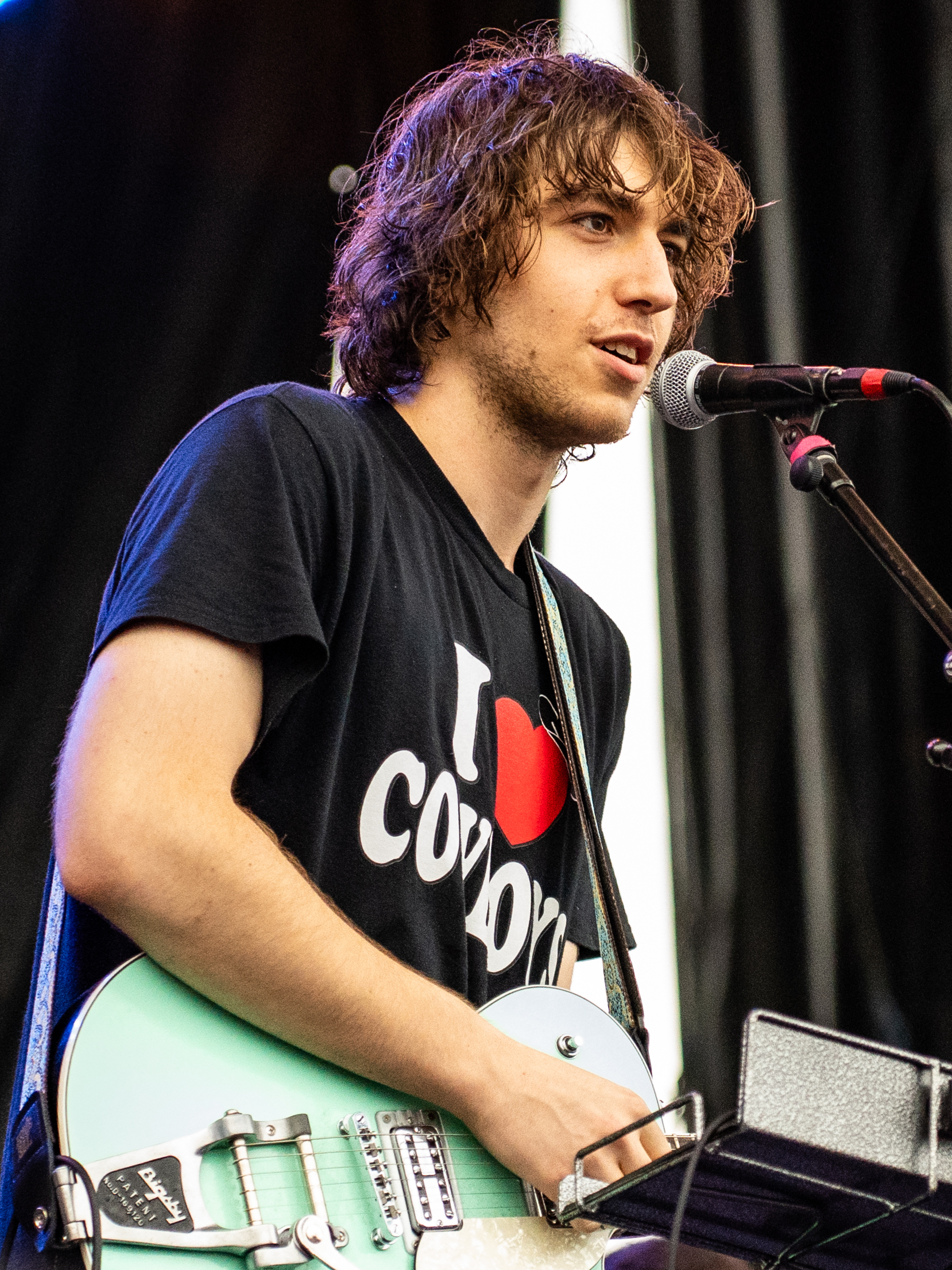
Cameron Winter performing for Geese in 2024

In 2024, Geese was picked up by King Gizzard & the Lizard Wizard as the openers for the first American leg of their world tour. Avowed fans of the band, Gizzard heavily praised 3D Country, and Geese would cover Gizzard tunes in their set, such as "Invisible Face" off their 2016 effort Nonagon Infinity. Winter would then go on to release his debut solo album, Heavy Metal, on December 6, 2024. The tour and album received widespread critical acclaim, increasing Winter and Geese's exposure significantly in the months following the album's release.

In April and May 2024, Geese opened up for Greta Van Fleet on the North American Starcatcher tour.

On June 23, 2025, Geese announced a headlining North American tour.

On July 8, the band announced their fourth studio album, Getting Killed, and simultaneously released its first single, "Taxes". Winter leaked the single "Trinidad" on July 24 during an Instagram livestream. The song was formally released on July 29. On August 28, the single "100 Horses" was released and a European tour was announced. The full album released on September 26 to widespread critical acclaim. "Getting Killed" appeared on numerous year-end lists and was named the best album of 2025 by Stereogum and The New Yorker.

On October 1, Geese performed "Taxes" on Jimmy Kimmel Live!.

In an interview with GQ, it was revealed that the band were recording a potential fifth studio album with producer Kenny Beats during the month of August 2025, with one future track title, "Lyin", revealed during the profile. Winter later disputed the sessions, stating: "That's overblown. I want to put that to rest, because I feel so bad, everyone's getting so excited about it. [A fifth album is] not really what's happening – we're just kind of dicking around [...] That's basically a rumour that GQ has propagated." Drummer Max Bassin elaborated: "To be entirely honest, I want to say maybe [we have been recording an album], but also then I'll talk to Cameron and he'll say 'it's not done. It's not even anywhere done, we've got to cut half of these songs'. So we'll see."

In January 2026, Geese performed "Au Pays du Cocaine" and "Trinidad" on Saturday Night Live from their album Getting Killed. The band also played at various major festivals throughout 2026, such as Coachella, Lollapalooza, Primavera Sound, Bonnaroo and Laneway. Upcoming festival appearances include Reading and Leeds, Lowlands, Pukkelpop and a Thursday night headline performance at End of the Road.

==== Psy-op allegations ====
On April 14, 2026, Wired published an article by John Semley titled "The Fanfare Around the Band Geese Actually Was a Psyop". The article expanded on a Substack post by musician Eliza McLamb highlighting the connection between the public relations company Chaotic Good Projects and "alternative" acts, in particular Cameron Winter and Geese. Quoting from a Billboard interview, she called attention to what Chaotic Good described as "narrative campaigns" which includes creating hundreds of fake social media accounts to drown out comment sections and manipulate algorithms on social media sites such as TikTok. In response to the Wired piece, Chaotic Good removed mention of Cameron Winter, Geese and narrative campaigns from their website, though co-founder Adam Tarsia confirmed to Wired later that month that they did engineer campaigns for both Cameron Winter and Geese.

The Wired article sparked debate over whether Geese's involvement with Chaotic Good Projects is noteworthy, with some writers saying that many mainstream artists also engage with the same type of algorithmic manipulation. McLamb herself said that she "[does] not consider Geese to be a 'psy-op'" and did not intend for her initial Substack post to be a hit piece.

== Musical style and influences ==
Geese's music has been described as indie rock, art rock, post-punk, and experimental rock. The members have said they are influenced by the Velvet Underground, Television, the Strokes, Yeah Yeah Yeahs, Radiohead, Women, Deerhunter, Animal Collective, Ween, the Rolling Stones, Led Zeppelin, Harry Nilsson, the Beatles and Funkadelic.

The band's sound has been compared to a wide array of other New York bands, as well as contemporary British Windmill scene groups such as Black Midi and Squid.

Their music has been compared to "NYC guitar zone-out Zen masters like Television, the Feelies, and Parquet Courts; the early-'00s neo-new wave and dance-punk of the Strokes, the Rapture, and LCD Soundsystem; scads of art-spaz stuff from DNA to Deerhoof to Black Midi; and even a flash of prog touchstones like Yes and Radiohead."

Describing the vocals of Cameron Winter on Projector, Jon Dolan of Rolling Stone said that Winter "can hoist his voice into a Thom Yorke-an falsetto, put on a posh pout à la Julian Casablancas or Ian McCulloch of Echo & the Bunnymen, or lapse into a stentorian yawp that brings to mind Mark E. Smith of the Fall or Arctic Monkeys' Alex Turner. Sometimes you can hear it all cross-pollinating within the space of the same three-minute song, making for an album that rewards both short attention spans and deep listening." Ian Blau of Rolling Stone said that "Winter shines throughout [3D Country]. Whether exercising his impressive falsetto on 'I See Myself', or shape-shifting between a yelp, spoken word, and nasally chant on the standout track 'Mysterious Love', or showcasing a more robust version of Alex Turner-style crooning on the eponymous single, '3D Country', he contorts his voice to fit any set of lyrics or musical style."

== Members ==
Current members

- Cameron Winter – lead vocals, keyboards (2016–present), guitar (2024–present)
- Emily Green – guitar (2016–present)
- Dominic DiGesu – bass (2016–present)
- Max Bassin – drums (2016–present)

Current touring musicians

- Sam Revaz – keyboards, keytar, sampler (2022–present)

Former members

- Foster Hudson – guitar, additional vocals (2019–2023)

Timeline

Geese performing in Boston; August 19, 2024

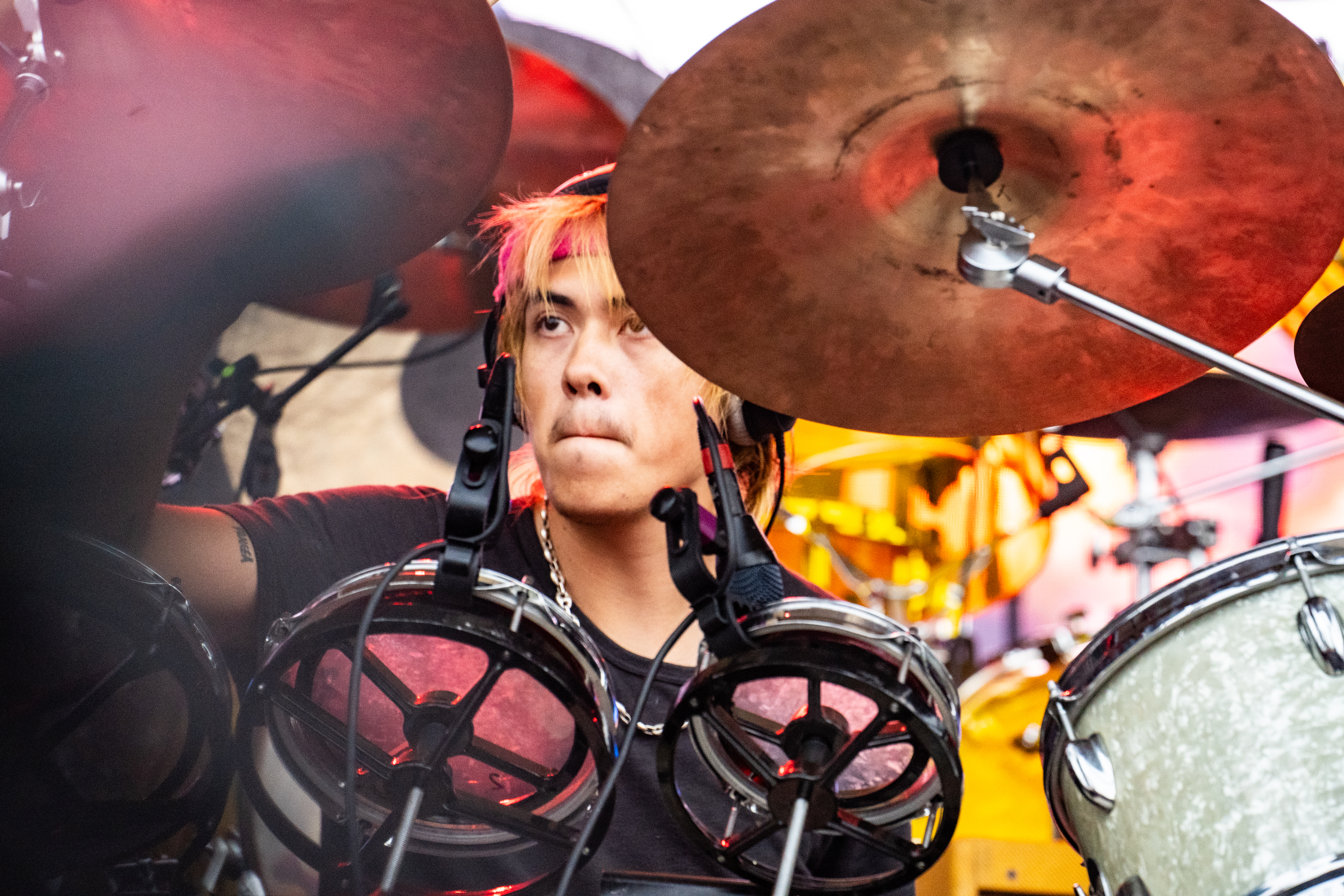
Max Bassin

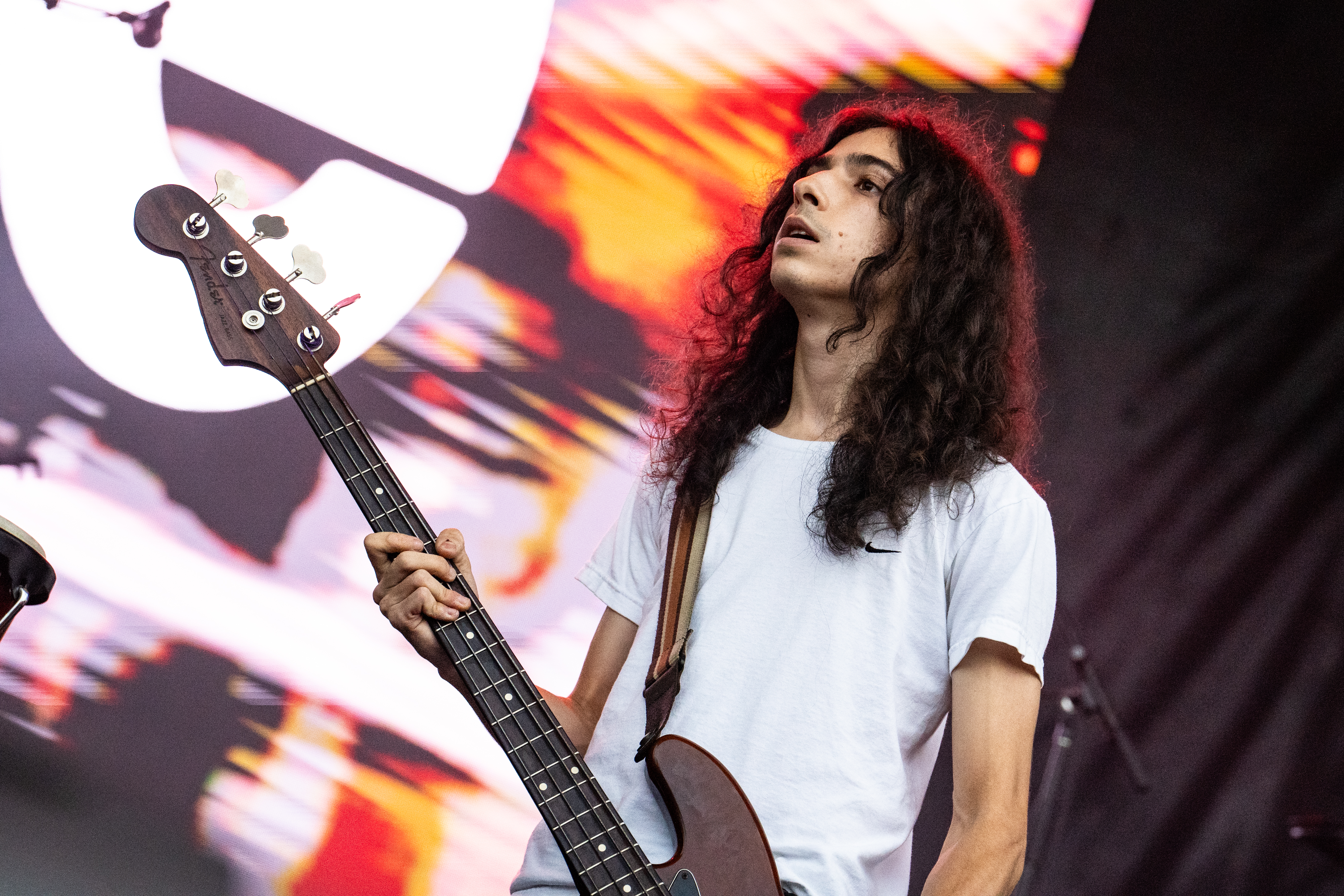
Dominic DiGesu

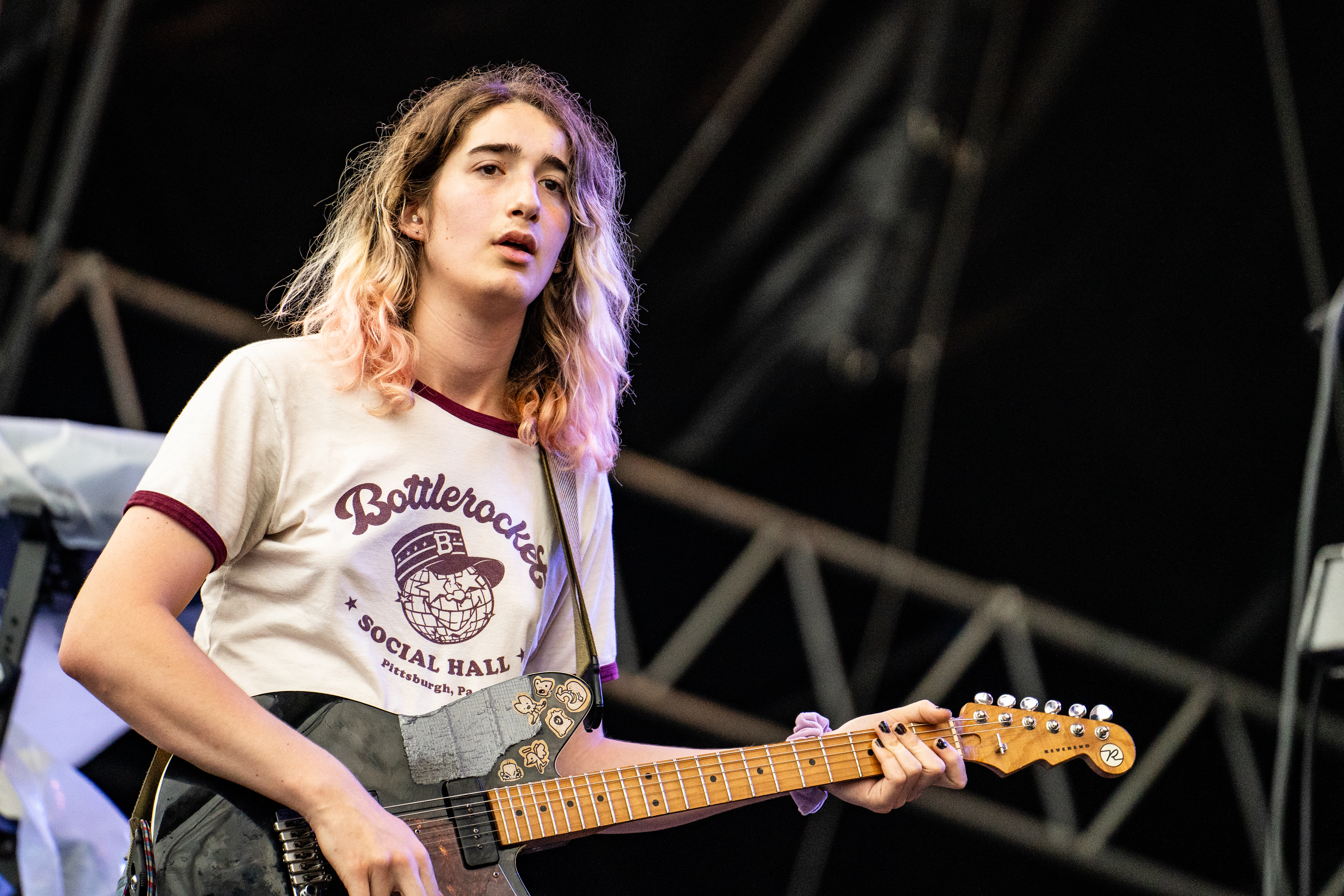
Emily Green

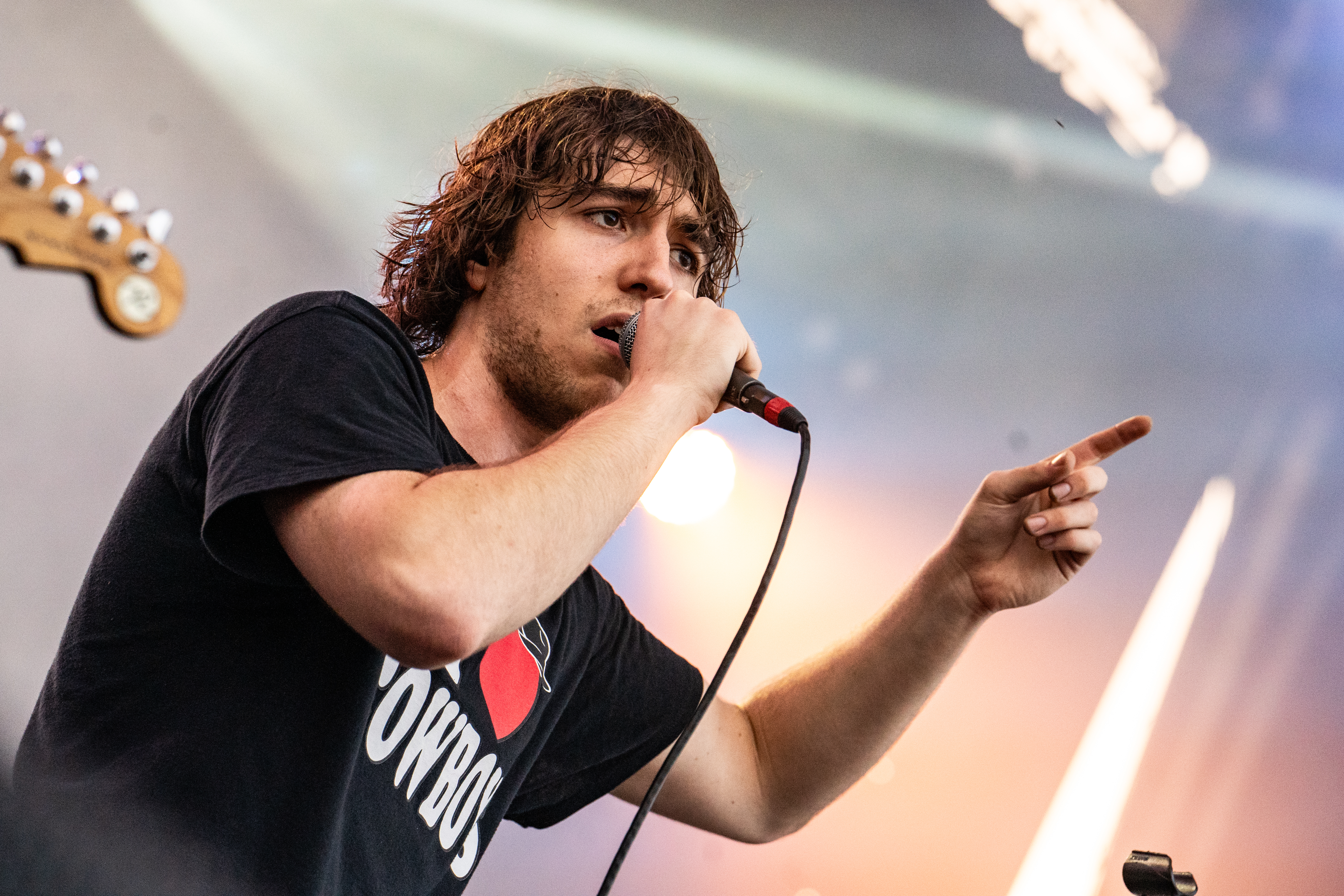
Cameron Winter

== Discography ==
- A Beautiful Memory (2018)
- Projector (2021)
- 3D Country (2023)
- Getting Killed (2025)

== Tours ==
=== Headlining ===
- Projector Tour (2021–2022)
- 3D Country Tour (2023)
- Getting Killed World Tour (2025–2026)

=== Opening act ===
- Greta Van Fleet – Starcatcher Tour (2024)
- King Gizzard & the Lizard Wizard – World Tour 2024 (first US leg) (2024)
- Vampire Weekend – Only God Was Above Us Tour Part 2 (2025)

== Awards and nominations ==
Award	Year	Nominee(s) / Work(s)	Category	Result	Ref.
American Music Awards	2026	Geese	Breakthrough Rock/Alternative Artist	Nominated	
BBC Radio 1	2026	Geese	Sound of 2026	Fourth	
Brit Awards	2026	Geese	International Group of the Year	Won	
Libera Awards	2026	Geese	Breakthrough Artist	Won	
Libera Awards	2026	Getting Killed	Record of the Year	Won	
Libera Awards	2026	Getting Killed	Best Alternative Rock Record	Won	
Libera Awards	2026	Getting Killed	Marketing Genius	Won	
Libera Awards	2026	"Taxes"	Music Video of the Year	Nominated	
MTV Video Music Awards	2026	"Taxes"	Best Alternative	Nominated	
MTV Video Music Awards	2026	Geese	Best Group	Nominated	
Grammy Awards	2027	"Trinidad"	Best Rock Performance	Pending	
Grammy Awards	2027	"Trinidad"	Best Rock Song	Pending	
Grammy Awards	2027	"Au Pays Du Cocaine"	Best Alternative Music Performance	Pending	
Grammy Awards	2027	Getting Killed	Best Alternative Music Album	Pending	
Grammy Awards	2027	Geese	Best New Artist	Pending	
