= Projector (Geese album) =

Studio album by Geese
- Released: October 29, 2021
- Recorded: 2019–2020
- Studio: The Nest
- Genres: Post-punk; art rock
- Length: 41:13
- Labels: Partisan; PIAS
- Producer: Geese

Geese chronology
Bottomless Pink Lagoon (2019)	Projector (2021)	3D Country (2023)

Singles from Projector
- 1. "Disco" Released: June 22, 2021; 2. "Low Era" Released: August 24, 2021; 3. "Projector" Released: September 22, 2021

Projector is the second (Note: While this album is advertised by Geese as their debut, and is their debut under a record label, it is technically their second studio album counting their since-removed 2018 debut album A Beautiful Memory.) studio album and major label debut by American indie rock band Geese. The album was released on October 29, 2021, through Partisan Records and Play It Again Sam.

The band wrote and recorded the album while attending high school, originally uploading the album to SoundCloud before being signed to a record label. It was mixed by producer Dan Carey and preceded by three singles: "Disco", "Low Era", and "Projector". Projector received a warm reception upon its release.

== Background and recording ==
Recording for Projector began in late 2019 and finished in early 2020, while the band members were in their senior year of high school. The album was primarily recorded in drummer Max Bassin's basement, named "the Nest", made out of recording equipment given to Bassin by his family. After recording, Projector was silently released onto their SoundCloud account before being discovered by Willie Upbin, who signed on as the band's manager.

After sending the record to A&R representatives from numerous indie labels, the band settled with Partisan Records due to the band seeing their place in the music industry as "the best of the worst". The final release of Projector received a final mix and mastering by Dan Carey and Bernie Grundman respectively.

== Critical reception ==
Professional ratings
Aggregate scores
Source	Rating
Metacritic	83/100
Review scores
Source	Rating
AllMusic	4/5 stars
Beats Per Minute	80%
Classic Rock	4.5/5 stars
Consequence	A+
DIY	3.5/5 stars
NME	4/5 stars
Pitchfork	6.6/10
Rolling Stone	4/5 stars

Projector has been described as a post-punk and an art rock album. The album received widespread critical acclaim upon its release. On review aggregator website, Metacritic, Projector has an average critic score of 83 out of 100, indicating "universal acclaim based on eight critic reviews".

== Track listing ==
All tracks are written by Geese.

Projector track listing
No.	Title	Length
1.	"Rain Dance"	3:23
2.	"Low Era"	4:14
3.	"Fantasies / Survival"	4:27
4.	"First World Warrior"	3:11
5.	"Disco"	6:47
6.	"Projector"	4:25
7.	"Exploding House"	6:04
8.	"Bottle"	3:31
9.	"Opportunity Is Knocking"	5:06
Total length:		41:13

== Personnel ==
Credits adapted from the album's liner notes.

=== Geese ===
- Max Bassin – drums
- Dominic DiGesu – bass guitar
- Emily Green (Note: Credited in initial releases under her deadname.) – lead guitar
- Foster Hudson – rhythm guitar
- Cameron Winter – vocals, keyboards

=== Technical ===
- Geese – production, writing, recording
- Dan Carey – mixing
- Bernie Grundman – mastering

=== Additional contributors ===
- Landon Yast – cover art
- Piotr Lapinski – additional artwork
- UNDERCARD - design
- Matt de Jong - design
- Jaime-James Medina - design
