= Getting Killed =

Studio album by Geese
- Released: September 26, 2025
- Recorded: January 2025
- Studio: Putnam Hill (Los Angeles)
- Genres: Art rock; indie rock; experimental rock
- Length: 45:35
- Labels: Partisan; PIAS
- Producers: Kenneth Blume; Geese

Geese chronology
Alive & in Person (2024)	Getting Killed (2025)	Live at Third Man Records (2026)

Geese studio albums chronology
3D Country (2023)	Getting Killed (2025)

Singles from Getting Killed
- 1. "Taxes" Released: July 8, 2025; 2. "Trinidad" Released: July 29, 2025; 3. "100 Horses" Released: August 26, 2025; 4. "Au Pays du Cocaine" / "Cobra" Released: February 13, 2026

Getting Killed is the fourth (Note: While this album is advertised by Geese as their third, and is their third under a record label, it is their fourth album counting their since-delisted 2018 debut album, A Beautiful Memory.) album by the American rock band Geese, released on September 26, 2025, on Partisan Records and Play It Again Sam. The album marked the band's first release as a quartet following the departure of guitarist Foster Hudson in late 2023 to pursue academia. It was recorded in January 2025 at producer Kenneth Blume's Putnam Hill studio in Los Angeles, one month after the release of frontman Cameron Winter's debut solo album, Heavy Metal (2024).

Musically, it is categorized as an art rock, indie rock, and experimental rock album. The album was shaped by extended jam sessions and an emphasis on rhythmic repetition, abrasive textures, and unconventional song structures. Winter's vocal performance is a prominent feature, ranging from restrained crooning to strained, expressive outbursts, while the lyrics employ surreal imagery and recurring themes of violence, power, and transformation.

The album was preceded by the singles "Taxes", "Trinidad", and "100 Horses", and further supported by the singles "Cobra" and "Au Pays du Cocaine", and a headlining tour beginning in October 2025. It received critical acclaim, and was named among the best albums of 2025 by several publications, with The New Yorker and Stereogum placing it at number one. Commercially, it charted at number 96 on the Billboard 200, and topped the UK Independent Albums Chart.

== Background ==
Following the release of their third album 3D Country (2023), Geese transitioned from a quintet to a quartet. The departure of guitarist Foster Hudson was formally announced on 22 December 2023, attributed to his decision to pursue academic work, leaving frontman Cameron Winter, guitarist Emily Green, bassist Dominic DiGesu, and drummer Max Bassin as the band's core members. With Hudson gone, Winter assumed a larger share of the guitar arrangements on the new material. DiGesu and Green later described the lineup change as a motivating factor that compelled them to refine their collaborative approach.

Geese's collaboration with producer Kenneth Blume, a.k.a. Kenny Beats, began informally in mid-2024, when Blume encountered the band's merchandise and became curious about their work. The two met at the Austin City Limits Music Festival in October 2024, where Blume expressed an enthusiasm for leaving imperfections intact—an attitude Winter regarded as a rare and liberating approach for a rock-adjacent producer. Geese spent several days that November at Putnam Hill, Blume's newly built studio in Los Angeles, to develop preliminary demos. Blume initially found the material structurally chaotic, though his view shifted after hearing a solo project Winter released later that year, which clarified the songs' internal logic and convinced him of the project's potential.

The release of Winter's solo album Heavy Metal on December 6, 2024 generated an unexpected impact of critical attention. Despite modest expectations from the label, the album became a cult success and was acclaimed for its songwriting and vocal experimentation. Its reception drew new attention to Geese's work and heightened anticipation for their next release. He later stated that the success of the solo album increased his confidence and informed his intention to make Getting Killed a louder and more forceful record than its predecessor.

== Recording and production ==
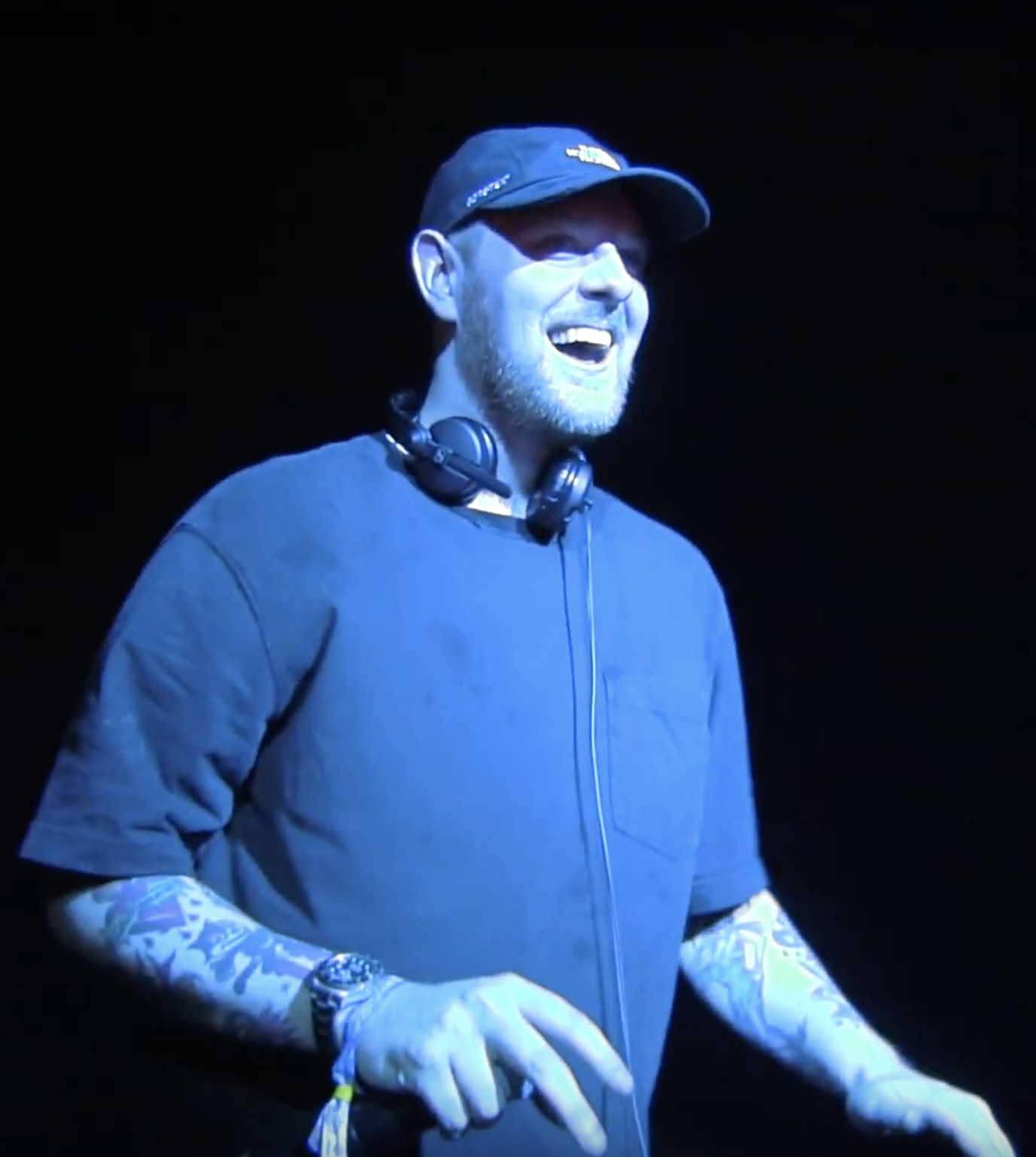
Getting Killed was recorded and produced at Kenneth Blume's studio (pictured)

Recording took place in January 2025 at the Putnam Hill studio, and Getting Killed was produced by the band itself alongside Kenneth Blume. The overall process was recorded over a ten-day period, with the band working fourteen-hour days while the Southern California wildfires filled the Los Angeles air with smoke and ash. Winter described the process as a "waking nightmare until it's mastered", and the band arrived with around twenty demos that were often incomplete, forcing them to write, restructure, and refine material in real time. Much of the album emerged from extended thirty-minute jam sessions centered on repetitive grooves, which Bassin characterized as explorations of patterns that "feel almost like they don't end".

Blume, who is known for his work in hip-hop, informed an emphasis on the rhythm section, resulting in Bassin's drumming operating in what Under the Radar writer Mark Moody called "maximum overdrive" and in bass and drum performances being tracked repeatedly until they could support the album's more experimental textures. The production also incorporated deliberately abrasive or unconventional elements across the album. The group spent one session selecting a single handclap sample from a folder of roughly 7,000 options, an example they later noted had briefly delayed completion of the associated song. Winter's vocal recording process swung between extremes, with some takes captured immediately and others requiring more than forty attempts in order to push his voice into the desired emotionally frayed state.

== Musical style ==
=== Overview ===
Getting Killed has been described by journalists as art rock, indie rock, and experimental rock with additional elements and influences including jazz, no wave funk, progressive rock, noise music, and motorik-inspired rhythmic patterns. The album consists of eleven tracks with a total running time of 45 minutes. The compositions rely on cyclical rhythmic figures, recurrent motifs, and definitive structures that unfold gradually rather than toward conventional hook-driven climaxes. Winter's vocal performance has been described as a central element to the band's sound. His delivery ranges from soft baritone crooning to strained, cracking shouts, drawing occasional comparisons to Thom Yorke of Radiohead and Mick Jagger of the Rolling Stones. The lyrics are dense and allusive, combining biblical imagery and surreal or absurd scenarios.

=== Songs ===
The opening track "Trinidad" establishes the album's volatile and chaotic tone, featuring the uncommon time signature of 13/8. It features jagged guitars, explosive percussion, erratic bursts of brass, and layers of discordant noise. Critics compared the sound to "Radiohead on PCP" or a funk ensemble pushed into noise-rock extremes. Winter's vocals alternate between languid phrasing and sharp, shrieking outbursts. The refrain, "There's a bomb in my car!", forms one of the album's most memorable lines, and the Australian musician Nick Cave remarked that the shift into the chorus creates a moment in which "all worry is laid to waste". "Cobra" introduces a more melodic and relaxed atmosphere. Its breezy textures recall a Beach Boys-adjacent palette, while Winter's vocals adopt a crooning tone that Holly Hazelwood of Spectrum Culture interpreted as evidence of his potential as a "neo-crooner". The song blends interlocking guitar melodies and nostalgia with an attempt to subvert pop conventions. "Husbands" is built on a steady, metronomic drum pattern and supple guitar lines reminiscent of the John Frusciante period of Red Hot Chili Peppers. It incorporates elements of gospel-inflected harmony, extended groove-based structure, and R&B-tinged lo-fi production. The track conveys a sense of being burdened by a city for which there remains affection, as reflected in Winter's line "I'll repeat what I say, but I'll never explain".

The title track "Getting Killed" begins with an upbeat, crunchy rhythm before resolving into a more settled groove. It features a blues-derived guitar line and a sampled Ukrainian choral passage described by Rachel Aroesti of The Guardian as a "frantic pile-up of voices and grooves". Writing for Exclaim!, Eric Hill likened the song's character to a "Julian Casablancas-fronted Black Crowes". "Islands of Men" opens with a steady bass figure and gradually develops its warm atmosphere over six minutes. The track has been described as swaying boogie rock that transitions into something more ethereal as it proceeds. "100 Horses", a rapid, high-energy piece built on repetitive, militant grooves, leans heavily into funk-inflected rhythm and percussive force. Bassin's drumming dominates the arrangement, and Winter's lyrics engage in a "pantomime of American imperialism", with lines such as "There is only dance music in times of war" and "All people must die scared or else die nervous" linking the track to the album's broader critique of violence and power. "Half Real" evokes a Tom Waits-like preacherly tone and draws on a bar-room atmosphere marked by drones reminiscent of the Velvet Underground's "Venus in Furs". Winter's vocal performance leans into a spoken-sung delivery as he contemplates extreme personal erasure: "I've got half a mind, to just pay for the lobotomy... I've got no more thinking to do".

Described by MusicOMH's John Murphy as of the album's most subdued tracks, "Au Pays du Cocaine" adopts a gentle, swaying mood and highlights Winter's baritone, rendered in a manner akin to a post-punk crooner. Its melodic structure recalls a folk lullaby. The lyrics address a reluctant partner with lines such as "You can be free and still come home" and "Baby you can change and still choose me". "Bow Down" reintroduces a dense, energetic style, characterized by a sharp guitar-and-drum interlock and a rhythmic language described by Murphy as "jerky math-rock". The track reshapes a staccato riff into an off-kilter dance figure. Winter addresses transformation and shifting identity through metaphors such as "I was a sailor, and now I'm a boat... I was a car, and now I'm the road", giving the song a chant-like quality that reinterprets elements of the band's earlier post-punk style. "Taxes" is constructed around a polyrhythmic introduction that abruptly opens into wide, chiming guitar arrangements. The track has been described as a cathartic rock anthem, with Winter's vocals combining desperation and melodic clarity. The lyrics incorporate biblical references and bleak humor, exemplified by "If you want me to pay my taxes / You'd better come over with a crucifix / You're gonna have to nail me down". "Long Island City Here I Come" builds in intensity and volume. The final section features Winter's voice gradually receding into a stream-of-consciousness monologue involving images such as "Microphones hidden under your bed" and apocalyptic anxieties.

== Artwork ==
The cover features Green in a white dress, her appearance being obfuscated by a lens flare. In her right hand is a trumpet held closely to her face, while the left hand holds a revolver pointed directly at the camera. The image was shot on photographer Mark Sommerfeld's rooftop in Ridgewood, Queens with additional editing by Kyle Berger to position the sun correctly. The cover for Getting Killed has been compared to the cover for Vision Creation Newsun by Japanese band Boredoms. Creative director Phil Gibson said that he was inspired by depictions of death in paintings by artists Sascha Schneider and Thomas Cole, as well as in movies like The Seventh Seal. The direction of the album art also came from playing around with the title of Getting Killed.

The real fun was considering the perspective of the title ‘Getting Killed.’ Who or what is getting killed? Who or what is doing the killing? Are we picking a side or leaving it to interpretation?

— Phil Gibson on conceptualizing the cover for Getting Killed, in an interview with The Fader.

== Release ==
On June 23, 2025, the band announced that the band would be embarking on a North American headlining tour in support of their forthcoming fourth album. The tour began in South Burlington, Vermont on October 10, and concluded in Brooklyn, New York on November 21. The album had not yet been formally titled at the time of the tour announcement; it was officially announced on 8 July 2025, when Geese revealed the title and track listing and released the lead single, "Taxes". The song was accompanied by a music video featuring disorienting imagery of moshing crowds and staged violence, reflecting the album's abrasive and surreal tone. On 24 July 2025, frontman Cameron Winter leaked the album's opening track, "Trinidad", during an Instagram Live stream filmed in Newport, Rhode Island. Winter stated that he wanted to deliver the song "directly to the people", and the track was subsequently issued through official channels shortly thereafter. The song was officially released five days later, on July 29. The final single released ahead of the album was "100 Horses", which arrived on 26 August 2025. Its release coincided with the announcement of the European leg of the Getting Killed World Tour, scheduled for March 2026. The tour includes dates across mainland Europe, followed by five shows in the United Kingdom, including performances in Bristol, Glasgow, Leeds, Manchester, and London. Additional dates were added in London and Glasgow following strong ticket demand. Geese premiered the song "Cobra" on BBC Radio 1 a day before the album's release on September 25, 2025, where host Jack Saunders labeled the song as the "Hottest Record" of the night.

Getting Killed was released on September 26 through Partisan Records and Play It Again Sam. A day after the album's release, the band played a free show in Greenpoint, Brooklyn, outside the headquarters of The Lot Radio. It was attended by thousands of people. A music video for "Au Pays du Cocaine" was released on October 8, which depicted Winter interacting with a baby in a surreal domestic scenario. Geese also supported the album with television and studio performances, including an appearance on Jimmy Kimmel Live! performing "Taxes". On November 20, the band became the first act in nearly three years to appear on the From the Basement series run by record producer Nigel Godrich, recording a 35-minute set drawn largely from the album. Geese appeared as musical guests on Saturday Night Live on January 24, 2026, with their setlist including "Au Pays du Cocaine" and "Trinidad".

== Critical reception ==
Professional ratings
Aggregate scores
Source	Rating
AnyDecentMusic?	8.7/10
Metacritic	89/100
Review scores
Source	Rating
AllMusic	4/5 stars
Exclaim!	6/10
The Guardian	4/5 stars
The Line of Best Fit	9/10
Mojo	4/5 stars
MusicOMH	5/5 stars
NME	5/5 stars
Paste	10/10
Pitchfork	9.0/10
Slant Magazine	4/5 stars

Getting Killed has received acclaim from critics. At Metacritic, which assigns a weighted average rating out of 100 to reviews from mainstream critics, Getting Killed received a rating of 89 out of 100 based on nineteen critic reviews, indicating "universal acclaim". Similarly, on AnyDecentMusic?, it received a rating of 8.7 out of 10, based on 22 reviews.

Sam Sodomsky, writing for Pitchfork, designated the album with its "Best New Music" tag, writing that Getting Killed is Geese's "strangest and strongest work". He characterized the album as "anxious, fragmented music" that rejects traditional rock structures in favor of groove-driven repetition and abrupt emotional shifts, noting that the band balances paranoia, tenderness, and humor while embracing what he described as a "restless, untameable curiosity". The Guardian's Rachel Aroesti gave the album four out of five stars and wrote that Getting Killed "can be opaque, but its brilliance is still obvious", praising its blend of sonic dissonance and surreal, sardonic lyricism. Devin Birse, writing for The Line of Best Fit, wrote that Getting Killed is "the work of a real band", describing it as "Geese at their most honest and sincere" and arguing that it "cements them as no longer excellent imitators, but worthy equals". Writing for Beats Per Minute, John Amen gave the album a "recommended" score, writing that, with Getting Killed, "Geese radicalize the conventional, adopting recognizable approaches but with that insurrectional flair so integral to their DNA".

Rhian Daly from NME, wrote that Getting Killed is "another exhilaratingly free-spirited turn" for Geese, praising the band's ability to balance "erratic but original" ideas while remaining in control of the album's shifting textures. In a review published by Stereogum, Chris DeVille characterized Getting Killed as "an apocalyptic album for apocalyptic times". The critic emphasized the album's unruly structure and improvisatory drive, arguing that Geese push beyond conventional rock forms while retaining a sharp sense of irony, ultimately casting the band as "prospective messiahs for Gen Z rock 'n' roll". Eric Hill from Exclaim! praised Geese's musicianship and flair for classic rock pastiche while suggesting that Getting Killed feels more like stylistic experimentation than a fully realized artistic statement.

At the 69th Annual Grammy Awards, Getting Killed is nominated for Best Alternative Music Album. Furthermore, "Trinidad" is nominated for Best Rock Performance and Best Rock Song. "Au Pays du Cocaine" is nominated for Best Alternative Music Performance. The album also secured them a nomination for Best New Artist. These mark the band's first Grammy nominations.

=== Rankings ===
Year-end rankings for Getting Killed
Publication	Accolade	Rank	Ref.
The Alternative	The Alt's 50 Best Albums of 2025	3	
Consequence	The 50 Best Albums of 2025	2	
Exclaim!	Exclaim!'s 50 Best Albums of 2025	2	
The Line of Best Fit	The Best Albums of 2025 Ranked	3	
Mojo	The 75 Best Albums of 2025	32	
The New Yorker	The Best Albums of 2025 (Amanda Petrusich's List)	1	
NME	The 50 Best Albums of 2025	1	
Our Culture	The 100 Best Albums of 2025	2	
Paste	The 50 Best Albums of 2025	3	
Pitchfork	The 50 Best Albums of 2025	7	
Rolling Stone	The 100 Best Albums of 2025	5	
Rough Trade	Albums of the Year 2025	4 (Note: Tied for 4th place with frontman Cameron Winter's solo album, Heavy Metal.)	
The Skinny	The Skinny's Albums of 2025	2	
Stereogum	The 50 Best Albums Of 2025	1	
Time Out	The 25 Best Albums of 2025	3	

== Track listing ==
All lyrics are written by Cameron Winter; all music is composed by Winter, Max Bassin, Dominic DiGesu, and Emily Green.

Getting Killed track listing
No.	Title	Length
1.	"Trinidad"	3:44
2.	"Cobra"	3:05
3.	"Husbands"	4:08
4.	"Getting Killed"	4:44
5.	"Islands of Men"	5:54
6.	"100 Horses"	3:46
7.	"Half Real"	3:22
8.	"Au Pays du Cocaine"	3:30
9.	"Bow Down"	3:28
10.	"Taxes"	3:17
11.	"Long Island City Here I Come"	6:37
Total length:		45:35

== Personnel ==
Credits adapted from the album's liner notes.

=== Geese ===
- Max Bassin – drums, production
- Dominic DiGesu – bass, production
- Emily Green – guitar, production
- Cameron Winter – vocals, guitar, keyboards, production, mixing, back cover photo

=== Additional contributors ===
==== Musicians ====
- JPEGMafia – additional vocals on "Trinidad"
- Nick Lee – trombone on "Trinidad", "Islands of Men", and "100 Horses"
- Aaron Paris – violin on "Trinidad", "Husbands", and "Bow Down"

==== Technical ====
- Kenneth Blume – production
- Loren Humphrey – engineering on "Trinidad"
- Daniel McNeill – engineering
- Beatriz Artola – mixing
- Felix Davis – mastering

==== Art ====
- When C/O Phil Gibson – creative direction, design
- Mark Sommerfeld – photography, cover art
- Kyle Berger – cover art
- Eve Alpert – photography assistance

== Charts ==
Chart performance for Getting Killed
Chart (2025–2026)	Peak position
Australian Albums (ARIA)	22
Belgian Albums (Ultratop Flanders)	52
Croatian International Albums (HDU)	28
Dutch Vinyl Albums (Dutch Charts)	32
French Rock & Metal Albums (SNEP)	24
Irish Albums (Official Charts)	23
Irish Independent Albums (IRMA)	10
Japanese Rock Albums (Oricon)	10
Japanese Western Albums (Oricon)	10
Japanese Top Albums Sales (Billboard Japan)	67
New Zealand Albums (RMNZ)	25
Portuguese Streaming Albums (AFP)	185
Scottish Albums (Official Charts)	6
UK Albums (Official Charts)	26
UK Independent Albums (Official Charts)	1
US Billboard 200	96
US Independent Albums (Billboard)	14
US Top Rock & Alternative Albums (Billboard)	21

== Certifications ==
Certifications for Getting Killed
Region	Certification	Certified units/sales
United Kingdom (BPI)	Silver	60,000^{‡}
^{‡} Sales+streaming figures based on certification alone.
