= 3D Country =

Studio album by Geese
- Released: June 23, 2023
- Recorded: The Diamond Mine (Queens); Future Sounds
- Genres: Art rock; indie rock; alternative country; blues rock; post-punk
- Length: 43:27
- Labels: Partisan; PIAS
- Producer: James Ford

Geese chronology
Projector (2021)	3D Country (2023)	4D Country (2023)

Geese studio albums chronology
Projector (2021)	3D Country (2023)	Getting Killed (2025)

Singles from 3D Country
- 1. "Cowboy Nudes" Released: January 31, 2023; 2. "3D Country" Released: March 21, 2023; 3. "Mysterious Love" Released: May 9, 2023; 4. "I See Myself" Released: June 20, 2023

3D Country is the third (Note: While this album is advertised by Geese as their second, and is their second under a record label, it is technically their third studio album counting their since-removed 2018 debut album A Beautiful Memory.) studio album by American indie rock band Geese, released on June 23, 2023, through Partisan Records and Play It Again Sam. Produced by James Ford, the album was preceded by the singles "Cowboy Nudes", "Mysterious Love", "3D Country", and "I See Myself", and received favorable reviews from critics.

It is the band's final album to feature guitarist Foster Hudson, who departed from the band in December 2023 to focus on his academic studies. A follow-up EP, 4D Country, was released in October 2023 featuring four additional tracks from the album's recording sessions.

== Background ==
The album is centered on "the story of an uptight cowboy as he wanders through the desert after taking psychedelic drugs, watching the world around him – and his concept of the self – unravel in the process". The lyrics cover themes of love, despair and the apocalypse.

== Critical reception ==
Professional ratings
Aggregate scores
Source	Rating
Metacritic	78/100
Review scores
Source	Rating
Beats Per Minute	75%
DIY	4/5 stars
The Line of Best Fit	6/10
Paste	8.8/10
Pitchfork	6.8/10

The music of 3D Country has been described as art rock, indie rock, alternative country, blues rock, and post punk.

3D Country received a score of 78 out of 100 on review aggregator Metacritic based on six critics' reviews, indicating "generally favorable" reception.

Reviewing the album for Rolling Stone, Ian Blau wrote that "for the most part, every detour they take leads somewhere interesting" and that the band have "delivered one of the better New York rock albums of the past few years, taking hand-me-down sounds and twisting them in ways only they could imagine". The album landed at 35 on Rolling Stone's list of the 40 best indie-rock albums of 2023.

Will Yarbrough of The Line of Best Fit remarked that "Geese do everything they can to avoid comparison, venturing into cosmic country, electro-funk and apocalyptic boogaloo with reckless abandon. There's never a dull moment." DIY's James Hickey found that Geese have "abandoned their previous sonic palette in pursuit of pure experimentation" and while "there are traces of the discordant post-punk they are known for, [...] this time [it is] far removed from any cliche of the modern genre". Brady Gerber of Pitchfork opined that there is "a newfound emphasis on dynamics and space" and Geese "evolves from its gritty post-punk origins into a proudly outrageous jam band". Gerber concluded that while "their influences are all over the map, it's encouraging to hear Geese getting more comfortable sounding like themselves".

Tilly Foulkes of NME described the album as "a cynical take on Americana in the age of an imminent climate crisis – one that proves Geese to be a genuine tour-de-force". Matt Mitchell of Paste called it "at once theatrical, vicious, heartfelt and daring", "a brilliant, miraculous assemblage of stone cold rock 'n' roll" as well as an "ambitious, intricate and far-ranging LP of seismic proportions". Tim Sentz of Beats Per Minute pointed out 3D Country's "unpredictability and oddball choices", writing that the band "experiment with the formula admirably, testing their genre-bending capabilities throughout but always furnishing each deviation with warm harmonies", and summarizing it as "a fun album, and it gives the band a more definable personality – even if it's bonkers".

== Track listing ==
3D Country track listing
No.	Title	Length
1.	"2122"	3:52
2.	"3D Country"	5:13
3.	"Cowboy Nudes"	2:50
4.	"I See Myself"	3:00
5.	"Undoer"	6:59
6.	"Crusades"	2:38
7.	"Gravity Blues"	4:01
8.	"Mysterious Love"	3:15
9.	"Domoto"	3:48
10.	"Tomorrow's Crusades"	4:31
11.	"St. Elmo"	3:20
Total length:		43:27

== Personnel ==
Credits adapted from the album's liner notes.

=== Geese ===
- Cameron Winter – vocals, piano; bass (track 11), design
- Emily Green (Note: Credited in initial releases under her deadname.) – guitar
- Foster Hudson – guitar (tracks 1–10), screams (track 5), vocals (track 8), percussion (track 11), record sleeve poem
- Dom DiGesu – bass (tracks 1–10), drums (track 11)
- Max Bassin – drums (tracks 1–10)

=== Additional personnel ===
- Audrey Martells – backing vocals (tracks 2–4, 7, 11)
- Lajuan Carter – backing vocals (tracks 2, 7, 11)
- Jenny Douglas – backing vocals (tracks 3, 4)
- Katie Jacoby – viola (tracks 2, 6, 9–11)
- Tomoko Akaboshi – violin (tracks 2, 6, 9–11)
- Alon Bisk – cello (tracks 2, 6, 9–11)
- Sam Revaz – additional piano (tracks 2, 5)
- Roope Rainisto – design
- Andy Swartz – photography

=== Technical ===
- Geese – production
- James Ford – production, mixing, recording (tracks 1, 2, 5-11), guitar (track 11)
- Beatriz Artola – mixing, recording (tracks 3, 4)
- Matthew Colton – mastering
- Lily Wen – recording (tracks 1, 2, 5-11)
- Loren Humphrey – recording (tracks 1, 2, 5-11)

== Charts ==
Chart performance for 3D Country
Chart (2023–2026)	Peak position
Croatian International Albums (HDU)	18
Scottish Albums (Official Charts)	77
UK Independent Albums (Official Charts)	30
UK Record Store (OCC)	19
