= Emily Green (musician) =

American musician (born 2002)

- Green performing with Geese in 2026
- Born: April 6, 2002 (age 24); New York City, U.S.
- Occupations: Musician; singer; model
- Years active: 2016–present
- Musical career
- Genres: Art rock; indie rock; experimental rock
- Instruments: Guitar; vocals
- Labels: Partisan Records; PIAS
- Member of: Geese; Star's Revenge

Emily Green (born April 6, 2002) is an American musician and songwriter known for being the lead guitarist of the rock band Geese. She co-founded the band with Dominic DiGesu, Max Bassin, and Cameron Winter.

Alongside her work with Geese, Green has been involved as the vocalist and guitarist for the band Star's Revenge that she created with Sunflower Bean drummer Olive Faber. She has also worked as a session musician for other artists including Lex Walton, as well as members of Tame Impala and King Gizzard & the Lizard Wizard.

== Early life ==
Emily Green was born on April 6, 2002, and raised in the Park Slope neighborhood of Brooklyn. Her father, Andy Green, is a composer and sound designer, and was a long-time touring musician and collaborator with the Welsh composer John Cale. He was the impetus for her beginning to play the guitar, encouraging her to learn the instrument and giving her second-hand music gear. She regarded her experience playing the guitar as being "pretty bad at it for a long time".

Before Geese was signed by a record label, the band planned on breaking up and attending college after graduating high school. Green sought to enroll in Oberlin College for a degree in studio art. She later attended classes at Columbia University during an inactive period for the band after recording 3D Country.

== Career ==
=== Geese (2016–present) ===
Green met the members of Geese in early childhood. She became friends with frontman Cameron Winter and drummer Max Bassin while at Brooklyn Friends School. Upon starting high school, she transferred to the Little Red School House where she would meet bassist Dominic DiGesu at a first-year orientation field trip. In 2012, she joined the Park Slope Rock School music program where she would regularly perform with Winter and Bassin. The three formed Geese in 2016 after inviting DiGesu to be their bass player. Another Little Red School House student that Green had studied with, Foster Hudson, would later join the band as second guitarist. The band's name is derived from Green's childhood nickname, "Goose".

Geese began to practice weekly at Bassin's basement after school, with equipment handed to them by their parents. After releasing a couple of EPs and their debut album A Beautiful Memory in 2018, the band intended to break up to attend college. However, in 2020, Geese was scouted by manager Willie Upbin, who gave them record offers from labels such as 4AD and Sub Pop. They eventually signed to Partisan Records. Geese would get critical acclaim with their albums Projector, 3D Country, and Getting Killed.

=== Star's Revenge (2023–present) ===
Green met Olive Faber at South by Southwest in 2022, where both Geese and Faber's band Sunflower Bean were performing, and quickly became friends. Their friendship would grow into a musical project after both Green and Faber left a party and talked about starting a band. The two came together to form Star's Revenge after weekly recording sessions elaborating on previous material and forgoing boundaries set by their respective bands. Green regards the band's sound as "capital-R Rock music". Star's Revenge released a self-titled album in 2024, with production credits split in half between Green and Faber.

On November 5, 2026, the band released their song "Don't Worry Dynamite" as the lead single to their sophomore album Star's Revenge II. The album was recorded in Long Island and will be set to release on November 27.

== Artistry ==
=== Musical style ===
Geese's music has been described as art rock, indie rock, and post-punk. Green's guitar playing is portrayed as switching between "uncontrollable shredding and steady command" with much experimentation with her instrument. Rolling Stone's Jaeden Pinder has also summarized her guitar playing as meticulous and layered with a minimalist flourish. When describing her musical chemistry with former Geese guitarist Foster Hudson, Green commented on the two having “good guitar interplay and driving rhythm instrumentals with some nice abstract melodies on top.”

Green has played a variety of guitar equipment, using guitars, pedals, and amps from several brands and models. However, a mainstay has been the Reverend Double Agent: she says she found the guitar for sale and appreciated its sound and that it "cost about $500 less than a Fender would". During live shows, Green also uses a Boss DD-5 digital delay pedal, which she likes for its reliable performance, long delay times, and the "glitchy" time dilation effect. Other gear that Green uses is the Stratotone Newport Model H 42/2 guitar by Silvertone, as well as a Music Man 112 RD amplifier, a Pearl Parametric EQ pedal, a Boss Blues Driver, and a Z.Vex Fuzz Factory. She regards gaining experience performing live with others as the best and most interesting method of playing guitar as opposed to music theory or dedicated practice sessions, citing her experiences playing with Winter and Bassin.

=== Influences ===
Green attributes the album Marquee Moon by New York band Television as a huge influence, singling out the guitar work of frontman Tom Verlaine. British band Radiohead were also reportedly influential to Green's guitar playing early on with their use of various guitar pedals. Pinder has additionally credited Verlaine and Radiohead as the main factors in her "lithe and spry" and "woozy" playing. She also called Snowflakes Are Dancing by Japanese musician Isao Tomita one of her favorite albums, because "the album functions as a place that I believe I'll always wanna return to".

== Personal life ==
Green is a trans woman. She has spoken about feeling as if she was "born in the wrong body" at age 12, and that her decision to transition coincided with the promotion for Projector in 2021. Green first went by they/them pronouns in her career as a springboard for a later female transition. She officially came out as a trans woman via the cover of Geese's Alive & In Person live album in 2024, where she was credited as Emily. She has credited Star's Revenge and her collaborations with bandmate Olive Faber as an avenue for her to express her femininity.

== Other ventures ==
Green has done runway modeling. She debuted on the Paris Fashion Week runway for the Givenchy Fall 2026 Ready-to-Wear Show at the Château de Vincennes.

== Discography ==
Geese

- A Beautiful Memory (2018)
- Projector (2021)
- 3D Country (2023)
- Getting Killed (2025)

Star's Revenge

- star's revenge (2024)
- Star's Revenge II (2026)
