= Cameron Winter =

American musician (born 2002)

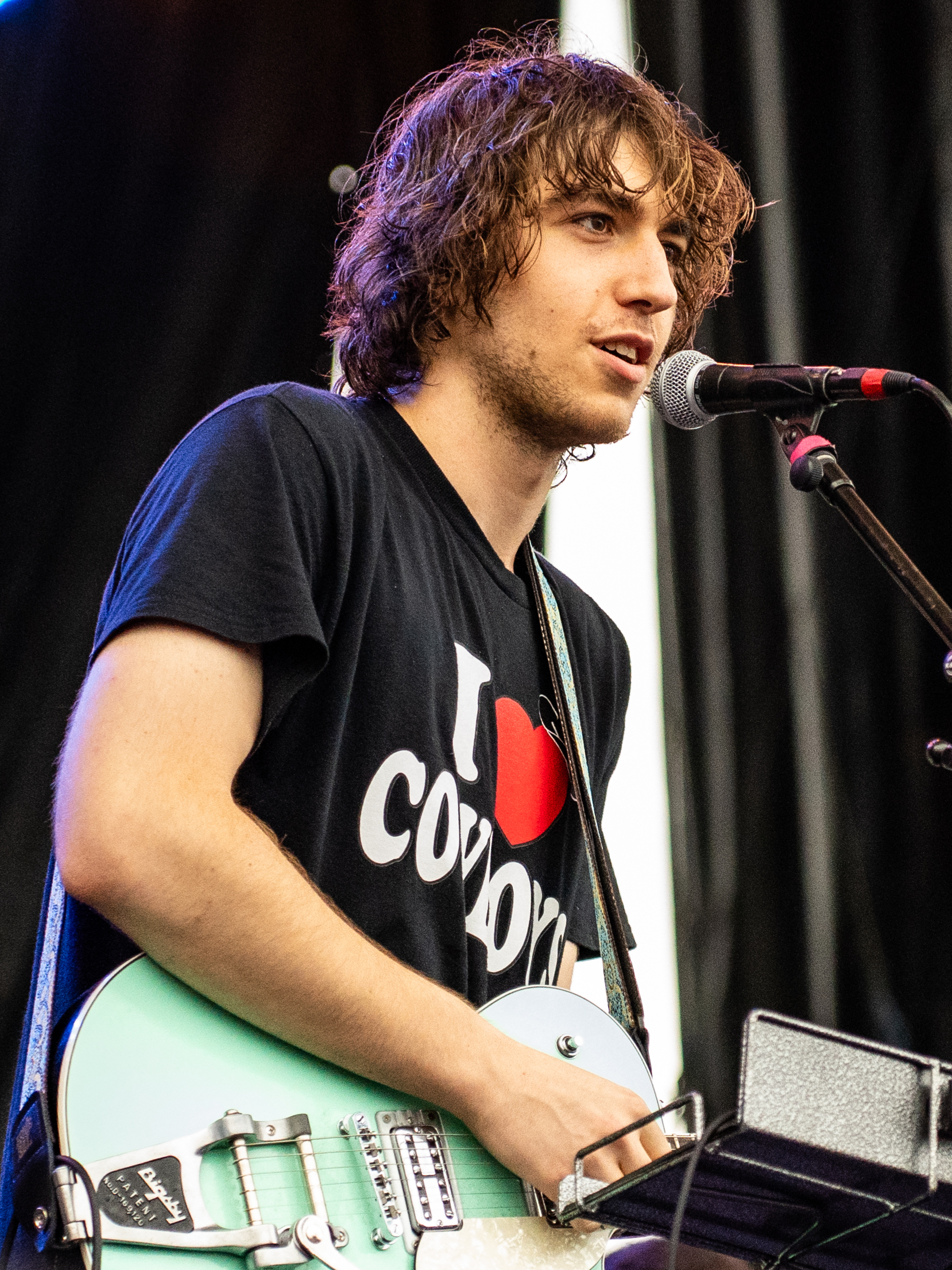
- Winter performing in 2024

Background information
- Also known as: Chet Chomsky; Son-John Johnson
- Born: March 4, 2002 (age 24); New York City, U.S.
- Genres: Folk; indie rock; art rock; indie folk; folk rock
- Occupations: Singer; songwriter; musician
- Instruments: Vocals; keyboards; guitar
- Labels: Partisan; PIAS
- Member of: Geese; Men of the Reef
- Website: mrcameronwinter.com

Cameron Winter (born March 4, 2002) is an American musician who serves as the frontman, lead vocalist and principal songwriter for the rock band Geese, with which he has released four studio albums and three EPs since their founding in 2016. He is also known for his solo work; his debut solo album, Heavy Metal, was released in 2024.

== Early life ==
Winter grew up in Park Slope, Brooklyn, attending the Brooklyn Friends School. His mother, Molly Roden Winter, is a writer, and his father, Stewart Winter, is a composer and co-owner of a production music company; both are Jewish.

In his adolescence, he played youth ice hockey, but had to give it up due to concussions, after which he turned to music. In high school, he formed a band, Geese, with friends from school. After high school, he applied to Boston University with the intention of pursuing a degree in communications but ultimately chose to forgo college and pursue music as a career, along with his Geese bandmates, after signing with Partisan Records in 2020.

== Career ==
=== Geese ===
Formed in 2016 with Winter as their vocalist, keyboardist, and main songwriter, Geese has released four studio albums: A Beautiful Memory (2018), Projector (2021), 3D Country (2023), and Getting Killed (2025).

=== Solo work ===
When he was 12 years old, Winter entered the National Math Museum's 'Pi Day Song Contest' and won. After winning, his father, Stewart, uploaded the song onto Soundcloud where it can still be found.

Winter made his official solo debut in October of 2024 with two songs, "Vines" and "Take It With You", paired in a release titled Singles. On December 6, 2024, he released his debut solo album, Heavy Metal, to widespread critical acclaim. It was named one of the best debut albums of 2024 by Paste and an early entry for one of the best albums of 2025 by several publications, given its late 2024 release. Pitchfork would go on to name Heavy Metal the third best album of 2025 and its third song "Love Takes Miles" the best song of 2025. Lizzy Goodman summarized in The New York Times that Heavy Metal was "received as a tour de force ... But it has also turned Mr. Winter into the kind of artist that has fans analyzing every detail of his impressionistic lyrics and telling him his work has kept them from suicide. In other words, [it] has received the kind of response that a record earns when the artist who made it is on their way to a certain kind of highly personal stardom." Along with the release of "Heavy Metal" there was a limited edition bonus vinyl 7 inch release with two live tracks Try As I May (Live At St. John's Lutheran Church) and The Rolling Stones (Live At St. John's Lutheran Church) it was limited to 1,014 copies.

On his first solo tour, Winter became one of the youngest artists ever to headline a concert at Carnegie Hall. The concert was filmed by Paul Thomas Anderson with help from Benny Safdie. The film will have a tour of theatrical releases starting in November 2026. NME's Andrew Trendell reviewed the London leg of the tour, awarding Winter's Roundhouse show a full five stars and saying that he "has the power, talent and magnetism of a future great – a star to go the distance with just that voice, a piano and a whole world quite literally at his fingertips." On January 19, 2026 Winter played a secret charity show under the name "Chet Chomsky" at Queens venue TV Eye to provide help to families from Gaza.

On April 16, 2026, a Wired article highlighted the connection between PR company Chaotic Good Projects and "alternative" acts, in particular Cameron Winter and Geese. The piece cited a Billboard interview with Chaotic Good co-founders Jesse Coren and Andrew Spelman about their "narrative campaigns". These campaigns include creating hundreds of fake social media accounts to post positively about affiliated artists in comment sections and manipulate algorithms on social media sites such as TikTok. Winter and Geese have also reportedly employed digital marketing agency Byword for narrative campaigns as well. In response to the publishing of this piece, Chaotic Good removed mention of Cameron Winter, Geese, and narrative campaigns from their website, though co-founder Adam Tarsia confirmed to Wired later that month that they did engineer campaigns for both Cameron Winter and Geese.

Semley's article has been the source of debate, with some writers arguing that Winter's collaboration with Chaotic Good Projects isn't significant considering the breadth of popular artists that use the same kind of algorithmic manipulation described in Chaotic Good Projects' narrative campaigns.

=== Men of the Reef ===
Winter is also involved in the project Men of the Reef. He and Oliver Seda recorded an EP called Elephant Hunter that was released on September 6, 2019.

== Artistry ==
Cameron Winter has been described as an American folk prodigy, an "aspiring Brooklyn indie rock artist", the frontman of an art rock band, a modern indie folk artist, and Alli Dempsey of Paste noted that "Winter wants us to be in on the cosmic joke that guides his life, and informs his enlightening folk rock and pragmatic, anxious songwriting."

Winter cites Leonard Cohen and Bob Dylan as the primary influences on his solo material. Critics have drawn further comparisons between Winter and the likes of Tom Waits, Stephen Malkmus, Jeff Mangum, Bill Callahan and Lou Reed.

Winter's voice has been praised for its range and versatility. Describing Winter's vocals on Projector, Jon Dolan of Rolling Stone said that Winter "can hoist his voice into a Thom Yorke-an falsetto, put on a posh pout à la Julian Casablancas or Ian McCulloch of Echo and the Bunnymen, or lapse into a stentorian yawp that brings to mind Mark E. Smith of the Fall or Arctic Monkeys' Alex Turner." Ian Blau of Rolling Stone said that Winter "shines throughout [3D Country]", where he "contorts his voice to fit any set of lyrics or musical style." When it comes to Winter's vocals on Heavy Metal, Walden Green of Pitchfork characterizes his voice as a "woozy baritone", a "versatile and tender instrument ... immediately remarkable for its sheer range and depth of tone." Fellow musician Nick Cave lauded his voice on Heavy Metal as "glorious" and "emotive".

Described as "a songwriter par excellence" by Walden Green of Pitchfork, Winter's lyrics have been noted for both their cathartic and surreal qualities. Cave described his lyrics on Heavy Metal as "brilliant" and "blistering".

== Discography ==
=== Studio albums ===
Title	Details
Heavy Metal	Released: December 6, 2024; Label: Partisan, Play It Again Sam; Format: LP, CD, digital download, streaming

=== Live albums ===
Title	Details	Peak chart positions				
Title	Details	US	AUS	IRE	NZ	UK
Live at Carnegie Hall	Released: October 9, 2026; Label: Partisan, Play It Again Sam; Format: LP, CD, digital download, streaming	50	8	25	39	20

=== Collaborative albums ===
Title	Details
Help(2)	Released: March 6, 2026; Label: War Child Records; Format: LP, CD, digital download, streaming

=== Extended plays ===
Title	Details
Singles	Released: October 22, 2024; Label: Partisan, Play It Again Sam; Format: Digital download, streaming

=== Singles ===
Title	Year	Album
"$0"	2024	Heavy Metal

=== Digital-exclusive releases ===
Title	Year	Format	Platform
"LSD"	2025	digital download	Winter's website

=== Music videos ===
Song	Year	Director
"$0"	2024	Andy Swartz
"Drinking Age"	2024	Andy Swartz
"Love Takes Miles"	2024	Andy Swartz
"The Rolling Stones"	2024	Andy Swartz
"Love Takes Miles" (version 2)	2025	Celia Rowlson-Hall

=== Men of the Reef ===
Title	Details
Elephant Hunter	Released: September 6, 2019; Label: self-released; Format: digital download, streaming

=== Guest appearances ===
Song	Year	Other artists	Album	Notes
"Kill Me"	2026	Phoebe Bridgers	Lost Weekend	Credited under pseudonym "Son-John Johnson"
"I Can't Wait"	2026	Phoebe Bridgers	Lost Weekend	Credited under pseudonym "Son-John Johnson"
