= All Things Go Music Festival =

Annual music festival in Washington, D.C., US

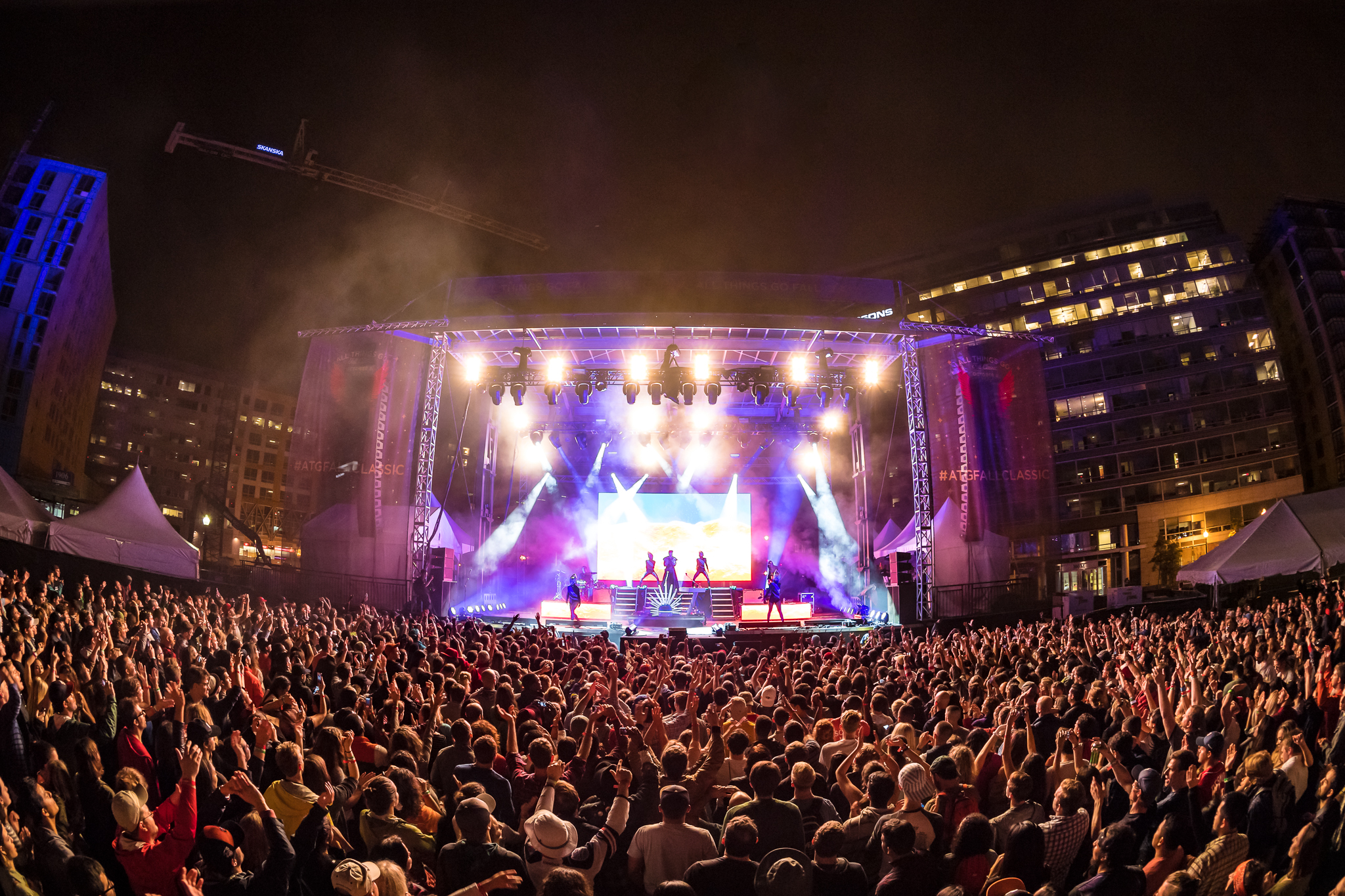
- 2016 All Things Go Fall Classic
- Genre: Rock, pop, indie, hip hop, electronic dance music
- Locations: Union Market (2014–2015, 2019); Yards Park (2016–2018); Merriweather Post Pavilion (2021–present); Forest Hills Stadium (NYC, 2024–present); Budweiser Stage (Toronto, 2025–present)
- Years active: 2014–present
- Founders: Adrian Maseda, Will Suter, Zack Friendly, and Stephen Vallimarescu
- Organizer: All Things Go
- Website: www.allthingsgofestival.com

The All Things Go Music Festival is an outdoor music festival held in Columbia, Maryland, a suburb of Baltimore and Washington, D.C. The festival was founded in 2014 as the All Things Go Fall Classic and is produced by the company All Things Go. The festival and company take their name from the Sufjan Stevens song "Chicago."

The festival was first held at the Union Market in Washington, D.C, expanding to the 15,000 capacity Yards Park in 2016. The festival moved to Columbia in 2021, and has since been held at the 20,000 capacity Merriweather Post Pavilion. The festival is cited for its support and inclusion of LGBT artists, and women-focused lineups. In 2024, the inaugural All Things Go New York City took place in Forest Hills Stadium, the same weekend as the Columbia edition. A third festival has been held in Toronto since 2025.

Its 2018 edition featured an all-women lineup, curated by Maggie Rogers and Lizzy Plapinger and headlined by Maggie Rogers, Billie Eilish, and Carly Rae Jepsen. Plapinger commented on how the festival was an opportunity to improve the gender imbalance. The Women's March partnered with the event and facilitated a discussion around gender inequality. In 2019, the All Things Go Fall Classic dedicated a day of the festival to female performers. The female-focused nonprofit, She is the Music, was a supporting partner.

== Lineups ==
=== 2014 ===
Saturday, September 13
- Future Islands
- Tove Lo
- Haerts
- Bear Hands
- Panama Wedding
- U.S. Royalty
- Sun Club
- Young Summer

=== 2015 ===
Saturday, October 10
- Kygo
- The Knocks
- Penguin Prison
- Baio
- Powers
- Tigertown
- Chelsea Lankes
- The Walking Sticks
- Niykee Heaton

=== 2016 ===
Saturday, October 8
- Empire of the Sun
- Passion Pit
- Sylvan Esso
- Christine and the Queens
- Bishop Briggs
- Pop Etc
- Sofi Tukker
- Ace Cosgrove

=== 2017 ===
Lineup
Friday, October 6	Saturday, October 7	Sunday, October 8
Galantis; The Knocks; JackLndn; Bearson; Win and Woo	Young Thug; Vince Staples; Cashmere Cat; Saba; Kweku Collins; Jay IDK; Innanet James; April + Vista	Foster the People; Bleachers; Betty Who; Foreign Air; Now, Now; Fletcher; Great Good Fine Ok; Young Futura

=== 2018 ===
Lineup (Note: Børns was slated to headline on October 7th, however he was dropped from the lineup following allegations of sexual misconduct.)
Saturday, October 6	Sunday, October 7
Maggie Rogers; Billie Eilish; Jessie Reyez; Ravyn Lenae; LPX; Alma; Oshun; Kaye	Carly Rae Jepsen; Betty Who; Two Feet; The Aces; Cautious Clay; Snny; FootsXColes

=== 2019 ===
Lineup
Saturday, October 12	Sunday, October 13
Chvrches; LANY; Coin; Muna; Mxmtoon; Nasty Cherry; Arkells; Sneaks	Melanie Martinez; Betty Who; Léon; Olivia O'Brien; Allie X; Carlie Hanson; TeaMarrr; Shenna

=== 2021 ===
Saturday, October 16
Pavilion Stage	Chrysalis Stage
Haim; St. Vincent; Girl in Red; Beach Bunny; Soccer Mommy; Tai Verdes; Tkay Maidza; Jelani Aryeh	Charli XCX; Lauv; Cautious Clay; Gus Dapperton; Role Model; Blu DeTiger; Del Water Gap; Isaac Dunbar

=== 2022 ===
Saturday, October 1
Pavilion Stage	Chrysalis Stage
Lorde; Mitski; Lucy Dacus; Faye Webster; Maude Latour; Bartees Strange; Michelle; Kyle Dion	Bleachers; King Princess; Hippo Campus; Peach Pit; Goth Babe; Jack Kays; Wallice; The Blssm

=== 2023 ===
Saturday, September 30
Pavilion Stage	Chrysalis Stage
Maggie Rogers; Carly Rae Jepsen; Fletcher; Tegan and Sara; Suki Waterhouse; Raye; Last Dinosaurs; Jensen McRae	Mt. Joy; Lizzy McAlpine; Dayglow; Peach Pit; The Wombats; Sudan Archives; Vacations; Hemlocke Springs
Sunday, October 1
Lana Del Rey; Boygenius; Arlo Parks; Ethel Cain; Leith Ross; Ella Jane; Tommy Lefroy; Free Range	Muna; Alex G; Alvvays; Samia; No Vacation; Meet Me at the Altar; Vundabar; Juliana Madrid

=== 2024 ===
==== Columbia ====
Saturday, September 28
- Laufey with the Kennedy Center Orchestra
- Bleachers
- Janelle Monáe
- Remi Wolf
- Ethel Cain
- Julien Baker
- Michael Kiwanuka
- Maisie Peters
- Briston Maroney
- Sammy Rae & The Friends
- Mannequin Pussy
- Indigo de Souza
- Grentperez
- Wasia Project
- Annie DiRusso
- Infinity Song (Note: Rachel Chinouriri was slated to perform at the festival but cancelled due to financial constraints. She was replaced by Infinity Song, who were originally scheduled to perform on Sunday, September 29.)
- August Ponthier
- Oliver Malcolm
Sunday, September 29
- Hozier
- Reneé Rapp
- Conan Gray
- Maren Morris
- Muna (Note: Chappell Roan was slated to perform but cancelled due to mental health reasons. She was replaced by Muna, who had headlined the previous day in New York.)
- The Japanese House
- Holly Humberstone
- David Kushner
- Del Water Gap
- Flipturn
- Soccer Mommy
- Medium Build
- Blondshell
- Lola Young
- Towa Bird
- Sadurn
- Abby Roberts

==== New York City ====
Saturday, September 28
- Reneé Rapp
- Muna
- Holly Humberstone
- Del Water Gap
- Soccer Mommy
- Coco & Clair Clair
- Towa Bird
Sunday, September 29
- Janelle Monáe
- Ethel Cain
- Julien Baker
- Maisie Peters
- Samia
- Mannequin Pussy
- Indigo de Souza
- Annie DiRusso

=== 2025 ===
==== Columbia ====
Friday, September 26
- Noah Kahan
- The Marías
- The Last Dinner Party
- Sharon Van Etten & The Attachment Theory
- Lucius
- The Beaches
- Joy Oladokun
- Sunday (1994)
- Caroline Kingsbury
Saturday, September 27
- Lucy Dacus
- Clairo
- Faye Webster
- Wallows
- The Backseat Lovers
- Hippo Campus
- Wild Rivers (Note: Julien Baker & Torres were slated to perform but cancelled their tour due to health reasons. They were replaced by Wild Rivers.)
- Gigi Perez
- Paris Paloma
- Orion Sun
- G Flip
- Bartees Strange
- Hey, Nothing
- Hazlett
- Zinadelphia
- Carol Ades
Sunday, September 28
- Doechii
- Kesha
- Djo
- Lola Young
- Role Model
- Marina
- Rachel Chinouriri
- Ashe
- Griff
- Maude Latour
- The Aces
- Michelle
- Peach PRC
- Alemeda
- Molly Grace
- Jasmine.4.T

==== New York City ====
Friday, September 26
- Lucy Dacus
- Djo
- Gigi Perez
- Rachel Chinouriri
- Maude Latour
- The Aces
- Sarah Kinsley
- Goldie Boutilier
Saturday, September 27
- Doechii
- Remi Wolf
- Lola Young
- Griff
- Peach PRC
- Michelle
- Alemeda
- Sunday (1994)
Sunday, September 28
- Clairo
- The Marías
- The Last Dinner Party
- Paris Paloma
- Blondshell
- G Flip
- Joy Oladokun
- Hey, Nothing

==== Toronto ====
Saturday, October 4
- Reneé Rapp
- Remi Wolf
- Ravyn Lenae
- Chelsea Cutler
- Blondshell
- Julia Wolf
- Elio
- Emei
Sunday, October 5
- Kacey Musgraves
- Role Model
- Charlotte Cardin
- Noah Cyrus
- Valley
- Joy Oladokun
- Alemeda
- Baby Nova

=== 2026 ===
==== Toronto ====
Saturday, June 6
- Kesha
- The Beaches
- Rachel Chinouriri
- Holly Humberstone
- Sofia Camara
- Bella Kay
Sunday, June 7
- Lorde
- Wet Leg
- Del Water Gap
- Jade LeMac
- Momma
- Flower Face

==== Columbia, MD ====
Friday, September 25
- Mitski
- Ethel Cain
- Rainbow Kitten Surprise
- Magdalena Bay
- Slayyyter
- Stella Lefty
- Ninajirachi
- Underscores
- Balu Brigada
- Robby Hoffman
- Rico Nasty
- Syml
Saturday, September 26
- Hayley Williams
- Muna
- Zara Larsson
- Suki Waterhouse
- Del Water Gap
- She & Him
- The Beaches
- The Beths
- Rebecca Black
- Naika
- Hemlocke Springs
- Haute & Freddy
- Grace Ives
- Zolita
- Love Spells
- Susannah Joffe
- Glom
- Kevin Atwater
Sunday, September 27
- Brandi Carlile
- Lola Young
- Remi Wolf
- Father John Misty
- Sierra Ferell
- Tinashe
- Flipturn
- Wolf Alice
- CMAT
- Jensen McRae
- Ryan Beatty
- Rochelle Jordan
- Trousdale
- Tiny Habits
- Violet Grohl
- Natalie Jinju
- Googly Eyes
- Jake Minch
- Wes Parker

==== New York City ====
This event was cancelled due to a nor'easter hitting the New York City metropolitan area.

Friday, September 25
- Zara Larsson
- Lola Young
- Rebecca Black
- Cara Delevingne
- Blu DeTiger
- Chloe Qisha
Saturday, September 26
- Brandi Carlile
- Ethel Cain
- CMAT
- Jensen McRae
- Meg Stalter
- Natalie Jinju
Sunday, September 27
- Muna
- Carly Rae Jepsen
- The Beaches
- Hemlocke Springs
- Grace Ives
- Cherry Bomb
