= Kevin Atwater =

Kevin Atwater may refer to:

- Kevin Atwater (singer)
- Kevin Atwater (Chicago P.D.)
