= Setting Fires =

Setting Fires may refer to:

- Setting Fires, a collaboration project by Mat Devine and Alain Whyte
- "Setting Fires" (song), a 2016 single by The Chainsmokers
