= Urban Investment Partners =

American real estate company

- Type: Privately held company
- Industry: Real estate
- Founded: 1999; 27 years ago
- Founder: Steve Schwat; Wout Couster
- Headquarters: Washington, D.C.
- Key people: Steve Schwat, Principal; Peter Bonnell, Principal
- Website: www.urbaninvestmentpartners.com

Urban Investment Partners (UIP) is company that develops apartments in Washington D.C. The company was founded in 1999 by Steve Schwat and Wout Couster. In 2019 and 2020, tenants of a building owned by Urban Investment Partners launched a rent strike to protest mold, lead, poor maintenance, and other problems with the building. The company initiated eviction proceedings against the non-paying tenants.

Perdomo National Wrecking Company sued the company in 2018 for $221,000, alleging that Urban did not make "timely and complete payments" for work performed. In January, 2020, Edge Commercial sued Urban Investment Partners for breach of contract. As of May, 2020, the company had not issued rent relief to tenants affected by the COVID-19 pandemic.

In 2023, the assistant manager at UIP-managed property in Adams Morgan pepper sprayed a resident. The confrontation, which was caught on video, started when a resident asked the employee about flyers calling for a tenant's association that had been taken down. UIP released a statement apologizing for the incident and claiming that it was sincere in its efforts to restore water service to the building.

== History ==
Urban Investment Partners originally specialized in acquiring and renovating brick buildings subject to rent control.

=== Projects ===
The company developed or invested in the following properties:

- Hall on Virginia Avenue in Foggy Bottom
- 3 buildings near American University in Tenleytown
- The TRIBECA in NoMa
- Policy, a 62-unit apartment community in Kalorama.
- Onyx on First in the Capitol Riverfront business improvement district
- 3333 Wisconsin Ave NW in Cleveland Park
- 1483 Newton St NW in Columbia Heights
- Frequency Apartments in Tenleytown
