= Haute and Freddy =

American alternative pop duo

- Origin: Los Angeles, California
- Genres: Alternative pop; synth-pop; electropop; new wave
- Years active: 2024–present
- Label: Atlantic
- Members: Michelle Buzz; Lance Shipp
- Website: hauteandfreddy.com

Haute and Freddy are an American alternative pop duo based in Los Angeles consisting of vocalist Michelle Buzz ("Haute") and percussionist/drummer Lance Shipp ("Freddy").

== History ==
Members Michelle Buzz, originally from Houston, Texas, and Lance Shipp, originally from Detroit, Michigan, each moved to Los Angeles to work as pop songwriters. Shipp co-wrote and produced for artists including Rauw Alejandro, Britney Spears, and Calvin Harris, while Buzz wrote hit songs for Katy Perry ("Never Really Over") and Kylie Minogue ("Magic") as well as albums for Bebe Rexha. Meeting through these circles, Buzz and Shipp, feeling burnt out with their usual pop songwriting work, began spending weekends working on music together. After two years of developing the project, they debuted as Haute and Freddy in late 2024 with the singles "Scantily Clad" and "Anti-Superstar", the former premiered via Paper.

On Valentine's Day 2025, Haute and Freddy performed at El Cid in Los Angeles with Hayley Kiyoko in the audience. Over the course of the year, the duo toured North America, playing venues including the Troubadour, the Bowery Ballroom, and The Slipper Room, and at festivals including Electric Forest, Austin City Limits Music Festival, Treefort Music Fest, and Portola Music Festival. They also continued to release singles during the year, including "Shy Girl" (whose music video was premiered by V magazine), "Sophie", and "Freaks".

In January 2026, it was announced Haute and Freddy had signed to Atlantic Records, with a debut album, Big Disgrace, to be released on March 13. This was accompanied by a single and music video, "Dance the Pain Away". Consequence listed the song among the best of the week.

== Career ==
Haute and Freddy serve as the musical identity and backbone of the score of the television series Carrie, which premiered on Prime Video in October 2026. The show's creator and writer, Mike Flanagan, even rewrote episode 8 around their unreleased demo of the song "Shy Girl". Nearly their entire 2026 album "Big Disgrace" is used all over the series. The main character, Carrie, wears their t-shirt in episodes two and three; she admits she doesn't know what it is, and her teacher (Miss Desjardin) replies that they’re "a very cool band". The series also includes a new Haute and Freddy cover of Peter Gabriel's "In Your Eyes" used as diegetic prom music.

== Musical style ==
Haute and Freddy perform a 1980s-inspired style variously described as alternative pop, synth-pop, dance-pop, electropop, new wave, and glam pop. Their sound has been compared to Chappell Roan, Kate Bush, Soft Cell, The Last Dinner Party, Caroline Kingsbury, The Knocks and Dragonette, Goldfrapp, Eurythmics, Siouxsie and the Banshees, Ladyhawke, Madonna, and Prince.

The group is known for their self-described "18th century runaway carnie" aesthetic, using a theatrical blend of Medieval, Baroque, and Renaissance fashions and carnival/circus theming. The Haute and Freddy characters have a loose backstory of being misfit circus runaways who antagonize aristocrats, partly inspired by old circus flyers Buzz found. Their fanbase is nicknamed "the Royal Court", and their live shows have been said to feature vintage-style clowns, acrobatics, and stilt-walkers. This style has been compared to Sofia Coppola's film Marie Antoinette and to New Romantic artists such as Culture Club and Adam and the Ants.

=== Influences ===
Buzz and Shipp are musically inspired by '80s synthpop artists including Pet Shop Boys and New Order, as well as David Bowie, Kate Bush, Freddie Mercury, and Lady Gaga. Shipp grew up listening to The Carpenters and Luther Vandross. They originally bonded over a love of "theatrical music, The Phantom of the Opera, and obscure avant-garde choral pieces".

== Members ==
- Michelle Buzz – vocals, piano, keytar
- Lance Shipp – drums, percussion, keyboards and synthesizers

== Discography ==
=== Studio albums ===
List of albums, with selected chart positions
| Title | Album details | Peak chart positions |
| Title | Album details | UK Sales |
|---|---|---|
| Big Disgrace | Released: March 2026; Label: Atlantic | 92 |

=== Singles ===
List of singles, with selected chart positions
| Title | Year | Peak chart positions | | Album |
| Title | Year | EST Air. | UK Sales | Album |
|---|---|---|---|---|
| "Scantily Clad" | 2024 | — | — | Big Disgrace |
| "Anti-Superstar" | 2024 | — | — | Big Disgrace |
| "Fashion Over Function" | 2025 | — | — | Big Disgrace |
| "Shy Girl" | 2025 | — | — | Big Disgrace |
| "Sophie" | 2025 | — | — | Big Disgrace |
| "Freaks" | 2025 | — | — | Big Disgrace |
| "Dance the Pain Away" | 2026 | 67 | — | Big Disgrace |
| "Touch Touch" | 2026 | — | 62 | |
"—" denotes items which were not released in that country or failed to chart.
