= Molly Grace =

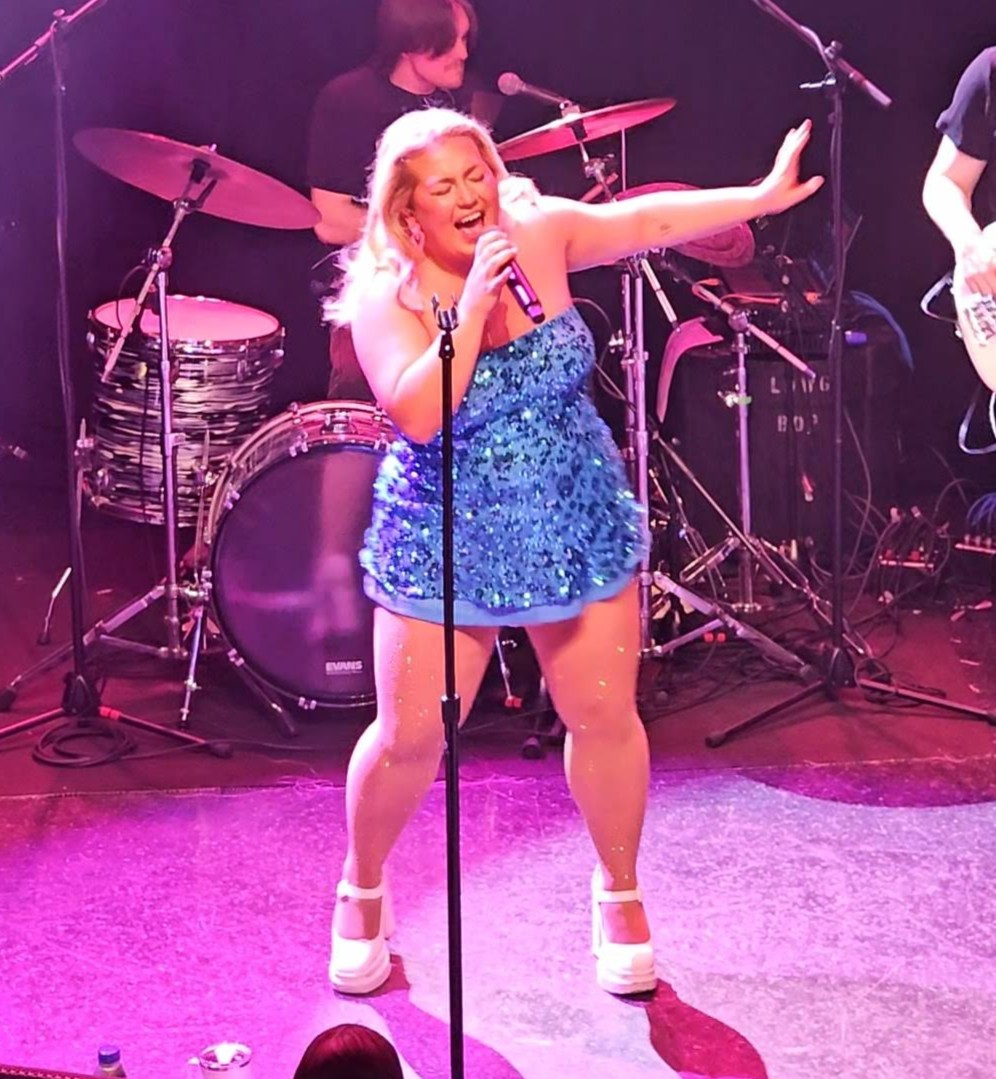
- Grace in 2025

Background information
- Born: Molly Grace Zeytoonian; December 6, 2001 (age 24); Florida, U.S.
- Origin: Nashville, Tennessee, U.S.
- Genres: Pop; funk; disco
- Occupation: singer-songwriter
- Instruments: Vocals; guitar
- Years active: 2021-present
- Label: Nettwerk Music Group

Molly Grace Zeytoonian (known by her stage name Molly Grace)(born December 6, 2001), is a queer independent American musician and singer-songwriter based out of Nashville. Grace has referenced artists such as Lizzo, Chappell Roan, Lawrence, Reneé Rapp, Remi Wolf, Taylor Swift and Freddie Mercury as influences in her music that blends pop, funk and disco.

== Career ==
=== 2021–2024: Debut EPs and Belmont Showcase Series ===
Grace released her first EP in 2021. Everybody Wants to Know Molly features the singles "Here I Am," "Love's Made a Fool of Me," and "Sunday Dinner." "What if I? (The Grocery Store Song)," is a lighthearted song that explores the concept of post-breakup self-acceptance while incorporating the names of common grocery stores like Whole Foods, Kroger, CVS, and Publix.

Throughout 2022, Grace released several more singles such as "Not the One," Woman's Intuition," "Sweet September," and "Ghostin'."

In May 2023, Grace released her single "Cancel my Plans," a piano-led queer love song with soul and pop influences. The next month, "Lady Lady," "Back in '08," and "Cancel my Plans" were released together. "Lady Lady," the titular single of these three explores themes of romantic attraction to women.

Grace embarked on her first headlining tour in February 2024 to promote her upcoming EP, Lovesick. The Lovesick Tour was scheduled for eight cities across the United States. This was Grace's first headlining tour, featuring other artists such as Marielle Kraft. Grace credited the ability of social media to promote her music for giving her the notoriety needed to headline a tour. As an up-and-coming artist, Grace had been left to promote her music through social media platforms such as TikTok and Instagram. Grace expressed frustration regarding this system in an interview with The Berkeley Beacon, while still recognizing its ability to provide new artists great exposure. She specifically noted how well social media algorithms promote her "upbeat" songs, but not acoustic songs and ballads.

Later that year, Grace released the live album The Lovesick Tour: Live (Side A) and featuring recordings of live performances on the tour in Boston and New York City.

In May 2024, Grace won the 2023-2024 Belmont Pop Showcase, a college-run music festival at Belmont University.

Grace's second EP, Lovesick, was released in November 2024 including the singles "Lover (Love Her)," If I Never Told You," and "Lovin' on You." This extended play was more heavily influenced by pop, funk, and soul than its predecessor, with Grace citing Earth, Wind and Fire, The Temptations, and Stevie Wonder as inspirations for songs.

=== 2025–present: New label and Blush ===
After signing to Nettwerk Music Group, Grace released "F.E.M.M.E." in January 2025 as a "femme lesbian anthem" based on personal experiences to highlight the struggles queer people face. That same month the But I'm a Pop Star Tour was announced on Instagram. Grace discussed her efforts involving social media by repeatedly posting videos. The chorus of "F.E.M.M.E." experienced moderate virality on TikTok. "Mad at Her Forever" was released in March 2025.

Grace's debut studio album, Blush, was released on September 25, 2025. Grace also performed at the All Things Go Music Festival in September 2025 as part of her Blush Tour.

== Personal life ==
Grace was born and raised in Lexington, Massachusetts, to parents of Armenian and Irish descent. Many members of Grace's family played music when she was growing up. Both of her grandfathers were in 1950s-era bands, while her great-uncle and aunt collaborated with Shakira.

By high school, Grace had already learned to play guitar and write songs. Following high school, Grace moved to Nashville, Tennessee and enrolled in Belmont University as a commercial voice major.

Grace has spoken about being a member of the LGBTQ community at concerts in the past. She performed at the 2025 Kentuckiana Pride Festival and shared she is a proud lesbian. Grace is an advocate for women's empowerment, body positivity, and LGBTQ rights.

== Discography ==
=== Studio album ===
Title	Details
Blush	September 26, 2025; Label: Nettwerk Music Group; Formats: Digital download, streaming, vinyl record

=== Live album ===
List of live albums, with selected details
Title	Details
The Lovesick Tour: Live (Side A)	July 26, 2024; Label: Independent; Formats: Digital download, streaming

=== EPs ===
List of extended plays, with selected details
Title	Details
Everybody Wants to Know Molly	Released October 22, 2021; Label: Independent; Formats: Digital download, streaming
Lovesick	Released November 17, 2023; Label: Independent; Formats: Digital download, streaming

=== Singles ===
==== As lead artist ====
List of singles as lead artist, showing year released
Title	Year	Album
"Here I Am"	2021	Everybody Wants to Know Molly
"Love's Made a Fool of Me"	2021	Everybody Wants to Know Molly
"Sunday Dinner"	2021	Everybody Wants to Know Molly
"Not the One"	2022	Non-album single
"Woman's Intuition"	2022	"Ghostin'"
"Sweet September"	2022	"Ghostin'"
"Ghostin'"	2022	"Ghostin'"
"All or Nothin'"	2023	Non-album singles
"Love you Better"	2023	Non-album singles
"Back in '08"	2023	"Love Lady"
"Cancel my Plans"	2023	"Love Lady"
"Love Lady"	2023	"Love Lady"
"Woe is Me"	2023	Non-album single
"Love is Her (Love Her)"	2023	Lovesick
"If I Never Told You"	2023	Lovesick
"Lovin' On You"	2023	Lovesick
"Little Bit of Hell (Live in New York)"	2024	The Lovesick Tour: Live (Side A)
"Red Line (Live in Boston)"	2024	The Lovesick Tour: Live (Side A)
"F.E.M.M.E."	2025	Blush
"Mad at Her Forever"	2025	Blush
"Do Me (Feels So Good)"	2025	Blush
"Heaven Sent"	2025	Blush
"Soprano"	2025	Blush
"WYKYK"	2025	Blush

==== As featured artist ====
List of singles as a featured artist, showing year released
Title	Year released	Album
"Girls Just Wanna Be Famous(er)" (Meg Smith, MARIS, and Molly Grace)	2025	Non-album single

=== Music videos ===
List of music videos, showing title, year released, and director(s)
Title	Year	Director(s)
"What if I? (The Grocery Store Song)"	2021	Penny Kapadoukakis
"Heaven Sent"	2025	TBD

== Tours ==
- The Lovesick Tour (2024)
- But I'm a Pop Star Tour (2025)
- Blush Tour (2025)
