= Tiger Eyes (EP) =

EP by Ryu Su-jeong
- Released: May 20, 2020
- Recorded: 2020
- Genre: K-pop; R&B
- Length: 22:54
- Language: Korean
- Label: Woollim; Kakao M
- Producer: Lee Jung-yeop (exec.)

Ryu Su-jeong chronology
Tiger Eyes (2020)	Archive of Emotions (2023)

Singles from Tiger Eyes
- 1. "Tiger Eyes" Released: May 20, 2020

Music video
- "Tiger Eyes" on YouTube

Tiger Eyes is the debut extended play (EP) by South Korean singer Ryu Su-jeong. The EP was released on May 20, 2020, by Woollim Entertainment and distributed by Kakao M. The album contains seven tracks, including the lead single "Tiger Eyes".

== Background and release ==
Ryu Su-jeong debuted in a girlgroup Lovelyz in November 2014. On May 6, 2020, Woollim Entertainment announced Ryu Su-jeong would make her solo debut on mid May following her fellow member Kei who debuted as a solo singer on 2019. The next day the release date was revealed to be on May 28, 2020 along with the album title "Tiger Eyes". On May 11, the voice teaser for title track "Tiger Eyes" was released. A scheduler for "Tiger Eyes" was released on May 12 followed by series of teasers along with track videos. On May 16 the highlight medley released through Lovelyz official SNS. The 30 seconds music video teaser was released on May 18. The album was released on May 20 along with the music video for "Tiger Eyes".

== Track listing ==
No.	Title	Lyrics	Music	Arrangement	Length
1.	"Be Cautious"	Big Sancho (Yummy Tones); Good Vibes (Yummy Tones)	Good Vibes (Yummy Tones); Big Sancho (Yummy Tones)	Big Sancho (Yummy Tones); Good Vibes (Yummy Tones)	1:04
2.	"Tiger Eyes"	Seo Ji-eum	Mayu Wakisaka; Phil Schwan; Sean Michael Alexander	Phil Schwan	3:37
3.	"CALL BACK"	Yoon Sang-jo; Kang Yeon-wook	Yoon Sang-jo; Kang Yeon-wook	Yoon Sang-jo; Kang Yeon-wook	3:46
4.	"Your Name" (너의 이름)	Kim Ho-gyeong	1601	1601	3:38
5.	"42="	4beontaja; Jang Su-a	4beontaja; Jang Su-a	4beontaja; Socratone	3:16
6.	"Na, Ni" (나,니)	Choi Nak-ta	Choi Nak-ta	Choi Nak-ta	3:06
7.	"Lullaby (zz)" (자장가)	Ryu Su-jeong	Ryu Su-jeong	Hwang Hyeon-seong	4:21
Total length:					22:54

== Charts ==
Chart (2020)	Peak position
Gaon Album Chart	9
