= New Car (EP) =

EP by Ryu Su-jeong
- Released: July 25, 2025
- Recorded: 2024–2025
- Genres: K-pop; alternative pop
- Length: 15:36
- Label: House of Dreams
- Producers: Ryu Su-jeong; Dolly (Hwang Hyun-seong); Jade; Marldn

Ryu Su-jeong chronology
2Rox (2024)	New Car (2025)	All The Colors I Am (2025)

Singles from New Car
- 1. "New Car" Released: July 25, 2025

Music video
- "New Car" on YouTube

New Car (stylized in all capital letters) is the third extended play by South Korean singer-songwriter Ryu Su-jeong. The EP is Ryu's first release after leaving the management company Artist Rider. It was released on July 25, 2025. The EP consists of five tracks, including the title track "New Car".

== Background and release ==
On June 30, 2025 it was announced that Ryu Su-jeong's independent label "House of Dreams" would part ways with the management company Artist Rider. Shortly after this announcement, on July 7, Ryu announced through social media that her third EP "New Car" would be released on July 25. On July 8, it was announced that Ryu would held her fourth solo concert "Still Driving" on August 1 to promote the EP. On July 25, Ryu went on Instagram live to unbox the EP, later that day the EP as well as the music video for the title track "New Car" were released. In an interview with HallyuTones, Ryu stated that she was closely involved in the production and visual direction for the EP.

== Track listing ==
No.	Title	Lyrics	Music	Arrangement	Length
1.	"Bad Bye"	Ryu Su-jeong	Ryu Su-jeong; Dolly (Hwang Hyun-seong)	Ryu; Dolly	3:04
2.	"New Car"	Ryu; Dolly	Ryu; Dolly	Ryu; Dolly	3:20
3.	"Bibaram"	Ryu	Ryu; Jade; Marldn	Jade	2:51
4.	"Venus & a bowl soup"	Ryu; Doughy	Ryu; Dolly	Ryu; Dolly	3:20
5.	"Beautiful"	Ryu	Ryu; Dolly	Ryu; Dolly	3:01
Total length:					15:36

== Charts ==
Chart (2025)	Peak position
South Korean Albums (Circle)	42

== Sales ==
Region	Sales
South Korea	2,524
