= Everybody Wants to Know Molly =

EP by Molly Grace
- Released: October 22, 2021
- Genre: Pop
- Length: 22:45
- Label: Independently Released

Molly Grace chronology
Everybody Wants to Know Molly (2021)	Lovesick (EP) (2023)

Singles from Everybody Wants to Know Molly
- 1. "Here I Am" Released: 2021; 2. "Love's Made a Fool of Me" Released: 2021; 3. "Sunday Dinner" Released: 2021

Everybody Wants to Know Molly is the debut extended play by American singer Molly Grace. The soul-influenced pop EP was released independently by Grace in 2021.

== Background ==
Everybody Wants to Know Molly was released during Molly Grace's sophomore year of college at Belmont University. "Sunday Dinner" was the first song written for the album, a playful song about planning a date with a possible lover.

The only song from the EP to receive a music video was "What if I? (The Grocery Store Song)," a song about a breakup while referencing various popular grocery stores. The video was directed by Penny Kapadoukakis.

== Track listing ==
All tracks are written by Molly Grace Zeytoonian

No.	Title	Length
1.	"Not This Again"	04:11
2.	"Sunday Dinner"	03:06
3.	"Love's Made a Fool of Me"	03:37
4.	"Where We Said"	04:04
5.	"What If I? (The Grocery Store Song)"	03:28
6.	"Here I Am"	04:17
Total length:		22:45
