= Ryu Su-jeong =

South Korean singer (born 1997)

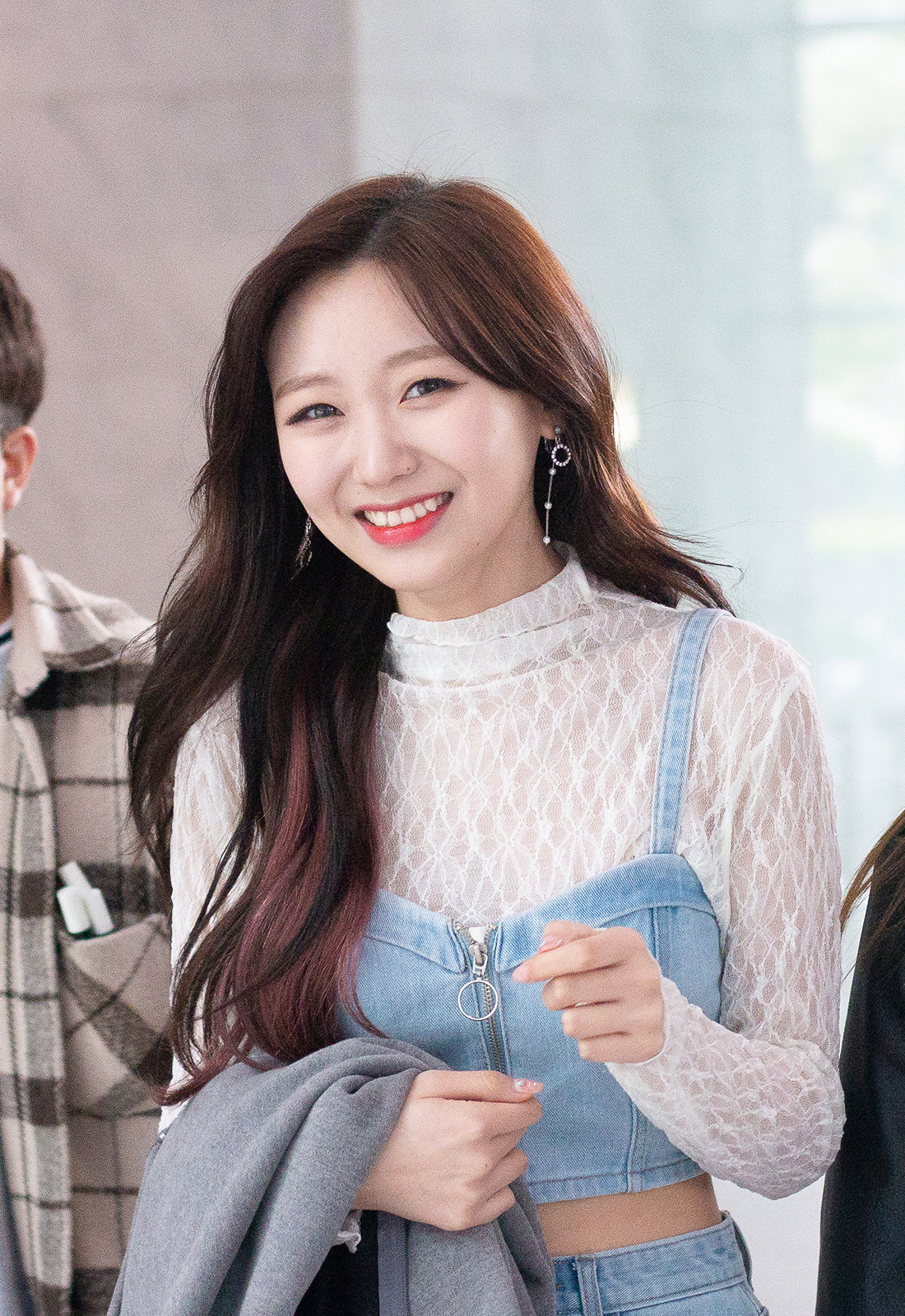
- Ryu in May 2018
- Born: Ryu Su-jeong; November 19, 1997 (age 28); Daejeon, South Korea
- Occupation: Singer
- Musical career
- Genre: K-pop
- Instrument: Vocals
- Years active: 2014–present
- Labels: Woollim; House of Dreams; all my anecdotes
- Member of: Lovelyz

Korean name
- Hangul: 류수정
- Hanja: 柳樹整
- RR: Ryu Sujeong
- MR: Ryu Sujŏng

Ryu Su-jeong (Korean: 류수정, born November 19, 1997), known mononymously as Sujeong, is a South Korean singer and a member of South Korean girl group Lovelyz. She debuted as a solo artist with her first EP, Tiger Eyes, on May 20, 2020.

Following Lovelyz's contract expiration and resulting hiatus in November 2021, Ryu decided to not renew her contract with Woollim. She later established her own independent label House of Dreams on September 1, 2022. In September 2026, Ryu signed an exclusive contract with "all my anecdotes", a company created by Lee Haein.

== Career ==
=== 2014–2021: Debut with Lovelyz and solo debut ===
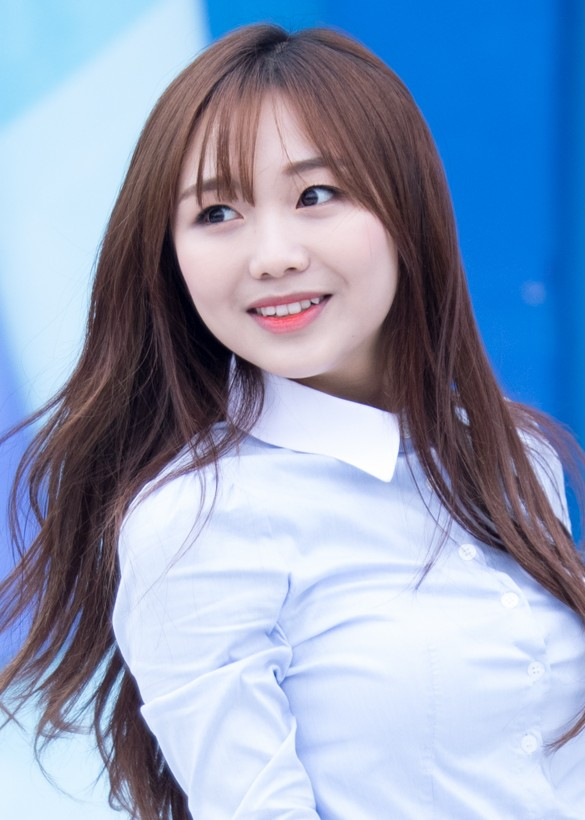
Ryu Su-jeong in 2015

Ryu Su-jeong debuted in girlgroup Lovelyz on November 17, 2014. The group's debut studio album Girls' Invasion was officially released on November 17, along with its lead single titled "Candy Jelly Love". She made her solo debut under Woollim Entertainment with an extended play Tiger Eyes on May 20, 2020.

=== 2022–present: Independent solo career ===
On November 16, 2021, Ryu left Woollim Entertainment after deciding not to renew her contract. She later established the independent label, "House of Dreams" on September 1, 2022. On March 21, she announced that she is going to release her first studio album Archive of Emotions on April 20, 2023 with the pre-release title track "Love or Hate" which was released on March 30, 2023. The title track, "Grabby Girl" was released alongside the album.

In January 2024, she announced her second extended play, 2Rox with some tracks in collaboration with American Artist XYLØ. Pre-Release track "Fallen Angel" was released on January 10, 2024 while all other tracks were released on January 24, 2024 including the lead single "Shxt".

On May 16, 2024, she released "Orange Juice" featuring fellow Lovelyz member Yein.

On August 22, she released the digital single "White Dress."

On October 8, she released her first Japanese song, "T-Shirt."

On June 30, 2025 it was announced that Artist Rider would part ways from managing "House of Dreams". Following this announcement, on July 7, Ryu announced her third EP New Car which released on July 25. On November 19, she released the single album Melted Love. Ryu released her 4th mini album, All the Colors I Am, on September 11, 2026.

== Discography ==
=== Studio albums ===
Title	Details	Peak chart positions	Sales
Title	Details	KOR	Sales
Archive of Emotions	Released: April 20, 2023; Label: House of Dreams; Formats: CD, digital download, streaming; Track listing: 1. "Non-Fantasy"; 2. "Grabby Girl"; 3. "Wrong"; 4. "Daydreaming"; 5. "Pathetic Love"; 6. "Fluffy Kitty"; 7. "Drown..."; 8. "Love or Hate"; 9. "How Can I Get Your Love"; 10. "Grabby Girl (Instrumental)"; 11. "Love or Hate (Instrumental)"	49	KOR: 5,246

=== Extended plays ===
Title	Details	Peak chart positions	Sales
Title	Details	KOR	Sales
Tiger Eyes	Released: May 20, 2020; Label: Woollim Entertainment; Formats: CD, digital download, streaming; Track listing: 1. "Be Cautious"; 2. "Tiger Eyes"; 3. "CALL BACK"; 4. "Your Name"; 5. "42"; 6. "NA, NI"; 7. "Lullaby (zz)"	9	KOR: 12,208
2Rox	Released: January 24, 2024; Label: House of Dreams; Formats: CD, digital download, streaming; Track listing: 1. "Fallen Angel" ft. XYLØ; 2. "Bad Grls" ft. XYLØ; 3. "SHXT" ft. XYLØ; 4. "Fallen Angel (Instrumental)"; 5. "SHXT (Instrumental)"	45	KOR: 2,634
New Car	Released: July 25, 2025; Label: House of Dreams; Formats: SMC, digital download, streaming; Track listing: 1. "Bad Bye"; 2. "NEW CAR"; 3. "Bibaram"; 4. "Venus & a bowl soup" 5. "Beautiful"	42	KOR: 2,524
All The Colors I Am	Released: September 11, 2026; Label: All my anecdotes; Formats: NFC, digital download, streaming; Track listing: 1. "Crying to" 2. "Diamond"; 3. "Lucky Charms"; 4. "shoulda woulda coulda" 5. "Birthday Cake"; 6. "Friendly Fire"	80	KOR: 745

=== Single albums ===
Title	Details	Peak chart positions	Sales
Title	Details	KOR	Sales
Melted Love	Released: November 19, 2025; Label: House of Dreams; Formats: digital download, streaming; Track listing: 1. "Slime"; 2. "Morning Coffee"	—	—

=== Singles ===
Title	Year	Peak chart positions		Album
Title	Year	KOR	KOR Hot	Album
As lead artist
"Tiger Eyes"	2020	—	99	Tiger Eyes
"Come Out" (나와)	2022	—	—	Non-album single
"Dearest" (고백)	2022	—	—	Archive of Emotions
"Pink Moon"	2022	—	—	Archive of Emotions
"Love or Hate"	2023	—	—	Archive of Emotions
"Grabby Girl"	2023	—	—	Archive of Emotions
"Fallen Angel" (feat. Xylø)	2024	—	—	2Rox
"SHXT" (feat. Xylø)	2024	— (Note: "SHXT" did not enter the Circle Digital Chart, but entered the Circle Download Chart at number 130)	—	2Rox
"Walking on Clouds"	2024	—	—	Non-album single
"Orange Juice" (feat. Yein)	2024	—	—	Non-album single
"White Dress"	2024	—	—	Non-album single
"T-Shirt"	2024	—	—	Non-album single
"New Car"	2025	—	—	New Car
"Diamond"	2026	—	—	All The Colors I Am
As featured artist
"Bump" (부딪쳐) (Infinite H feat. Ryu Su-jeong)	2015	—	—	Fly Again
"If U" (Limzy feat. Ryu Su-jeong)	2022	—	—	Non-album single
"10 AM" (Logikal J feat. Ryu Su-jeong)	2025	—	—	Lazy
"Terminal" (Wooki feat. Ryu Su-jeong)	2025	—	—	Antibirth
Collaborations
"Start of Summer" (시작의 여름) (with Youngjun (Brown Eyed Soul))	2016	—	—	Non-album single
"Maybe We" (아마도 우린) (with D-Hack) *(Esquire Korea project)	2022	—	—	Non-album single
Soundtrack appearances
"Clean" (오늘도 맑음) (with Baby Soul (Lovelyz))	2016	—	—	Second to Last Love OST
"Deep Blue Eyes" (with Girls Next Door)	2017	—	—	Idol Drama Operation Team OST
"Lie After Lie" (거짓말의 거짓말)	2020	—	—	Lie After Lie OST
"Color Rush"	2021	—	—	Color Rush OST
"The Day, You Left" (그날, 우리)	2022	—	—	The Year We Turned 29 OST
"Recognize You" (널 알아볼 수 이있게)	2022	—	—	No Movie Series : A Bar With Emotions OST
"It's Spring Breezy Right Now" (봄바람 부는 지금)	2024	—	—	Artist 100 OST Part 9

=== Writing and production credits ===
All credits are adapted from the Korea Music Copyright Association, unless stated otherwise.

Year	Artist	Song	Album	Lyrics		Music	
Year	Artist	Song	Album	Credited	With	Credited	With
2017	Lovelyz	"Hide and Seek" (숨바꼭질)	R U Ready?	Yes	Razer (Strike)	No	–
2020	Ryu Su-jeong	"Lullaby" (zz (자장가))	Tiger Eyes	Yes	–	Yes	Hwang Hyun-sung
2020	Lovelyz	"Obliviate"	Unforgettable	Yes	Stardust, Jarry Potter (Yummy Tone)	No	–
2020	Lovelyz (Baby Soul, Ryu Su-jeong), Golden Child (Tag, Hong Joo-chan)	"Under The Sky of Suncheon" (순천의 하늘 아래에서)	Non-album single	Yes	Baby Soul, Tag, Hong Joo-chan	Yes	Tag
2022	D-Hack, Ryu Su-jeong	"Maybe We" (아마도 우린)	Non-album single	Yes	D-Hack	Yes	Hooshi, D-Hack, Hwang Hyun-sung
2022	Limzy	"If U"	Voyage Vol.1	Yes	Limzy, Dex, Shin Soo-yi	Yes	Limzy, Razer (Stardust)
2022	Jin	"Not A Coincidence" (어떻게 우연이겠어)	Non-album single	Yes	Dailog	No	–
2022	Ryu Su-jeong	"Dearest"	Archive of Emotions	Yes	–	Yes	–
2022	Ryu Su-jeong	"PINK MOON"	Archive of Emotions	Yes	–	Yes	Hwang Hyun-sung
2023	Ryu Su-jeong	"Love or Hate"	Archive of Emotions	Yes	–	Yes	JAW
2023	Ryu Su-jeong	"Daydreaming"	Archive of Emotions	Yes	–	Yes	JAW
2023	Ryu Su-jeong	"Non-Fantasy"	Archive of Emotions	Yes	–	Yes	JAW
2023	Ryu Su-jeong	"Grabby Girl"	Archive of Emotions	Yes	–	Yes	Hwang Hyun-sung
2023	Ryu Su-jeong	"WRONG"	Archive of Emotions	Yes	–	Yes	Hwang Hyun-sung
2023	Ryu Su-jeong	"Pathetic Love"	Archive of Emotions	Yes	–	Yes	JAW
2023	Ryu Su-jeong	"Fluffy Kitty"	Archive of Emotions	Yes	–	Yes	JAW
2023	Ryu Su-jeong	"Drown..."	Archive of Emotions	Yes	–	Yes	JAW
2023	Ryu Su-jeong	"How can i get your Love"	Archive of Emotions	Yes	–	Yes	JAW
2024	Ryu Su-jeong, XYLØ	"Fallen Angel"	2ROX	Yes	Paige Duddy, WOOKI	Yes	WOOKI
2024	Ryu Su-jeong, XYLØ	"BAD GRLS"	2ROX	Yes	Paige Duddy, Lee Newell	No	–
2024	Ryu Su-jeong, XYLØ	"SHXT"	2ROX	Yes	Paige Duddy, WOOKI	Yes	WOOKI
2024	Ryu Su-jeong	"Walking on Clouds"	Non-album single	Yes	–	Yes	Hwang Hyun-sung
2024	Ryu Su-jeong, Yein	"Orange Juice"	Non-album single	Yes	Paige Duddy, Lee Newell	Yes	Paige Duddy, Lee Newell, WOOKI
2024	Ryu Su-jeong	"White Dress"	Non-album single	Yes	–	Yes	JADE, Marldn
2024	Ryu Su-jeong	"T-Shirt"	Non-album single	Yes	–	Yes	Hwang Hyun-sung
2025	Ryu Su-jeong	"Bad Bye"	NEW CAR	Yes	Hwang Hyun-sung	Yes	Hwang Hyun-sung
2025	Ryu Su-jeong	"NEW CAR"	NEW CAR	Yes	Hwang Hyun-sung	Yes	Hwang Hyun-sung
2025	Ryu Su-jeong	"Bibaram"	NEW CAR	Yes	–	Yes	JADE, Marldn
2025	Ryu Su-jeong	"Venus & a bowl soup"	NEW CAR	Yes	Kim Du-i	Yes	Hwang Hyun-sung
2025	Ryu Su-jeong	"Beautiful"	NEW CAR	Yes	–	Yes	Hwang Hyun-sung
2026	OWIS	"airplane : 143"	MUSEUM	Yes	–	No	–

== Videography ==
Title	Year	Director
"Tiger Eyes"	2020	Zanybros
"Dearest" (고백)	2022	
"Pink Moon"	2022	Khoon (Sapiens)
"Love Or Hate"	2023	Kang Mingi (aarch film)
"Grabby Girl"	2023	Kang Mingi (aarch film)
"하루 세 번 하늘을 봐"	2023	Khoon (Sapiens)
"How Can I Get Your Love"	2023	Khoon (Sapiens)
"Fallen Angel"	2024	NKNR
"SHXT"	2024	Sohee Baek (815 Video)
"White Dress"	2024	S2aurus
"New Car"	2025	815 Video
"Bad Bye 💔"	2025	
"Beautiful 🏃‍♀️"	2025	
"Crying To"	2026	Oh Haegyun
"Diamond"	2026	Oh Haegyun
"Lucky Charms"	2026	Oh Haegyun
"shoulda woulda coulda"	2026	Oh Haegyun
"Birthday Cake"	2026	Oh Haegyun
"Friendly Fire"	2026	Oh Haegyun

== Filmography ==
=== Reality shows ===
Year	Title	Role	Notes
2015	2014 Best of Best	Host	with V (BTS)
2017	Idol Drama Operation Team	Cast member	
2019	King of Mask Singer	Contestant	as Kongjwi and Patjwi (Episode 185)
2019	Neighbourhood Album	Cast member	
