= Archive of Emotions =

Studio album by Ryu Su-jeong
- Released: April 20, 2023
- Recorded: 2022–2023
- Genres: R&B; K-pop; alternative pop
- Length: 33:17 (digital); 39:48 (physical)
- Languages: Korean; English
- Labels: House of Dreams; Artist Rider
- Producers: Ryu Su-jeong; Dolly (Hwang Hyun-seong); Jaw

Ryu Su-jeong chronology
Tiger Eyes (2020)	Archive of Emotions (2023)	2Rox (2024)

Singles from Archive of Emotions
- 1. "Love or Hate" Released: March 30, 2023; 2. "Grabby Girl" Released: April 20, 2023

Music video
- "Love or Hate" on YouTube
- "Grabby Girl" on YouTube

Archive of Emotions is the debut solo studio album by South Korean singer-songwriter Ryu Su-jeong. The album was released on April 20, 2023, through her independent label House of Dreams. The digital version of the album contains eleven tracks including the singles "Love or Hate" and "Grabby Girl", while the physical and Spotify version of the album also include the previously released singles, "Dearest" and "Pink Moon".

== Background and release ==
Ryu Su-jeong debuted in a girlgroup Lovelyz in November 2014 under Woollim Entertainment. Ryu made her solo debut in May 2020 with an extended play Tiger Eyes. On November 16, 2021, Ryu left Woollim Entertainment after deciding not to renew her contract. She later established an independent label, House of Dreams on September 1, 2022. Under her independent label, she started releasing singles, "Dearest" and "Pink Moon" in November 2022. In February 2023, in an interview with Locomotion, Ryu stated that she was working on an album to parent the two previously released singles with a plan to release it on spring.

On March 21, 2023, Ryu announced that she is going to release her first full album on April 20. On March 30, "Love or Hate" was released as a pre-release single along with the b-side "Daydreaming". The music video for "Love or Hate" that was filmed on Los Angeles was released on the same day. On April 20, prior to the album release, the music video for the song "How can i get your Love" was premiered through Billboard website. The album was released later that day on 6 PM KST along with the music video for the second single, "Grabby Girl".

To promote the album, Ryu performed "Love or Hate" and "Grabby Girl" on SBS funE The Show. On May 13 and 14, she held a concert "Ryu Sujeong 1st concert Archive of Emotions" at Baekam Art Hall.

== Track listing ==
All lyrics are written by Ryu Su-jeong; all music is composed by Ryu Su-jeong and Jaw, except where noted.

Archive of Emotions – Digital edition
No.	Title	Music	Length
1.	"Non Fantasy"		2:54
2.	"Grabby Girl"	Ryu Su-jeong; Dolly (Hwang Hyun-seong)	2:33
3.	"Wrong"	Ryu Su-jeong; Dolly (Hwang Hyun-seong)	3:27
4.	"Daydreaming (하루 세 번 하늘을 봐)"		3:16
5.	"Pathetic Love"		3:18
6.	"Fluffy Kitty"		2:51
7.	"Drown"		2:35
8.	"Love or Hate"		3:29
9.	"How can i get your Love"		2:51
10.	"Grabby Girl (Instrumental)"	Ryu Su-jeong; Dolly (Hwang Hyun-sung)	2:33
11.	"Love or Hate (Instrumental)"		3:29
Total length:			33:17

Archive of Emotions – Physical and Spotify Digital edition
No.	Title	Music	Length
10.	"Dearest (고백)"	Ryu Su-jeong; Dolly (Hwang Hyun-sung)	3:08
11.	"Pink Moon"	Ryu Su-jeong; Dolly (Hwang Hyun-sung)	3:23
Total length:			39:48

=== Notes ===
"Wrong" and "Pink Moon" are stylized in all caps.

== Charts ==
=== Weekly charts ===
Chart (2023)	Peak position
South Korean Albums (Circle)	49

=== Monthly charts ===
Chart (2023)	Peak position
South Korean Albums (Circle)	98

== Sales ==
Region	Sales
South Korea	5,246
