= MARIS =

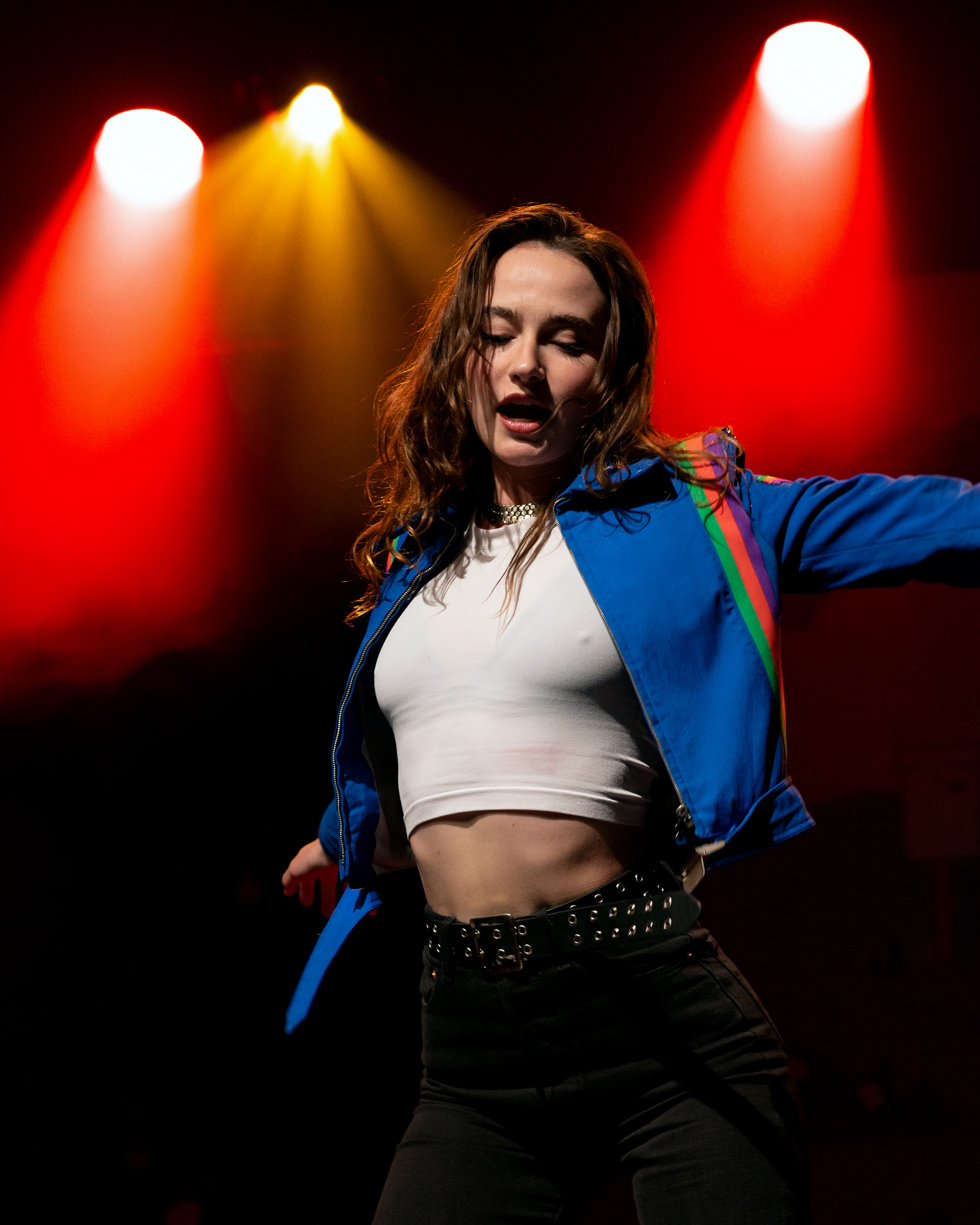
- Maddux-Ward in 2023

Background information
- Also known as: Bear, Marmar, Marbear
- Born: Maris Maddux-Ward; September 16, 1999 (age 27); Missoula, Montana, U.S.
- Origin: Missoula, Montana/Los Angeles, California
- Genres: Pop; rock
- Occupation: Singer-songwriter
- Years active: 2009–present
- Label: Black House
- Website: www.marisofficial.com

Maris Maddux-Ward, (born September 16, 1999) known mononymously as MARIS (stylized in all caps) is an American singer-songwriter.

== Career ==
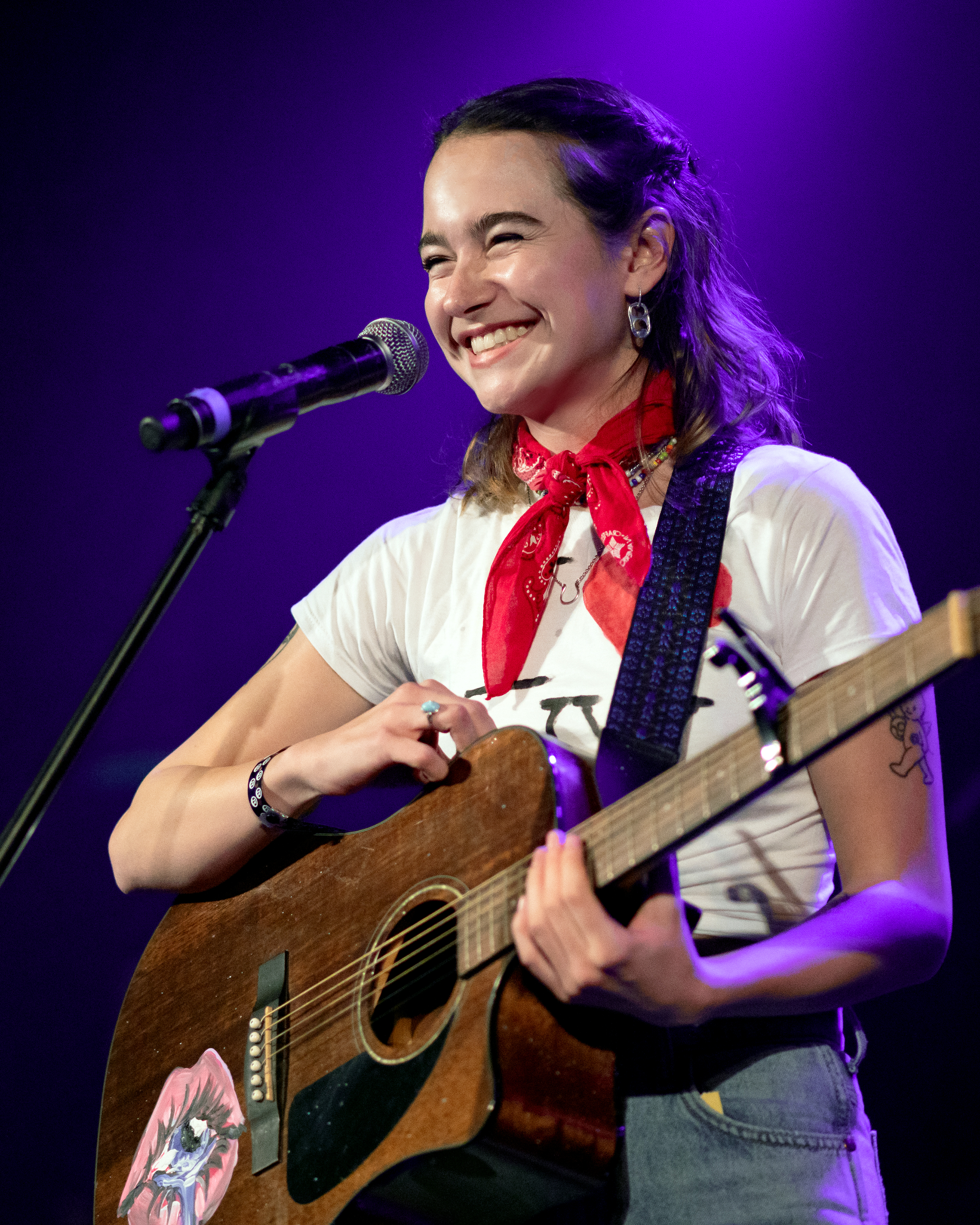
MARIS (Justin Higuchi, 2021)

On New Year's Eve of 2014, Maris was selected as the winner of the 10th First Night Spotlight.

In March 2017, Maris participated in American Idol season 16.

In 2023, she released the album Gravity, accompanied by a short film titled Gravity: The EP: the Movie. The project was supported by tours opening for Anna of the North and The Wrecks, and appearances at Boston Calling and Missoula Pride in 2024. That same year, she opened for Melt on their U.S. tour.

In 2025, MARIS opened for Maude Latour on the Sugar Water Tour.

During this period, she released the single “Give Me a Sign” featuring Caroline Kingsbury, which reached one million streams within a month of release. The track was added to more than 25 Spotify editorial playlists and featured in 20 New Music Friday placements.

In June 2025, she announced her debut U.S. co-headlining tour with Kingsbury, scheduled to run from September to October 2025, with dates in cities including San Diego, Dallas, Nashville, New York, Boston, Chicago, and Los Angeles.

== Personal life ==
Maris's father is a doctor and her mother is involved in real estate. She developed a passion for music, especially jazz, around the age of six.

MARIS has cited artists including Queen, Whitney Houston, Prince, and One Direction among her influences.

== Discography ==
=== Extended plays ===
Title	Year	Track listing	Ref
Of Love & Rain	2015	"Green Eyed Baby"; "Alaska"; "Let It Rain"; "Night Crawlers"; "Feel Like I Know You"; "Soft Sigh Lullaby"; "After You've Gone (cover)"	
Of the Sea	2016	"Principium"; "Something I Did?"; "Demons on My Back"; "Heart Strings"; "Liar"; "Cherry"; "Modern Romance"; "Shark"; "From Up Above"; "disposable"; "honey."; "Undertow"	
Gravity	2023	"Heavenly Bodies"; "Was It A Dream?"; "False Idol"; "Crashland"; "Goodbye Forever"; "outofmydepth"	
MOSH★PIT	2026	"Nothing To Do (nananananana)"; "Body Is On Fire"; "MOSH★PIT"; "that's my girl"; "Losing People"; "Missing Me"	

=== Singles ===
==== As lead artist ====
Title	Year	Ref
"BOYS"	2017	
"Sick"	2017	
"What He Wants"	2017	
"18 Forever"	2018	
"Shallow"	2018	
"White Knuckles"	2019	
"Elephant Skeleton"	2020	
"GOING YET!"	2023	
"Hot Guitar Player"	2023	
"Voicemail"	2023	
"Julia Roberts"	2024	
"The Fight"	2024	
"Salt Water Taffy"	2024	
"Chameleon"	2024	
"Give Me A Sign" (featuring Caroline Kingsbury)	2025	
"Mary + I"	2025	
"IT'S HARD (to be a Man)"	2025	
"SUPER F★CKING MEGA ST★R"	2025	
"Christmas Now"	2025	
"KM$"	2026	

==== As featured artist ====
Title	Year	Ref
"Jolene" (Scott Bradlee's Postmodern Jukebox feat. Maris)	2017	
"Still Into You" (Scott Bradlee's Postmodern Jukebox feat. Maris)	2018	
"Seven Minutes" (Honeymoon Arcade feat. Maris)	2019	
"Girls Just Wanna Be Famous(er)" (Meg Smith feat. Molly Grace & MARIS)	2025	

=== Songwriting credits ===
Title	Year	Artist	Album	Ref
"Existential Crisis"	2025	Wendy	Cerulean Verge	
