= 2Rox =

EP by Ryu Su-jeong
- Released: January 24, 2024
- Recorded: 2023
- Genres: K-pop; alternative pop
- Length: 15:18 (digital); 9:02 (physical)
- Labels: House of Dreams; Artist Rider
- Producers: Wooki; Lee Newell

Ryu Su-jeong chronology
Archive of Emotions (2023)	2Rox (2024)	New Car (2025)

Singles from 2Rox
- 1. "Fallen Angel" Released: January 10, 2024; 2. "Shxt" Released: January 24, 2024

Music video
- "Fallen Angel" on YouTube
- "Shxt" on YouTube

2Rox (stylized in all capital letters) is the second extended play by South Korean singer-songwriter Ryu Su-jeong. The EP is a collaboration with American singer-songwriter Xylø. It was released on January 24, 2024. The EP consists of three tracks, including the pre-release single "Fallen Angel" and the lead single "Shxt".

== Background and release ==
On November 13, 2022 it was announced that Ryu Su-jeong would make an appearance as a special guest for Xylø's South Korea Fanmeeting on November 19. During the show Ryu and Xylø performed "Bad Grls" prior to its release and announced that they would collaborate for a project "2Rox". In an interview for the album release, Ryu said she often listened to Xylø's music and decided to reach out to her on social media for a collaboration because she felt Xylø’s style and image fit the dark pop direction she wanted for her next project. Xylø accepted the offer as she was interested in K-pop.

On November 24, a pop-up event was held to preview the upcoming album. On December 19, Ryu announced the release date for the album and pre-release single. "Fallen Angel" was released on January 10, 2024 as a pre-release single. The album was released on January 24, along with the track video for the lead single "Shxt". To promote the album, Ryu held her second concert The Fallen Angel on February 15 and 16.

== Track listing ==
2Rox – Physical edition
No.	Title	Lyrics	Music	Arrangement	Length
1.	"Bad Grls (feat. Xylø"	Lee Newell; Paige Duddy; Ryu Su-jeong	Newell; Duddy	Newell; Wooki	2:48
2.	"Shxt (feat. Xylø)"	Ryu; Duddy	Ryu; Wooki	Wooki	2:46
3.	"Fallen Angel (feat. Xylø)"	Ryu; Duddy	Ryu; Wooki	Wooki	3:28
Total length:					9:02

2Rox –Digital edition
No.	Title	Music	Arrangement	Length
4.	"Shxt - Instrumental"	Ryu; Wooki	Wooki	2:46
5.	"Fallen Angel - Instrumental"	Ryu; Wooki	Wooki	3:28
Total length:				15:18

=== Notes ===
"Bad Grls" and "Shxt" are stylized in all caps.

== Charts ==
Chart (2024)	Peak position
South Korean Albums (Circle)	45

== Sales ==
Region	Sales
South Korea	2,634
