= Paige Turner (musician) =

American singer-songwriter

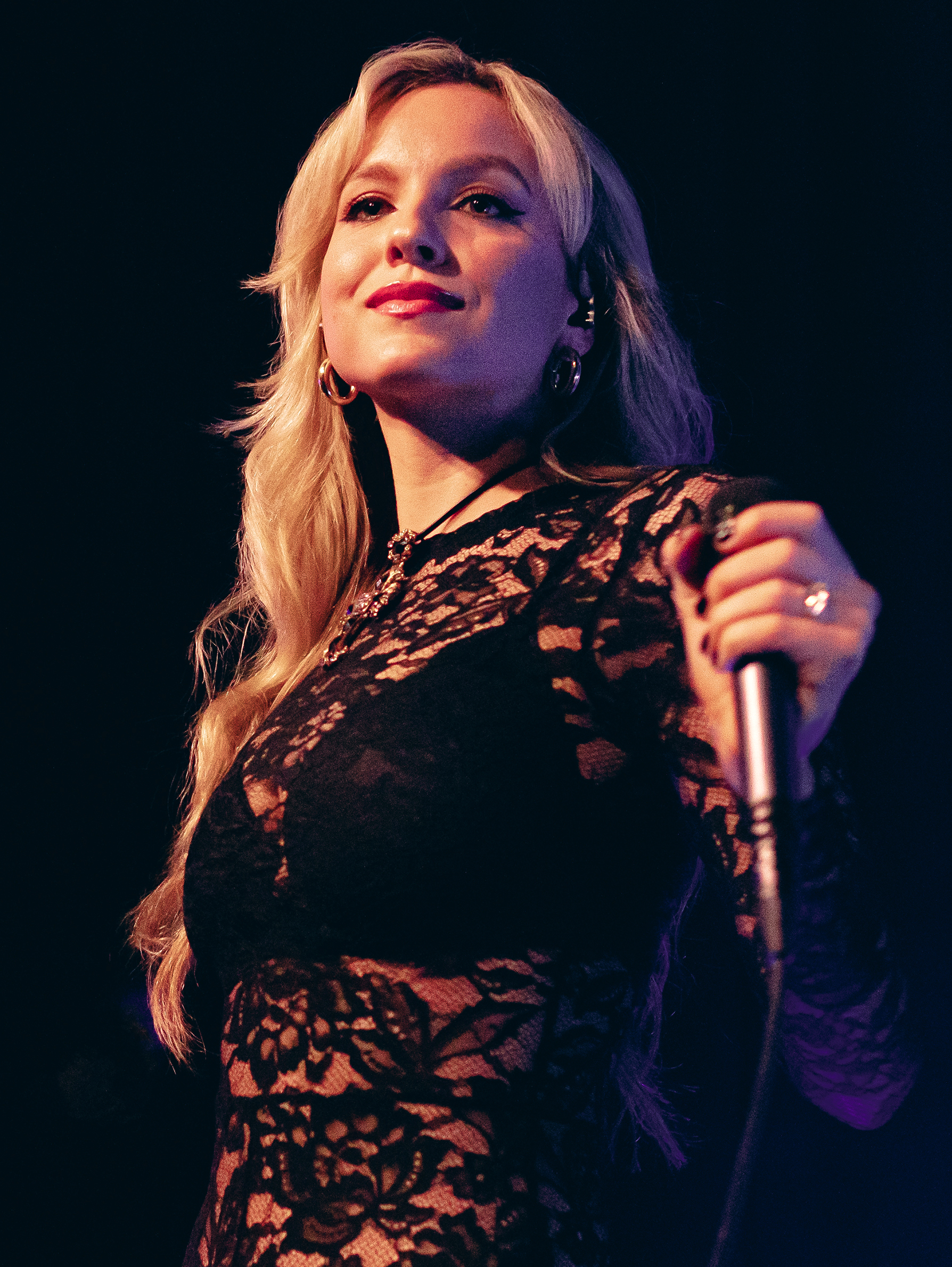
- Xylø performing in 2022

Background information
- Born: August 8, 1994 (age 32); United States
- Origin: Los Angeles, California, US
- Genres: Alternative pop; electropop; indie pop; dance-pop; synth-pop; Alternative rock
- Years active: 2015–present
- Labels: Sumerian; Sony; Columbia; Disruptor
- Members: Paige Duddy
- Past members: Chase Duddy
- Website: www.xylo-music.com

Paige Duddy, also known as Paige Turner, is an American singer-songwriter. She began her career as a member of the musical duo Xylø (stylised in all caps) with her brother and maintained the name as a solo project after his departure. Since 2024, she has been the lead vocalist and songwriter, for the band Sunday (1994).

As a duo, Xylø was best known for the debut single, "America", which was self-released in February 2015 and saw commercial success online through digital outlets such as NoiseTrade. The single's success resulted in Xylø securing a record deal with Sony Music Entertainment. Following the departure of Chase in 2018, Paige continued to release new music under the moniker. The releases included four EPs: Pretty Sad, Yes and No, The Ganglands of My Heart and Outsiders Club. All were released under independent label Pretty Records. The title track from Yes & No is her most successful song on Spotify to date, garnering almost 30 million streams as of December 2021.

== Background ==
Paige Duddy is the granddaughter of late jazz drummer Joe Porcaro, and niece of three members of Toto.

== Career ==
=== 2015-2017: America EP and singles ===
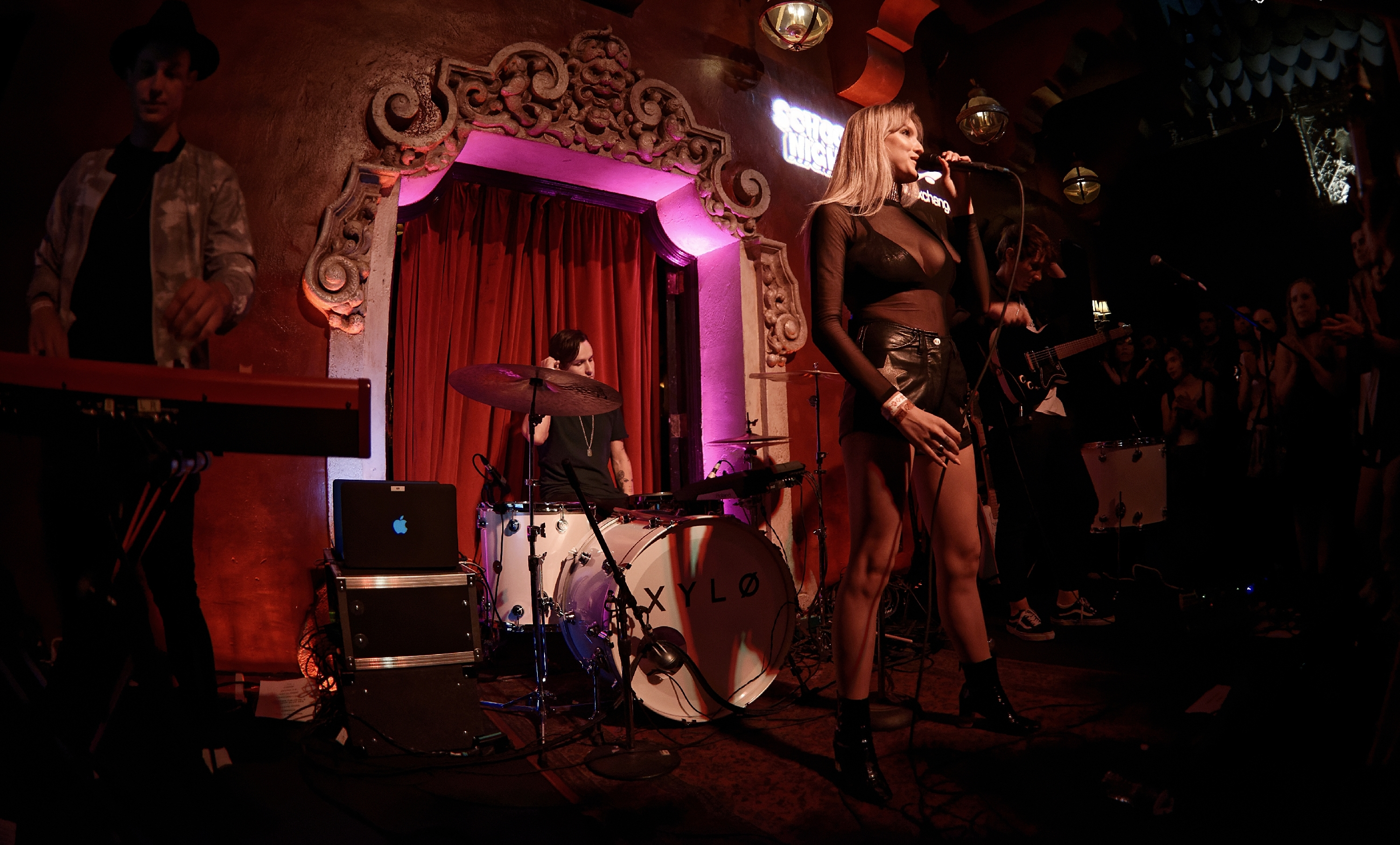
Paige Duddy performing in 2016

In February 2015, XYLØ released their debut single, "America", which received attention on YouTube. The self-released song was promoted through Hype Machine and NoiseTrade. The song eventually made it onto the top 10 of the Hype Machine chart and was debuted on American radio through KCRW.

On June 4, XYLØ released their second song, "Between the Devil and the Deep Blue Sea". Through Apple Music, the duo released their third song, "Afterlife", on July 22, 2015. In September 2015, they were featured as special guests on Oh Wonder's live show in Los Angeles. Their fourth song, entitled "L.A. Love Song", was released on October 7, 2015. The following month, the group announced they were taking a break to focus on producing more material. Shortly afterward, they announced as signees to Sony Music Entertainment.

In 2016, the duo had embarked on a number of their own live shows and released their debut EP, America. On February 19, 2016, they announced their fifth single "Bang Bang", released through Apple Music. Two days before the extended play's release, they announced their sixth and final single to be released through the EP, entitled "BLK CLD", released February 26, 2016. The EP was released on February 27, 2016, through Sony Music Entertainment. During the release, the duo launched their official VEVO channel on YouTube with the music video for their debut single "America", which sparked the single's official release, to celebrate a year since its original release. On June 10, 2016, they released the America (The Remixes) EP, which includes remixes from Young Bombs and Win & Woo. The group was slated to headline a North American tour with 26 dates across the US and Canada, but the tour was cancelled on August 29, 2017, "due to unforeseen circumstances".

The duo released a new single "Fool's Paradise" on August 5, 2016. The duo was featured on "Setting Fires" by the Chainsmokers, released as part of the Collage EP on November 4, 2016. "Gossip" was released on September 7, 2016. The instrumental of the song was used by Apple in their commercial for the Apple Keynote. They went on to release two more singles, "Dead End Love" and "Get Closer" before 2017 ended. Both of which gained accompanying music videos.

In 2017, they released the single "I Still Wait For You" which become arguably their most successful single to date. They also released the singles "Alive" and "What We're Looking For" as a two-part series in music video form.

=== 2018–2020: Chase's departure and multiple EPs ===
On June 1, 2018 "Heaven Only Knows" was released. Paige announced via Twitter that Chase had left the group to focus on other projects, leaving her as the sole member. "Don't Panic" was released on June 29, 2018, and "I Don't Want To See You Anymore" was released on August 3, 2018. Xylø went on to release "Tears & Tantrums" and "Freak" later in the year, both of which had music videos. Sometime at the end of 2018, Paige cut ties with Disruptor Records, and started releasing her music under the independent label Pretty Records.

On February 12, 2019, it was announced that an EP titled Pretty Sad would be released March 1, 2019. The lead single "Nothing Left To Say" was released two days later. It was announced via social media on May 3, 2019, that Xylø's new EP, Yes & No, would be released on May 31, 2019, with the lead single "Ride or Die" being released on May 17. On May 21, 2019, a second single "The End" was announced to be released on May 24, 2019. In June 2019, Xylø announced she would be embarking on the Yes & No Tour, which concluded in September 2019. She released her fourth EP, The Ganglands of My Heart on February 14, 2020, which was preceded by the singles "Tongue in the Bag" and "American Sadness".

On March 27, 2020, a compilation album including all the instrumentals from her three previous releases was released.

Later that year, Xylø released her fifth EP, Outsiders Club, for which she launched an official website for. The EP was released on November 20, 2020, with "Apple Pie", "Chlorine", and "Lefty" being released as singles prior to the EP's release. Music videos were also released for the latter two singles.

=== 2021–present: Unamerican Beauty and American tour ===
During 2021, Xylø teased via social media that her debut album was in the works. On December 13, Xylø posted on various social medias a photo of her and the phone number "(310)-564-7089". By calling the number, Xylø reads the listener a monologue. Two days later, Xylø uploaded an official trailer for the album, revealing the album's title to be Unamerican Beauty and that it would be released in 2022. Xylø then also announced via Twitter that the album's first single would be released in January. The album was finally released in June 9. In order to promote the album, Xylo embarked on the 10 date Unamerican Beauty Tour through North America in October.

In January 2024, she was featured in Lovelyz's Ryu Su-jeong's second extended play 2Rox, "Fallen Angel" which was released on January 10, 2024, and "SHXT" which was released on January 24, 2024.

== Discography ==
=== Studio albums ===
List of studio albums, with selected details
Title	Details
Unamerican Beauty	Released: June 9, 2022; Label: Pretty Records, Opposition; Formats: CD, digital download

=== Extended plays ===
Title	Details
America	Released: February 26, 2016; Label: Columbia, Disruptor; Formats: CD, digital download
America (The Remixes)	Released: June 10, 2016; Label: Columbia, Disruptor; Format: Digital download
Pretty Sad	Released: March 1, 2019; Label: Pretty Records; Format: CD, Digital download
Yes & No	Released: May 31, 2019; Label: Pretty Records; Format: CD, Digital download
The Ganglands of My Heart	Released: February 14, 2020; Label: Pretty Records; Format: CD, Digital download
Outsiders Club	Released: November 20, 2020; Label: Pretty Records; Format: CD, Digital download

=== Compilation albums ===
Title	Details
The Instrumentals	Released: March 27, 2020; Label: Pretty Records; Formats: Digital download

=== Singles ===
==== As lead artist ====
Title	Year	Album
"America"	2015	America
"Between the Devil and the Deep Blue Sea"	2015	America
"Afterlife"	2015	America
"L.A. Love Song"	2015	America
"Fool's Paradise"	2016	Non-album singles
"Gossip"	2016	Non-album singles
"Dead End Love"	2016	Non-album singles
"Get Closer"	2016	Non-album singles
"I Still Wait for You"	2017	Non-album singles
"Alive"	2017	Non-album singles
"What We're Looking For"	2017	Non-album singles
"Heaven Only Knows"	2018	Non-album singles
"Don't Panic"	2018	Non-album singles
"I Don't Want to See You Anymore"	2018	Non-album singles
"Tears & Tantrums"	2018	Non-album singles
"Freak"	2018	Non-album singles
"Nothing Left To Say"	2019	Pretty Sad
"Fireworks"	2019	Pretty Sad
"Ride or Die"	2019	Yes & No
"The End"	2019	Yes & No
"Tongue In The Bag"	2020	The Ganglands Of My Heart
"American Sadness"	2020	The Ganglands Of My Heart
"Apple Pie"	2020	Outsiders Club
"Chlorine"	2020	Outsiders Club
"Lefty"	2020	Outsiders Club
"aliens"	2022	Unamerican Beauty
"sweetheart"	2022	Unamerican Beauty
"sugar free rush"	2022	Unamerican Beauty

=== As a featured artist ===
List of singles as featured artist, with selected chart positions, showing year released and album name
Title	Year	Peak chart positions								Certifications	Album
Title	Year	US	AUS	BEL (FL)	CAN	NLD	NZ	SWE	UK	Certifications	Album
"Setting Fires" (The Chainsmokers featuring Xylø)	2016	71	50	10	35	84	— (Note: "Setting Fires" did not enter the NZ Top 40 Singles Chart, but peaked at number 2 on the NZ Heatseeker Singles Chart.)	92	55	RMNZ: Gold	Collage
"Sometimes" (DallasK and Nicky Romero featuring Xylø)	2019	—	—	—	—	—	—	—	—		Non-album single
"Closer Still (Xylø Remix)" (Tender)	2019	—	—	—	—	—	—	—	—		"Closer Still (Xylø Remix)"
"Bulletproof" (The Score featuring Xylø)	2019	—	—	—	—	—	—	—	—		Non-album single
"SHXT" (Ryu Su-jeong ft. XYLØ)	2024	—	—	—	—	—	—	—	—		2ROX
"Fallen Angel" (Ryu Su-jeong ft. XYLØ)	2024	—	—	—	—	—	—	—	—		2ROX
"Bad Grls" (Ryu Su-jeong ft. XYLØ)	2024	—	—	—	—	—	—	—	—		2ROX
"—" denotes a recording that did not chart or was not released in that territory.

=== Songwriting and production credits ===
Title	Year	Artist(s)	Album	Notes
"Chasing Colors" (with Ookay featuring Noah Cyrus)	2017	Marshmello	Non-album single	Chase Duddy wrote the song, along with Marshmello, Ookay and Skyler Stonestreet.
"Fight Like a Girl"	2017	Zolita	Sappho	Written by Zolita, Xylø and Lee Newell, being this later also the producer.
"New You"	2018	Zolita	Sappho	Written by Zolita, Xylø and Lee Newell, being this later also the producer.
"Like Heaven"	2018	Zolita	Sappho	Written by Zolita, Xylø and Lee Newell, being this later also the producer.
"Remind Me"	2018	Zolita	Sappho	Written by Zolita, Xylø and Lee Newell, being this later also the producer.
"Spotless"	2018	Zolita	Sappho	Written by Zolita, Xylø and Lee Newell, being this later also the producer.
