= Free Range (musician) =

Sofia Jensen, known professionally as Free Range, is an American indie folk musician. They grew up in the Rogers Park neighborhood of Chicago. Under the Free Range moniker, Jensen announced plans to release their first album, titled Practice, on December 7, 2022. The album was released on February 17, 2023. Jensen began writing for the album when they were fifteen years old, alongside their live drummer Jack Henry. The album received the attention of numerous publications, including Pitchfork, Chicago Reader, New Noise Magazine, and Paste.

In 2025, Free Range released their second album, titled Lost & Found.
