= Chelsea Lankes =

American electro-pop musician

- Origin: Fort Worth, Texas
- Genres: Pop, indie pop, electro-pop
- Years active: 2010–present
- Labels: B3SCI Records
- Website: www.chelsealankes.com

Chelsea Lankes is an American electro-pop musician from Fort Worth, Texas.

== Career ==
Lankes began her career in 2010, chronicling the creation of her first EP on her blog. To Begin With, Everything was released in 2011, and the following year a second EP, Ringing Bell, followed.

Lankes released another EP in March 2015 titled Down For Whatever/Too Young to Fall In Love. Since then she has released the singles Secret and Ghost.
