= Sunday (1994) =

English–American dream pop band

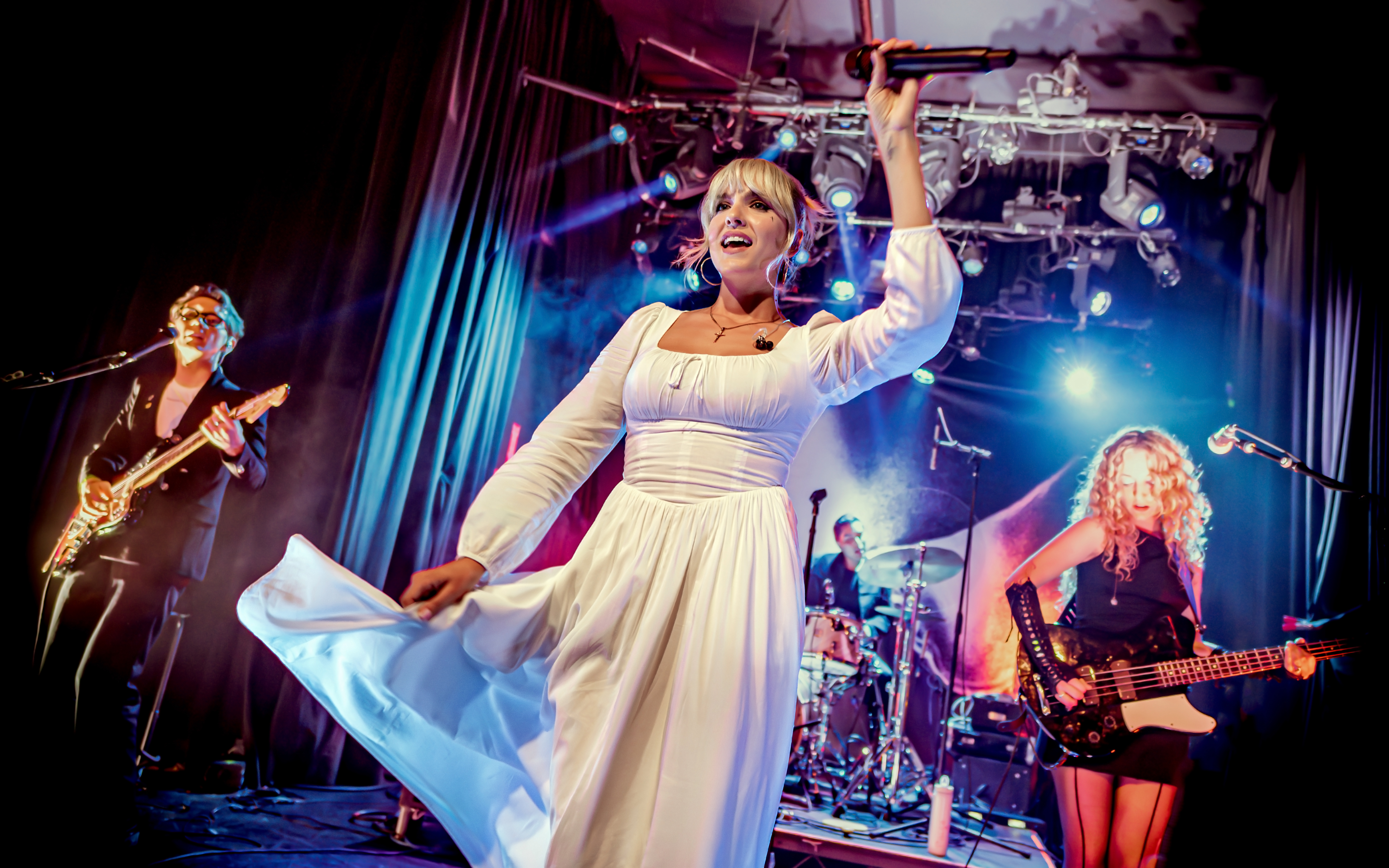
- Sunday (1994) in 2024 at The Echo in Los Angeles.: Pictured: Lee Newell, Paige Turner, Puma, Lola Bates

Background information
- Origin: Los Angeles, California, USA
- Genre: Dream-pop
- Works: Discography, songs
- Label: RCA Records UK
- Members: Paige Turner; Lee Newell; Puma; Christine Meisenhelter
- Past members: Lola Bates
- Website: www.sunday1994.com

Sunday (1994) is an English-American dream pop band based in Los Angeles, California. The group consists of Paige Turner from Los Angeles, California, Lee Newell from Slough, England and Puma from Lima, Peru.

== History ==
Turner and Newell met in 2014, where they began writing songs together for other artists and for advertisements. When the COVID-19 pandemic began, the two began the process of writing songs for themselves to release. They began uploading songs to TikTok where they instantly received a few thousand views. In 2024, they released their debut self-titled EP. They followed that release with a deluxe version of the EP. As of 2024, Turner and Newell had been in a relationship together, as well as creative partners, for a decade.

In February 2025, the group released a new song titled "Doomsday". On May 9, 2025, they released their second EP, Devotion. A deluxe edition of Devotion was released on March 13, 2026, featuring three additional tracks, "Shame", "Darling, I've Done This Dance Before", and "The Fairground".

== Members ==
Current

- Paige Turner (born Paige Duddy) – lead vocalist, songwriter (formerly a member of Xylø)
- Lee Newell (born Leonard Newell) – guitarist, co-songwriter (formerly a member of Viva Brother and Lovelife)
- Puma – drums
- Christine Meisenhelter – bassist (2026 live touring member)

=== Past ===
- Lola Bates (formerly known as Lola Colette) - bassist (2024-2025 live touring member)

== Discography ==
=== Extended Plays (EPs) ===
Title	Details
Sunday (1994)	Release Date: May 3, 2024; Label: Arista Records, RCA Records; Format: Digital download, CD, CD-R,
Devotion	Release Date: May 9, 2025; Label: Arista Records, RCA Records; Format: Digital download, CD, Vinyl

=== Singles ===
Title	Release Date	Year	Album
"Tired Boy"	February 23	2024	Sunday (1994)
"Stained Glass Window"	April 4	2024	Sunday (1994)
"TV Car Chase"	July 10	2024	Sunday (1994) [Deluxe]
"Softly"	August 9	2024	Sunday (1994) [Deluxe]
"Doomsday"	February 21	2025	Devotion
"Rain"	April 11	2025	Devotion
"Devotion"	May 4	2025	Devotion
