= Flower Face =

Canadian folk musician

- Born: Ruby McKinnon; Windsor, Ontario, Canada
- Genres: Goth-folk , dreampop
- Years active: 2013-present
- Labels: Nettwerk Music Group; The Feldman Agency (TFA)
- Website: flowerface.com

Ruby McKinnon, known professionally as Flower Face, is a Canadian goth-folk and dreampop musician based in Montreal.

== Biography ==
McKinnon was born in Windsor, Ontario, Canada. Her dad was a band musician who worked in radio; her mom was a writer of short fiction. She began playing classical piano at age five. Her earliest work was lofi music on Bandcamp that she made in her bedroom as a teenager. She was in music lessons and doing conservatory until she turned 16. She was diagnosed with ovarian cancer in 2015 at age 17. She was diagnosed with stage 3 cancer and had to go through chemotherapy This experience inspired her to pursue music full time, stating, "Okay, no, this is what I have to do, because I could literally die tomorrow. Why am I not pursuing music full-time? This is what I feel like I was meant to do..." Her album Fever Dreams came out two years after her cancer diagnosis. Her stage name Flower Face was a nickname originally used by her grandmother.

McKinnon started writing music and producing "DIY albums" as a teenager. She has described herself as very online and "very into Tumblr" at that time. She launched the records on Bandcamp "and grew something of an audience." She studied for a BFA at the University of Windsor.

Her music has been characterized as "gentle." The album The Shark in Your Water has been described as her breakthrough. As of 2024, her songs "Angela" and "Spiracle" have "enjoyed some nice glimpses of widespread, online regard." Her 2024 release Girl Prometheus was deemed "intense and magical" by Stereogum. Girl Prometheus is a breakup album; the single "Maniac" from the album sets "the acoustics of the guitar, her flowy vocals, and pleasant-sounding melodies" against "cut-throat lyrics."

== Discography ==
=== Studio albums ===
Title	Year
Every Part of You That's Left in Me	2013
Homesick	2014
Fever Dreams	2017
Baby Teeth	2018
The Shark in Your Water	2022
Girl Prometheus	2024
Kill the Muse	2027

=== Extended plays ===
- Funeral Kid (2014)

=== Singles ===
Title	Year	Album
"Honey and Milk"	2017	Baby Teeth
"Baby Teeth"	2018	Baby Teeth
"Bedhead"	2019	Non-album singles
"Ruth"	2019	Non-album singles
"Is It Me or Is It You" (Dean Drouillard (feat. Flower Face))	2020	Non-album singles
"The Garden"	2020	Non-album singles
"Ain't No Sunshine"	2020	Non-album singles
"No Way Home" (Oliver Ignatius (feat. Flower Face))	2020	Non-album singles
"Kaleidoscope"	2021	Non-album singles
"Cornflower Blue"	2021	The Shark in Your Water
"Back to You"	2021	The Shark in Your Water
"Sugar Water"	2022	The Shark in Your Water
"Pisces Moon"	2022	The Shark in Your Water
"October Birds"	2022	The Shark in Your Water
"O Holy Night"	2022	Non-album single
"The Shark in Your Water (Alternate Versions)"	2022	The Shark in Your Water
"Cat's Cradle"	2024	Girl Prometheus
"Valentine"	2024	Girl Prometheus
"Skeleton Key"	2024	Girl Prometheus
"Maniac"	2024	Girl Prometheus
"If I Beg You"	2024	Girl Prometheus
"Valentine (Extended)"	2025	Non-album single
Bad Dream	2026	Kill The Muse
Better The Devil	2026	Kill The Muse
