= The Yards (Washington, D.C.) =

Urban park development in Washington, D.C.

- Logo
- Interactive map of The Yards
- Location: Washington, D.C.
- Address: 355 Water St SE, Washington, DC 20003
- Coordinates: 38.873531°N 77.001099°W
- Status: Completed
- Groundbreaking: 2007
- Estimated completion: 2014
- Opening: 2010
- Website: DCYards.com

Companies
- Developer: Forest City

Technical details
- Size: 42 acres (17 ha)

The Yards is a 42-acre (17 ha) development on the Anacostia River waterfront in Washington, D.C. The area is at the center of the Capitol Riverfront Business Improvement District and was originally an annex of the Washington Navy Yard. The development is part of the larger Navy Yard neighborhood. In 2004, the U.S. General Services Administration awarded the property to Forest City Washington, Inc. for redevelopment into an area with 2,800 new residential units and 2,200,000 sq ft (200,000 m^{2}) of office and retail space. The development is situated in the Navy Yard neighborhood, located just west of the historic Washington Navy Yard and east of Nationals Park. It is served by the Navy Yard – Ballpark station on the Green Line of the Washington Metro.

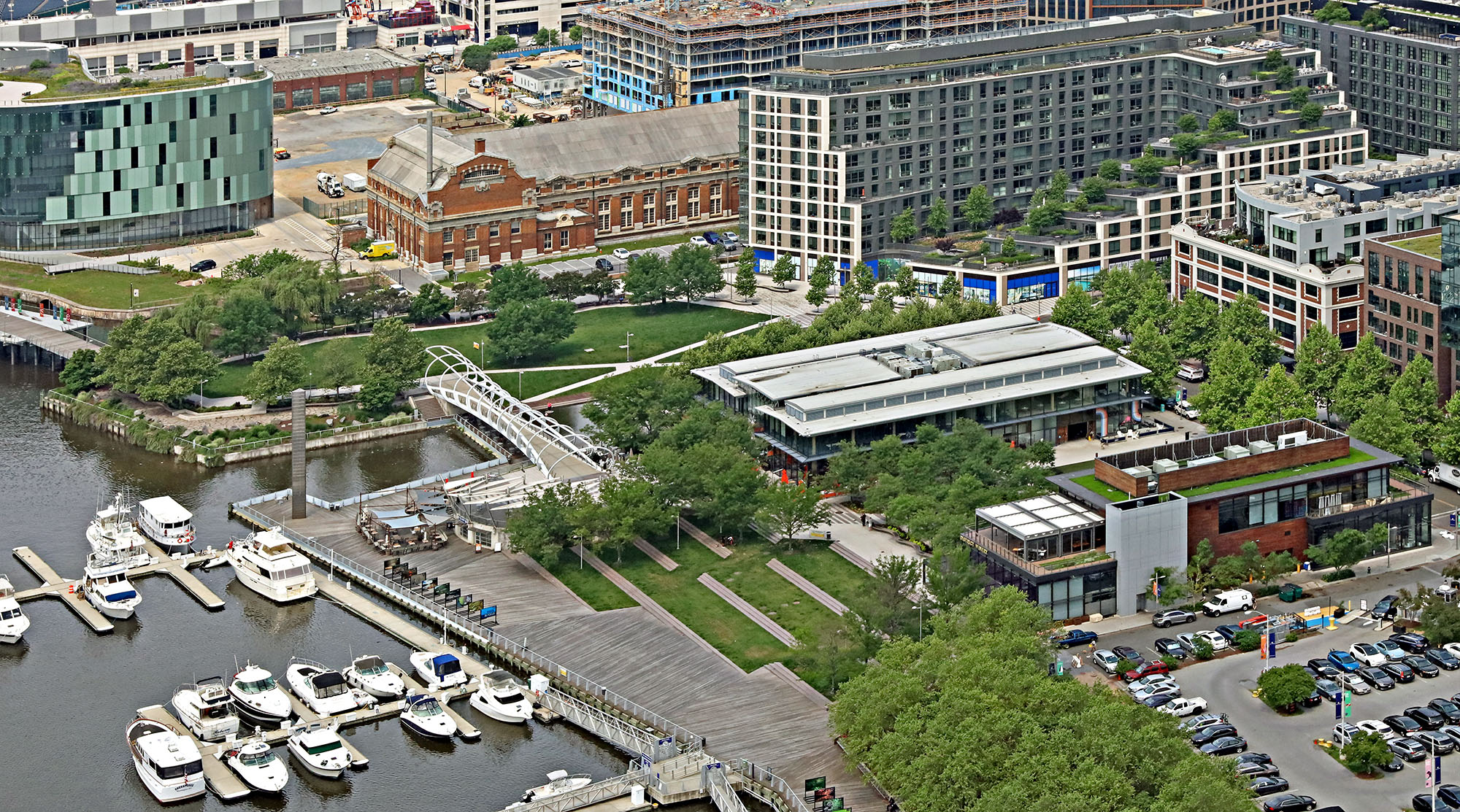
The Yards Park, Washington DC

The Navy Yard neighborhood was Washington's earliest industrial neighborhood, situated at the natural deepwater port along the Anacostia River. One of the earliest buildings was the Sugar House, built in Square 744 at the foot of New Jersey Avenue SE as a sugar refinery in 1797-98. In 1805, it became the Washington Brewery, which produced beer until it closed in 1836. The brewery site was just west of the Washington City Canal in what was, until recently, Parking Lot H/I in the block between Nationals Park and the historic DC Water pumping station. That plot now hosts an apartment building named Vela and another development under construction.

The centerpiece of the development is the Yards Park, which forms a portion of the Anacostia Riverwalk. It is a waterfront recreation area, boardwalk, and outdoor performance space at the center of The Yards development. It was built as a public-private partnership between the District government, the General Services Administration, and Forest City Washington development company. The park is operated by the Capitol Riverfront BID and has won several design and urban planning awards since it opened in 2010. Yards Park was designed by landscape architect M. Paul Friedberg.

Yards Park
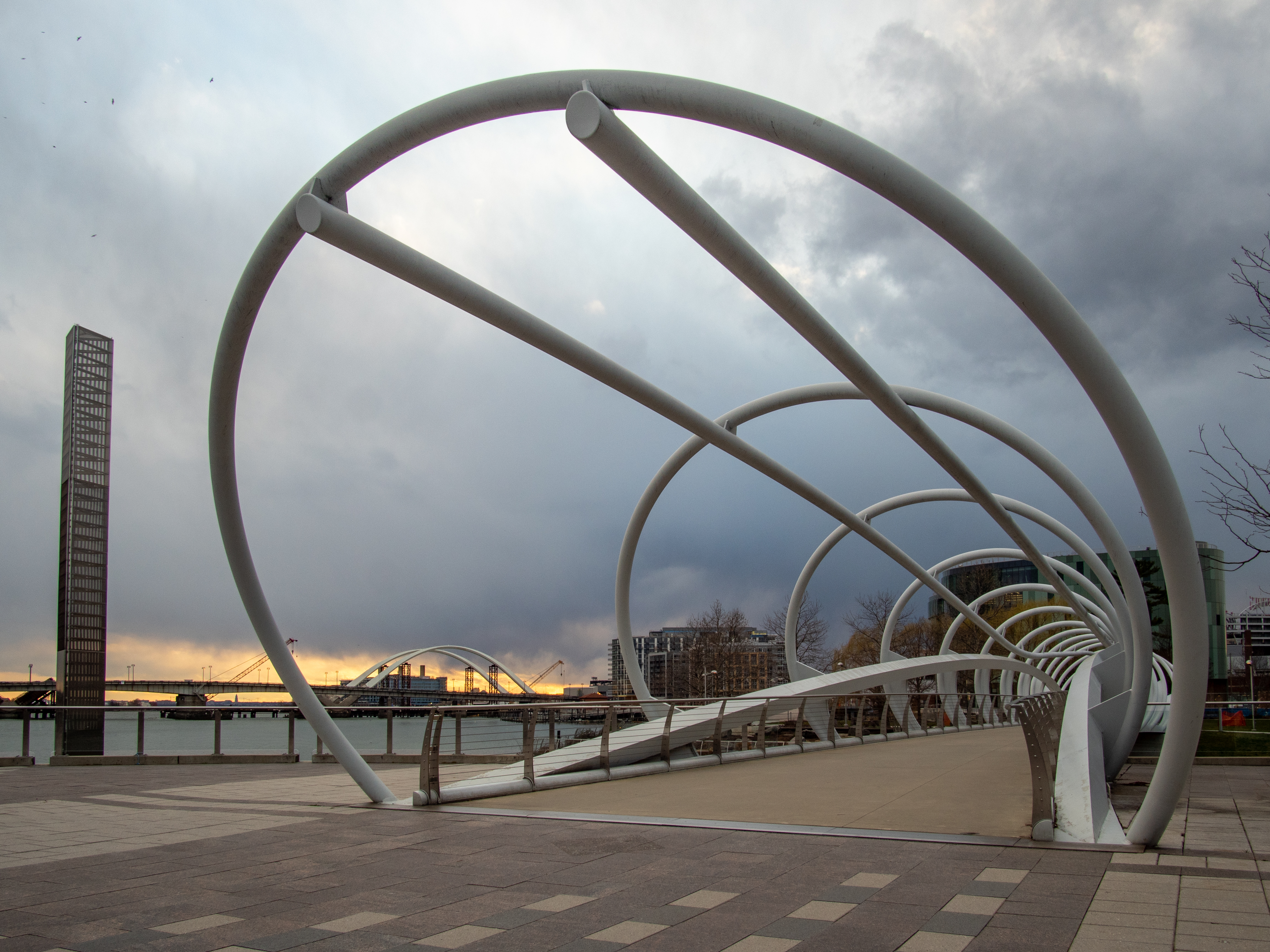
Bridge at Yards Park

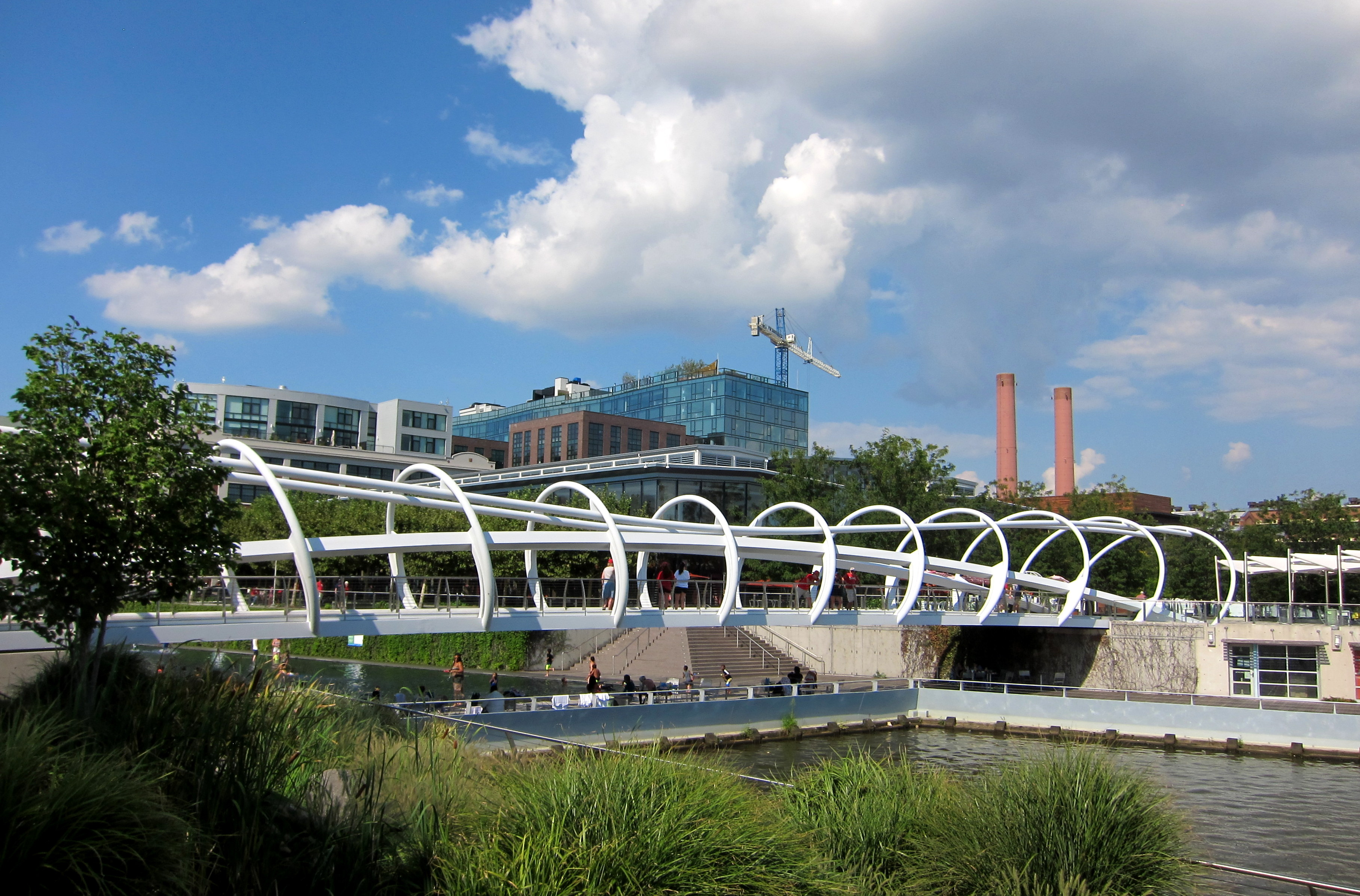
The bridge at Yards park

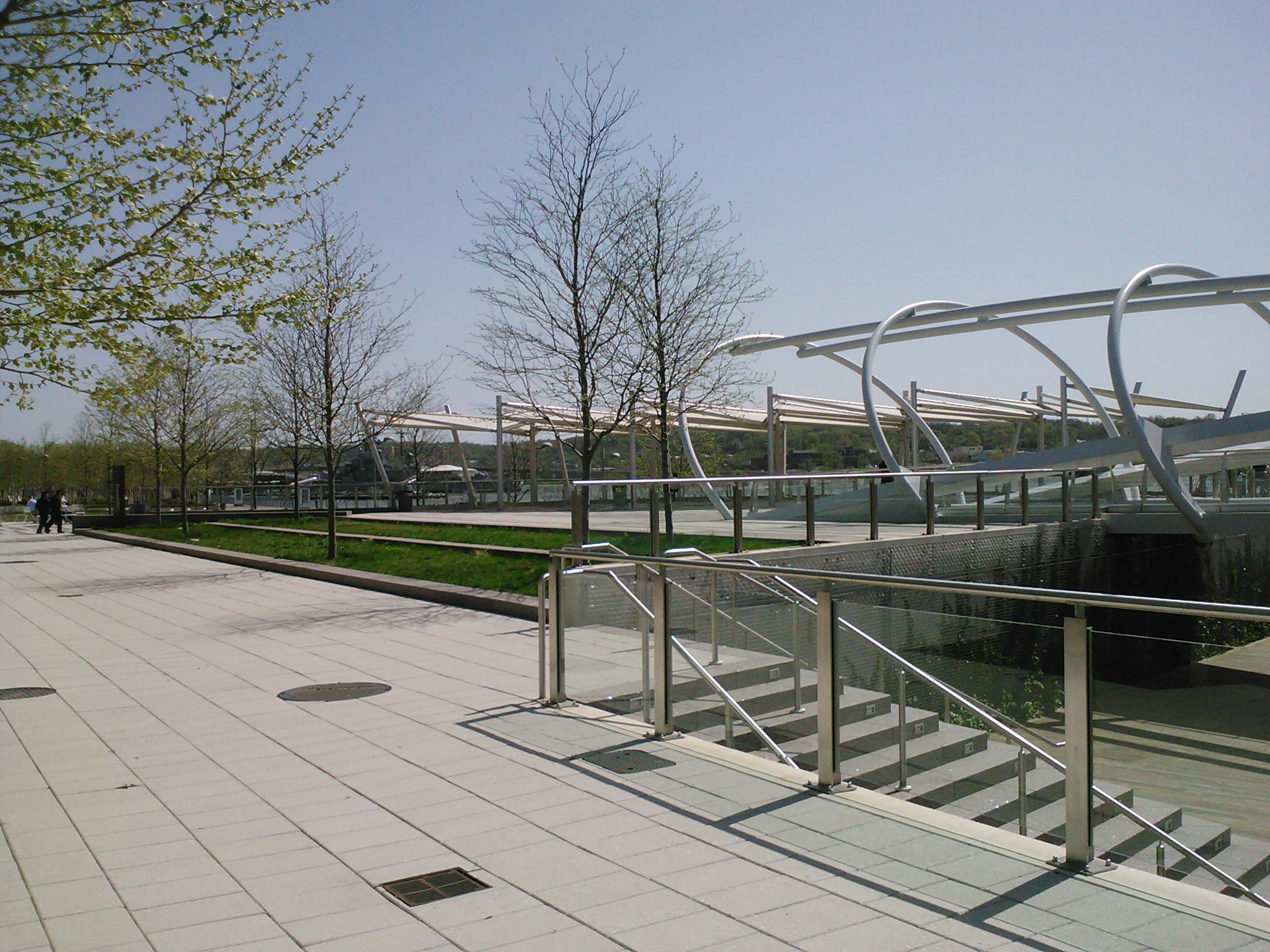
Part of the grounds and bridge at Yards park

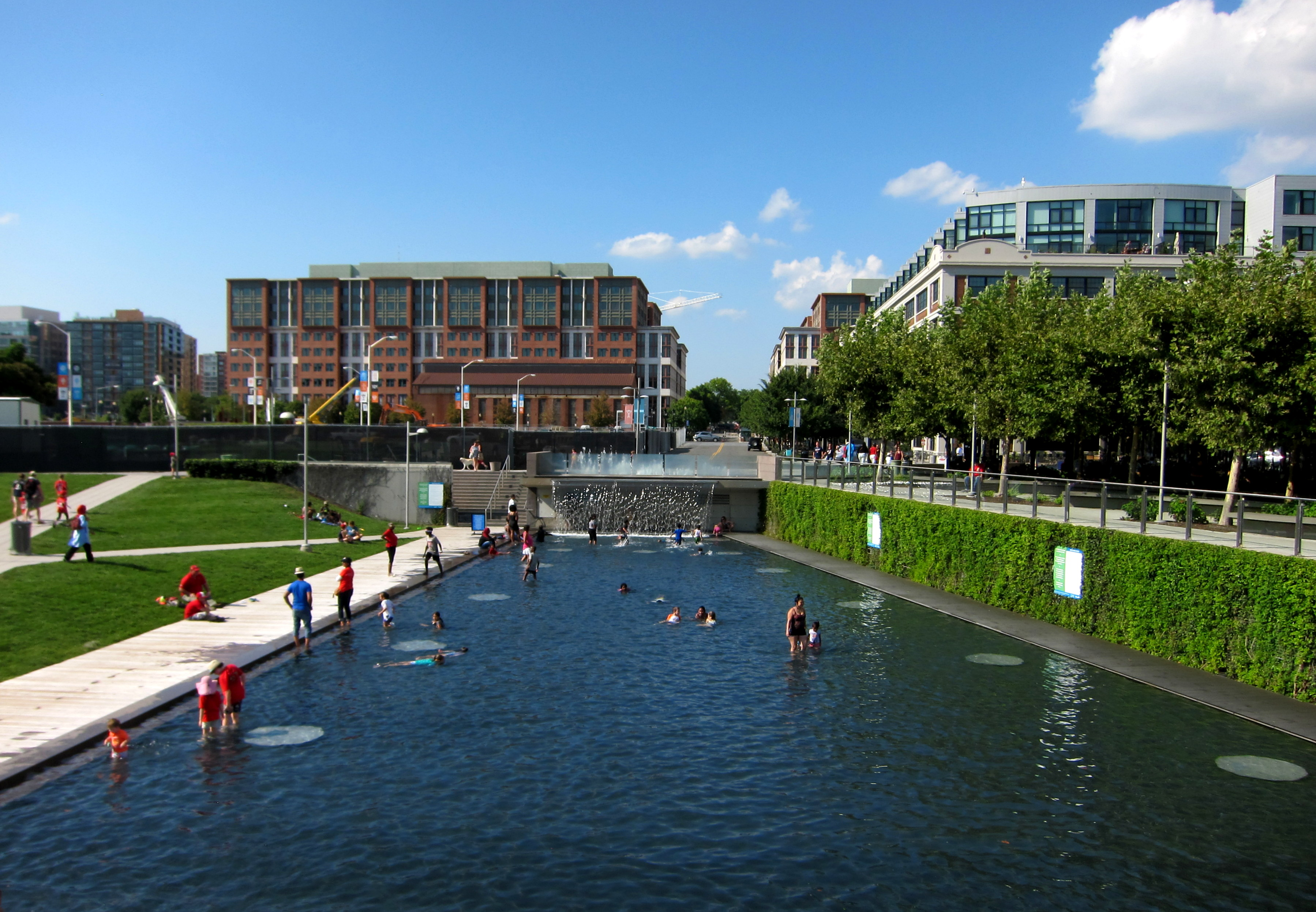
The Yards park in August 2017

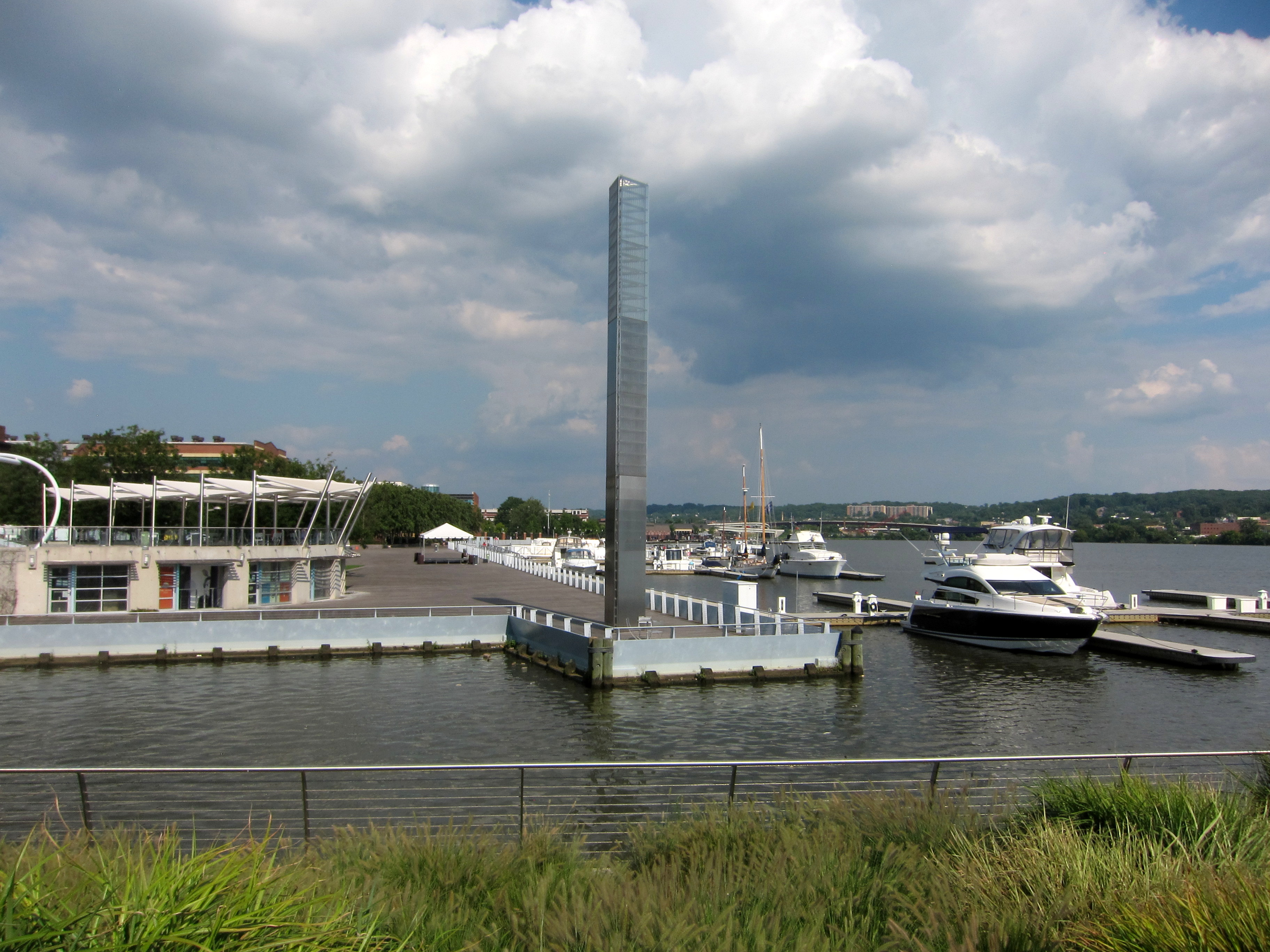
A decorative monolith standing along the riverwalk
