= Setting Fires (song) =

Single by The Chainsmokers featuring Xylø

from the EP Collage
- Released: November 4, 2016
- Genre: Dance-pop; electropop; EDM
- Length: 4:07
- Label: Disruptor; Columbia
- Songwriters: Andrew Taggart; Melanie Fontana; Jon Asher
- Producer: The Chainsmokers

The Chainsmokers singles chronology
"All We Know" (2016)	"Setting Fires" (2016)	"Paris" (2017)

"Setting Fires" is a song by American DJ duo the Chainsmokers, released as the final single from the duo's second extended play, Collage (2016). It features the vocal collaboration of American electronic music duo Xylø. The song was written by Melanie Fontana, Jon Asher and Andrew Taggart. "Setting Fires" was released on November 4, 2016, through Disruptor Records and Columbia Records.

== Composition ==
The song is written in the key of G♯ minor with a common time tempo of 105 beats per minute. Xylø's vocals span from F♯_{3} to A♯_{5} in the song.

== Chart performance ==
"Setting Fires" debuted and peaked at number 71 on the US Billboard Hot 100 issued for November 26, 2016. The Recording Industry Association of America (RIAA) certified the song Gold, which denotes 500,000 units based on sales and track-equivalent on-demand streams. On the Hot Dance/Electronic Songs chart, it entered at number eight and spent 20 weeks in total. "Setting Fires" peaked at number 35 on the Canadian Hot 100 and was certified Gold by Music Canada. The song reached number 50 in Australia and was certified Platinum. It charted within the top 40 of national record charts, at number 26 in Scotland, and number 31 in Czech Republic.

== Track listing ==
Digital download – Remixes
No.	Title	Length
1.	"Setting Fires" (featuring Xylø) (Blasterjaxx Remix)	3:32
2.	"Setting Fires" (featuring Xylø) (Sigma Remix)	4:16
3.	"Setting Fires" (featuring Xylø) (Vanic Remix)	2:49
4.	"Setting Fires" (featuring Xylø) (Qulinez Remix)	3:26
5.	"Setting Fires" (featuring Xylø) (Boxinbox x Lionsize Remix)	3:11
Total length:		17:14

== Personnel ==
Credits adapted from the EP liner notes, Collage (2016).

- Jordan "DJ Swivel" Young – producer, mixing engineer, recording engineer
- The Chainsmokers – producer, associated performer
- Xylø – associated performer
- Melanie Fontana – background vocals
- Chris Gehringer – mastering engineer

== Charts ==
=== Weekly charts ===
Weekly chart positions for "Setting Fires"
Chart (2016)	Peak position
Australia (ARIA)	50
Austria (Ö3 Austria Top 40)	57
Belgium (Ultratip Bubbling Under Flanders)	10
Belgium (Ultratip Bubbling Under Wallonia)	29
Canada Hot 100 (Billboard)	35
Czech Republic Singles Digital (ČNS IFPI)	31
Ireland (IRMA)	63
Mexico Airplay (Billboard)	34
Netherlands (Single Top 100)	84
New Zealand Heatseekers (Recorded Music NZ)	2
Portugal (AFP)	84
Scotland Singles (Official Charts)	26
Slovakia Singles Digital (ČNS IFPI)	44
Sweden (Sverigetopplistan)	92
Switzerland (Schweizer Hitparade)	73
UK Singles (Official Charts)	55
UK Dance (Official Charts)	18
US Billboard Hot 100	71
US Hot Dance/Electronic Songs (Billboard)	8

=== Year-end charts ===
Year-end chart positions for "Setting Fires"
Chart (2016)	Position
US Hot Dance/Electronic Songs (Billboard)	94
Chart (2017)	Position
US Dance/Electronic Songs (Billboard)	33

== Certifications ==
Certifications for "Setting Fires"
Region	Certification	Certified units/sales
Australia (ARIA)	Platinum	70,000^{‡}
Brazil (Pro-Música Brasil)	Gold	30,000^{‡}
Canada (Music Canada)	Platinum	80,000^{‡}
New Zealand (RMNZ)	Gold	15,000^{‡}
United States (RIAA)	Gold	500,000^{‡}
^{‡} Sales+streaming figures based on certification alone.
