= Jelani Aryeh =

American indie rock musician

Jelani Aryeh is an American indie rock musician from San Diego, California.

== History ==
Aryeh began his career as a member of the collective raised By The Internet, which was formed by Aryeh on a Brockhampton forum. Aryeh released his first EP, Suburban Destenisia, in 2017. Aryeh released his debut album, I've Got Some Living To Do, in 2021. In early 2024, Aryeh released a new song titled "I'm In Love". In 2024, Aryeh announced his second full-length album titled The Sweater Club. The album was released on June 14. Prior to the albums release, Aryeh released the singles "Sweater Club" and "Hang On".

== Discography ==
Studio albums

- Helvetica (2019)
- I've Got Some Living To Do (2021)
- The Sweater Club (2024)

EPs

- Suburban Destenisia (2017)
