= Capitol Riverfront =

Business improvement in Washington, D.C., U.S.

Coordinates: 38.877°N 77.001°W

The Capitol Riverfront is a business improvement district (BID) located just south of the United States Capitol between Capitol Hill and the Anacostia River in Washington, D.C. It was created by the District of Columbia City Council and approved by Mayor Fenty in August 2007. The BID is a mixed-use neighborhood. It was a former industrial area transformed into a business center, urban neighborhood, entertainment district, and waterfront destination. The project involves adding over 9,000 new apartments, condominiums, lofts, modern office towers, 1,200 hotel rooms, one million square feet of retail amenities, two grocery stores, new restaurants, shops, and cafes. Over 33,900,000 square feet (3,150,000 m2) of office, residential, hotel, and retail space, as well as four new parks, were planned over 10–15 years. The new 5-acre (20,000 m^{2}) riverfront Yards Park opened in fall 2010.

The BID is governed by a board of directors composed of twenty property and business owners and seven non-voting community stakeholders. The BID's FY2009 budget was approximately $1.5 million and was funded by an assessment that applied to commercial property (including land and parking lots), residences of ten or more units, and hotels.

== Transportation ==
The Capitol Riverfront is served by the Navy Yard – Ballpark and Capitol South stations on the Washington Metro system. The neighborhood is also served by I-395 and I-295 and by a circulator bus route to Union Station, and it is a 10-minute taxi ride to Reagan National Airport.

A 16-mile (26 km) riverwalk provides a path for people to walk, run, or bike on along the banks of the Anacostia River. The trail exists to the eleventh street bridge and behind the Washington Navy Yard. Upon completion of Yards park in 2010, the Navy opened the riverwalk trail behind the Navy Yard to the public.

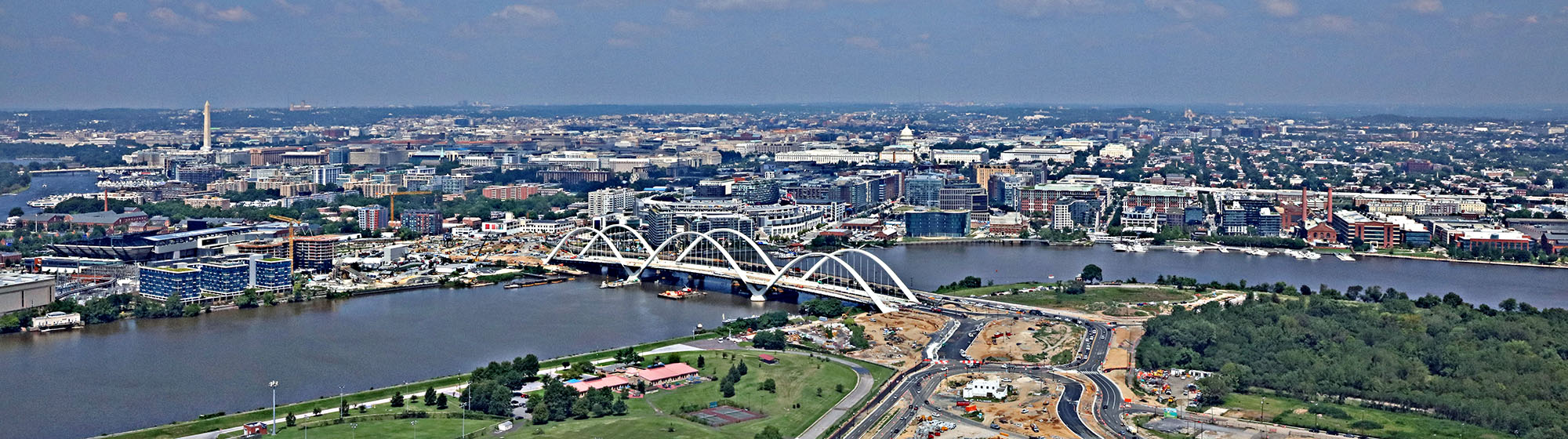
Capitol RiverFront, Aerial, Looking NW

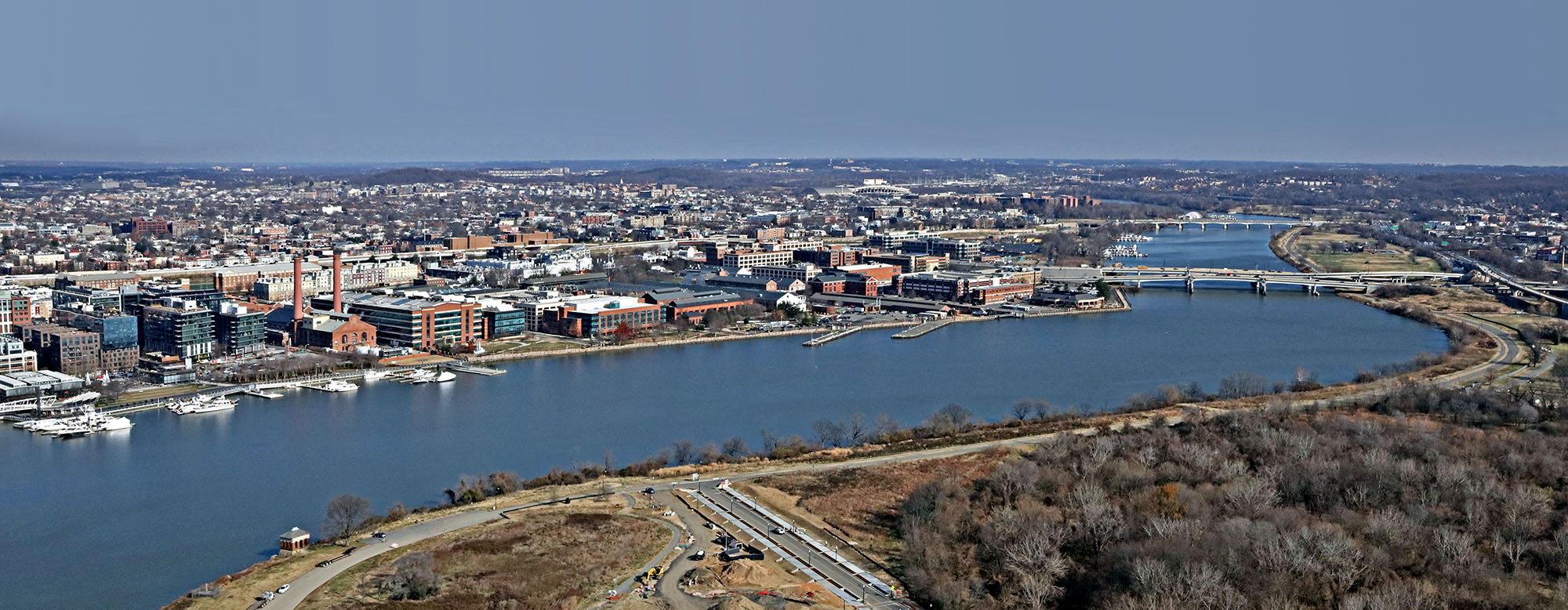
Capitol RiverFront

== History ==
Key points in the history of the Capitol Riverfront include:

- The Anacostia Waterfront Initiative was adopted by Mayor Anthony A. Williams and the District Council in 2003 to advance the river's clean-up and identify opportunities to increase access to the river and target new areas for development.
- The consolidation of Naval Sea Systems Command headquarters operations at the Navy Yard campus.
- Location of the U.S. Department of Transportation headquarters opened in 2007.
- The location of Nationals Park (opened 2008), the home of the Washington Nationals baseball team.

Historically, the Anacostia River, along the banks of the Capitol Riverfront, was once a deep water channel, burgeoning with natural resources and home to the Nacotchtank Indians. In 1791, L'Enfant designed the plan for Washington D.C. and, recognizing the assets of the Anacostia River, located the city's new commercial center and wharves there. In 1799, the Washington Navy Yard was established in the area. It was the nation's largest naval shipbuilding facility for several decades. Today, the Washington Navy Yard is the Navy's longest continuously operated Federal facility.

The Navy Yard was a bustling nautical center during the nineteenth century and played an integral role in the area's development. The lively wharf was a hub for jobs, serving ships with lumber and raw materials for the growing city. It also played a key role in defending the city from the British invasion in 1812. Surrounding the wharves was an extensive commercial district, light industrial businesses, and one of the city's most significant neighborhood communities. As the city and nation evolved, the Navy Yard changed from shipbuilding to producing finished ship products and weapons ammunition. By the mid-1940s, the Navy Yard and the expanded Annex area reached peak production with 26,000 employees in 132 buildings on 127 acres (0.51 km^{2}) of land.

However, during the last century of the city's growth, the river had deteriorated. The pollution of the river diminished its value as an asset to the city. After WWII, the Navy Yard consolidated its operations to a smaller campus, which slowed the economic and neighborhood activity of the area. Around this same time, the elevated portion of the Southeast-Southwest Freeway was completed, creating a physical barrier for access to the river. The combination of these and several other factors led to the river and the riverfront neighborhoods becoming neglected.
