= Kevin Atwater (singer) =

American singer-songwriter

- Born: Downers Grove, Illinois, US
- Genres: Indie; pop; folk
- Instrument: Voice
- Label: Mutual Friends
- Website: kevin-atwater.com

Kevin Atwater is an American singer-songwriter. He is known for his indie and dream pop music revolving around LGBTQ themes. Born in Downers Grove, Illinois, and later moving to New York City, Atwater first achieved popularity posting comedy and fan edits on TikTok, gaining around a million followers. Posting music on a second account, he first received attention after his single ''star tripping" went viral on the platform in 2022. Atwater's lyrics frequently recount events from his own life in a confessional style, with frequently melancholy stories that "[turn] niche life experiences into relatable hardship".

== Career ==
Atwater was born in Downers Grove, Illinois, and as a child learnt classical piano and clarinet; he also taught himself the guitar. Running a TikTok account that achieved popularity in the gay sub-community on the platform, he posted fan edits including "Nicki Minaj and Ariana Grande ordering McDonald's from Doja Cat and Lana Del Ray". Atwater began releasing music in 2020 with a single, "Freckles". On January 21, 2022, he published an EP entitled "retriever", which he recorded in his bedroom and produced himself – Daniela Pippin noted in Chalkpit that "at one point in the outro you can clearly hear the static in the audio as Kevin sings directly to the listener. You get the sense that you are listening to a voice message left on someone else’s phone, an incredibly intimate moment that you shouldn’t be part of." The same year, his single "star tripping" went viral on TikTok, gaining two million views and allowing him to grow his platform.

In 2023, Atwater released a second EP, Downers Grove and a year later, he collaborated with other artists to create a "reimagined" version of the record; August Ponthier is featured on the rerelease of "star tripping", and Ella Jane on "KEEP IT COOL!". Jackson Trotman of BVTack rated the original release of the album a 9/10, praising the lyric-writing throughout the writing, but noting that when listening through the album, its instrumentation felt "monotonous" and "very safe". On 7 March 2025, Atwater released his debut album, Achilles, featuring songs written over a period of several years. The album's first single, "the cage" was published a month before the entire release. With Achilles, Atwater performed a month-long headlining tour across the US, with subsequences in Canada and the United Kingdom.

In a 2022 interview with IntoMore, Atwater described his music as "folk with a queer twist", and mentioned Sufjan Stevens, Phoebe Bridgers, and Nick Drake's album Pink Moon as musical inspirations. Elsewhere, he has named Joni Mitchell, Adrianne Lenker, and Lomelda as influences. Atwater has been praised for his consistent clear diction and "flexible range", In particular, Atwater's lyrics writing has been commended: Noah Wade described it as "impressively concise, abbreviated, and illustrative." Atwater has been noted to use alternative guitar tunings, and writing songs in quintuple meter.

== Discography ==
=== Studio albums ===
Title	Details
Achilles	Released: March 7, 2025; Label: Mutual Friends
Blush Red	Released: July 10, 2026; Label: Mutual Friends

=== Extended plays ===
Title	Details
Retriever	Released: January 21, 2022; Label: Independent
Downers Grove	Released: April 26, 2023; Label: Mutual Friends
Downers Grove (Reimagined)	Released: June 12, 2024; Label: Mutual Friends

=== Singles ===
"Dispose"	2022	Retriever
"My Blood Is Your Blood"	2022	Non-album single
"Star Tripping"	2022	Downers Grove
"Christopher Street"	2022	Downers Grove
"Jacob Killed a Cat"	2023	Downers Grove
"Keep It Cool!"	2023	Downers Grove
"Why Did You Invite Me to Your Wedding"	2023	Non-album singles
"Swallow"	2024	Non-album singles
"Rotted Out with Flies"	2024	Non-album singles
"Ribcage"	2024	Non-album singles
"Ferry Beer"	2024	Achilles
"Huntley"	2024	Achilles
"Family Party"	2024	Achilles
"The Cage"	2025	Achilles
"My My My!"	2025	Non-album singles
"Know You"	2025	Blush Red
"But They Were Kissing"	2025	Blush Red
"Til August"	2026	Blush Red
"I'm not where you're at"	2026	Blush Red
"Up in flames"	2026	Blush Red
