= Caroline Kingsbury =

American pop musician

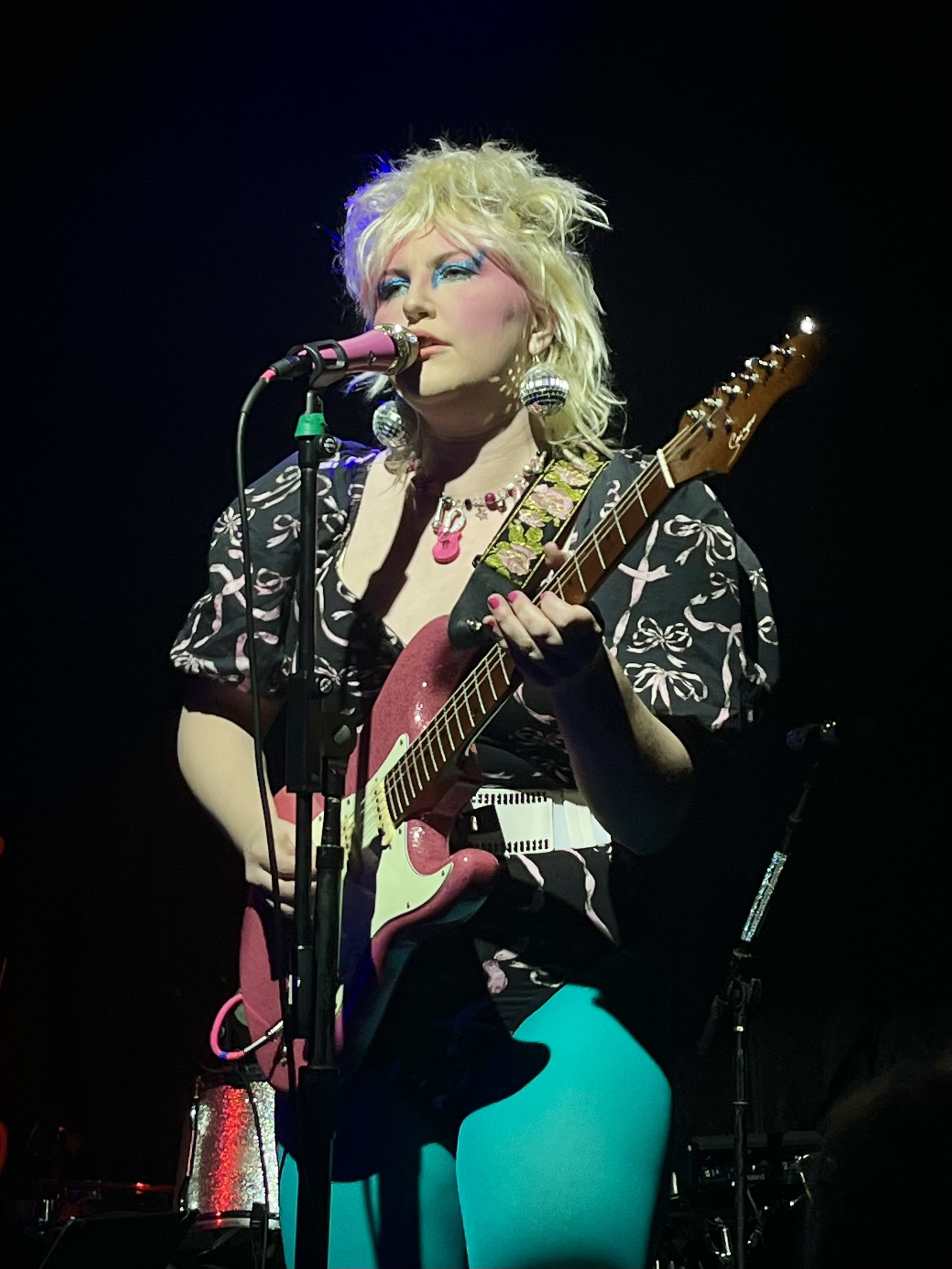
- Kingsbury in 2025

Background information
- Born: August 16, 1995 (age 31); Melbourne, Florida
- Genres: Pop; pop rock; rock
- Occupations: Singer; songwriter
- Instruments: Vocals; piano; guitar
- Years active: 2016–present
- Labels: Music Is Fun; Fortune Tellers

Caroline Kingsbury (born August 16, 1995) is an American pop musician from Melbourne, Florida.

== Early life and background ==
Kingsbury grew up in a conservative Christian household in Florida, where she first performed music as part of her church worship band. She has said that her early exposure to music was shaped by restrictions in her household; while artists such as the Beatles and Bob Dylan were permitted, contemporary popular music was discouraged.

Kingsbury is openly queer.

== Career ==
Kingsbury released her debut album in 2021 titled Heaven's Just a Flight via Fortune Tellers Records. Prior to the release, Kingsbury had released the singles "Fall in Love", "Hero", and "Lose". The album was ranked number 26 on Yardbarker's list of "The 50 Best Albums of 2021". In late 2024, Kingsbury released her first EP titled I Really Don't Care!" The EP was named one of "The 25 Best EPs of 2024" according to Atwood Magazine.

In April 2025, Kingsbury announced her second EP, Shock Treatment, scheduled for release in September 2025. The project includes the singles "Chocolate" and the title track, and explores themes of queer identity, relationships, and family estrangement. She debuted “Chocolate” live at the BMI Stage during Lollapalooza in Chicago in August 2025.

Kingsbury performed at Lollapalooza in 2025, her largest festival appearance to date. Kingsbury performed three sets during the 2025 Lollapalooza weekend, including her BMI Stage appearance, an acoustic performance at the Toyota Music Den, and an official aftershow at Schubas supporting Del Water Gap.

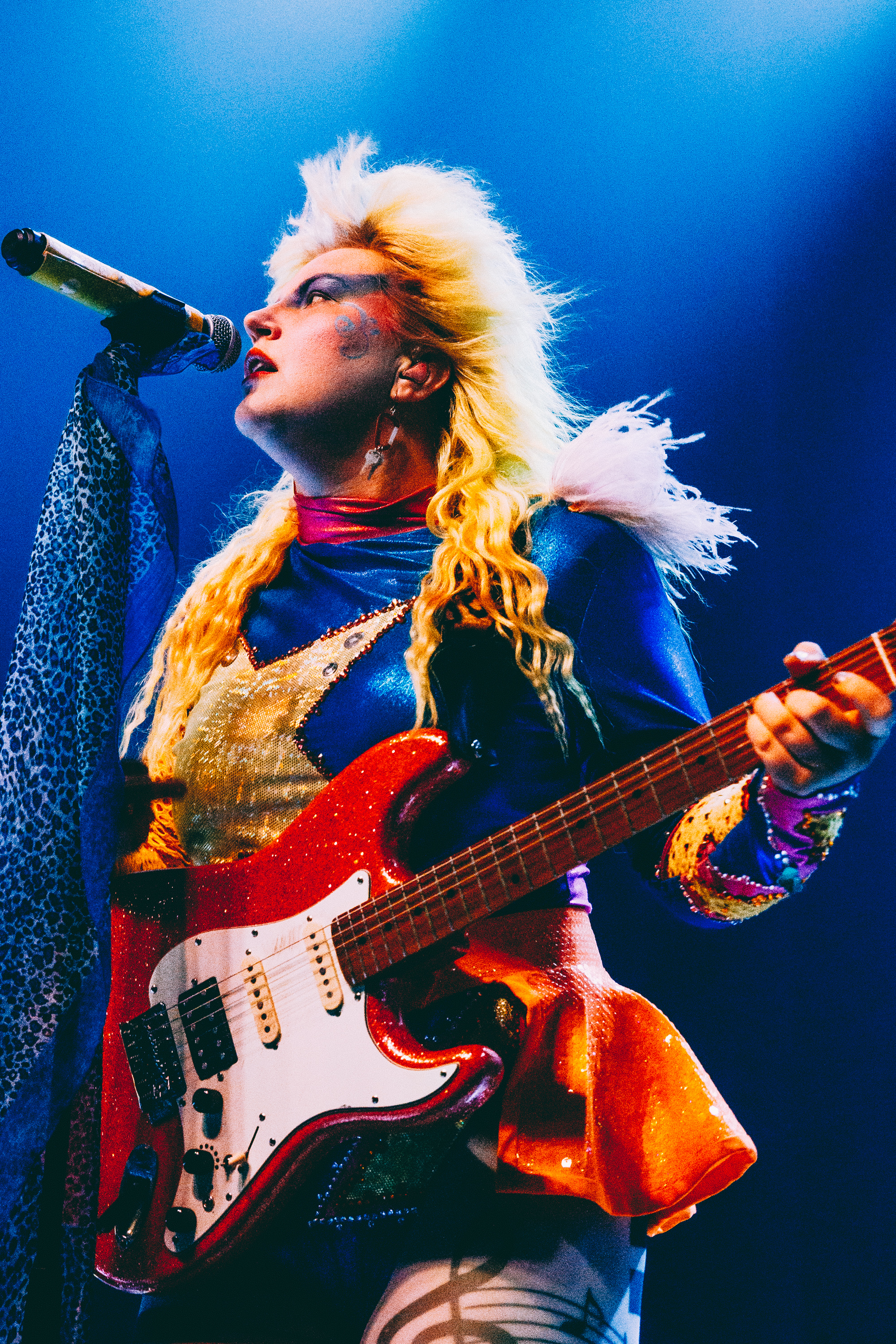
Caroline Kingsbury on the DC stop of her Shock Treatment Tour at The Atlantis in April 2026.

Following the release of Shock Treatment, she announced a co-headlining North American tour with pop artist MARIS, including a performance at the All Things Go music festival in Maryland. Kingsbury explained that the format would feature both solo performances and joint collaborations in a continuous two-hour set, intended as a more communal concert experience.

Her song "Kissing Someone Else" was used in Dispatch, an award-winning 2025 episodic adventure game developed and published by the American developer AdHoc Studio.

== Discography ==
Studio albums

- Heaven's Just a Flight (2021, Fortune Tellers)

EPs

- I Really Don't Care! (2024, Music Is Fun)
- Shock Treatment (2025, Music Is Fun)
