= Amuse (music company) =

Digital music distribution company

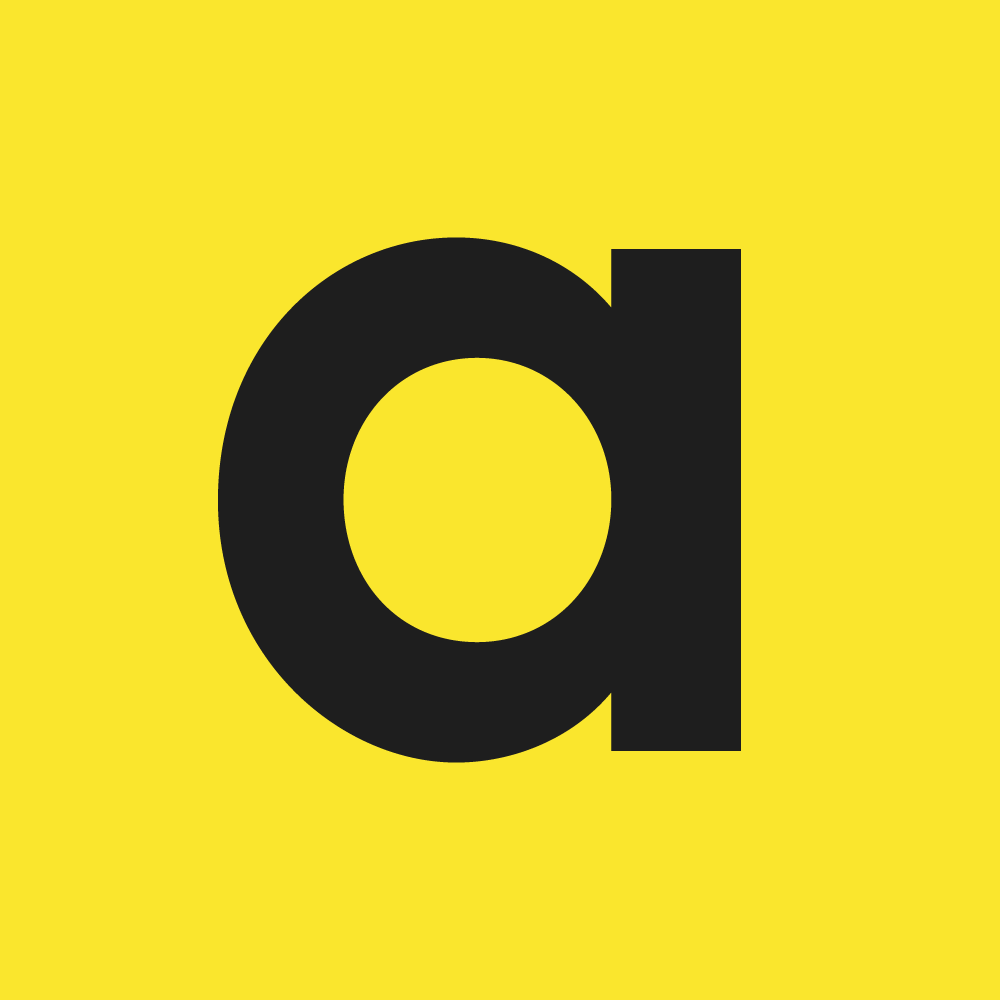
- Company type: Music company
- Industry: Music Industry
- Founded: 2015; 11 years ago in Stockholm, Sweden
- Founders: Diego Farias; Andreas Ahlenius; Christian Wilsson; Jimmy Brodd; Guy Parry
- Headquarters: Stockholm, Sweden
- Area served: Worldwide
- Key people: Giorgio D'Ambrosio, CEO
- Revenue: ▲US$24 million (2023)
- Website: amuse.io

Amuseio AB, doing business as Amuse, is a global music company offering digital music distribution, funding and artist services to artists and managements, enabling them to stay independent while growing their careers. The company was founded as a modern alternative to major record labels in 2015 in Stockholm, Sweden by entrepreneurs Diego Farias, Andreas Ahlenius, Christian Wilsson, Guy Parry, and Jimmy Brodd. Amuse is based in Stockholm, Sweden, with offices in London, UK and New York, US. In 2024, Giorgio D'Ambrosio was appointed interim CEO of the company.

== Business model ==
Amuse's proprietary technology platform uses the streaming data from digital music services to partner with independent artists with momentum. When the company discovers music it can help grow, Amuse's Artist & Label Services team can offer artists a tailor made licensing deal, including services like funding, artist marketing and rights management, in return of a revenue split. The licensing deal means that artists remain in control of master rights.

Amuse's self-service digital distribution service lets any self-releasing and independent artists release and monetize their music, through all major streaming services. Amuse offers three subscription tiers for self-service music distribution - Artist, Artist Plus and Professional - as well as connected services such as automated royalty advances, AI mastering and music performance insights.

== History ==
Amuse was founded in 2015 by Diego Farias, Andreas Ahlenius, Christian Wilsson, Guy Parry, and Jimmy Brodd, with the ambition to redefine artist discovery and record label deals. The first Amuse iOS and Android digital distribution application was released in March 2017, allowing anyone to self-release and manage their music catalog straight from their smartphone. In June 2017, American rapper, singer, songwriter, DJ, record producer, voice actor and philanthropist will.i.am joined the company's list of co-founders. Later on in May 2018 Amuse raised $15,5M USD in series A funding round led by venture capital firms Lakestar and Raine Ventures.

In April 2019 the company launched Fast Forward - an automated royalty advance service for self-releasing artists.

In the end of 2018, Lil Nas X uploaded his song Old Town Road through Amuse. According to former CEO Diego Farias, he had previously uploaded several tracks which had not gained much attention. However, in the beginning of 2019 the company could see, through their algorithms, that Old Town Road was doing extremely well, and so they offered the artist a deal. Lil Nas X later on chose to sign a deal with Columbia Records. The song Old Town Road, featuring Billy Ray Cyrus, ended up becoming one of the most prized songs in the history of Billboard Hot 100, as it spent record-breaking 19 weeks at No.1.

By 2023, Amuse was a top 5 DIY digital music distribution service worldwide, in terms of release volume. They also had five of the ten most streamed songs on Spotify in Sweden and launched Music Insights, providing distribution users with granular statistics about their music performance, including user-generated content from YouTube and TikTok. "Master Your Music", a new AI release mastering service, was launched in July 2023 through a collaboration with the Norwegian startup Masterchannel, used by artists like Ane Brun and Skinny Days (producers for Tiësto, Alan Walker and Seeb).

== Operations ==
Amuse has two main operations - digital music distribution and licensing of music. Their offering stretches across a range of services for independent artists, from an open digital music distribution platform to artist services, marketing and funding.

Amuse's label works with a selection of licensed artists, like US indie pop/rock acts Yot Club, Emei, The Walters, Penelope Scott, Stela Cole, Vundabar, Hotel Ugly, Bedroom and Mind's Eye, UK Drill phenomena Fumez the Engineer, Canadian rap/R&B artist 80purppp and Turkish chill trap artist Serhat Durmus. In early 2024, Amuse celebrated that Hotel Ugly and Yot Club had both surpassed 1 billion streams during their partnership with Amuse. The label has received a series of US, Canadian and UK Platinum certifications for licensed artists, as well as US, Canadian and UK Gold certifications.

The data-driven royalty advance service Fast Forward that was officially launched in April 2019, utilises machine learning to calculate and offer users up to six months of their upcoming royalties through the Amuse smartphone application. The service is very scalable and able to offer artists advances between US$10 up to thousands of USD.

== Financials ==
Amuseio AB is based in Sweden and is required to release their financials. In 2023 they had a gross revenue of $24M USD and made $1.2M USD loss.

== Associated artists ==
- Yot Club
- Vundabar
- The Walters
- Emei
- Stela Cole
- 80purppp
- Melvitto
- Lil Nas X
- Yasin
- Lil Tecca
- Kite
- Asme
- Håkan Hellström
- 1.Cuz
- Bedroom
- Mind's Eye
- Julie
- Sad And Insane
- Ryan Mack
- Serhat Durmus
- Sarettii
- yuji
- awfultune
- Fumez the Engineer
- Skinny Atlas
- ChilledCow
- Shakka
- Lil Chainz
- Georgia Ku
- Albin Myers
- Fricky
- Moonica Mac
- Sean Slick
