= I Die Where You Begin =

Studio album by Stela Cole
- Released: March 14, 2025 (Note: Originally released on March 14, 2025,)
- Genre: pop
- Length: 48:00
- Label: Stelavision

Stela Cole chronology
Woman of the Hour (2020)	I Die Where You Begin (2025)

Singles from I Die Where You Begin
- 1. "Blue Moon"; 2. "Stereoqueen"; 3. "God Loves You"

I Die Where You Begin is the debut album by American singer songwriter Stela Cole, released on March 14, 2025. The album was preceded by an EP, IDWYB The Prequel in 2024, Cole's first release under her independent record label, Stelavison after she departed from Ultra Records.

== Background information ==
In 2023 Cole split from her record deal with Ultra Records and later started her own self-funded record label, Stelavsion, distributed by Amuseio AB.

The first single Cole released on her independent record label was "Die Hard", released in January 2024. In February Cole released "Midnight Killer". In March Cole released "Blood Orange Wine". In April Cole released "Feel It Again". In June Cole released "Candyland". These singles were included in Cole's first EP as an independent artist, IDWYB The Prequel, released in June. The EP also included one additional single, "Now or Nevermind". Accompanying these was a series of music videos, directed by Eliot Lee and Maya Sassoon and features Noah Gonzalez as the costar.

In November 2024 Cole released "Blue Moon". In January 2025 Cole released "God Loves You". In February Cole released "Stereoqueen" the final single from her upcoming album.

Following the release of "Stereoqueen" Cole announced the title of her debut album I Die Where You Begin, as well as the track list for the album. The album was subsequently made available for pre save on Spotify with an initial release date of March 14, 2025. Cole also made the vinyl record for the album available for pre order. The vinyl included three bonus tracks that were originally not available on streaming, "Famous Last Words", "Exit Wound" and "Rose Colored Lover". However, the album was rereleased on April 18, 2025 with the three bonus tracks on all streaming services.

Cole cites Fleetwood Mac, Arctic Monkeys, Eagles, and Tame Impala as her main inspirations for this era in her career.

== Themes and composition ==
Cole describes the album as a "daunting cycle of broken relationships". The three songs off of the initial EP and later album, "Die Hard", "Midnight Killer" and "Blood Orange Wine" are an autobiographical about rediscovery and heartbreak that Cole experienced. "Die Hard" touches on getting stuck in a cycle of bad habits. "Blood Orange Wine" is an upbeat indie pop song, filled with classical arrangements. The song "Loverspell" ends in a 70's inspired guitar solo to finish the song out. The 70's influence was most evident in the song "Stereoqueen" featuring the line "dancing like it's '73". Cole describes the song as "the empowering phase" of the album.

Cole pulled from many genres of music when composing the album including electropop, rock, blues and western.

== Track listing ==
I Die Where You Begin track listing
No.	Title	Writer(s)	Producer	Length
1.	"Blue Moon"	Aaron Burton; Matt Crawford; Elsa Curran; Hollyn Shadinger	Crawford	3:17
2.	"Stereoqueen"	Skylar Capri; Rob Cohen; Mark Evans; Shadinger; Blake Mares	David Burris; Evans	3:43
3.	"God Loves You"	Evans; Shadinger	Evans	2:39
4.	"Famous Last Words"	Ferras Alquaisi; Kevin Hickey; Shadinger; Jaro Omar	Burris; zhone	2:24
5.	"Loverspell"	Jake Fine; Shadinger; Rami Jrade	Fine	2:54
6.	"Stay Mad"	Curran; Zack Djurich; Shadinger; Ariana Wong	Djurich; Wong	2:45
7.	"Slow Dance"	Burton; Crawford; Curran; Shadinger	Crawford	2:43
8.	"Bunny Love"	Evans; Shadinger; Taylor Foley	Evans	3:06
9.	"Exit Wound"	Burris; Curran; Shadinger	Burris	3:20
10.	"Blood Orange Wine"	Curran; Evans; Shadinger	Evans	2:46
11.	"Midnight Killer"	Burris; Evalyn Colleen; Shadinger	Burris	2:36
12.	"Candyland"	Autumn Buysee; Evans; Shadinger	Evans	2:46
13.	"Feel It Again"	Shadinger; Nick Lopez; Erik Ron	Burris; Ron	3:06
14.	"Now Or Nevermind"	Shadinger; Jrade; Simon Oscroft	Oscroft	3:35
15.	"Die Hard"	Ella Boh; Burris; Shadinger; Midi Jones; Loxe	Burris; Jones; Loxe	2:59
16.	"Rose Colored Lover"	Curran; Austen Healy; Shadinger	Burris; Healy	4:11
Total length:				48:00
