= Samm Henshaw =

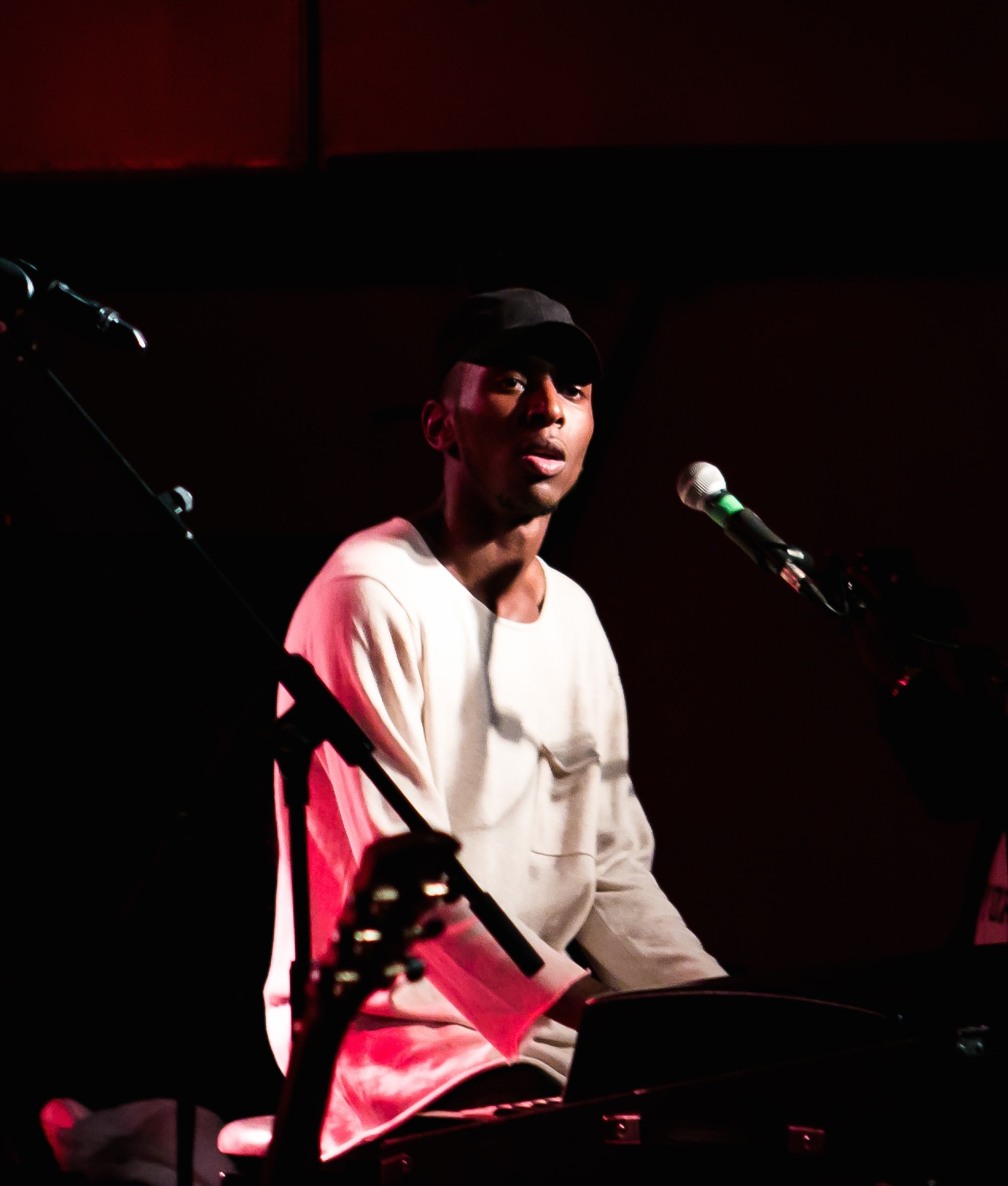

Background information
- Also known as: Samm Henshaw
- Born: Iniabasi Samuel Henshaw; 22 February 1994 (age 32); London, England
- Genres: Soul; R&B; pop
- Occupations: Singer; songwriter; producer
- Instruments: Vocals; guitar; keyboards; drums
- Years active: 2013–present
- Labels: Dorm Seven; Columbia
- Website: sammhenshaw.com

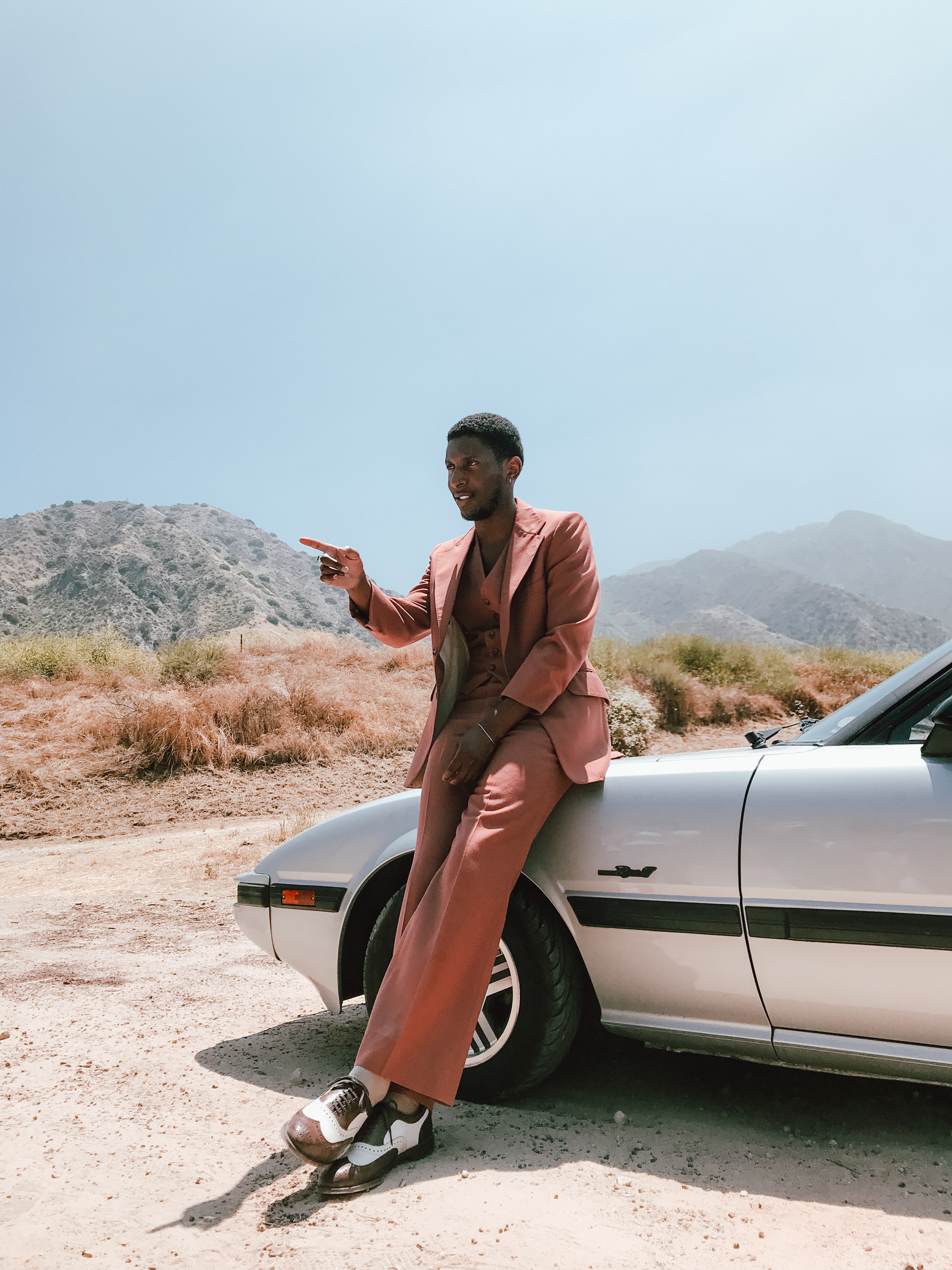
Henshaw on the set of his music video "The World Is Mine".

Iniabasi Samuel Henshaw, professionally known as Samm Henshaw (born 22 February 1994), is an English singer, songwriter, and record producer. Henshaw garnered mainstream radio support from BBC Radio 1 and was chosen by James Bay, Chance the Rapper, and Allen Stone for tour support. His 2019 single The World Is Mine was used as the theme music for Amazon Studios' TV adaptation of Alex Rider, based on the popular teen book series by Anthony Horowitz. Samm's debut album, Untidy Soul, was released on 28 January 2022.

== Early life ==
Henshaw was born in London, England, and was raised by Nigerian parents in South London.

Henshaw spent his secondary years at Cleeve Park School, then pursued a popular music performance degree at Southampton Solent.

== Career ==
=== 2014–2015: Debut EP The Sound Experiment ===
Henshaw's debut EP, The Sound Experiment, was released in 2015 and featured production and songwriting input from Wayne Hector and Fred Cox, amongst others.

=== 2016-2021: The Sound Experiment 2 and Singles ===
Henshaw's second EP, The Sound Experiment 2, was released in the summer of 2016. Henshaw released music videos for "Our Love" and "Night Calls", promotional singles from The Sound Experiment 2. Beginning in 2018, Henshaw released a series of non-album singles, including "How Does It Feel?", "Broke", "Doubt" (feat. Wretch 32), "Church" (feat. EarthGang), "The World Is Mine (Whole World Ahead)", "Only One to Blame", "Change For Me" with Brasstracks, and "All Good". "Church" and "Broke" have since become some of Henshaw's biggest songs.

=== 2022: Untidy Soul ===
After releasing the singles Still Broke (featuring Keyon Harrold), Grow, and Chicken Wings, Henshaw released his debut album Untidy Soul. Critics stated the album was based on "rootsy, old-school soul, 90s hip-hop, bluesy jazz and gospel," with Henshaw calling it "a reflection of his own 'scatterbrain", each song telling a different story.

=== 2024-Present: for someone, somewhere, who isn't us and It Could Be Worse. ===
After his Untidy Soul tour in 2022 and 2023, Henshaw released a mini-album on 2 August 2024 entitled for someone, somewhere, who isn't us, focusing on themes of on burnout and creative difficulties he had in the wake of Untidy Soul. An accompanying short film and documentary was released on YouTube on 27 September 2024.

Henshaw announced his second studio album, It Could Be Worse, on October 16, 2025, followed by the release of the singles "Get Back" and "Float". It was later revealed to be a vinyl-exclusive album. Following the release of the vinyl album, the single "Hair Down" was released on streaming services, and the album was released digitally on January 19, 2026.

== Artistry ==
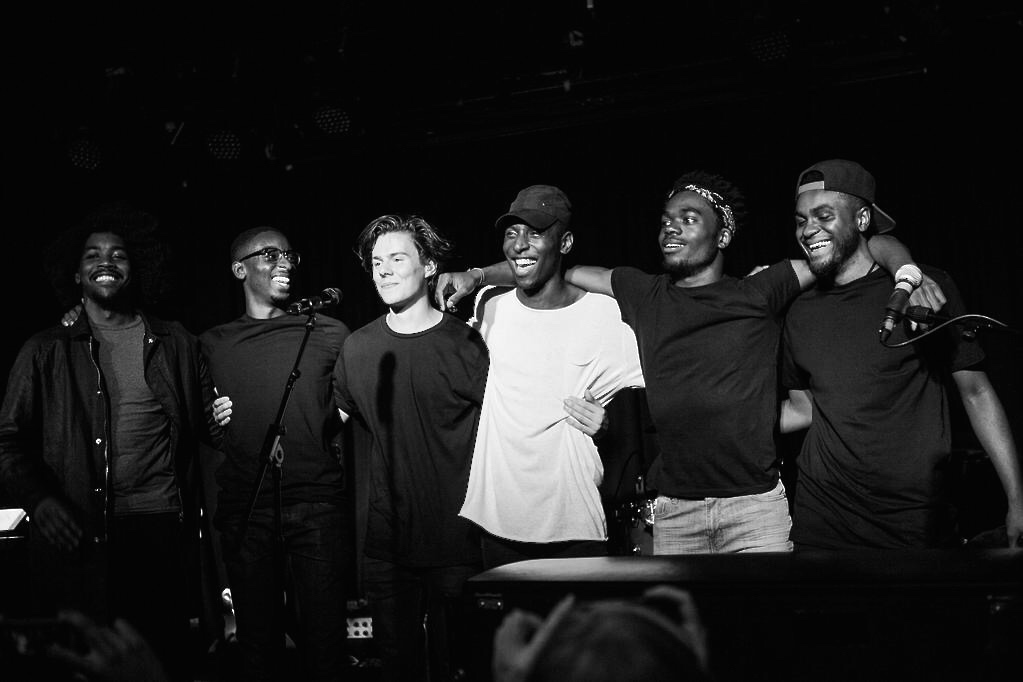
Henshaw with The Sound Experiment band, London, 22 June 2015.

Alongside gospel artists Helen Baylor, Fred Hammond, Israel Houghton, and Alvin Slaughter, Henshaw is said to have spent his childhood devouring mainstream pop music, from Stevie Wonder and Michael Jackson to Usher and N*Sync. More recently, Henshaw identifies his biggest vocal inspirations as D’Angelo, Paolo Nutini, and Lauryn Hill, and finds songwriting inspiration in Grammy award winner Frank Ocean.

== Tours ==
Supporting

- James Bay – Chaos and the Calm Tour (2015)
- Tori Kelly – Where I Belong Tour (2016)
- Chance the Rapper – Magnificent Coloring World Tour (2016)
- Allen Stone – Building Balance Tour (2020)

== Discography ==
=== Studio albums ===
Title	Details
Untidy Soul	Released: 28 January 2022; Label: Dorm Seven; Format: Digital download, vinyl
It Could Be Worse	Released: 19 January 2026; Label: Dorm Seven; Format: Digital download, vinyl

=== Extended plays ===
Title	Details
The Sound Experiment	Released: 25 September 2015; Label: Columbia; Format: Digital download
The Sound Experiment 2	Released: 15 July 2016; Label: Columbia; Format: Digital download
For Someone, Somewhere, Who Isn't Us.	Released: 2 August 2024; Label: Dorm Seven; Format: Digital download

=== Singles ===
- 2018: "How Does It Feel?"
- 2018: "Broke"
- 2018: "Doubt" (feat. Wretch 32)
- 2019: "Church" (feat. EarthGang)
- 2019: "The World Is Mine"
- 2019: "Only One to Blame"
- 2020: "Change for Me" (with Brasstracks)
- 2020: "All Good"
- 2021: "Still Broke" (feat. Keyon Harrold)
- 2021: "Grow"
- 2021: "Chicken Wings"
- 2022: "Pull Up" (Smoko Ono featuring Samm Henshaw)
- 2023: "Barcelona" (Kota the Friend featuring Samm Henshaw)
- 2023: "Jumoké"
- 2024: "Serena" (Adi Oasis featuring Samm Henshaw)
- 2024: "Troubled Ones"
- 2024: "If It's Not With You" (Beka featuring Samm Henshaw)
- 2024: "Fade" (featuring Kirby)
- 2025: "Find My Love" (featuring Tori Kelly)
- 2025: "Get Back"
- 2025: "Float"
- 2026: "Hair Down"

=== Guest appearances ===
Title	Year	Other artist(s)	Album	Credits
"Don't Worry"	2016	Tom Prior	The Sunday Scene	Background vocals
"Good Morning"	2017	Wretch 32	FR32	Featured artist, songwriter
"Unfinished Sympathy"	2017	Pete Tong, Heritage Orchestra, Jules Buckley	Ibiza Classics	Featured artist, vocals
"Rest"	2019	Half Alive	Now, Not Yet	Featured artist, songwriter
"Rise"	2019	N/A	Godfather of Harlem soundtrack	Featured artist, songwriter
"Change For Me"	2020	Brasstracks	Golden Ticket	Featured artist, songwriter
"Breakup Season"	2021	Maya Delilah	Breakup Season (feat. Samm Henshaw)	Featured artist, songwriter
