= Conditions of a Punk =

Studio album by Half Alive
- Released: December 2, 2022
- Length: 55:23
- Label: RCA
- Producers: Baird; Boyco; David Pramik; Ethan Gruska; Half Alive; John Hill; Jonah Shy; Mike Crossey; Nick Sanborn; Noah Conrad; Ojivolta; Ryan Raines; Zack Skelton

Half Alive chronology
Give Me Your Shoulders, Pt. 1 (2022)	Conditions of a Punk (2022)	Persona (2024)

Singles from Conditions of a Punk
- 1. "What's Wrong" Released: March 31, 2021; 2. "Summerland" Released: July 23, 2021; 3. "Make of It" Released: September 16, 2021; 4. "Hot Tea" Released: November 19, 2021; 5. "Move Me" Released: February 11, 2022; 6. "Did I Make You Up?" Released: October 13, 2022; 7. "High Up" Released: November 11, 2022; 8. "Nobody" Released: December 2, 2022

Conditions of a Punk is the second studio album by American band Half Alive, released on December 2, 2022, via RCA Records. It was preceded by the singles "What's Wrong", "Summerland", "Make of It", "Hot Tea", "Move Me", "Did I Make You Up?", and "High Up".

== Background ==
Starting in early 2021, Half Alive began promotion of their planned sophomore record, Give Me Your Shoulders, which was announced as a two part album. Five singles were released before the release of the first part, Give Me Your Shoulders, Pt. 1, on February 11, 2022.

On September 12, 2022, the band announced the cancellation of Give Me Your Shoulders, Pt. 2 via the release of a spoken word track titled "Night Swims (poem)". On October 13, the first single for the new album, "Did I Make You Up?", was released alongside the official announcement of Conditions of a Punk. A release date of December 2 was announced. The album's track list, which includes every track from Give Me Your Shoulders, Pt. 1, was announced on October 20. The day before the album was released, the band announced the Conditions Of A Punk Tour that would take place in North America and the UK in 2023.

According to Josh Taylor, the album marks the first time that the band allowed themselves to write about the topic of love. Comparing it to their first album, Now, Not Yet is more cerebral, speaking about a subject (e.g. trust or rest), while Conditions of a Punk is more emotional with the band now singing to a subject instead. The religious undertones seen in the former are present in the latter as well, described as being "about a person and God in the same breath." The album title derives from Taylor's personal experiences, who agrees with his past characterization as a "punk" from friends in the egotistical, self-serving connotation of the word. The songs are therefore informed by a decade of "unlearning what [he] thought Love was", depicting the death of the ego and the punk via the breaking and mending of a heart.

== Promotion ==
=== Singles ===
On March 17, 2021, the band started teasing snippets of upcoming music which would be their first major release since 2019. It was then revealed on March 24, 2021, that the lead single, "What's Wrong", would be released on March 31.

On July 15, 2021, the band started teasing more new music with different videos with one of the videos stating "•welcome to the summer era". It was then revealed on July 21, 2021, that the next single, "Summerland", would be released on July 23. The music video was released on July 30, 2021.

On September 8, 2021, the band hinted at another single with a video along with a caption stating "something for you / on the deepest end. / nearly ready to surface..". It was revealed on September 10, 2021, that the next single, "Make of It", will be released on September 16.

The next single, "Hot Tea", was released on November 19, 2021, with another single, "Move Me", being released on February 11, 2022. All 5 singles were originally supposed to be a part of the 2-part album "Give Me Your Shoulders". Part 2 was then canceled due to doing "something beyond it".

On September 17, 2022, the band started teasing their next single, "Did I Make You Up?", in the form of TikToks and short videos. "Did I Make You Up?" was then released on October 13, 2022. The next single, "High Up", was then released on November 11, 2022.

On November 30, 2022, the band revealed that the final single, "Nobody", would be releasing on December 2, 2022, the same day as the album.

=== TV Performances ===
On June 1, 2021, the band performed "What's Wrong" on Jimmy Kimmel Live!.

=== Tour ===
On December 1, 2022, the band announced the Conditions Of A Punk Tour with 19 stops across the United Kingdom & Europe, and 23 stops across North America. The band was joined by WizTheMc on all UK and Europe dates and Tessa Violet and Dev Lemons on all North America dates. Due to high demand, a second Chicago date was added and the venue for Charlotte got upgraded from The Underground to The Fillmore Charlotte.

On June 13, 2023, the band announced a second United States leg for the Conditions Of A Punk Tour happening in Fall 2023 with 18 dates. The band was joined by Thomas Headon on all dates except for the October 18 show at House of Blues in Anaheim, which was opened by Alix Page. On August 9, 2023, the band announced 3 dates in Texas, a part of the second US leg, along with 5 stops across Mexico, Australia, and New Zealand. The opening act for those dates are to be announced.

The tour began on February 16, 2023, at the O2 Academy 2 in Birmingham and ended on November 2, 2023, at Sydney's The Metro.

== Track listing ==
All tracks are written by Josh Taylor, Brett Kramer, and J Tyler Johnson; additional writers are as indicated.

Conditions of a Punk track listing
No.	Title	Writer(s)	Producer(s)	Length
1.	"Conditions of a Punk"	Gabe Reali; Ryan Raines	Boyco; Ryan Raines	3:36
2.	"Summerland"	Skyler Stonestreet; Mark Williams; Raul Cubina	Ojivolta; Half Alive^{[a]}	3:49
3.	"Brighton"		Mike Crossey	3:05
4.	"High Up"		Ethan Gruska	3:29
5.	"Hot Tea"	Cubina; David Pramik	Pramik	2:55
6.	"Did I Make You Up?"	Scott Harris; Williams; Cubina	Ojivolta	2:29
7.	"Nobody"	Jonah Shy	Gruska; Shy	3:26
8.	"Move Me"	Noah Conrad	Conrad	3:37
9.	"Yosemite"		Half Alive	2:49
10.	"Never Been Better" (featuring Orla Gartland)	Orla Gartland; Sasha Alex Sloan; Zack Skelton	John Hill	3:08
11.	"Back Around"	Pramik; Williams; Cubina; Andrew Jackson	Pramik	3:43
12.	"Everything Machine"		Hill	3:17
13.	"What's Wrong"	Williams; Cubina	Ojivolta; Half Alive^{[a]}	2:56
14.	"Call Back"	Baird Acheson	Baird; Half Alive	2:42
15.	"I'll Stop"	Shy	Gruska; Shy	3:14
16.	"Make of It"	Williams; Cubina	Ojivolta; Half Alive	2:35
17.	"Bad Thoughts"	Stonestreet; Williams; Cubina	Hill; Nick Sanborn	2:11
18.	"Lost"	Spencer Stewart	Half Alive	2:22
Total length:				55:23

Note

- ^{^[a]} signifies an additional producer

== Personnel ==
Half Alive

- Josh Taylor – vocals (all tracks), engineering (track 18)
- Brett Kramer – drums (all tracks), engineering (18)
- J. Tyler Johnson – bass guitar (all tracks), engineering (18)

Additional musicians

- Mark Williams – programming (tracks 2, 6, 13, 16)
- Raul Cubina – programming (2, 6, 13, 16)
- Emiko Bankson – strings (4, 15)
- Rachel Kramer – chorus master (5), background vocals (7)
- Alexa Cappelli – choir (5)
- Gregory Fletcher – choir (5)
- Sophia James – choir (5)
- VJ Rosales – choir (5)

Technical

- Dale Becker – mastering
- Joe LaPorta – mastering (13)
- Lars Stalfors – mixing (1, 14, 18)
- Tom Elmhirst – mixing (2, 8)
- Mike Crossey – mixing (3)
- Geoff Swan – mixing (4, 7, 9, 10)
- Neal Pogue – mixing (5, 11, 16)
- Manny Marroquin – mixing (6, 15, 17)
- Rob Cohen – mixing (12)
- Jon Castelli – mixing (13)
- Jonny Bell – engineering, recording (15)
- Connor Hedge – engineering assistance
- Katie Harvey – engineering assistance
- Noah McCorkle – engineering assistance
- Fili Filizzola – engineering assistance (2, 5, 8, 11, 12, 16)
- Hector Vega – engineering assistance (2, 5, 8, 11, 12, 16)
- Matthew Scatchell – engineering assistance (2, 8)
- Chris Galland – engineering assistance (6, 15, 17)
- Jeremie Inhaber – engineering assistance (6, 15, 17)
- Robin Florent – engineering assistance (6, 15, 17)
- Ingmar Carlson – engineering assistance (13)
- Ryan Nasci – engineering assistance (13)
