= Persona (Half Alive album) =

2024 album by Half Alive

Studio album by Half Alive
- Released: November 15, 2024
- Length: 31:49
- Label: Virgin
- Producers: Half Alive; Tommy King

Half Alive chronology
Conditions of a Punk (2022)	Persona (2024)	Persona (Extended) (2025)

Singles from Persona
- 1. "Sophie's House" Released: September 19, 2024; 2. "Automatic" Released: October 11, 2024; 3. "Songs" Released: November 1, 2024; 4. "All My Love" Released: November 15, 2024

Persona is the third studio album by the American rock band Half Alive, released on November 15, 2024, via Virgin. It was preceded by the singles "Sophie's House", "Automatic", and "Songs".

== Background ==
Development and production for Half Alive's third studio album began in early 2024. According to lead singer Josh Taylor, "When starting the writing process for this album, we intentionally kept things broad, painting with a wide brush. [And] ideas emerged that we kept throughout the entire record - to boil every song down to its most essential elements." Regarding the scope and direction of the album, Taylor said "Persona has allowed us to lean into big choices while also learning a valuable lesson in editing. Anything that didn't contribute to telling a story was left on the cutting room floor and we couldn't be more proud of this album. It is truly the best version of [sic] half•alive and we're so happy these songs are now yours."

== Promotion ==
On September 19, the band announced the name and release date of their third studio album, along with dropping the single "Sophie's House", which was accompanied by a music video filmed in Los Angeles featuring choreography "inspired by MGM-style musicals like West Side Story". Regarding the song, Taylor commented:

Lyrically the song explores the years of life that feel the most free— under your parent’s roof, summer break from high school.. autonomy before any real responsibility kicks in. It’s in that time that we don’t recognize how much freedom there is until it’s gone and we’re reflecting on it; as written in the lyric ‘wish that I could see I’m having the time of my life when I’m having the time of my life’. While the song doesn’t just bask in nostalgia, it begs the question: Can you turn nostalgia of the past into a wonder for the present?

On October 11, the band dropped another single from the album, "Automatic", with another accompanying music video. The video, directed by Taylor himself, features the two 'mascots' of the album, Sonny and Cher.

On November 8, Half Alive released a third single, "Songs", featuring American bedroom pop artist Jordana. Taylor described the song as "...our attempt to put that feeling in a bottle. Whether you’re singing along with the band or just listening, it all creates harmony. Lyrics like ‘Let it be infinite while it lasts’ let us see the eternal leaking into the present."

On November 15, the same day as the album release, Half Alive announced the track "All My Love" as its own single with a music video uploaded to YouTube the same day. The music video was filmed entirely with Ray-Ban Meta smart glasses as part of a collaboration with Meta. According to Taylor, the song is "...poking at the idea that worth is downstream from work."

== Release ==
Half Alive released Persona on November 15, 2024. The album's 11 tracks included the three pre-release singles and "All My Love", which was released as a single the same day.

The album's cover art, photographed by Ryo Sato, features Sonny and Cher, the puppet mascots who had previously appeared in the music video for the single "Automatic". The characters were designed by Michael Brennan.

== Reception ==
The album was generally received favorably among critics. Lex Kelly described the album as being "full of energetic and emotional songs, demonstrating the band’s growth while also cementing its style within the alternative genre." Ashlee Thompson of The Breeze notes how "lead singer Josh Taylor, drummer Brett Kramer and bassist J. Tyler Johnson came together to create an album juxtaposing [sic] dancey, rock-like beats with lyrics that make you question your world." In a review for Wildfire Music, Hannah Means-Shannon said that the album "challenges perception" and wrote "Throughout 11 tracks, half•alive explores 'what it means to be human', including how do personalities develop and how does the outside world perceive you?" Olivia Powell of Unclear magazine observed that the album "embodies...humanity" and praised the band's ability to integrate slower, more thoughtful songs alongside their up-tempo tracks.

== Tour ==
In December 2024, Half Alive announced an international tour for the Persona album, with concerts in the United States, Canada, Western Europe, the United Kingdom, and Australia. A total of 39 concerts were announced. The Walters also performed with Half Alive on select concerts. Regarding the tour, Josh Taylor shared "I get warm, soothing chills down my spine when I’m around people singing in harmony. ...We’re looking forward to feeling that at the shows next year. The high intensity, the introspection, the swaying, the absorbing and [sic] participating- it’s all creating a harmony."

== Track listing ==
All tracks are written by Josh Taylor, Brett Kramer, and J. Tyler Johnson; additional writers are as indicated.

Persona track listing
No.	Title	Writer(s)	Producer(s)	Length
1.	"Persona"		Half Alive; Tommy King	0:32
2.	"Sophie's House"	Matt Castellenos; Tommy King; Emma Rosen	Tommy King	4:15
3.	"Automatic"	Nate Campany; Tommy King; Skyler Stonestreet	Mike Crossey	3:13
4.	"People"	Tommy King; Caroline Pennel	Ethan Gruska	3:26
5.	"Bleed It Out"	James Flannigan; Emma Rosen	Half Alive; Tommy King	2:45
6.	"Long Drive" (featuring Kacy Hill)	Jake LiBassi; Tommy King; Sarah Troy	Half Alive; Tommy King	3:57
7.	"Lie, Lie"	David Pramik; Skyler Stonestreet	Half Alive; Tommy King	2:32
8.	"All My Love"	Tommy King; Emma Rosen; Merrick Winter	Half Alive; Tommy King	2:08
9.	"The Point"	Eren Cannata; Justin Tranter	Half Alive; Tommy King	2:43
10.	"Songs" (featuring Jordana)	Tommy King; Jonah Shy; Casey Smith	Half Alive; Tommy King	3:20
11.	"Thank You"	James Alan; Michael Coleman	David Pramik	2:58
Total length:				31:49

Note

- ^{^[a]} signifies an additional producer

== Personnel ==
=== Half Alive ===
- Brett Kramer – drums
- Josh Taylor – vocals
- J. Tyler Johnson – bass guitar

=== Production and engineering ===
- Tommy King – producer
