= Shut Up My Moms Calling =

2020 song by Hotel Ugly

Single by Hotel Ugly

from the album The Ugly EP
- Released: February 10, 2020; September 14, 2022 (re-release)
- Recorded: 2020
- Genre: Indie pop; R&B; bedroom pop
- Length: 4:23
- Label: Self-released
- Songwriters: Christopher Fiscella; Michael Fiscella
- Producer: Hotel Ugly

Hotel Ugly singles chronology
"Shut Up My Moms Calling" (2020)	"2ugly" (2020)

Music video
- "Shut Up My Moms Calling" on YouTube

"Shut Up My Moms Calling" is a song by American indie pop duo (Note: Hotel Ugly was initially a duo composed of brothers Christopher and Michael Fiscella when "Shut Up My Moms Calling" was released. However, as of February 2024, Hotel Ugly is listed as a solo project of Michael.) Hotel Ugly, self-released on February 10, 2020, as the lead single from their extended play (EP), The Ugly EP (2020). In 2022, the song gained popularity on TikTok, and has since appeared on many charts around the world, peaking at number 68 on the Billboard Hot 100 and #36 on the UK Singles Chart in early 2023. "Shut Up My Moms Calling" was re-released as a single on September 14, 2022 to coincide with this, along with a sped-up version.

== Background and composition ==
"Shut Up My Moms Calling" would be re-released on September 14, 2022, alongside with a sped-up version. The song's lyrics center around the point of view of someone who is struggling to keep a romantic relationship afloat, and the narrator is constantly asking their partner to "come home".

== Commercial performance ==
The song became a sleeper hit in mid-late-2022 thanks to its frequent use on TikTok, mainly a sped-up version of it. The song entered the Billboard Hot 100 the week of January 14, 2023, at number 96, and peaked at number 68. On the UK Singles Chart, "Shut Up My Moms Calling" was a top-40 hit, peaking at number 36 on the week of 26 January 2023. The song also peaked at number 6 on the Independent Singles Chart, and at number 1 on the Independent Singles Breakers Chart in the UK as well. The song was also a top-40 hit in New Zealand, where it peaked at 31 on the week of 24 April 2023. However, it was removed the following week due to the chart's introduction of a catalog system, removing recurrent songs over a certain age and under a certain position. Nevertheless, the song is still charting on the catalog chart as of the week of 5 February 2024.

On the Billboard Global 200 chart, "Shut Up My Moms Calling" debuted at number 194 the week of December 10, 2022, and peaked at number 64 for the week of January 21, 2023. As of December 2025, the song has amassed over 1.5 billion streams on Spotify, while the sped-up version accumulated over 608 million streams.

== Charts ==
=== Weekly charts ===
Weekly chart performance for "Shut Up My Moms Calling"
Chart (2022–2024)	Peak position
Canada (Canadian Hot 100)	46
Global 200 (Billboard)	64
Netherlands (Single Top 100)	77
New Zealand (Recorded Music NZ)	30
Portugal (AFP)	85
Sweden (Sverigetopplistan)	57
Switzerland (Schweizer Hitparade)	64
UK Singles (Official Charts)	36
UK Indie Singles Chart	6
UK Indie Singles Breakers Chart	1
US Billboard Hot 100	68
US Hot R&B/Hip-Hop Songs (Billboard)	24

=== Year-end charts ===
2023 year-end chart performance for "Shut Up My Moms Calling"
Chart (2023)	Position
Global 200 (Billboard)	87
US Hot R&B/Hip-Hop Songs (Billboard)	71

2024 year-end chart performance for "Shut Up My Moms Calling"
Chart (2024)	Position
Global 200 (Billboard)	83
Portugal (AFP)	100

== Certifications and sales ==
Certifications for "Shut Up My Moms Calling"
Region	Certification	Certified units/sales
Denmark (IFPI Danmark)	Platinum	90,000^{‡}
Italy (FIMI)	Gold	50,000^{‡}
New Zealand (RMNZ)	4× Platinum	120,000^{‡}
Spain (Promusicae)	Platinum	60,000^{‡}
United Kingdom (BPI)	Platinum	600,000^{‡}
Streaming
Greece (IFPI Greece)	Platinum	2,000,000^{†}
^{‡} Sales+streaming figures based on certification alone.^{†} Streaming-only figures based on certification alone.
