= Emei (musician) =

American musician (born 1999)

- Emei in 2023

Background information
- Born: Emily Li; October 3, 1999 (age 27); New Jersey, U.S.
- Genres: Indie pop, pop rock, alternative pop
- Years active: 2021–present
- Label: Amuse
- Website: beacons.ai/emei

Chinese name
- Chinese: 李安梅
Transcriptions
Standard Mandarin
- Hanyu Pinyin: Lǐ Ānméi

Emily Li (born October 3, 1999), professionally known as Emei, is an American alternative pop musician based in Los Angeles, California.

== Early life ==
Li was born on October 3, 1999, in New Jersey to Chinese immigrant parents. She grew up listening to Amy Winehouse, Ella Fitzgerald, the Jackson 5, Sara Bareilles, and Taylor Swift, and has been singing since she was 9 years old.

As a teenager, Li competed on Dancing with the Stars in China. When Li was 15, she took a year off from school to compete on Chinese Idol and placed third. She attended Yale University, where she was a member of its a cappella group Mixed Company.

Li's stage name is "a cross between her Chinese name, An Mei, and her English nickname, Emmy."

== Music career ==
=== 2021–2022: Early Career and End of an Era EP ===
In 2022, Li's single “Late to the Party” went viral, gaining 5.5 million streams on music platforms and 9.5 million views on TikTok and Instagram Reels.

In 2022 Li released her debut EP, End of an Era.

=== 2023–2024: Scatterbrain and Rabbithole ===
In January 2023, she performed at the halftime of a Los Angeles Clippers game against the San Antonio Spurs. In November 2023, Li teamed up with production duo NOTD on "Hold On Me". Later in 2023, Li released her second EP, Scatterbrain.

In November 2024, Li released her third EP, Rabbithole. She described it as "going through this journey of going down into panic and anxiety and then coming out of it." Her single with Whethan, "SunnyD", was released in October 2024 in partnership with the beverage company SunnyD.

=== 2025 - Present: Night at the Opera ===
In early 2026, Li released two singles from her upcoming EP. On June 12, 2026, Li released her 5th EP Night at the Opera.

== Personal life ==
In 2022, Li graduated from Yale University with a degree in cognitive science.

In 2024, Li lost her grandmother, who was a big part of her childhood. The song "ginger tea" is dedicated to her.

== Discography ==
=== Extended plays ===
Title	Year	Source
End of an Era	2022	
Scatterbrain	2023	
Scatterbrain (Deluxe)	2024	
RABBITHOLE	2024	
Night at The Opera	2026	

=== Singles ===
As lead artist
Title	Year	Album / EP	Source
"What's the Point!"	2026	Night at the Opera	
"Night at the Opera"	2026	Night at the Opera	
"Ginger Tea"	2025	Non-album singles	
"Talk Talk Talk"	2025	Non-album singles	
"Crazy Stupid Love"	2025	Non-album singles	
"9 LIVES"	2024	RABBITHOLE	
"SUNNYD"	2024	Non-album single	
"ALL THESE KIDS"	2024	RABBITHOLE	
“RABBITHOLE”	2024	RABBITHOLE	
"Love Me Not"	2024	Non-album single	
"Don't Know About The World"	2023	Scatterbrain	
"Cynical"	2023	Scatterbrain	
"Scatterbrain"	2023	Scatterbrain	
"Backtrack"	2022	Non-album single	
"End of an Era"	2022	End of an Era	
"Regrets"	2022	End of an Era	
"Trust Issues"	2022	End of an Era	
"That Girl"	2022	End of an Era	
"Better People To Leave on Read"	2022	Non-album single	
"Late to the Party"	2022	End of an Era	
"Distracted"	2021	Non-album single	

As featured artist
Title	Year	Album / EP	Source
"Hold On Me (feat. Emei)" (NOTD, Emei)	2023	Non-album single	
"Re-Ignition" (Valorant, ARB4, Jazz Alonso, Emei)	2023	Non-album single	
"Stereo" (Jax Jones, Emei)	2025	Non-album single	
