= 80purppp =

Canadian rapper (born 2001)

- Born: Nathan Oddoye; August 3, 2003 (age 23); Harrow, England
- Origin: Edmonton, Alberta
- Genre: Hip hop
- Occupations: Rapper; songwriter
- Years active: 2018–present
- Label: Amuse

Nathan Oddoye, better known as 80purppp, is a Ghanaian-Canadian rapper and songwriter based in Edmonton. He is best known for his 2018 single "Hex".

Oddoye took piano lessons as a child, before being exposed to rap music in high school. He cites XXXTentacion as his biggest influence. In 2019, he released his debut album Violet High while still in high school. In 2022, he released the EPs If Anything and Je Sais.

== Discography ==
=== Albums ===
- Violet High (2019)
- If Anything (2022)
- Suite 96 (Side A) (2025)
- Suite 96 (Side B) (2025)

=== EPs ===
- Ultraviolet (2020)
- Je Sais (2022)
- Wendy Said I Shouldn't Call Anymore (2024)

=== Singles ===
- Cheryl Blossom (2018)
- Betty Cooper (2018)
- Hex (2018)
- WOS (2018)
- Summer Nights (2018)
- MIDNIGHT (2018)
- Never Been The Same (2018)
- Corazón (2021)
- M.O.M (2022)
- uni (2022)
- she want prada (2024)
