= Stela Cole =

American singer-songwriter from Peachtree City, GA U.S.

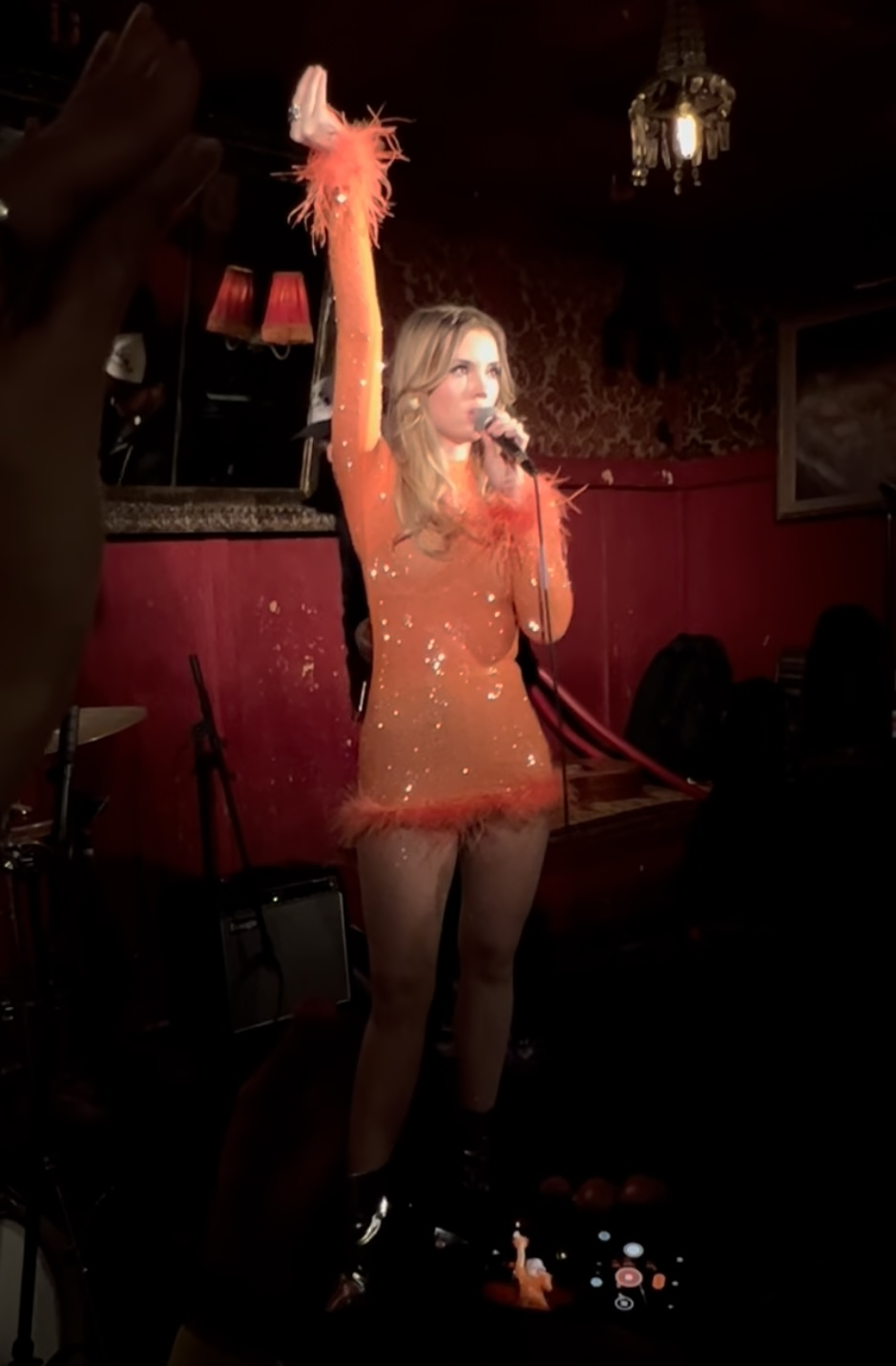
- Stela Cole doing “the hand” at her LA Live Show on November 10, 2022.

Background information
- Also known as: Stela Cole, Hollyn Cole
- Born: Hollyn Elizabeth Shadinger; October 21, 1997 (age 29); Knoxville, Tennessee, U.S.
- Origin: Peachtree City, Georgia, U.S.
- Genre: Pop
- Instruments: Vocals, guitar, piano, ukulele, bass
- Years active: 2010-present
- Labels: RCA Records, Ultra Records, Stelavision Records
- Website: stelacole.com

Hollyn Elizabeth Shadinger (born October 21, 1997), known professionally as Stela Cole is an American singer-songwriter. Her song “DIY” held the record for the most first week streams on American Song Contest where she reached the semi-finals as a contestant for her home state Georgia. Prior to ASC, Stela independently released her EP, Woman of the Hour (2020) and song “I Shot Cupid” (2021) through her self-funded label “Stelavision Records” and Venice Music. In 2025 she released her debut album I Die Where You Begin.

== Early life ==
Shadinger was born on October 21, 1997, in Knoxville, Tennessee. She was adopted at birth and grew up in Peachtree City, Georgia.

Shadinger grew up playing goalkeeper; however, after sustaining a serious back injury during a game at 15, she ended her competitive soccer career and turned her attention toward writing songs. After recording her first demos, she caught the attention of local producers who recognized her talent and introduced her to eventual manager Steve Sparrow. Sparrow went on to teach her how to write songs in a professional manner and is still her manager to this day.

Shadinger graduated from Starr’s Mill High School in 2016 and sang the national anthem at her graduation ceremony. She briefly attended Belmont University to pursue a degree in “Commercial Voice,” but dropped out to focus on her music career with RCA Records.

== Career ==
=== 2018: Musical debut with RCA Records ===
In 2018, Cole signed with RCA Records which released her debut single "You F O" and later on distributed her debut project "Throwing Up Butterflies"

Later in 2018, RCA Records dropped Cole a week after she played them the demo of her song "Love Like Mine" due to creative differences. According to Cole, They envisioned her to be a spin-off Meghan Trainor whereas Cole had a entirely different vision for her career and musical future.

=== 2020: Woman Of The Hour EP ===
In 2020, Cole started to roll out her EP Woman Of The Hour via independent music distribution service AWAL. Before the release of the EP, every track was released as a single except ''Kiss or Kill" which was released with the final EP delivery. The debut single of the EP was "Woman of the Hour.”

In a TikTok livestream, Cole revealed that she was able to fund her extended play, Woman of the Hour with the leftover money she saved from her RCA Records deal. Cole also stated on this livestream that she owns the masters to this EP and her song “I Shot Cupid,” therefore earning enough from streaming to pay her bills.

=== 2021 - 2023: American Song Contest & Signing to Ultra Records post EP ===
In early 2021, Stela teased her single "I Shot Cupid" on social platform TikTok. She then released it onto all platforms on June 1, 2021, independently.

Later in 2021, Cole officially signed with Ultra Records. Her first single with the label was "Walking On The Moon." Cole also appeared in the first ever season of American Song Contest to represent her home-state Georgia. She represented Georgia with the track "DIY" Cole made it to the semi-finals of the show where she was eliminated.

Cole throughout 2022 - 2023 continued to release a series of Non-album singles through her label Ultra Records including "Rhapsody In Pink", "Star", "Bye Bye Blues" & Roses.

=== 2024 to present: Exiting label deal and Debut Album: I Die Where You Begin ===
Cole used 2023 to split with her previous label and reclaimed her place as an independent musician via indie distribution service Amuse, in which she started rolling out her debut album. Cole cites Fleetwood Mac, The Mama’s and Papa’s, Tame Impala, The Eagles, Arctic Monkeys and more as inspirations for this new musical era. Cole describes this new era in her music as "more than a musical evolution, a rebirth."

Cole began this new musical journey via the release of a new single, "Die Hard" She then continued to release singles "Midnight Killer", "Blood Orange Wine", "Feel It Again", and "Candyland", all of which later appeared on a prequel EP of the album IDWYB: The Prequel, with new accompanying single "Now or Nevermind" Following the EP, Cole released further singles "Blue Moon", "God Loves You" and "Stereoqueen".

Following this, Cole announced the album title I Die Where You Begin, accompanied by the full tracklist via social platforms and a pre-release page on streaming service Spotify, for release on April 18th, 2025. Vinyl variants were also announced for pre-order during this time. The vinyl also features the tracks "Famous Last Words", "Exit Wounds" and "Rose Colored Lover", which were originally on the digital streaming variant. Upon the album's eventual release, Cole released the music video for the track "Loverspell" off the project.

== Discography ==
=== Studio albums ===
Title	Details
I Die Where You Begin	Released: March 14, 2025; Label: Stelavision Records, Amuse (music company); Formats: LP, digital download, streaming

=== Extended plays ===
Title	Details
Let Me In (released as Hollyn Cole)	Released: January 12, 2016; Formats: Digital download, streaming
Throwing Up Butterflies	Released: August 10, 2018; Label: RCA Records; Formats: Digital download, streaming
Woman of the Hour	Released: November 20, 2020; Label: Stelavison Records, AWAL; Formats: LP, Digital download, streaming

=== Singles ===
Title	Year	Album
"Maybe Love Will Last" (released under the name “Hollyn”)	2014	Non-album single
"Bodyrush"	2017	Non-album single
"Secret Lover"	2017	Non-album single
"You F O"	2018	Throwing Up Butterflies
Throwing Up Butterflies	2018	Throwing Up Butterflies
"Woman of the Hour"	2020	Woman of the Hour
"Love Like Mine"	2020	Woman of the Hour
"Goldrush"	2020	Woman of the Hour
"The Day It Rained in Southern California"	2020	Woman of the Hour
"Graveyard Shift"	2020	Woman of the Hour
"No Man's Land"	2020	Woman of the Hour
"I Shot Cupid"	2021	Non-album single
"Walking on the Moon"	2021	Non-album single
"DIY" (From American Song Contest)	2022	"American Song Contest: Episode 4"
"Rhapsody in Pink"	2022	Non-album single
"Star"	2022	Non-album single
"Bye Bye Blues"	2022	Non-album single
"Roses"	2023	Non-album single
"Die Hard"	2024	I Die Where You Begin
"Midnight Killer"	2024	I Die Where You Begin
"Blood Orange Wine"	2024	I Die Where You Begin
"Feel It Again"	2024	I Die Where You Begin
"Candyland"	2024	I Die Where You Begin
"Blue Moon"	2024	I Die Where You Begin
"God Loves You"	2025	I Die Where You Begin
"Stereoqueen"	2025	I Die Where You Begin

=== As featured artist ===
Title	Year	Album
"Edit You" (KREAM featuring Stela Cole)	2019	Non-album single
"Sweater" (Codeko featuring Stela Cole)	2019	Non-album single
