= Billions Tour =

2026 concert tour by Half Alive

- Tour by half•alive
- Location: North America
- Associated album: Billions (EP)
- Start date: October 30, 2026
- End date: November 19, 2026
- No. of shows: 11

half•alive concert chronology
- Persona World Tour (2025); Billions Tour (2026)

The Billions Tour is the seventh concert tour by the American musical duo half•alive, in support of their EP, Billions (2026). The tour is set to begin at the The Masquerade (Hell) in Atlanta on October 30, 2026, and will conclude at The Glass House in Pomona, California on November 19, 2026.

== Background and promotion ==
On Sunday, August 30, 2026, the band posted a video to their instagram account showing 7 city names with randomized letters for fans to guess what cities they will be going to on tour and that it will be "something different this time". On Monday, August 31, the tour was officially announced, revealing the 7 cities were Atlanta, Nashville, Boston, Toronto, Columbus, Denver, and Los Angeles.

On September 3, second shows in Boston and Denver were added due to high demand. According to the band, the tour consists of "some of the smallest venues we've played in a long time". On September 9, a second show in Toronto was announced along with a new show in Pomona, California that's promoted as the second Los Angeles show.

== Tour dates ==
List of North American concerts showing date, city, country, venue, opening act, attendance, and gross revenue
Date (2026)	City	Country	Venue	Opening acts	Attendance	Revenue
October 30	Atlanta	United States	The Masquerade (Hell)	—	—	—
October 31	Nashville	United States	Exit/In	—	—	—
November 3	Cambridge (Note: Labeled as Boston in promotional material.)	United States	The Sinclair	—	—	—
November 4	Cambridge	United States	The Sinclair	—	—	—
November 7	Toronto	Canada	Mod Club	—	—	—
November 8	Toronto	Canada	The Great Hall	—	—	—
November 10	Columbus	United States	King Of Clubs	—	—	—
November 14	Denver	United States	Bluebird Theater	—	—	—
November 15	Denver	United States	Bluebird Theater	—	—	—
November 17	Los Angeles	United States	El Rey Theatre	—	—	—
November 19	Pomona	United States	The Glass House	—	—	—
