= Half Alive (band) =

American rock band

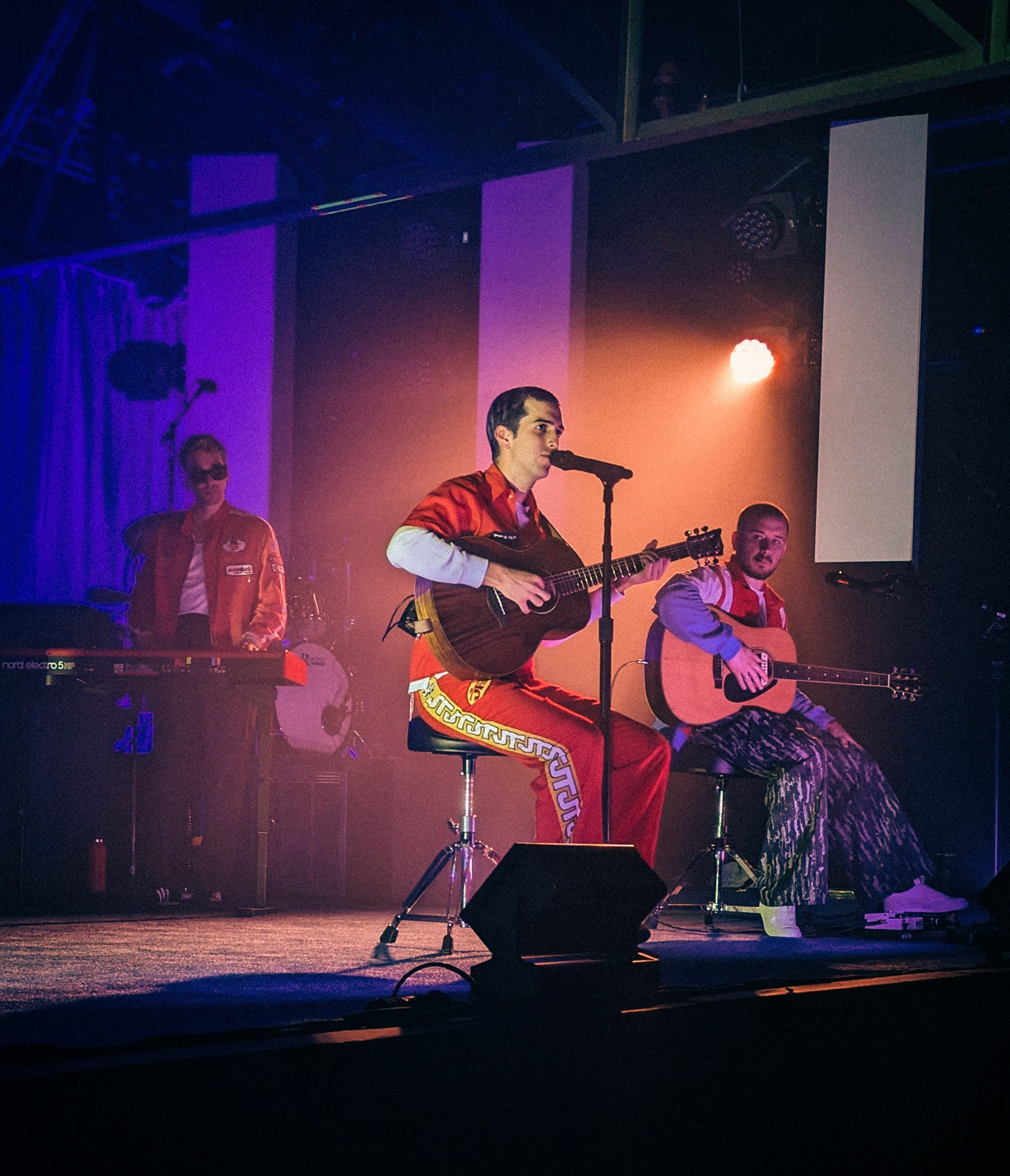
- Half Alive performing in Nashville, Tennessee, in April 2025

Background information
- Origin: Long Beach, California, U.S.
- Genres: Indie pop; pop; alternative rock; dance-pop; electronic rock; electropop
- Years active: 2016–present
- Labels: RCA; Virgin; ARRO
- Members: Josh Taylor; J. Tyler Johnson
- Past members: Brett Kramer
- Website: halfalive.co

Half Alive (stylized as half•alive or h•a) is an American rock duo formed in Long Beach, California, in 2016. It consists of vocalist Josh Taylor and bassist J. Tyler Johnson, formerly accompanied by drummer Brett Kramer. The band began recording music in 2017, and have since released three studio albums, a compilation vinyl record, three extended plays of new material, three extended plays of live recordings, and many singles.

The band gained recognition with their 2018 breakthrough single "Still Feel", which peaked at number seven on the Alternative Airplay chart and sold over a million copies. Their debut studio album, Now, Not Yet (2019), was released the following year and peaked at number 15 on Billboard's Top Alternative Albums chart.

== History ==
=== 2016–2017: Formation, beginnings, and 3 ===
Josh Taylor had previously been lead singer for The Moderates, a band from Long Beach, California. The band released their debut EP Colour in 2013. In November 2015, Taylor announced that he had embarked on a seven-month songwriting program several months prior during which he hoped to write 50 songs, a project that would eventually end on December 30. Brett Kramer, who Taylor knew as they attended the same non-denominational church, joined him on the project. The duo decided to form a band in 2016 while "watching the songs evolve as [they] were working together."

It was announced that The Moderates had disbanded on April 10, 2017, due to other commitments, but an EP as well as a new music video would be released by Taylor's new band, Half Alive. The band's first single, "The Fall", was released on April 24 of that year alongside its music video. Their debut EP, 3, was released on the same day. It was recorded with the help of James Krausse inside a helicopter hangar in the Mojave Desert which had been converted to a recording studio. A behind the scenes video for "The Fall" was uploaded onto the band's YouTube channel in July. "Aawake at Night", the second single from the EP, was released on November 6. The three songs from the EP collectively amassed 4 million streams on Spotify in July 2018 and currently have over 95 million as of November 2021.

Soon after the EP's release, the duo added a new member to their band, bassist J. Tyler Johnson, who Kramer met while performing at various music festivals at university, and together entered and won a jazz competition with during this time, while Johnson had been introduced to Taylor through the former's brother. This was done to avoid using computer-generated sounds in their songs and live performances in favor of live instruments.

=== 2018–2020: Now, Not Yet ===
On August 3, 2018, the band released the single "Still Feel", accompanied by a music video filmed at Popsicle LA. The video attracted attention for its choreography and cinematography, done by lead singer Josh Taylor and JA Collective, and received positive reviews from publications including Alternative Press and Rock Sound, the former calling the cinematography "first-class" and the latter calling the band "so multi-talented". NPR also featured the track on the "All Songs Considered" playlist and directed praise at its music video, while Triple J placed it on their "Best New Music" list, expressing similar sentiments. Thanks to the attention received by the track, the band signed a record deal with RCA Records soon after. The band subsequently performed their first live show in October 2018 at the Moroccan Lounge in Los Angeles. They embarked on their first tour from January to February 2019, taking place in the United States, Canada and the United Kingdom. Soon after the release of "Still Feel", the band disclosed that they were recording two new songs that they had previously performed live, but declined to reveal when they would be released.

On January 18, 2019, the band released the single "Arrow" and a music video premiered later that day. Time named it one of the best songs of the week, writing that "the song is filled with small surprises, like mini drum breaks and a groovy synth sequence that break it up into an unexpected composition that pulses with fresh energy." After the release of the single, the band disclosed to Rock Sound that they were working "on a larger body of work but keeping it discreet and mysterious." The following month, the band's track "Still Feel" entered the Hot Rock Songs and Alternative Songs chart in the United States and eventually peaked at number 26 on the former and number 21 on the latter. On March 14, the band made their late-night television debut as they played the track on Jimmy Kimmel Live!. The performance was well received by Billboard, calling it "spectacularly orchestrated," and Rolling Stone, who deemed it "cleverly choreographed." The band then announced a world tour taking place from June to November in Australia, North America and Europe.

On April 25, the trio announced on social media that they would be releasing all of their released material on a vinyl record named *7, which also includes an intro track for side B and an unreleased song named "Runaway". On June 13, the band released the track "Runaway" as a single alongside a heavily choreographed music video, simultaneously announcing that their debut studio album, Now, Not Yet, would be released on August 9. They performed the track live for Vevo's DSCVR series alongside "Arrow" and incorporated various dance interludes from their music videos in the renditions. The album's fourth single, "Pure Gold", which was produced by Ariel Rechtshaid, was released on July 19 alongside a "colorful and jubilant" visual. A fifth single titled "OK OK?" was premiered on July 31 at 10 AM PST on Zane Lowe's Beats 1 show as that day's "World Record". A music video for the song also shared that day.

The band released an EP titled "In Florescence" on May 1, 2020, which features orchestral reimaginings of four songs off Now, Not Yet. The EP was accompanied by a documentary titled "Now, Not Yet: in Florescence" that was released on Youtube on May 4.

=== 2021–2023: Conditions of a Punk ===
On March 10, 2021, the band announced that they will be performing at the 2021 Life Is Beautiful Music & Art Festival in September of that year. On March 24, they announced the release of a new single titled "What's Wrong", which was released the following week on March 31 alongside a music video. They further confirmed that it would serve as the first single from their upcoming second album. "What's Wrong" was a collaboration with production duo Ojivolta. A second single, "Time 2", was released on May 26.

On June 26, it was announced that the band would accompany Twenty One Pilots during the Takeover Tour as an opening act. This marked the band's first time playing a live show since the conclusion of the Now, Not Yet Tour in November 2019. The band released a third single, titled "Summerland", on July 23. The music video for "Summerland" stars actress Fivel Stewart. The fourth single, "Make of It", was released on September 16.

On November 17, the band announced a North American "Give Me Your Shoulders Tour", set to begin in February 2022. The announcement promised more throughout the week. This promise was kept true with the release of "Hot Tea" on November 18, along with an accompanying music video the next day. Unlike their past songs, "Hot Tea" features distorted vocals and trap inspired hi-hats.

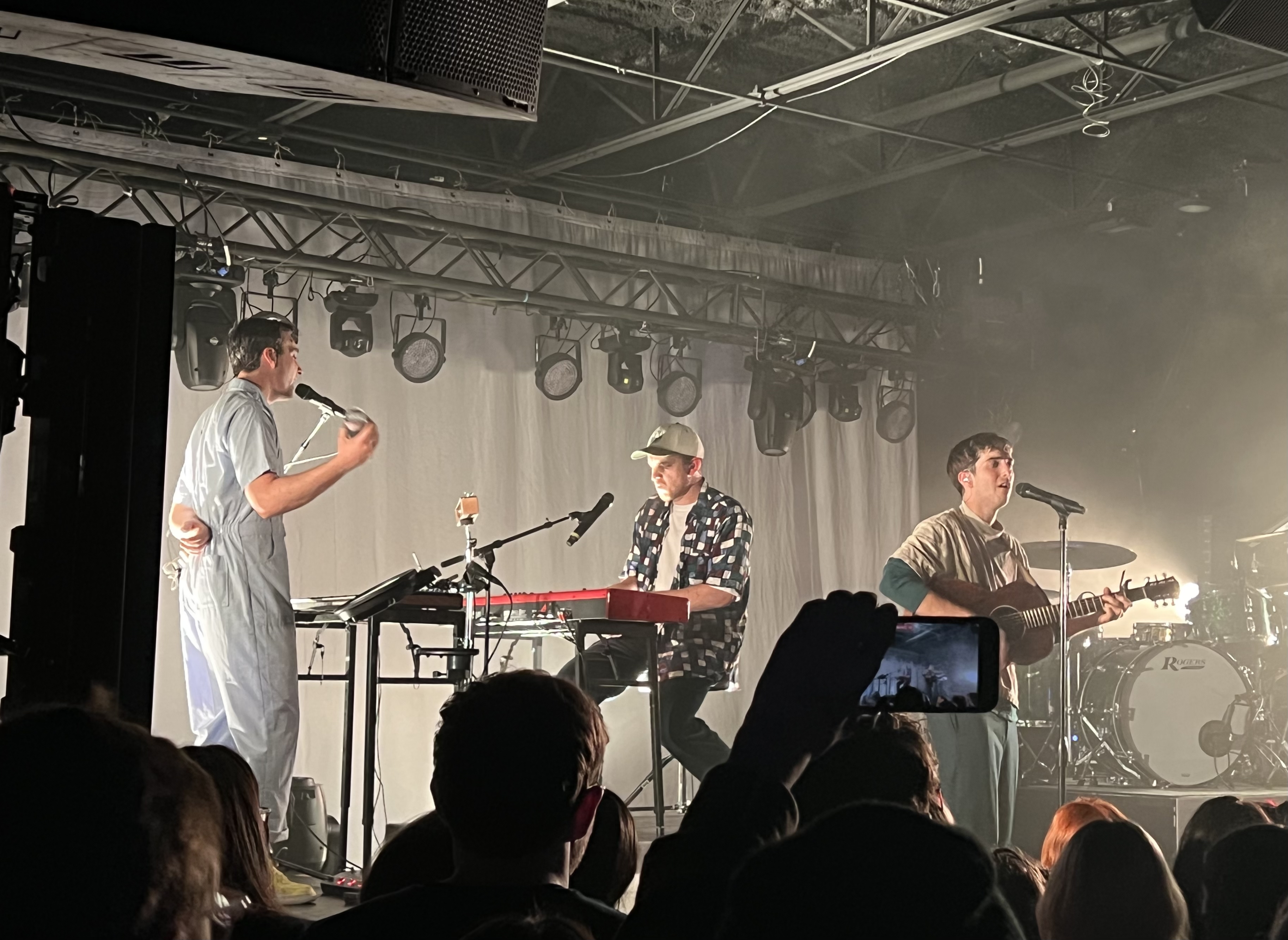
Half Alive performing in March 2022

"Hot Tea" was accompanied by the formal announcement of what was originally planned to be the band's sophomore album, Give Me Your Shoulders. The album was revealed as a two part record, the first of which—Give Me Your Shoulders, Pt. 1—was released on February 11, 2022, preceding the tour across North America, the United Kingdom and Europe.

On September 12, 2022, the band announced the cancellation of Give Me Your Shoulders, Pt. 2 in favor of "something beyond it". The band began what they described as a "new era" with the release of a spoken word track, "Night Swims (poem)" the same day. On September 14, the band began teasing the release of a new single titled "Did I Make You Up?". It was released on October 13, 2022, with its music video ending with the announcement of the release of their second album, Conditions of a Punk, on December 2, 2022. The track list for Conditions of a Punk features every track from Give Me Your Shoulders, Pt. 1. "Time 2" and "Night Swims (poem)" do not appear on either album. The day before the album release, the band also announced its accompanying tour, set to take place across North America, the UK, and Europe in early 2023; a second leg was announced in June with more dates in North America, plus shows in Mexico, Australia, and New Zealand.

On August 11, 2023, the band released an EP titled Live in Chicago, featuring four tracks recorded live from the Conditions of a Punk show held at the House of Blues in Chicago. Accompanying footage was released on their Youtube channel.

=== 2024–2025: Persona ===
On September 4, the band announced the release of a single titled "Sophie's House" and an accompanying music video, which was released on September 19. It was followed by the announcement of their third album Persona, which was released on November 15, 2024.

In devising the central themes of the album, Taylor explained those of the band's previous albums: Now, Not Yet centered around concepts such as trust and vulnerability, examining them in a cerebral way; Conditions of a Punk focused on the emotions within said concepts, viewing them from the perspective of love. Their third release focuses on perception, namely how one sees society, themselves, strangers, and more. The title refers to the personas people adopt when facing the world as well as the new perspectives gained when examining life upon taking them off. They are also represented via the album's mascots, a pair of aliens named after Sonny and Cher, who are featured on its cover art and in its corresponding music videos.

The band collaborated with Tommy King to produce the album, who had previously worked with Haim, The 1975, and Vampire Weekend. On creating the album, Johnson stated that it was "stripped to its bones, leaving only the essentials" and that the final product was a result of taking off the persona put on the band by others and "rediscovering their unique sound".

Two more singles with accompanying music videos were released in anticipation: "Automatic" and "Songs". A music video for "All My Love (Imperative)" was released alongside the full album, a collaboration filmed entirely with Ray-Ban Meta smart glasses.

On February 18, the band released the single "Automatic (acoustic)" alongside an accompanying music video. The band released two further singles: on March 21st, 2025, the band released the single "R.I.P." featuring The Walters, who were joining them on the Persona World tour: on April 11th, the band released "Automatic (Live from VEVO)" with an accompanying video.

On May 2, 2025, the band released a deluxe version of Persona, entitled Persona (Extended), which includes all 11 songs from the original record, the three aforementioned singles, acoustic versions of "Sophie's House" and "All My Love (Imperative)", a live performance of "R.I.P" live from VEVO, as well as a new song entitled "Tears in the Rain", an unreleased song which was performed on tour. An accompanying live performance video for "R.I.P. (Live from VEVO)" was released shortly afterwards.

=== 2026–present: Departure of Kramer and Billions ===
On June 12, 2026, long-time drummer Brett Kramer and Half Alive both announced via Instagram that the former would no longer be a member of the band, and that Taylor and Johnson would continue to release music as a duo.

On August 6, the band announced a new extended play titled Billions and released a single, "The Wolf", one of the EP's five songs. The EP was announced to be released by ARRO Records, owned by Tyler Joseph of the indie rock duo Twenty One Pilots. Billions was released on August 28, and the band subsequently announced a North American tour starting in October.

== Artistry ==
Half Alive's musical style has been described as indie pop, pop, alternative rock, dance-pop, electronic rock, and electropop, and further incorporates elements of R&B, funk and soul. The band have explained that they enjoy experimenting with numerous genres as well as sounds from 1960s, 1970s, and contemporary music.

Half Alive have cited film and psychology, specifically Jungian and Freudian concepts from which the band's name derives, as some of their influences, in addition to the work of Sufjan Stevens, Vulfpeck, Christine and the Queens, Kimbra, Emily King, Chance the Rapper, Tyler, the Creator and Twenty One Pilots, and incorporate themes of anxiety and religion in their songs. Taylor, in an interview with NBHAP, illustrated that while songwriting he aims to hit the "sweet spot" between "abstract" and "relatable" lyrics in order to allow listeners to interpret them in their own way.

== Band members ==
=== Current ===
- Josh Taylor – lead vocals, guitar, piano, keyboards, bass (2016–present)
- J. Tyler Johnson – bass, keyboards, synthesizers, guitar, backing vocals (2017–present)

=== Former ===
- Brett Kramer – drums, percussion, guitar, keyboards, backing vocals (2016–2026)

== Discography ==
=== Albums ===
==== Studio albums ====
List of studio albums, with selected chart positions
Title	Details	Peak chart positions		
Title	Details	US Alt.	US Rock	UK DL
Now, Not Yet	Released: August 9, 2019; Label: RCA; Format: Digital download, LP, CD, CS	15	46	63
Conditions of a Punk	Released: December 2, 2022; Label: RCA; Format: Digital download, LP, CD	—	—	—
Persona	Released: November 15, 2024; Label: Virgin; Format: Digital download, LP, CD	—	—	—
"—" denotes a recording that did not chart or was not released in that territory.

==== Compilation albums ====
Title	Details
*7	Released: May 17, 2019; Label: RCA; Format: 12″

=== Extended plays ===
Title	Details
3	Released: April 24, 2017; Label: Self-released; Format: Digital download
In Florescence	Released: May 1, 2020; Label: RCA; Format: Digital download
Give Me Your Shoulders, Pt. 1	Released: February 11, 2022; Label: RCA; Format: Digital download
Live From Chicago	Released: August 11, 2023; Label: RCA; Format: Digital download
At Fingerprints (Acoustic)	Released: April 19, 2024; Label: Self-released; Format: Digital download, LP
Billions	Released: August 28, 2026; Label: ARRO; Format: Digital download, LP, CD

=== Singles ===
Title	Year	Peak chart positions		Certifications	Album
Title	Year	US Alt.	US Rock	Certifications	Album
"The Fall"	2017	—	—		3
"Aawake at Night"	2017	—	—		3
"tip toes"	2017	—	—		3
"Still Feel"	2018	7	21	RIAA: Platinum	Now, Not Yet
"Arrow"	2019	—	—		Now, Not Yet
"Runaway"	2019	29	—		Now, Not Yet
"Pure Gold"	2019	—	—		Now, Not Yet
"OK OK?"	2019	—	—		Now, Not Yet
"Breakfast"	2019	—	—		Now, Not Yet
"What's Wrong"	2021	26	— (Note: "What's Wrong" did not enter the Rock Songs chart, but peaked at number 38 on the Rock Airplay chart.)		Give Me Your Shoulders, Pt. 1 & Conditions of a Punk
"Time 2"	2021	—	—		Non-album single
"Summerland"	2021	—	—		Give Me Your Shoulders, Pt. 1 & Conditions of a Punk
"Make of It"	2021	—	—		Give Me Your Shoulders, Pt. 1 & Conditions of a Punk
"Hot Tea"	2021	—	—		Give Me Your Shoulders, Pt. 1 & Conditions of a Punk
"Move Me"	2022	32	—		Give Me Your Shoulders, Pt. 1 & Conditions of a Punk
"Night Swims (poem)"	2022	—	—		Non-album single
"Did I Make You Up?"	2022	14	—		Conditions of a Punk
"High Up"	2022	—	—		Conditions of a Punk
"Nobody (feat. Dodie)"	2023	—	—		Non-album single
"Beige"	2023	—	—		Bose x NME: C23
"Subliminal"	2023	—	—		Non-album single
"Sophie’s House"	2024	—	—		Persona
"Automatic"	2024	40	—		Persona
"Songs (feat. Jordana)"	2024	—	—		Persona
"Automatic (acoustic)" (Note: Single release also includes "Automatic".)	2025	—	—		Persona (Extended)
"R.I.P" (feat. The Walters)"	2025	—	—		Persona (Extended)
"Automatic (Live from Vevo)" (Note: Single release also includes "Automatic" and "Automatic (acoustic)".)	2025	—	—		Persona (Extended)
"The Wolf"	2026	—	—		Billions
"—" denotes a recording that did not chart or was not released in that territory.

== Tours ==
=== Headlining ===
- Half Alive on Tour (2019)
- Now, Not Yet Tour (2019)
- Fall Tour 2021 (2021)
- Give Me Your Shoulders Tour (2022)
- Conditions of a Punk Tour (2023)
- Persona World Tour (2025)
- Billions Tour (2026)

=== Supporting ===
- Twenty One Pilots – Takeover Tour (2021-2022; 18 shows)
