= Still Feel =

Single by Half Alive

from the album Now, Not Yet
- Released: August 3, 2018
- Genre: Indie pop; funk
- Length: 4:07
- Label: RCA
- Songwriters: Emiko Bankson; J. Tyler Johnson; Brett Kramer; Rachel Kramer; James Krausse; Josh Taylor
- Producer: Eric Palmquist

Half Alive singles chronology
"Aawake at Night" (2017)	"Still Feel" (2018)	"Arrow" (2019)

Music video
- "Still Feel" on YouTube

"Still Feel" (stylized as still feel. or ~~still feel.~~) is a song by American band Half Alive. It was released on August 3, 2018 as the first single from their debut album, Now, Not Yet (2019). It was written by all three members of the band alongside Emiko Bankson, James Krausse, and Rachel Kramer, while production was handled by Eric Palmquist. "Still Feel" was described as an indie-funk, pop and funk-pop song with elements of jazz and electronic flourishes. Written after the dissolution of the lead singer's high school band, it describes "the theme of hope inside hopelessness and finding purpose and passion despite feeling unrooted" using space imagery.

The song has received critical acclaim and was the band's breakout single: it became their first to chart in the United States, securing a decent placement on the Hot Rock Songs chart and reaching the top 10 of the Alternative Songs chart. Its choreographed music video shot at Popsicle LA also received high praise and garnered audience attention on YouTube, bringing the band to RCA Records' attention and resulting with the band signing a record deal with them. The band have performed the song live on several occasions, notably on Jimmy Kimmel Live! "Still Feel" was certified Gold by the RIAA in 2021 for selling over 500,000 units in the United States.

== Background and development ==
In November 2015, Josh Taylor announced that he had embarked on a songwriting program several months prior, during which he hoped to improve his songwriting by writing 50 songs in seven months. Around this time, Taylor "felt very floaty because [he] had been losing roots in certain areas of [his] life," the band he had been in since high school having disbanded. Over the course of the project, he began sharing studio time with drummer Brett Kramer, who Taylor knew from the non-denominational church they both frequented. They eventually decided to form a new band called "Half Alive" together while "watching the songs evolve as [they] were working together."

"Still Feel" was the eleventh song off the project, but Taylor continued to work on it after its end. In an interview with Genius, Taylor stated that "it wasn't until the next year when [he] was in Nepal" with his cousin that he "took a deeper dive into all those feelings I had been having and then expanding on those." Production wise, the song began with an aggressive baseline that Kramer brought into the a songwriting session. Although it was not included, it "took [the band] in different directions," resulting in the chorus and pre-chorus. The band also wrote the song with the intention of making it unattractive for radio stations, consequently making "certain parts longer and [having] the ending fade out." The last part of the song to be written was the bridge; the band was stuck in traffic on the way to the recording studio, inspiring Taylor to write about feeling of being "lost in the in-between."

== Composition and lyrics ==
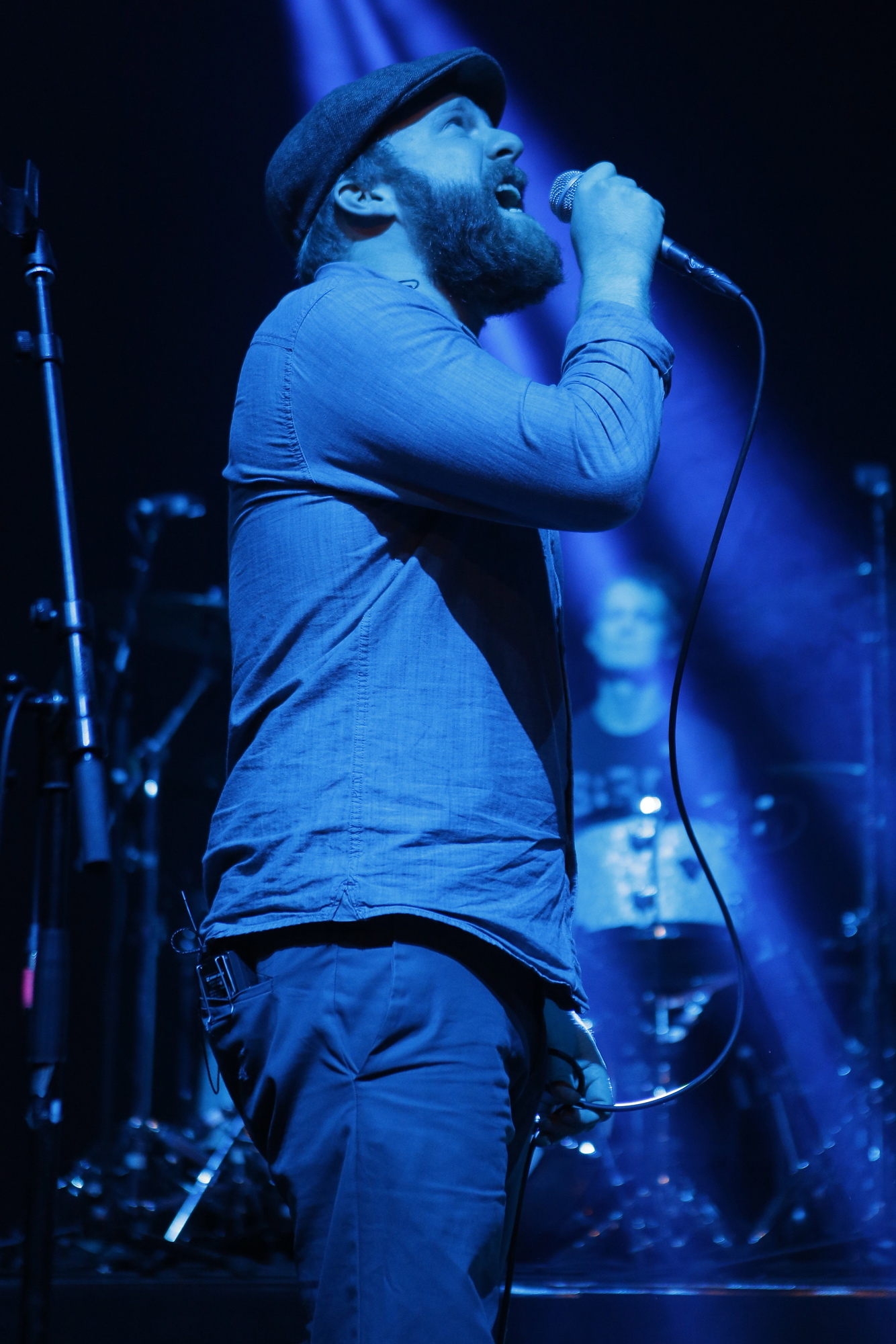
"Still Feel" was compared to the 2011 single "Too Close" by Alex Clare (pictured)

"Still Feel" was written by all three members of the band, Taylor, Kramer and Johnson, alongside Emiko Bankson, James Krausse and Rachel Kramer, while production was handled by Eric Palmquist. It is a jazz-infused indie-funk, pop and funk-pop song that features additional electronic flourishes. Mick Jacobs of Spectrum Culture noted Taylor's "staccato'd tenor" and described the track as "an intersection of Two Door Cinema Club, big band funk and Alex Clare's "Too Close"." Triple J music news producer Al Newstead highlighted the transitions from "smooth verses to a grittier, synth-ier chorus" as well as the hook's additional horns and "full-blown disco burn-out" at the end of the song.

The song centers around "the theme of hope inside hopelessness and finding purpose and passion despite feeling unrooted," described through the metaphor of "an astronaut drifting through outer space and hitting the atmosphere." In one line appears the words "sleepy womb" (a suggested title for the track), which was inspired by a scene in the 2013 film Gravity where "Sandra Bullock is floating and it looks like a womb when she is just there and exhausted." Kramer, in the Genius interview, explained that in the chorus the band tried to "create this massive image of somebody collapsing into the atmosphere" through the use of metaphors; later on, Taylor stated that the outro featured two voices in contradiction, one despairing, the other insisting that "it's not hopeless," with the latter one eventually "winning."

== Reception ==
"Still Feel" was met with critical acclaim. Alternative Press described the song as a "banger," describing it as "irresistible, entertaining and as groovy as can be." Robin Hilton and Bob Boilen included it on NPR's "All Songs Considered" list, while Gab Ginsberg and Jason Lipshutz of Billboard listed it as one of "20 cool pop songs for your summer 2019 playlist". Newstead included it on Triple J's "Best New Music" list, hailing it as "instantly addictive" and praised its production. Gigwise journalist Julia Hope named it the band's best song thus far and a "feel-good, soulful anthem;" she also opined that its lyrics "seem to deliver a deeper meaning" upon further listening and called it "addictive from start to finish." Lucy Mapstone of the Belfast Telegraph expressed similar sentiments: she called it "infectiously upbeat" as well as "easily the best offering" on its parent album Now, Not Yet, further praising it as a "a jazzy-sounding song with an over-exuberant feel and layers upon layers of musical fun." Jacobs considered that it "exemplifies the group's exciting draws" and expressed pleasure that it "rightfully gained traction in late 2018." The track was the band's breakout single and first to chart in the United States, reaching number 7 on the Alternative Songs chart and at number 21 on Hot Rock Songs chart in July 2019.

== Music video ==
The music video for "Still Feel", shared upon the single's release date, was directed by Taylor, who had done so for all of the band's videos thus far, and choreographed by JA Collective, specifically Jordan Johnson and Aidan Carberry. Shot at Popsicle LA, it features the band performing choreography to the song in a large room illuminated by LED ceiling tiles. Speaking to OC Weekly, Taylor revealed that it was they were allowed twelve hours at the location to shoot the video, having rehearsed for seven non-consecutive days for two weeks. He added that the video for the band's previous single, "Aawake at Night", catalysed the concept for the one for "Still Feel" since it "made [him] feel comfortable enough to try doing the entire next video with dance in mind." Upon its release, Kramer stated that the band members "actually found [themselves] engaging with the song in a more meaningful way" while learning the choreography since "learning syncopated dance moves on the bridge actually ended up making the parts easier to play on [their] instruments."

=== Reception ===
The music video for "Still Feel" was acclaimed, earning praise for its dance choreography. Alternative Press considered it "an incredible dance number," further lauding its cinematography and "perfectly synched body movements." Newtead dubbed it "a stunner," while Hilton and Boilen called it "remakable." Ginsberg and Lipshutz described it as "impressively-choreographed" and a "must-watch." Monocle opined that it was "cheeky co-ordinated choreography at its best." The video also gained a favorable audience reception, gaining traction on video sharing site YouTube, and led to the band signing a major label deal with RCA Records. JA Collective have since become the band's choreographers and accompany them on tour.

== Live performances ==
Half Alive made their late night television debut on March 14, 2019 with a choreographed performance of "Still Feel" with JA Collective on Jimmy Kimmel Live! It was praised by publications including Billboard and Rolling Stone, the former considering it "show-stopping" and the latter calling it "cleverly choreographed." In August of that year, the band also performed the song with choreography at Lollapalooza, the ALT Summer Camp and a Tiny Desk concert for NPR.

== Personnel ==
Credits adapted from Tidal.

- Eric Palmquist – producer, engineer, programmer, keyboards
- Josh Taylor – songwriter, lead vocals
- Brett Kramer – songwriter, drums
- J Tyler Johnson – songwriter, bass
- Emiko Bankson – songwriter, strings
- James Krausse – songwriter, mastering engineer, mixing engineer
- Rachel Kramer – songwriter
- Taylor Covey – horn
- Vinney Dawson – horn

== Charts ==
=== Weekly charts ===
Chart (2019)	Peak position
US Alternative Airplay (Billboard)	7
US Hot Rock & Alternative Songs (Billboard)	21
US Rock & Alternative Airplay (Billboard)	19

=== Year-end charts ===
Chart (2019)	Position
US Alternative Airplay (Billboard)	29
US Hot Rock & Alternative Songs (Billboard)	62

== Certifications ==
Region	Certification	Certified units/sales
United States (RIAA)	Platinum	1,000,000^{‡}
^{‡} Sales+streaming figures based on certification alone.
