= I Love You So (song) =

2014 debut single by the Walters

Single by the Walters

from the EP Songs for Dads
- Released: November 28, 2014
- Length: 2:40
- Label: The Walters; Warner
- Producers: The Walters, Charles Ekhaus

The Walters singles chronology
"I Love You So" (2014)	"Hunk Beach / I Wanna Be Good" (2015)

Music video
- "I Love You So" on YouTube

"I Love You So" is a song by American indie-pop band the Walters. It was released on November 28, 2014 from the band's debut EP Songs for Dads. In 2021, it went viral on video sharing app TikTok, where it has over half a million views, and gained over 1 billion streams on Spotify. The song was included in the band's first EP after their 2021 reunion, Try Again, released in May 2022.

== Background ==
In 2017, the band performed in Lollapalooza, hereafter they announced the band temporarily disbanded. In mid-2021, the song started to become popular on TikTok, at that time the band's members reconnected together, and signed with Warner Records. In a press release, the band said: "'I Love You So'. This song kicked off our career and now it's the song that got the band back together". About the internet meme on TikTok, the band told magazine Variety: "It was a sign from the universe, There's a reason why this song keeps coming back into our lives, and the TikTok virality was definitely the extra kick we needed to be like, 'Okay, let's give this another shot and let's try to make the most of it.'".

== Content ==
Warner Records CEO Aaron Bay-Schuck stated in an interview with Billboard: "I Love You So" is "a perfect and modern example of a great song, [...] The song is memorable upon first listen and timeless in its production so no surprise it has risen above the clutter to identify itself as a hit song".

== Remix ==
In January 2022, the band released a new remix version with King Henry.

== Credits and personnel ==
Credits adapted from Tidal.

The Walters

- Charlie Ekhaus – drums, mastering, mixing, producer
- Walter Kosner – guitar, producer
- Luke Olson – lead vocals, producer
- MJ Tirabassi – backing vocals, producer
- Danny Wells – bass, producer

Additional musicians

- Aaron Aptaker – keyboards

== Charts ==
=== Weekly charts ===
Chart performance for "I Love You So"
Chart (2021–2024)	Peak position
Australia (ARIA)	98
Canada (Canadian Hot 100)	58
Global 200 (Billboard)	55
Indonesia (Billboard)	11
Lithuania (AGATA)	21
Malaysia (RIM)	13
Philippines (Billboard)	19
Philippines Hot 100 (Billboard)	40
Portugal (AFP)	77
Singapore (RIAS)	24
UK Singles (OCC)	87
US Billboard Hot 100	71
US Adult Top 40 (Billboard)	20
US Hot Rock & Alternative Songs (Billboard)	6
US Mainstream Top 40 (Billboard)	21

=== Year-end charts ===
2022 year-end chart performance for "I Love You So"
Chart (2022)	Position
Global 200 (Billboard)	147
Lithuania (AGATA)	75
US Hot Rock & Alternative Songs (Billboard)	15

Chart (2024)	Peak position
Philippines (Philippines Hot 100)	64

== Certifications ==
Certifications for "I Love You So"
Region	Certification	Certified units/sales
Canada (Music Canada)	2× Platinum	160,000^{‡}
Denmark (IFPI Danmark)	Gold	45,000^{‡}
France (SNEP)	Platinum	200,000^{‡}
Italy (FIMI)	Gold	50,000^{‡}
New Zealand (RMNZ)	2× Platinum	60,000^{‡}
Portugal (AFP)	Gold	10,000^{‡}
Spain (PROMUSICAE)	Gold	30,000^{‡}
United Kingdom (BPI)	Platinum	600,000^{‡}
United States (RIAA)	3× Platinum	3,000,000^{‡}
^{‡} Sales+streaming figures based on certification alone.

== Release history ==
Release history for "I Love You So"
Region	Date	Format	Label	Ref.
Various	November 28, 2014	Digital download; streaming	The Walters; Warner	
Italy	November 23, 2021	Contemporary hit radio	Warner	
United States	January 18, 2022	Contemporary hit radio	Warner	
