= Yot Club =

American singer-songwriter (born 1998)

Background information
- Born: John Ryan Kaiser
- Origin: Mississippi
- Genres: Indie pop; lo-fi; bedroom pop; post-punk; synth pop; surf pop
- Occupations: Singer; songwriter; producer
- Instruments: Vocals; guitar; bass; keyboards; drums
- Years active: 2014–present
- Website: www.yotclubmusic.com

John Ryan Kaiser, known professionally as Yot Club, is an American singer-songwriter and producer from Mississippi. He is best known for his single "YKWIM?", which was certified platinum by the Recording Industry Association of America in November 2022.

== Career ==
Kaiser began playing the guitar when he was eight years old. He first began creating music under the name Amateur Observer in 2014, releasing his songs through SoundCloud.

Kaiser began releasing music as Yot Club in 2019. His first track under this pseudonym was "Jaded". He released his debut EP "Aquarium" in 2019. Originally considering his music career as a hobby, he quickly gained fame for his song "YKWIM?", released on his 2019 EP "Bipolar", after the song went viral on TikTok.

In May 2021, he moved from Hattiesburg, Mississippi to Nashville. He released his EP Santolina in January 2022 following the single "Deer Island".

He released his debut album off the Grid in June 2022, containing the single "u dont kno me".

In 2023, "YKWIM?" was certified Silver by the British Phonographic Industry (BPI).

== Style ==
His music is considered to be a mix of indie pop, lo-fi, bedroom pop, post-punk, synth pop and surf pop. He describes his sound as being inspired by feelings of nostalgia, liminality as well as his experience moving from a small town to Nashville.

== Discography ==
=== Albums ===
- off the grid (2022)
- Rufus (2024)
- Simpleton (2026)

=== Extended plays ===
- aquarium (2019)
- Bipolar (2019)
- bleach beach (2019)
- Nature Machine (2020)
- YKWIM? EP (2021)
- Santolina (2022)
- off the grid (deluxe) (2023)
- amateur observer (2023)
- Rule of Thirds (2025)

=== Singles ===
- "japan" (2019)
- "Fly Out West" (2019)
- "Comfort Zone" (2019)
- "Landlord" (2019)
- "The Bay" (2020)
- "Spiral Stairs" (2020)
- "Go Away" (2020)
- "Alive" (2020)
- "Deer Island" (2021)
- "Hole" (2021)
- "stuck on you" (with april june, 2022)
- "rock candy" (2022)
- "One Last Time" (Summer Salt remix, 2023)
- "Mr. Rager" (2023)
- "Safe House" (with Jordana, 2023)
- "LAUREN" (with spill tab, 2023)
- "Pixel" (2024)
- "Nostalgia" (2024)
- "No way" (2024)
- "I got cracked (yot club version)" (with vundabar, 2024)
- "Fool (Field Medic Version)" (with Field Medic, 2024)
- "Too Far Gone (CASTLEBEAT Rework)" (with CASTLEBEAT, 2024)
- "Falling off / Circles in my brain" (2025)
- "On the ground / Trapped awake" (2025)
- "Tether" (with Harrison Lipton, 2025)
- "for sale 2 own" (with Glitter Party, 2025)
- "Projecting” (2026)
- "Here & Now" (2026)
