= Now, Not Yet =

2019 studio album by Half Alive

Studio album by Half Alive
- Released: August 9, 2019
- Genre: Pop
- Length: 41:31
- Label: RCA
- Producers: Mike Crossey; Eric Palmquist; Mike Elizondo; Ariel Rechtshaid; Half Alive; Paul Meany

Half Alive chronology
*7 (2019)	Now, Not Yet (2019)	In Florescence (2020)

Singles from Now, Not Yet
- 1. "still feel." Released: August 3, 2018; 2. "arrow" Released: January 18, 2019; 3. "RUNAWAY" Released: June 13, 2019; 4. "Pure Gold" Released: July 18, 2019; 5. "ok ok?" Released: July 31, 2019; 6. "BREAKFAST" Released: October 11, 2019

Now, Not Yet is the debut studio album by American band Half Alive, released through RCA Records on August 9, 2019. The songwriting process for the record began in 2015, before Half Alive was formed, during a challenge in which lead singer Josh Taylor would try to write 50 songs along with drummer Brett Kramer. After the band's formation and the release of their debut EP 3, bassist J Tyler Johnson was added to the band in 2017 and from then the trio would rent several Airbnbs to write the songs off the album until 2019.

Upon release, Now, Not Yet was met with positive reviews, and secured placements on the US Heatseekers Albums, Alternative Albums, and Rock Albums charts, including at number one on the former. The record was supported by six singles: "still feel.", "arrow", "RUNAWAY", "Pure Gold", "ok ok?", and "BREAKFAST". The band embarked on a world tour in support of the album from August to November 2019.

== Background ==
Josh Taylor, wanting to prove himself as a songwriter, announced in November 2015 that he had been on a seven-month songwriting program for the past several months during which he hoped to write 50 songs by the end of December. As the project progressed, Taylor began to share studio time with drummer Brett Kramer. The program ended on December 30. The duo finally decided to form a band named Half Alive in 2016 while "watching the songs evolve as [they] were working together." They spent that year recording three of the 50 songs in a converted helicopter hangar in the Mojave Desert alongside producer James Krausse, and released them as an extended play titled 3 in 2017. It attracted some attention partly due to its two singles "The Fall" and "Aawake at Night". Soon after the EP's release, the duo added a new member to their band, bassist J Tyler Johnson, in order to avoid using computer-generated sounds in their songs and live performances in favor of live instruments.

The songwriting process for the two eldest songs of the album began during the 50-song project, the first of which was "arrow" at number 5, while "still feel." was the eleventh song from the challenge. These were the only songs from the project to be included on the album. "creature" was the first song to be written by the band as a full trio, and was the one that took the longest to complete. "RUNAWAY", "TrusT", "ice cold." and "BREAKFAST" came about during the band's first songwriting session together at an Airbnb cabin in Big Bear, California, and they continued to write in rented Airbnbs one week at a time in different climates and environments, such as deserts and by the ocean, until the album was finished in 2019. This was because they found that working at one of their houses "wasn't as productive" as in a secluded environment. The locations themselves inspired different songs, with faster songs being written in the heat and slower ones in a colder environment. The Airbnbs also forced the band to work within limitations. For example, some lodgings had rules forbidding an excess of noise on pain of being forced out of them, so the group consequently wrote without percussion parts; these constraints "inspired what the songs turned into." The last song to be written was "Pure Gold"; the band was initially unsure whether to include it on the record, but after being urged to finish it by their team, they were grouped with "one of [their] favorite producers" and the song "[turned] into ... one of [their] favorites of the album."

== Music and lyrics ==
Now, Not Yet has been described as a pop album, although the band drew on a range of other musical influences during the songwriting process; Kramer and Johnson studied music at university with an emphasis on jazz, and elements of the genre would appear on the record, while Taylor focused on pop music and performance. The trio stated in an interview that "with all [their] backgrounds combined it creates a blend of thoughtful musical ideas that still have a wide audience focus." They added that music platforms and the prominence of playlists and music sharing also influenced the album's sonic direction, explaining that "it feels as if everyone is able to hear a more electric group of music, and [they] as a band try to create similar genre fluid moments in [their] music."

Throughout the album, Half Alive explore themes surrounding faith and religion, specifically its impact on a person's well-being. Music journalists have noted that the band "wear their religion proudly," influencing both the musical and lyrical aspects of the record; the album includes a number of "gospel-like anthems" and the penultimate track "Breakfast" includes choral vocals, while the lyrics of the final song "Creature" feature allusions to creation. The album contains a brief interlude titled "The Notion", which is a voice message sent by Liz Ord, a UK-based model, to a member of JA Collective, who perform choreography with the band, during which she expresses surprise and comfort at the fact that all the people the recipient of the message tours with have "faith", and further says: "I find it so rare meeting people who are young and believe here."

== Promotion ==
On August 3, 2018, the band released a song titled "Still Feel", along with a choreographed music video. Both the song and music video attracted the attention and praise of several publications including Alternative Press, Rock Sound and NPR, and was the band's first song to chart, reaching number 7 and 21 on the US Alternative and Rock charts respectively. It is regarded as the band's breakthrough single. On January 18, 2019, the band released a second single called "Arrow" alongside another music video featuring choreography, and was praised as one of the best tracks of its week of release by Time. The following month, the band revealed to Rock Sound that they were working "on a larger body of work but keeping it discreet and mysterious."

Half Alive made their late-night television debut with an elaborately choreographed performance of "Still Feel" on Jimmy Kimmel Live! which was positively reviewed by Rolling Stone and Billboard. The group subsequently announced that they would be embarking on tour beginning on August 16, 2019, in Sydney, Australia (excluding their appearance at the Firefly Music Festival in Dover, Delaware on June 22) and concluding on November 17, 2019, in Glasgow, Scotland. In April, they revealed that they would be releasing a limited vinyl record featuring all of their released work as well as one new track titled "Runaway". After this, the band started to tease on social media about a new project in the works. On June 13, 2019, the band officially released "Runaway" as a single alongside a music video directed by Carlos López Estrada, and announced that their debut album Now, Not Yet would be released on August 9, 2019. On July 18, they released "Pure Gold", the fourth single from the album, alongside a visual also directed by López Estrada. On July 25, 2019, the band released the official tracklist for the album. A fifth single titled "OK OK?" was premiered on July 31 at 10 AM PST on Zane Lowe's Beats 1 show as that day's "World Record", and was also accompanied by its music video. The track "Breakfast" was released as the album's sixth single on October 11.

On July 15, Vevo released two videos of Half Alive performing "Arrow" and "Runaway" in one take for their "Vevo DSCVR" series. In early August, the band appeared at the 2019 Lollapalooza festival and ALT Summer Camp, performing with their signature choreography. NPR shared the band's "Tiny Desk Concert" on the 12th of the month, in which the trio played "Runaway", "Still Feel" and "Ice Cold". On September 10, the band appeared on The Late Late Show with James Corden, performing the track "Runaway".

== Reception ==
Professional ratings
Review scores
Source	Rating
Belfast Telegraph	7/10
Gigwise	8/10 stars
laut.de	4/5 stars
Spectrum Culture	3.25/5 stars

Now, Not Yet received positive reviews from music critics. NPR listed the release on their "Top 7 Albums For August 9", dubbing it a "slick slice of summertime fun." Callie Ahlgrim of Insider also included it on their list of best new music for that week, including NPR's description of it in her assessment, but added that the record "is more than just fodder for your beach playlist," highlighting its "profound themes" and Taylor's vocals. Music Week writer Ben Homewood considered it "coated in good vibes" due to its songs' "natural gloss" and "modern studio sheen." Monocle opined that the release did not disappoint upon the expectation generated by its lead single, writing that it is "just as energising" and "coherent but never tired."

Julian Völker, writing for German online music magazine laut.de, claimed that it was "peppered with so many ideas and peculiarities that it breaks the boundaries of the genre," dubbing it an "involuntary pop masterpiece" and further praised its musical diversity. In a positive review for Gigwise, Julia Hope praised the musical versatility found on the record and was impressed by the incorporation of electronic elements "into [the band's] instrumental talent and classical tastes," describing the trio as "the feel-good, political, soulful and musically-genius band we didn't know we'd been yearning for." Mick Jacobs was more reserved in his assessment for Spectrum Culture; he considered it a promising debut album, writing that "when they shine, [Half Alive] glow with potential," but considered its lyrics inconsistent in quality. Lucy Mapstone of the Belfast Telegraph stated that although the album contains "moments erring on the more challenging side," it overall "is a coherent, peppy, vibrant offering from the California up-and-comers."

In the United States, Now, Not Yet debuted at number 1, 15 and 46 on the Heatseekers Albums, Alternative Albums and Rock Albums charts respectively with 5,000 album-equivalent units, of which 3,000 were in traditional album sales. The band also entered the Billboard Emerging Artists chart at number 16 that week.

== Track listing ==
All tracks are written by Josh Taylor, Brett Kramer, and J Tyler Johnson (additional writers listed below).

Now, Not Yet track listing
No.	Title	Writer(s)	Producer(s)	Length
1.	"OK OK?"		Mike Crossey	3:48
2.	"Runaway"		Crossey	2:42
3.	"Maybe"		Crossey	3:13
4.	"The Notion"			0:36
5.	"Still Feel"	Emiko Bankson; James Krausse; Rachel Kramer	Eric Palmquist	4:07
6.	"Trust"	Faith Dunsterville	Crossey	4:17
7.	"Arrow"		Mike Elizondo	3:42
8.	"Pure Gold"		Ariel Rechtshaid	3:34
9.	"Ice Cold" (featuring Kimbra)	Austin Price	Elizondo	2:57
10.	"Rest" (featuring Samm Henshaw)	Bankson; Samm Henshaw	Elizondo	3:29
11.	"Breakfast"		Elizondo; Half Alive	3:31
12.	"Creature"		Paul Meany	5:35
Total length:				41:31

Notes

- Tracks 1, 4, 5, 7, 9, and 12 are stylized in lowercase.
- Tracks 2 and 11 are stylized in all caps.
- Tracks 5 and 9 are stylized with a full stop (period) at the end of their titles.
- Track 6 is stylized as "TrusT".

== Personnel ==
Technical

- Mike Crossey – producer (tracks 1, 2, 3, 6)
- Stephen Sesso – engineer (tracks 1, 2, 3, 6)
- Adam Hawkins – mixing engineer (tracks 1, 2, 3, 6, 7, 8, 9, 10, 11, 12)
- Chris Gehringer – mastering engineer (tracks 2, 7)
- Eric Palmquist – producer (track 5), engineer (track 5), programmer (track 5)
- Emiko Bankson – engineer (track 5)
- Mike Elizondo – producer (tracks 7, 9, 10, 11), programmer (track 7, 9, 10)
- Alonzo Lazaro – assistant engineer (tracks 7, 9, 10)
- Henry Lunetta – editor (tracks 7, 9, 10)
- Brent Arrowood – engineer (tracks 7, 9, 10, 11, 12)
- Ariel Rechtshaid – producer (track 8)
- Jasmine Chen – assistant engineer (track 8)
- Matt DiMona – assistant engineer (track 8)
- John DeBold – engineer (track 8)
- Half Alive – producer (track 11)
- Paul Meany – producer (track 12), programmer (track 12)
- Hugo Bastos AKA Lunático – cover artwork

Musicians

- Half Alive – horn (tracks 1, 6)
- Lemar Guillary – trombone (track 1)
- Mike Cottone – trumpet (track 1), fluegelhorn (track 6), horn (track 6)
- Taylor Covey – horn (track 5)
- Vinney Dawson – horn (track 5)
- Eric Palmquist – keyboards (track 5)
- Emiko Bankson – strings (tracks 5, 6, 10), choir (track 11)
- Mike Elizondo – keyboards (tracks 7, 9, 10), choir (track 11)
- Kimbra – vocals (track 9)
- J Tyler Johnson – strings (track 10), choir (track 11)
- Samm Henshaw – vocals (track 10)
- Brett Kramer – choir (track 11)
- Josh Taylor – choir (track 11)
- Paul Meany – keyboards (track 12)

== Charts ==
Chart performance for Now, Not Yet
Chart (2019)	Peak position
Australian Digital Albums (ARIA)	44
Australia (ARIA Hitseekers)	7
US Top Album Sales (Billboard)	33
US Top Alternative Albums (Billboard)	15
US Heatseekers Albums (Billboard)	1
US Top Rock Albums (Billboard)	46
