= Serhat Durmus =

Music producer and DJ

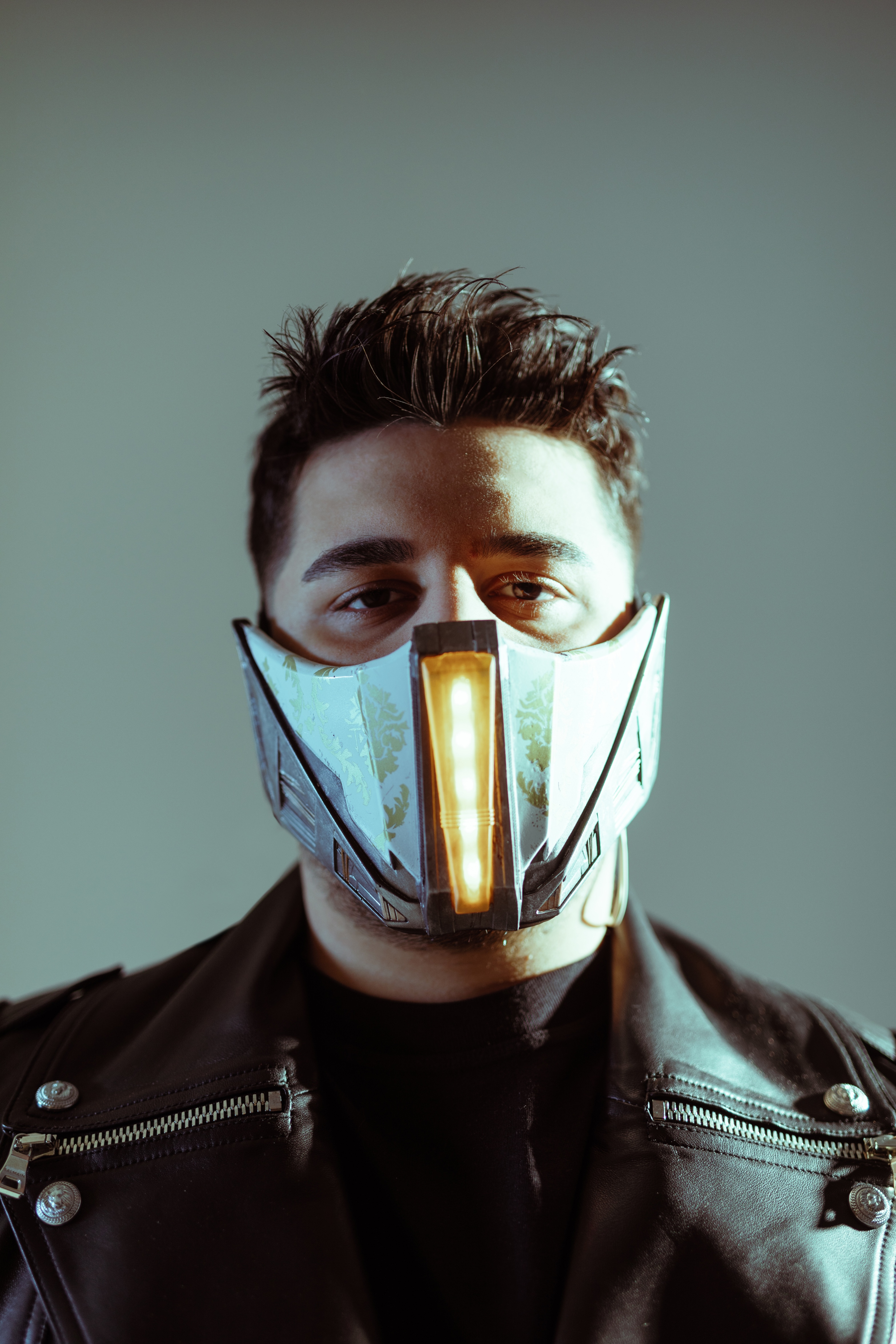
- Serhat Durmus official photoshoot for the Arres Album, 2023

Background information
- Born: 10 April 1998 (age 28); İzmir, Turkey
- Genres: Electronic; Trap; World music; Chill-out; Ambient
- Occupations: Music producer, DJ, composer
- Years active: 2016–present
- Labels: Amuse, Arres
- Website: serhatdurmus.com

Serhat Durmuş (born 10 April 1998) is a Turkish producer, DJ, singer and songwriter. Durmuş was born in 1998 in İzmir, Turkey. With more than 500 million streams as of 2023, Durmuş has appeared on playlists in many countries, such as Turkey, Germany, the Netherlands, and the United States. He is among the most listened to Turkish artists in the world. In 2019, the song "Minnet Eylemem" was used in the TV series Kuzgun. His debut album Arres was released in 2021. Earlier the same year he released the single "My Feelings" with the British singer-songwriter Georgia Ku. In February 2022, he took part in the opening ceremony of the Formula E races in Riyadh.
