= Hotel Ugly =

American indie pop act

- Origin: Houston, Texas, U.S.
- Genres: Indie pop; alternative pop; R&B; indie rock
- Years active: 2019–present
- Label: Amuse
- Members: Mike Fiscella
- Past members: Chris Fiscella
- Website: hotelugly.com

Hotel Ugly is an indie pop musical project of Mike Fiscella, under the stage name Mike Vince. The project was formerly a duo with Mike and his brother Chris. Hotel Ugly is best known for the song "Shut Up My Moms Calling," which has charted in multiple territories, including reaching number 68 on the Billboard Hot 100 and number 64 on the Billboard Global 200.

== History ==
Hotel Ugly was initially formed in Houston, Texas as a duo in 2019 and composed of brothers Mike and Chris Fiscella. The duo's debut extended play (EP), The Ugly EP, was released on June 7, 2021. The EP featured the song "Shut Up My Moms Calling," which later gained popularity on video-sharing app TikTok.

In 2022, Chris left the duo, making Hotel Ugly the solo act of Mike. In late 2022 and early 2023, "Shut Up My Moms Calling" appeared on many worldwide charts, including the Billboard Hot 100. On March 24, 2023, Hotel Ugly's debut studio album, Ugly Duck, was released. The album included the single "Action Figures Fighting".

== Discography ==
=== Studio albums ===
Title	Album details
Ugly Duck	Released: March 24, 2023; Label: Self-released; Format: LP, digital download, streaming

=== Extended plays ===
Title	EP details
The Ugly EP	Released: June 7, 2021; Label: Self-released; Format: Digital download, streaming

=== Charted singles ===
Title	Year	Peak chart positions							Certifications	Album
Title	Year	US	CAN	IRE	NZ	SWE	SWI	UK	Certifications	Album
"Shut Up My Moms Calling"	2020	68	54	28	30	57	64	36	BPI: Platinum; RMNZ: 4× Platinum	The Ugly EP

=== Other singles ===
- "Mikey and the Frogs" (2020)
- "Applesauce" (2020)
- "2ugly" (2020)
- "Mice City" (2020)
- "Goose Neck" (2021)
- "Grandmother" (2021)
- "Piggypink" (2021)
- "The Ballad of Eddie Jabuley" (2021)
- "Sink Water" (2021)
- "Stevie Doesn't Wonder" (2021)
- "I Think I Left the Stove On" (2022)
- "The Mannequin Song" (2022)
- "Action Figures Fighting" (2023)
- "Fish Maan" (2023)
