= The Walters =

American music group

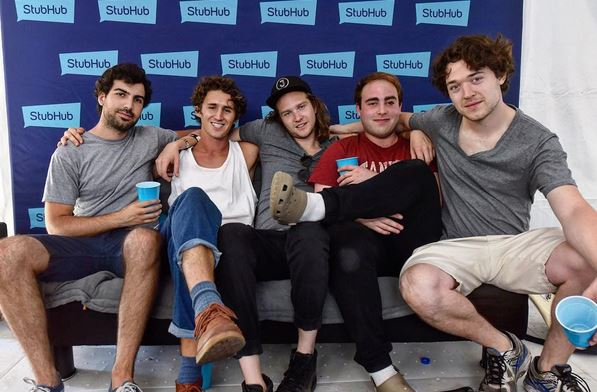
- The Walters in 2016

Background information
- Origin: Chicago, Illinois, United States
- Genres: Indie pop; indie rock
- Years active: 2014–2017, 2021–present
- Label: Warner
- Members: Luke Olson; Walter Kosner; Danny Wells; Charlie Ekhaus
- Past members: MJ Tirabassi
- Website: yourwalters.com

The Walters are an American indie pop band formed in 2014, from Chicago, Illinois, composed of lead vocalist Luke Olson, lead guitarist Walter Kosner, bassist Danny Wells, and drummer Charlie Ekhaus. They have released three EPs, one album, and had their first national tour in 2017.

== History ==
The Walters formed in Chicago, Illinois in 2014 after the band's guitarist and namesake Walter Kosner moved from Connecticut to Chicago to attend DePaul University. After dropping out of the school, Kosner recruited the rest of the band members who eventually would form The Walters. That same year, the band released their first recorded effort, Songs for Dads. The release saw the band charting on Spotify's United States Viral Top 50 which caught the attention of Canvasback Records. As part of the label's ongoing monthly singles series, Canvasclub, The Walters released two songs, entitled "Hunk Beach" and "I Want to Be Good".

In 2015, the band also recorded and independently released their second EP, Young Men. This was followed in 2017 by the single "She's Gonna Leave You". In 2017, the band began their first national tour and also performed at the Lollapalooza music festival. On September 23, the band announced via their Facebook page that they "currently had no future plans to release new music as The Walters".

Following the band's breakup, lead vocalist Luke Olson started a solo career under the moniker "L. Martin", while the remaining members formed a new band called Corduroy. In an April 2021 interview, Olson stated that "the band broke up with [him]" and that it was "a pretty tough pill to swallow." Olson later attributed the breakup to the band being burnt out and overwhelmed by their success at a young age, while rhythm guitarist MJ Tirabassi attributed the breakup to being unrecognized by the music industry.

In late 2021, their song "I Love You So" from the EP Songs for Dads went viral on TikTok, leading to the song earning nearly 4 million on-demand streams in the United States in the first week of November. On November 3, 2021, the band announced their reunion alongside a three-show tour running through December and subsequently signed with Warner Records. In an interview with Variety, Olson said that the band had been "flirting with the idea of reuniting" and that the success of "I Love You So" led to them officially reuniting. The sleeper hit went on to chart throughout 2021 and 2022 in 4 countries and other global charts, with the band also performing the song on Jimmy Kimmel Live! on January 28, 2022.

On April 14, 2022, the band released a new single, "Million Little Problems", their first original output since 2017. The single was accompanied by the announcement of their upcoming EP, Try Again, which was released May 6.

On June 2, 2023, the band announced a new single titled "Stuck In My Ways", with promotion featuring the band without rhythm guitarist MJ Tirabassi, signaling his departure.

In 2024, the band left Warner Records to go independent, in partnership with distributor and Artist Services company Amuse. On January 29, 2025, the band released a new single titled "Life On The Line", from their upcoming album Good Company, followed by Broken Hearts and Memories on February 26. On March 28, 2025, the full album was released internationally.

== Members ==
Current members

- Luke Olson – lead vocals, guitar (2014–2017, 2021–present)
- Walter Kosner – lead guitar (2014–2017, 2021–present)
- Danny Wells – bass (2014–2017, 2021–present)
- Charlie Ekhaus – drums (2014–2017, 2021–present)

Former members

- MJ Tirabassi – rhythm guitar, vocals (2014–2017, 2021–2023)

Touring members

- Luke Otwell – guitar, keyboards, backing vocals (2021–2022)
- Kris Hansen – keyboards, trumpet, backing vocals (2021–2022)
- Liam Jones – rhythm guitar, keyboards, backing vocals (2023–present)

== Discography ==
=== Albums ===
List of albums with title and details
Title	Album details
Good Company	Released: March 28, 2025; Label: Self-released; Formats: LP, CD, digital download, streaming
Good Company (Deluxe)	Released: October 24, 2025; Label: Self-released; Formats: LP, digital download, streaming

=== Extended plays ===
List of extended plays with title and details
Title	EP details
Songs for Dads	Released: November 28, 2014; Label: Self-released; Formats: LP, CD, digital download, streaming
Young Men	Released: December 23, 2015; Label: Self-released; Formats: LP, CD, digital download, streaming
Try Again	Released: May 6, 2022; Label: Warner; Formats: Digital download, streaming

=== Singles ===
Title	Year	Peak chart positions								Certifications	Album
Title	Year	US	US Rock	AUS	CAN	MLY	POR	UK	WW	Certifications	Album
"I Love You So"	2014	71	8	98	58	13	77	87	55	RIAA: 3× Platinum; AFP: Gold; BPI: Platinum; MC: 2× Platinum	Songs for Dads
"Hunk Beach" / "I Wanna Be Good"	2015	—	—	—	—	—	—	—	—		Non-album single
"Goodbye Baby"	2015	—	—	—	—	—	—	—	—		Young Men
"She's Gonna Leave You"	2017	—	—	—	—	—	—	—	—		Non-album single
"Million Little Problems"	2022	—	—	—	—	—	—	—	—		Try Again
"Another Christmas"	2022	—	—	—	—	—	—	—	—		Non-album single
"Stuck In My Ways"	2023	—	—	—	—	—	—	—	—		Non-album single
"By The Water"	2023	—	—	—	—	—	—	—	—		Non-album single
"Running Around / All Of Our Days"	2024	—	—	—	—	—	—	—	—		Non-album single
"Wishing Well"	2024	—	—	—	—	—	—	—	—		Non-album single
"Better Off Alone"	2024	—	—	—	—	—	—	—	—		Non-album single
"Life On The Line"	2025	—	—	—	—	—	—	—	—		Good Company
"Broken Hearts and Memories"	2025	—	—	—	—	—	—	—	—		Good Company
"Cheap Drugs"	2025	—	—	—	—	—	—	—	—		Good Company (Deluxe)
"Silver Screens"	2025	—	—	—	—	—	—	—	—		Good Company (Deluxe)
"Bodega"	2026	—	—	—	—	—	—	—	—		Non-album single
"Good Life"	2026	—	—	—	—	—	—	—	—		Non-album single
"—" denotes a title that did not chart, or was not released in that territory.
