= Olivia Rodrigo discography =

Discography of American singer-songwriter

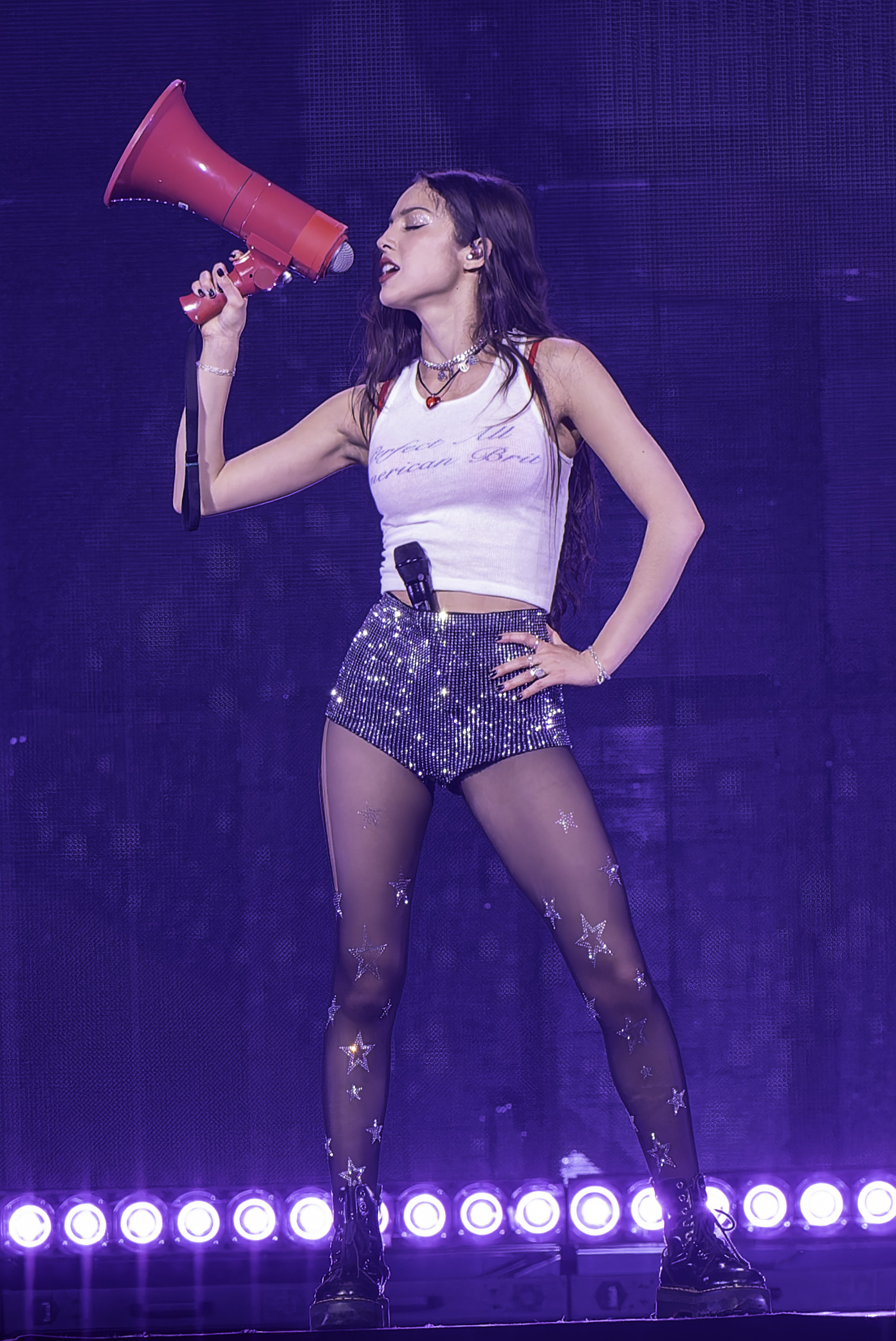
- Rodrigo in 2024
- Studio albums: 3
- EPs: 5
- Soundtrack albums: 3
- Live albums: 1
- Compilation albums: 1
- Singles: 16
- Music videos: 16

American singer-songwriter and actress Olivia Rodrigo has released three studio albums, one reissue, five extended plays (EPs), fourteen singles, and thirteen music videos. According to the Recording Industry Association of America (RIAA), Rodrigo has sold 37 million digital singles and 4 million albums in the United States. She contributed to the soundtrack of High School Musical: The Musical: The Series, releasing ten promotional singles from it, with "All I Want" managing to peak at number 90 on the US Billboard Hot 100. After signing with Interscope and Geffen Records in 2020, she released her debut single, "Drivers License", in January 2021, which propelled her to international fame. "Drivers License" debuted at number one on the Billboard Hot 100, where it stayed for eight consecutive weeks, and topped the charts in 25 other countries. It was certified six-times platinum in the US by the RIAA, eight-times platinum in Canada by Music Canada, seven-times platinum by the Australian Recording Industry Association (ARIA), triple platinum in Norway and Portugal, double platinum in United Kingdom, Poland, New Zealand, and Sweden, and platinum in 10 other countries.

Rodrigo released her second single "Deja Vu" in April 2021, which peaked at number three on the Billboard Hot 100 and was certified quadruple platinum in the US and Australia, triple platinum in Canada, and platinum in five other countries. She released her third single a month later with "Good 4 U", which also became a commercial success. It was her second chart-topper on the Billboard Hot 100 and reached number one in 23 countries. "Good 4 U" was certified six-times platinum in the United States, eight-times platinum in Australia and Canada, triple platinum in New Zealand, Portugal, and the UK, and platinum in another four countries.

In May 2021, Rodrigo released her debut album, Sour, which debuted atop the US Billboard 200. It was the second-best-selling album of 2021 and reached number one in 18 countries. Sour received various awards, including seven nominations and three wins at the 64th Annual Grammy Awards, and became the longest-running debut album in the top 10 of the Billboard 200 in the 21st century. Rodrigo became the first female artist, and the fourth act overall, to chart 11 songs in the Billboard Hot 100's top 30. She also became the first woman since Lady Gaga in 2009 to achieve at least four top-10s on the Billboard Pop Airplay chart from a debut album.

In 2023, Rodrigo released her sixth and seventh singles, "Vampire" and "Bad Idea Right?", which peaked at numbers one and seven, respectively. She then released her second album, Guts, which topped the Billboard 200, and her eighth single, "Get Him Back!", which peaked at number eleven on the Billboard Hot 100. In November, Rodrigo released the song "Can't Catch Me Now" for The Hunger Games: The Ballad of Songbirds & Snakes. In 2024, Rodrigo released her tenth single, "Obsessed", as part of the deluxe edition of Guts. Rodrigo's third album, You Seem Pretty Sad for a Girl So in Love, was released on June 12, 2026, and peaked at number one on the Billboard 200 for two weeks. It was preceded by two singles, "Drop Dead", which topped the charts in the US, the UK, Canada, Ireland, and Australia, and "The Cure", which reached number five in the US. "Stupid Song" was released alongside the album and debuted and peaked at number three in the US.

== Albums ==
=== Studio albums ===
List of studio albums
Title	Details	Peak chart positions										Sales	Certifications
Title	Details	US	AUS	CAN	DEN	IRL	NLD	NOR	NZ	SPA	UK	Sales	Certifications
Sour	Released: May 21, 2021; Label: Geffen; Format: Box set, cassette, CD, digital download, LP, streaming	1	1	1	1	1	1	1	1	1	1	US: 911,000; UK: 753,242	RIAA: 6× Platinum; ARIA: 4× Platinum; BPI: 4× Platinum; IFPI DEN: 4× Platinum; IFPI NOR: 3× Platinum; MC: 8× Platinum; NVPI: Diamond; PROMUSICAE: 2× Platinum; RMNZ: 6× Platinum
Guts	Released: September 8, 2023; Label: Geffen; Format: Box set, cassette, CD, digital download, LP, streaming	1	1	1	3	1	1	1	1	1	1	US: 579,000	RIAA: 3× Platinum; ARIA: 2× Platinum; BPI: 2× Platinum; IFPI DEN: Platinum; MC: 4× Platinum; PROMUSICAE: Platinum; RMNZ: 3× Platinum
You Seem Pretty Sad for a Girl So in Love	Released: June 12, 2026; Label: Geffen; Format: Cassette, CD, digital download, LP, streaming	1	1	1	1	1	1	2	1	1	1	US: 346,000; UK: 61,968	ARIA: Platinum; BPI: Platinum; IFPI DEN: Gold; MC: 2× Platinum; PROMUSICAE: Platinum; RMNZ: Platinum

=== Reissues ===
List of reissues
Title	Details	Peak chart positions		
Title	Details	ICE	NOR	NZ
Guts (Spilled)	Released: March 22, 2024; Format: CD, LP, digital download, streaming; Label: Geffen	36	10	3

=== Live albums ===
List of live albums
Title	Details	Peak chart positions				
Title	Details	US	AUS	IRL	NLD	UK
Live from Glastonbury (A BBC Recording)	Released: December 5, 2025; Label: Geffen; Format: CD, LP, digital download	47	11	27	9	12

=== Compilation albums ===
List of compilation albums
Title	Details
Best of High School Musical: The Series	Released: July 18, 2021; Label: Walt Disney; Format: Digital download, streaming

=== Soundtrack albums ===
List of soundtrack albums, with release date and label shown
Title	Album details	Peak chart positions		Certifications
Title	Album details	US	CAN	Certifications
High School Musical: The Musical: The Series: The Soundtrack	Released: January 10, 2020; Label: Walt Disney; Format: Digital download, streaming, CD	31	38	RIAA: Gold
High School Musical: The Musical: The Holiday Special: The Soundtrack	Released: November 20, 2020; Label: Walt Disney; Format: Digital download, streaming	—	—	
High School Musical: The Musical: The Series: The Soundtrack: Season 2	Released: July 30, 2021; Label: Walt Disney; Format: Digital download, streaming, CD	58	23	

== Extended plays ==
List of extended plays
Title	Details	Peak chart positions
Title	Details	US
Bizaardvark (Music from the TV Series) (with Madison Hu)	Released: October 7, 2016; Label: Walt Disney; Format: Digital download, streaming	—
Singles 4 You	Released: April 1, 2022; Label: Geffen; Format: Vinyl	—
Guts: The Secret Tracks	Released: November 24, 2023; Label: Geffen, Third Man; Format: Vinyl	200
Olivia Rodrigo & Noah Kahan (Note: Also promoted as Olivia Rodrigo "Stick Season"/Noah Kahan "Lacy" - From the BBC Radio 1 Live Lounge) (with Noah Kahan)	Released: April 20, 2024; Label: Geffen, Mercury, Republic; Format: Vinyl	—
Olivia x Weezer Live (Note: Also promoted as Olivia Rodrigo & Weezer Live @ Lolla") (with Weezer)	Released: December 19, 2025; Label: Geffen; Format: Vinyl	—

== Singles ==
List of singles
Title	Year	Peak chart positions										Sales	Certifications	Album
Title	Year	US	AUS	AUT	CAN	GER	IRL	NZ	SWI	UK	WW	Sales	Certifications	Album
"Drivers License"	2021	1	1	1	1	2	1	1	2	1	1	WW: 61,000 (Note: Total sales as per debut week outside the US and the UK.); US: 199,000 (Note: Digital Sales as per Billboard Midyear Report.); UK: 95,000 (Note: Sales combined with equivalent units as per debut week.)	RIAA: 6× Platinum; ARIA: 11× Platinum; BPI: 4× Platinum; BVMI: Platinum; IFPI AUT: 4× Platinum; IFPI SWI: Platinum; MC: 9× Platinum; RMNZ: 6× Platinum	Sour
"Deja Vu"	2021	3	3	25	4	55	2	3	35	4	3		RIAA: 4× Platinum; ARIA: 6× Platinum; BPI: 2× Platinum; BVMI: Gold; IFPI AUT: Platinum; MC: 8× Platinum; RMNZ: 4× Platinum	Sour
"Good 4 U"	2021	1	1	1	1	1	1	1	1	1	1	US: 12,000 (Note: Sales as per debut week.); UK: 1,390,000 (Note: Total British Sales as per December 2021)	RIAA: 7× Platinum; ARIA: 11× Platinum; BPI: 5× Platinum; BVMI: 3× Gold; IFPI AUT: 4× Platinum; MC: Diamond; RMNZ: 6× Platinum	Sour
"Traitor"	2021	9	5	—	9	—	3	5	95	5	7		RIAA: 4× Platinum; ARIA: 5× Platinum; BPI: 3× Platinum; BVMI: Gold; IFPI AUT: Platinum; MC: 8× Platinum; RMNZ: 4× Platinum	Sour
"Brutal"	2021	12	12	—	13	—	81	8	—	— (Note: "Brutal" did not enter the UK Singles Chart, but peaked at number eight on the UK Streaming Chart.)	11		RIAA: 2× Platinum; ARIA: 2× Platinum; BPI: Platinum; IFPI AUT: Gold; MC: 4× Platinum; RMNZ: Platinum	Sour
"Vampire"	2023	1	1	8	1	10	1	1	15	1	1	US: 30,640 (Note: Sales as latest records, and September 2023.); UK: 920,000 (Note: Equivalent units combined with sales as of February 2024)	RIAA: Platinum; ARIA: 5× Platinum; BPI: 3× Platinum; BVMI: Gold; IFPI AUT: Platinum; IFPI SWI: Gold; MC: 8× Platinum; RMNZ: 3× Platinum	Guts
"Bad Idea Right?"	2023	7	3	35	9	64	4	4	58	3	5	US: 3,160 (Note: Sales as per latest records.)	ARIA: 2× Platinum; BPI: Platinum; IFPI AUT: Gold; MC: 3× Platinum; RMNZ: Platinum	Guts
"Get Him Back!"	2023	11	6	52	11	78	5	5	86	7	7		ARIA: 2× Platinum; BPI: Platinum; MC: 2× Platinum; RMNZ: Platinum	Guts
"Can't Catch Me Now"	2023	56	23	66	42	83	5	15	56	12	43		ARIA: Platinum; BPI: Platinum; IFPI AUT: Gold; MC: Platinum; RMNZ: Platinum	The Hunger Games: The Ballad of Songbirds & Snakes
"Obsessed"	2024	14	16	73	20	—	12	26	—	10	17		ARIA: Platinum; BPI: Gold; MC: Platinum; RMNZ: Gold	Guts (Spilled)
"Drop Dead"	2026	1	1	3	1	4	1	3	6	1	1	WW: 41,000 (Note: Debut week digital sales.); US: 54,000 (Note: Pure sales as per April, and June 2026.)	ARIA: Platinum; BPI: Platinum; IFPI SWI: Gold; MC: 2× Platinum; RMNZ: Platinum	You Seem Pretty Sad for a Girl So in Love
"The Cure"	2026	5	1	6	6	8	1	4	16	2	2	US: 9,000 (Note: Combined sales for the United States as per debut week, and latest records.)	ARIA: Platinum; BPI: Platinum; MC: 2× Platinum; RMNZ: Platinum	You Seem Pretty Sad for a Girl So in Love
"Stupid Song"	2026	3	1	3	2	6	1	1	4	2	1	WW: 3,000 (Note: Digital downloads as per debut week.); US: 2,000 (Note: Sales as per debut week (June 2026).)	ARIA: Platinum; BPI: Gold; MC: 2× Platinum; RMNZ: Gold	You Seem Pretty Sad for a Girl So in Love
"Serena Joy"	2026	63	77	—	64	—	—	— (Note: "Serena Joy" did not enter the NZ Top 40 Singles Chart, but peaked at number two on the NZ Hot Singles Chart.)	—	52	137			Non-album single
"Expectations" (solo or remix featuring Chappell Roan)	2026	3	2	4	6	9	2	6	20	3	2		BPI: Silver; MC: Gold; RMNZ: Gold	You Seem Pretty Sad for a Girl So in Love
"Take Me Home (4 Christmas)"	2026	32	—	67	44	6	13	— (Note: "Take Me Home (4 Christmas)" did not enter the NZ Top 40 Singles Chart, but peaked at number one on the NZ Hot Singles Chart.)	—	8	80			Non-album single
"—" denotes songs which did not chart in that country.

=== Promotional singles ===
List of promotional singles
Title	Year	Peak chart positions										Certifications	Album
Title	Year	US	AUS	CAN	IRL	NOR	NZ Hot	POR	SWE	UK	WW	Certifications	Album
"Let It Glow" (with Madison Hu)	2016	—	—	—	—	—	—	—	—	—	—		Non-album promotional single
"I Think I Kinda, You Know" (with Joshua Bassett)	2019	—	—	—	—	—	—	—	—	—	—		High School Musical: The Musical: The Series: The Soundtrack
"Wondering" (with Julia Lester)	2019	—	—	—	77	—	—	—	—	—	—	RIAA: Platinum; ARIA: Gold	High School Musical: The Musical: The Series: The Soundtrack
"All I Want"	2019	90	—	78	16	—	19	111	88	32	119	RIAA: 3× Platinum; AFP: Gold; ARIA: 3× Platinum; BPI: Platinum; GLF: Gold; MC: 4× Platinum; RMNZ: 2× Platinum	High School Musical: The Musical: The Series: The Soundtrack
"Out of the Old"	2019	—	—	—	—	—	—	—	—	—	—		High School Musical: The Musical: The Series: The Soundtrack
"Just for a Moment" (with Joshua Bassett)	2020	—	—	—	—	—	32	—	—	—	—		High School Musical: The Musical: The Series: The Soundtrack
"Even When/The Best Part" (with Joshua Bassett)	2021	—	—	—	—	—	33	—	—	—	—		High School Musical: The Musical: The Series: The Soundtrack: Season 2
"The Best Part"	2021	—	—	—	—	—	—	—	—	—	—		High School Musical: The Musical: The Series: The Soundtrack: Season 2
"YAC Alma Mater"	2021	—	—	—	—	—	—	—	—	—	—		High School Musical: The Musical: The Series: The Soundtrack: Season 2
"Granted"	2021	—	—	—	—	—	—	—	—	—	—		High School Musical: The Musical: The Series: The Soundtrack: Season 2
"The Rose Song"	2021	—	—	—	—	—	11	—	—	—	—		High School Musical: The Musical: The Series: The Soundtrack: Season 2
"Friday I'm in Love"/"Just Like Heaven" (with Robert Smith)	2025	—	—	—	—	—	—	—	—	— (Note: "Friday I'm In Love" did not enter the UK Singles Chart, but peaked at number 1 on the UK Physical Singles Chart and at number 5 on the UK Singles Sales Chart.)	—		Live from Glastonbury (A BBC Recording)
"Honeybee"	2026	9	7	9	22	57	2	—	83	30	5	AFP: Gold; BPI: Silver; MC: Platinum	You Seem Pretty Sad for a Girl So in Love
"Cigarette Smoke"	2026	27	22	30	—	—	— (Note: "Cigarette Smoke" did not enter the New Zealand Hot 40 Singles, but peaked at number 25 on the New Zealand Official Top 40 Singles.)	—	—	—	27		You Seem Pretty Sad for a Girl So in Love
"Purple"	2026	25	19	27	—	—	— (Note: "Purple" did not enter the New Zealand Hot 40 Singles, but peaked at number 26 on the New Zealand Official Top 40 Singles.)	—	— (Note: "Purple" did not enter the Swedish Singellista Chart, but peaked at number 16 on the Swedish Heatseeker Chart.)	—	23	MC: Gold	You Seem Pretty Sad for a Girl So in Love
"—" denotes songs which did not chart in that country.

== Other charted and certified songs ==
List of other charted songs
Title	Year	Peak chart positions										Certifications	Album
Title	Year	US	AUS	CAN	IRL	NOR	NZ	SPA	SWE	UK	WW	Certifications	Album
"1 Step Forward, 3 Steps Back"	2021	19	18	17	—	—	26	—	— (Note: "1 Step Forward, 3 Steps Back" did not enter the Swedish Singellista Chart, but peaked at number 11 on the Swedish Heatseeker Chart.)	— (Note: "1 Step Forward, 3 Steps Back" did not enter the UK Singles Chart, but peaked at number 19 on the UK Streaming Chart.)	17	RIAA: Platinum; ARIA: 2× Platinum; BPI: Platinum; MC: 3× Platinum; PROMUSICAE: Gold; RMNZ: Platinum	Sour
"Enough for You"	2021	14	14	14	—	—	21	89	89	— (Note: "Enough for You" did not enter the UK Singles Chart, but peaked at number 15 on the UK Streaming Chart.)	13	RIAA: Platinum; ARIA: Platinum; BPI: Gold; MC: 3× Platinum; PROMUSICAE: Gold; RMNZ: Platinum	Sour
"Happier"	2021	15	15	15	—	28	14	92	— (Note: "Happier" did not enter the Swedish Singellista Chart, but peaked at number two on the Swedish Heatseeker Chart.)	— (Note: "Happier" did not enter the UK Singles Chart, but peaked at number 18 on the UK Streaming Chart.)	14	RIAA: 2× Platinum; ARIA: 2× Platinum; BPI: Platinum; IFPI NOR: Gold; MC: 4× Platinum; PROMUSICAE: Platinum; RMNZ: 2× Platinum	Sour
"Jealousy, Jealousy"	2021	24	22	21	32	—	33	—	— (Note: "Jealousy, Jealousy" did not enter the Swedish Singellista Chart, but peaked at number 15 on the Swedish Heatseeker Chart.)	36	19	RIAA: 2× Platinum; ARIA: 2× Platinum; BPI: Platinum; MC: 4× Platinum; PROMUSICAE: Gold; RMNZ: Platinum	Sour
"Favorite Crime"	2021	16	13	14	8	21	6	—	76	17	14	RIAA: 3× Platinum; ARIA: 3× Platinum; BPI: Platinum; IFPI NOR: Gold; MC: 5× Platinum; PROMUSICAE: Platinum; RMNZ: 3× Platinum	Sour
"Hope Ur OK"	2021	29	23	23	—	—	—	—	—	— (Note: "Hope Ur OK" did not enter the UK Singles Chart, but peaked at number 32 on the UK Streaming Chart.)	22	RIAA: Platinum; ARIA: Platinum; BPI: Gold; MC: 2× Platinum; RMNZ: Platinum	Sour
"All-American Bitch"	2023	13	10	15	—	—	7	—	— (Note: "All-American Bitch" did not enter the Swedish Singellista Chart, but peaked at number seven on the Swedish Heatseeker Chart.)	78	9	ARIA: Platinum; BPI: Gold; MC: 2× Platinum; RMNZ: Gold	Guts
"Lacy"	2023	23	25	24	51	—	16	—	—	— (Note: "Lacy" did not enter the UK Singles Chart, but peaked at number 26 on the UK Streaming Chart.)	20	ARIA: Platinum; BPI: Gold; MC: 2× Platinum; RMNZ: Platinum	Guts
"Ballad of a Homeschooled Girl"	2023	24	22	25	93	—	18	—	—	— (Note: "Ballad of a Homeschooled Girl" did not enter the UK Singles Chart, but peaked at number 20 on the UK Streaming Chart.)	21	ARIA: Gold; BPI: Silver; MC: Platinum; RMNZ: Gold	Guts
"Making the Bed"	2023	19	18	20	—	—	13	—	—	— (Note: "Making the Bed" did not enter the UK Singles Chart, but peaked at number 19 on the UK Streaming Chart.)	16	ARIA: Gold; BPI: Gold; MC: Platinum; RMNZ: Gold	Guts
"Logical"	2023	20	21	26	—	—	21	—	— (Note: "Logical" did not enter the Swedish Singellista Chart, but peaked at number 17 on the Swedish Heatseeker Chart.)	— (Note: "Logical" did not enter the UK Singles Chart, but peaked at number 23 on the UK Streaming Chart.)	19	ARIA: Gold; BPI: Silver; MC: Platinum; RMNZ: Gold	Guts
"Love Is Embarrassing"	2023	25	26	29	84	—	23	—	— (Note: "Love Is Embarrassing" did not enter the Swedish Singellista Chart, but peaked at number 14 on the Swedish Heatseeker Chart.)	— (Note: "Love Is Embarrassing" did not enter the UK Singles Chart, but peaked at number 24 on the UK Streaming Chart.)	22	ARIA: Platinum; BPI: Gold; MC: Platinum; RMNZ: Gold	Guts
"The Grudge"	2023	16	13	18	6	—	10	—	— (Note: "The Grudge" did not enter the Swedish Singellista Chart, but peaked at number two on the Swedish Heatseeker Chart.)	45	14	ARIA: Platinum; BPI: Gold; MC: 2× Platinum; RMNZ: Gold	Guts
"Pretty Isn't Pretty"	2023	30	28	35	—	—	28	—	—	— (Note: "Pretty Isn't Pretty" did not enter the UK Singles Chart, but peaked at number 32 on the UK Streaming Chart.)	30	ARIA: Gold; BPI: Silver; MC: Platinum; RMNZ: Gold	Guts
"Teenage Dream"	2023	39	39	40	—	—	34	—	—	— (Note: "Teenage Dream" did not enter the UK Singles Chart, but peaked at number 42 on the UK Streaming Chart.)	46	ARIA: Gold; BPI: Silver; MC: Platinum	Guts
"Girl I've Always Been"	2024	99	—	91	—	—	— (Note: "Girl I've Always Been" did not enter the NZ Top 40 Singles Chart, but peaked at number 14 on the NZ Hot Singles Chart.)	—	—	— (Note: "Girl I've Always Been" did not enter the UK Singles Chart but debuted and peaked at number 49 on the UK Singles Downloads Chart.)	—		Guts (Spilled)
"Stranger"	2024	75	—	67	32	—	— (Note: "Stranger" did not enter the NZ Top 40 Singles Chart, but peaked at number 12 on the NZ Hot Singles Chart.)	—	—	58	142	MC: Gold	Guts (Spilled)
"So American"	2024	58	76	52	18	—	— (Note: "So American" did not enter the NZ Top 40 Singles Chart, but peaked at number 10 on the NZ Hot Singles Chart.)	—	—	24	66	ARIA: Gold; BPI: Silver; MC: Platinum; RMNZ: Gold	Guts (Spilled)
"Scared of My Guitar"	2024	90	—	83	—	—	—	—	—	— (Note: "Scared of My Guitar" did not enter the UK Singles Chart but debuted and peaked at number 52 on the UK Singles Downloads Chart.)	—	MC: Gold	Guts (Spilled)
"Maggots for Brains"	2026	12	9	11	—	—	13	—	— (Note: "Maggots for Brains" did not enter the Swedish Singellista Chart, but peaked at number 1 on the Swedish Heatseeker Chart.)	—	8	BPI: Silver; MC: Platinum	You Seem Pretty Sad for a Girl So in Love
"U + Me = ＜3"	2026	19	16	19	—	—	15	—	— (Note: "U + Me = <3" did not enter the Swedish Singellista Chart, but peaked at number 7 on the Swedish Heatseeker Chart.)	—	13		You Seem Pretty Sad for a Girl So in Love
"My Way"	2026	15	13	17	—	—	12	—	— (Note: "My Way" did not enter the Swedish Singellista Chart, but peaked at number 3 on the Swedish Heatseeker Chart.)	—	10	MC: Gold	You Seem Pretty Sad for a Girl So in Love
"Begged"	2026	16	10	15	—	—	10	—	— (Note: "Begged" did not enter the Swedish Singellista Chart, but peaked at number 6 on the Swedish Heatseeker Chart.)	—	12	MC: Gold	You Seem Pretty Sad for a Girl So in Love
"What's Wrong with Me" (with Robert Smith)	2026	17	12	18	—	—	18	—	— (Note: "What's Wrong with Me" did not enter the Swedish Singellista Chart, but peaked at number 2 on the Swedish Heatseeker Chart.)	—	11		You Seem Pretty Sad for a Girl So in Love
"Less"	2026	21	15	20	—	—	11	—	— (Note: "Less" did not enter the Swedish Singellista Chart, but peaked at number 9 on the Swedish Heatseeker Chart.)	—	16		You Seem Pretty Sad for a Girl So in Love
"—" denotes songs which did not chart in that country.

== Guest appearances ==
List of non-single guest appearances, with other performing artists, showing year released and album name
Title	Year	Other artist(s)	Album
"The Book of Love"	2026	none	Help(2)

== Music videos ==
List of music videos, with year released and directors shown
Title	Year	Director(s)	Ref.
"All I Want"	2020	Stephen Wayne Mallett	
"Drivers License"	2021	Matthew Dillon Cohen	
"Deja Vu"	2021	Allie Avital	
"Good 4 U"	2021	Petra Collins	
"Brutal"	2021	Petra Collins	
"Traitor"	2021	Olivia Bee	
"Vampire"	2023	Petra Collins	
"Bad Idea Right?"	2023	Petra Collins	
"Get Him Back!"	2023	Jack Begert	
"Can't Catch Me Now"	2023	Leonn Ward	
"Obsessed"	2024	Mitch Ryan	
"Drop Dead"	2026	Petra Collins	
"The Cure"	2026	Cat Solen & Jaime Gerin	
"Stupid Song"	2026	Mitch Ryan	
"Expectations" (featuring Chappell Roan)	2026	Bardia Zenali	
"Take Me Home (4 Christmas)"	2026	Fiona Jane Burgess	

=== Guest appearances ===
List of other appearances in music videos, with year released and directors shown
Title	Year	Artist(s)	Director(s)	Note(s)	Ref.
"Disney Channel Stars: DuckTales Theme Song"	2017	Various	Kerri-Anne Lavin	Cameo appearance	
"Monday"	2021	The Regrettes	Dillon Dowdell	Cameo appearance as "DJ"	
