= Live from Glastonbury (A BBC Recording) =

Live album by Olivia Rodrigo
- Released: December 5, 2025
- Recorded: June 29, 2025
- Venues: Worthy Farm, Pilton, Glastonbury, England
- Genre: Pop-punk
- Length: 84:45
- Label: Geffen

Olivia Rodrigo chronology
Guts (2023)	Live from Glastonbury (A BBC Recording) (2025)	You Seem Pretty Sad for a Girl So in Love (2026)

Live from Glastonbury (A BBC Recording) is the first live album by American singer-songwriter Olivia Rodrigo. It was recorded during her Sunday night headline slot at the Glastonbury Festival on June 29, 2025, and it was released on December 5, 2025.

== Background ==
Rodrigo was announced as one of the headliners for the 2025 edition of the Glastonbury Festival on March 6, 2025. The performance marked her second appearance at the festival, following her debut in 2022 on the Other Stage.

Her headline set took place on June 29, 2025, during the festival's closing night on the Pyramid Stage. The show featured a special guest appearance by Robert Smith of the Cure, with whom Rodrigo performed renditions of "Just like Heaven" and "Friday I'm in Love" in addition to her own material.

The performance was met with widespread acclaim from critics. The Guardian gave the show a five-star review and named it the weekend’s best big set, while Rolling Stone, The Independent and the BBC also praised Rodrigo's stage presence.

== Release and promotion ==
On September 8, 2025, Rodrigo announced the live album of her Glastonbury 2025 performance, titled Live from Glastonbury (A BBC Recording). On the same day, she released the double promotional single "Friday I'm in Love" and "Just Like Heaven" with Robert Smith on digital platforms, with it also being announced that proceeds from both tracks were to be donated to charity organization Doctors Without Borders. The single reached number-one on the UK Physical Singles Chart.

== Track listing ==
All tracks are written by Olivia Rodrigo and Dan Nigro, except where noted.

Live from Glastonbury (A BBC Recording) track listing
No.	Title	Writer(s)	Length
1.	"Obsessed"	Rodrigo; Annie Clark; Nigro	5:24
2.	"Ballad of a Homeschooled Girl"		3:29
3.	"Vampire"		4:45
4.	"Drivers License"		4:36
5.	"Traitor"		3:37
6.	"Bad Idea Right?"		3:46
7.	"Love Is Embarrassing"		3:21
8.	"Pretty Isn't Pretty"	Rodrigo; Nigro; Amy Allen	3:38
9.	"Happier"	Rodrigo	3:39
10.	"Enough for You"	Rodrigo	4:37
11.	"Friday I'm in Love" (with Robert Smith)	Perry Bamonte; Boris Williams; Simon Gallup; Robert Smith; Porl Thompson	4:30
12.	"Just like Heaven" (with Robert Smith)	Smith; Gallup; Thompson; B. Williams; Lol Tolhurst	4:28
13.	"So American"		6:16
14.	"Jealousy, Jealousy"	Rodrigo; Nigro; Casey Smith	3:03
15.	"Favorite Crime"		2:39
16.	"Deja Vu"	Rodrigo; Nigro; Taylor Swift; Jack Antonoff; Clark	4:20
17.	"Brutal"		4:35
18.	"All-American Bitch"		5:14
19.	"Good 4 U"	Rodrigo; Nigro; Hayley Williams; Josh Farro	3:34
20.	"Get Him Back!"		5:15
Total length:			84:45

== Personnel ==
=== Musicians ===
- Olivia Rodrigo – vocals, guitar (tracks 1, 8, 10-13), piano (4 & 5)
- Camila Mora – keyboards, background vocals
- Daisy Spencer – guitar, background vocals
- Arianna Powell – guitar, background vocals
- Jordan Radnoti – drums, background vocals
- Camilla Charlesworth – bass, background vocals
- Robert Smith – additional vocals, and additional guitar (11 and 12)

=== Technical ===
- Brian Pomp – mixing engineer
- Randy Merrill – mastering engineer

== Charts ==
Chart performance for Live from Glastonbury (A BBC Recording)
Chart (2025–2026)	Peak position
Australian Albums (ARIA)	11
Austrian Albums (Ö3 Austria)	14
Belgian Albums (Ultratop Flanders)	13
Belgian Albums (Ultratop Wallonia)	26
Croatian International Albums (HDU)	32
Dutch Albums (Album Top 100)	9
French Albums (SNEP)	87
German Albums (Offizielle Top 100)	15
German Pop Albums (Offizielle Top 100)	6
Greek Albums (IFPI)	34
Irish Albums (Official Charts)	27
Japanese Western Albums (Oricon)	17
Portuguese Albums (AFP)	33
Scottish Albums (Official Charts)	3
Spanish Albums (Promusicae)	21
Swiss Albums (Schweizer Hitparade)	36
UK Albums (Official Charts)	12
US Billboard 200	47
US Top Rock & Alternative Albums (Billboard)	7

== Release history ==
Release date and format for Live from Glastonbury (A BBC Recording)
Region	Date	Format	Label	Ref.
Various	December 5, 2025	Digital download; vinyl LP; CD	Geffen	
