= Logical (song) =

2023 song by Olivia Rodrigo

Song by Olivia Rodrigo

from the album Guts
- Released: September 8, 2023
- Studio: Amusement (Los Angeles); Skylight (Los Angeles)
- Length: 3:51
- Label: Geffen
- Songwriters: Olivia Rodrigo; Julia Michaels; Dan Nigro
- Producer: Dan Nigro

Lyric video
- "Logical" on YouTube

"Logical" (stylized in all lowercase) is a song by American singer-songwriter Olivia Rodrigo from her second studio album, Guts (2023). Rodrigo wrote it with songwriter Julia Michaels and its producer, Dan Nigro. The song became available as the album's seventh track on September 8, 2023, when it was released by Geffen Records. An up-tempo piano ballad which incorporates a layer of synthesizers, "Logical" recounts Rodrigo's relationship with an older man who used to manipulate her and the resulting emotional turmoil.

Music critics considered "Logical" one of the best tracks on Guts and praised its lyricism and Rodrigo's vocal performance; Rolling Stone ranked it as her sixth-best song in September 2023. It reached the top 30 in Australia, Canada, Ireland, New Zealand, and the United States and entered the charts in some other countries. The song received a platinum certification in Canada and gold certifications in Australia and Brazil. Rodrigo included "Logical" on the set list of her 2024–2025 concert tour, the Guts World Tour.

== Background and release ==
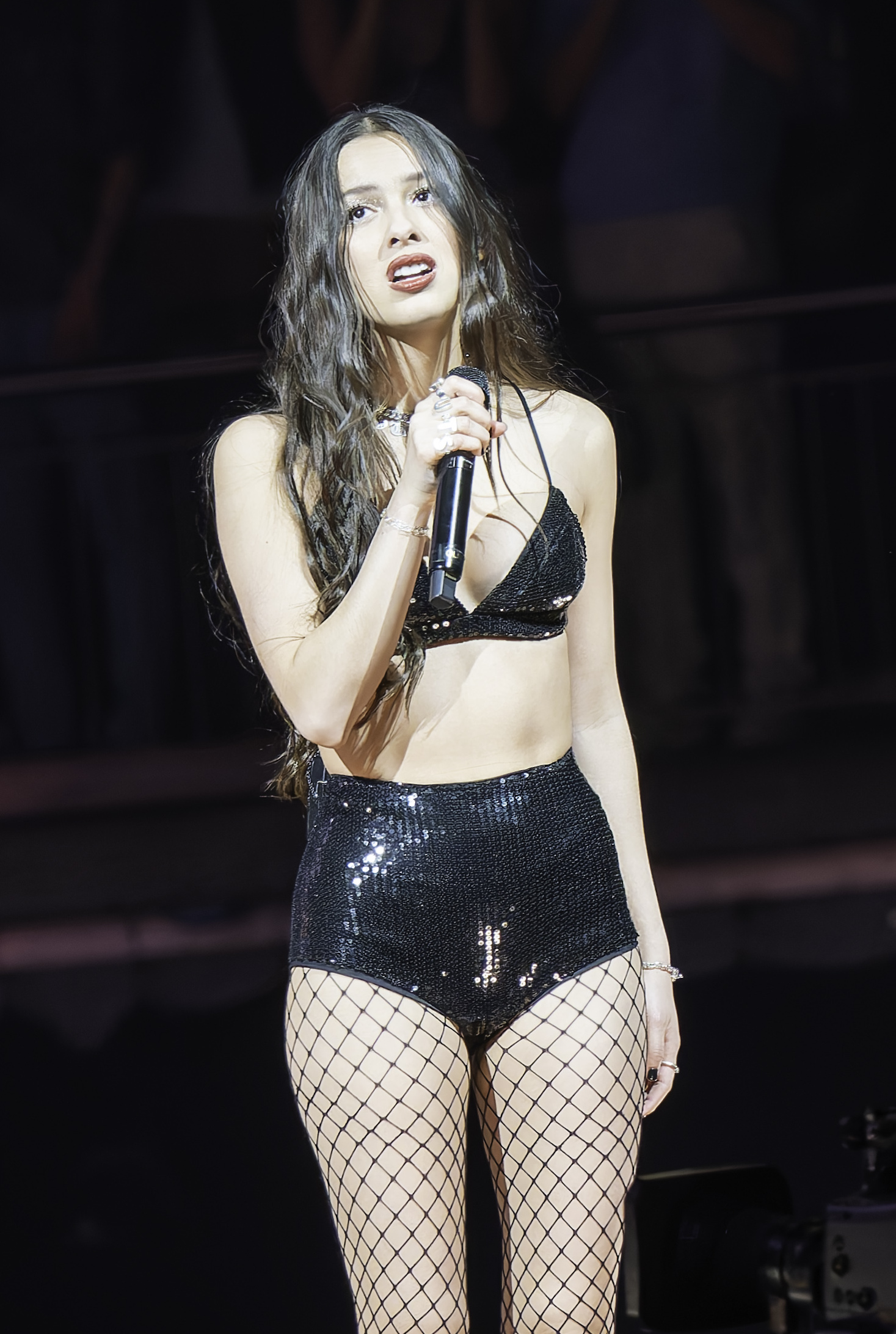
Olivia Rodrigo performing on the Guts World Tour in May 2024

Olivia Rodrigo's debut studio album, Sour (2021), was released in May 2021, following which she took a break from songwriting for six months. She conceived the follow-up album, Guts (2023), at the age of 19, while experiencing "lots of confusion, mistakes, awkwardness & good old fashioned teen angst". Sour's producer, Dan Nigro, returned to produce every track on it. They wrote over 100 songs and included the more rock-oriented tracks on the album because they drew a bigger reaction from her audiences during live shows.

Guts was created over a period of 10 months, with songwriting and recording consuming the first eight and the final two being used for mixing and fine-tuning. After completing a set of gleeful and up-tempo songs for the album, Rodrigo and Nigro decided to create something more serious. They wrote the song "Logical" with songwriter Julia Michaels. It was inspired by Rodrigo's friend and Bizaardvark co-star Madison Hu, when she said, "It's just not logical, it's just not logical," while discussing one of her relationships with her during a night out. "Logical" is one of just two tracks on the final tracklist of Guts to feature a songwriter other than Rodrigo and Nigro. Rodrigo announced the album title on June 26, 2023, and its lead single, "Vampire", was released four days later. On August 1, 2023, she revealed Guts's tracklist, which features "Logical" as the seventh track. The song became available for digital download on the album, which was released on September 8, 2023.

"Logical" was included on the set list of Rodrigo's 2024–2025 concert tour, the Guts World Tour. She performs it before "Enough for You" while sitting on a huge crescent moon prop that suspends from the ceiling, while waving to everyone in the audience, in what The Seattle Times's Michael Rietmulder described as a "folk-pop acoustic run". It was considered one of the highlights of the show by several critics. (Note: like Sarah John of Nylon, Rania Aniftos of Billboard, Audrey Gibbs of The Tennessean, and Melissa Ruggieri of USA Today) Grammy writer Kelly Nguyen opined this was among the more saddening moments, and Detroit Free Press's Brian McCollum called the inclusion of the moon the "fanciest frill". Writing for the Chicago Tribune, Bob Gendron observed that it was the show's only moment of high production as the rest of it was mostly simplistic. Los Angeles Times's Mikael Wood called it a charmingly playful exaggeration of the typical pop-star confession, and St. Louis Post-Dispatch's Kevin C. Johnson believed it was an oft-used trope for young female pop singers but one which was timeless.

== Composition ==
"Logical" is 3 minutes and 51 seconds long. Nigro handled production and vocal production, and he engineered it with Ryan Linvill, Chris Kasych, and the assistant Austen Healey. Nigro plays acoustic guitar, piano, and synthesizer; Linvill plays acoustic guitar, saxophone, bass, synthesizer, and Moog bass; and Benjamin Romans plays piano. Serban Ghenea handled mixing at MixStar Studios in Virginia Beach, Virginia, with assistance from Bryce Bordone, and Randy Merrill helmed mastering. Recording took place at Amusement Studios and Skylight Studios in Los Angeles.

"Logical" is an up-tempo piano ballad, which is one of just two traditional romantic ballads on Guts according to DIY's Lisa Wright. The song's minimalistic piano instrumentation gradually layers new elements and pulls back at key moments, maximizing emotional impact according to Jason Lipshutz of Billboard, before incorporating a drooping layer of synthesizers towards the end. Rodrigo uses different vocal tones on it, singing gently and delicately in some parts but her voice trembling and choking with anger during the lyric: "Said I was too young, I was too soft/Can't take a joke, can't get you off."

"Logical" recounts Rodrigo's relationship with an older man who used to manipulate her and the resulting emotional turmoil. According to Slant Magazine's Charles Lyons-Burt, the song initially comes across as sincere but is infused with a deep, wounded sarcasm. Rodrigo describes the man as a "master manipulator", expressing her pain and anger as she reflects on the power dynamics between them. She makes several hyperbolic equivalences in the lyrics, comparing the way she "fell" for him to rainfall in February and the possibility of changing him to the probability that it never rains again and the sun stops shining. Rodrigo likens the irrationality of her believing that he really loved her to someone thinking that "two plus two equals five". Later, she recalls how he would gaslight her about several things: "Said I was too young, I was too soft/Can't take a joke, can't get you off." Rodrigo neglects these warning signs due to her love for him. Towards the song's conclusion, she admits her regrets and horror about the fact that she was "half responsible" for what happened and wonders why she did not end the abusive relationship sooner.

== Critical reception ==
Multiple critics considered "Logical" one of the best songs on Guts. Lyons-Burt and The New York Times's Lindsay Zoladz picked it as a highlight. Rolling Stone's Rob Sheffield considered the emotional piano ballads the best moments of the album in general, and he named the song as the most powerful and moving one among them. Similarly, Ilana Kaplan of Spin cited it among the scathing ballads that were Guts's standout tracks and demonstrated Rodrigo's versatility as a contemporary star. Caramanica thought the song displayed Rodrigo's remarkably pure songwriting which captured raw emotions even in the most stylized lyrics. Heather Phares of AllMusic opined that it showcased an increase in her wisdom and injected a refreshing sense of self-awareness into the catharsis of "Drivers License". Punch Liwanag of the Manila Bulletin named it as a reflective track where Rodrigo delved into her inner thoughts.

On the other hand, The Australian's Jules LeFevre believed "Logical" was forgettable, and Vulture's Craig Jenkins thought it felt "a bit mechanical". Though he considered the ballads the songs where Rodrigo's straightforwardness can be vexing, Spencer Kornhaber of The Atlantic thought the song was one of the better ones. Gabriel Saulog of Billboard Philippines thought it was a considerable improvement but still leaned into the sound of the weaker tracks on Sour. Writing for Pitchfork, Cat Zhang believed Guts's ballads were not inherently bad but regurgitated Rodrigo's prior material compared to other tracks on the album, which demonstrated a greater increase in self-awareness.

Sheffield ranked "Logical" as Rodrigo's sixth-best song in September 2023 and picked his favorite lyric: "Loving you is loving every argument you held over my head/You brought up the girls you could have instead." Sputnikmusic's Sowing believed the lyric in which Rodrigo declared herself half responsible was one of the quotable lines of Guts. GQ included "And now you got me thinkin'/Two plus two equals five" in its list of the album's standout and "gutsiest" lyrics, and Nylon included "I fell for you like water/ that falls from the February sky/ but now the current's stronger/ and I couldn't get out if I tried" in its list of Guts's most impeccable lyrics. Celia Almeida of Miami New Times listed the lyric where the older man attacks Rodrigo for being too young and inexperienced among Rodrigo's five most "scathing" ones.

Critics praised Rodrigo's vocal performance on "Logical". Lucas Martins of Beats Per Minute believed the gripping intensity of her voice combined with the hyperbolic equivalences in the song's lyrics to evoke a sense of overwhelming shame unlike anything Rodrigo had expressed before—her pain laid bare—vulnerable and raw, with nothing concealed, resulting in a truly remarkable performance. Writing for Consequence, Paolo Ragusa believed it would perfectly fit a Broadway musical's second act, due to Rodrigo delivering intensifying dynamics charged with both power and confusion.

== Commercial performance ==
"Logical" debuted at number 20 on the US Billboard Hot 100 issued for September 23, 2023. In Canada, the song entered at number 26 on the Canadian Hot 100 issued for the same date and was certified platinum by Music Canada. In the United Kingdom, it debuted at number 23 on the Official Audio Streaming Chart and number 22 on Billboard. In Australia, "Logical" entered at number 21 and received a gold certification from the Australian Recording Industry Association. The song debuted at number 21 in New Zealand. It charted at number 19 on the Billboard Global 200. "Logical" also reached national record charts at number 16 in Ireland, number 50 in Portugal, and number 56 in Greece. Additionally, the song peaked at number 17 on the Sweden Heatseeker chart and received a gold certification in Brazil.

== Credits and personnel ==
Credits are adapted from the liner notes of Guts.

- Dan Nigro – producer, songwriter, engineer, acoustic guitar, piano, vocal producer, synthesizer, background vocals
- Olivia Rodrigo – vocals, background vocals, songwriter
- Julia Michaels – songwriter
- Ryan Linvill – additional producer, engineer, acoustic guitar, saxophone, bass, synthesizer, Moog bass, background vocals
- Benjamin Romans – piano
- Chris Kasych – engineer
- Austen Healey – record engineering assistance
- Randy Merrill – mastering
- Serban Ghenea – mixing
- Bryce Bordone – mixing assistance

== Charts ==
Chart positions for "Logical"
Chart (2023)	Peak position
Australia (ARIA)	21
Canada Hot 100 (Billboard)	26
Global 200 (Billboard)	19
Greece (IFPI)	56
Ireland (Billboard)	16
New Zealand (Recorded Music NZ)	21
Portugal (AFP)	50
Sweden Heatseeker (Sverigetopplistan)	17
UK (Billboard)	22
UK Streaming (OCC)	23
US Billboard Hot 100	20

== Certifications ==
Certifications for "Logical"
Region	Certification	Certified units/sales
Australia (ARIA)	Platinum	70,000^{‡}
Brazil (Pro-Música Brasil)	Platinum	40,000^{‡}
Canada (Music Canada)	Platinum	80,000^{‡}
New Zealand (RMNZ)	Gold	15,000^{‡}
United Kingdom (BPI)	Silver	200,000^{‡}
^{‡} Sales+streaming figures based on certification alone.
