= Guts (album) =

2023 studio album by Olivia Rodrigo

- Standard cover

Studio album by Olivia Rodrigo
- Released: September 8, 2023
- Recorded: 2022–2023
- Studios: Amusement (Los Angeles); East West (Los Angeles); Electric Lady (New York City); Skylight (Los Angeles)
- Genres: Pop; rock; pop-punk; pop rock; alt-pop; indie pop
- Length: 39:18
- Label: Geffen
- Producer: Dan Nigro

Olivia Rodrigo chronology
Sour (2021)	Guts (2023)	Live from Glastonbury (A BBC Recording) (2025)

Singles from Guts
- 1. "Vampire" Released: June 30, 2023; 2. "Bad Idea Right?" Released: August 11, 2023; 3. "Get Him Back!" Released: September 15, 2023

Singles from Guts (Spilled)
- 1. "Obsessed" Released: March 22, 2024

Guts (stylized in all caps) is the second studio album by American singer-songwriter Olivia Rodrigo, released on September 8, 2023, through Geffen Records. It was written and recorded with Rodrigo working closely alongside Dan Nigro, the producer and multi-instrumentalist of her debut album Sour (2021). Inspired by the period of time immediately following Sour's success, Rodrigo conceived Guts hoping to reflect the process of maturity she experienced toward the end of her teenage years.

Guts is a sonically diverse record that blends pop and rock subgenres. The album uses a variety of guitar and drum sounds from alternative and pop rock styles to create energetic songs and soft ballads. The subject matter deals with Rodrigo's coming-of-age transition and its tribulations. The album received universal critical acclaim for its lyrical wit, complexity, topicality, aesthetic and energy. Reviews noted both humorous and emotionally fraught lyrics, detailing Rodrigo's struggles with identity, romantic and professional disillusionment, unexpected stardom, and societal expectations as a young woman.

Guts topped album charts in Argentina, Australia, Belgium, Canada, Germany, Ireland, the Netherlands, New Zealand, Norway, Portugal, Scotland, Spain, Sweden, the United Kingdom, and the United States. Within the lattermost, all 12 of its songs charted in the top 40 of the Billboard Hot 100. Three singles were released from the album, including the international number-one track "Vampire", the top-10 song "Bad Idea Right?", and "Get Him Back!". The album's deluxe edition, subtitled Spilled, was released on March 22, 2024, along with its lead single "Obsessed".

At the 66th Annual Grammy Awards, the album received nominations for Album of the Year and Best Pop Vocal Album, becoming her second consecutive Album of the Year nomination. Two of the album's tracks—"Vampire" and "Ballad of a Homeschooled Girl"—received four further Grammy nominations. In support of the album, Rodrigo embarked on the Guts World Tour (2024–2025), which grossed over $209 million from 101 shows. A concert film documenting the tour's Los Angeles shows was released in October 2024 on Netflix.

== Background ==
On May 21, 2021, Olivia Rodrigo released her debut studio album, Sour, to commercial success. Produced by Dan Nigro, it became Spotify's most-streamed album of the year and won Rodrigo three Grammy Awards, including Best New Artist. She embarked on the Sour Tour, which included 48 shows across North America and Europe, in spring 2022. In August 2021, she revealed that her upcoming record would "be a lot happier" than her debut.

Talking to Billboard in February 2022, Rodrigo confirmed she had a title and "a few songs" ready and that Nigro would return as producer. Rodrigo had aimed to "get as much done as possible" before embarking on the Sour Tour. In late 2022, while revealing her Spotify Wrapped, she confirmed that new music was underway. On January 8, 2023, she posted a clip on her Instagram that featured a piano-driven track.

In June 2023, Rodrigo's website was updated with a countdown set to end on June 30, a date she had also teased in May. On June 13, Rodrigo officially announced the album's lead single, "Vampire", slated for release on June 30, and revealed the single's cover. On June 20, she left her fans a voicemail greeting that included the first previews of "Vampire" and a piano-driven instrumental track. On June 26, 2023, her webstore revealed the official album title, Guts, and its release date. Soon afterward, Rodrigo officially announced the album and posted its artwork on social media.

== Writing and recording ==
According to Rodrigo, Guts is about "growing pains" and figuring out her identity at this point in her life: "I feel like I grew 10 years between the ages of 18 and 20". She described it as a natural part of her growth process and hoped to reflect that with the record.

Rodrigo recorded Guts while experiencing "lots of confusion, mistakes, awkwardness & good old fashioned teen angst". Described by her as a "time capsule", the record contains "wrenching, cinematic" ballads and "playful and insouciant" songs, according to Vogue. Rodrigo abstained from songwriting for six months following Sour's release, so that she could "live a life in order to be able to write about it". Work on the album concluded about a week before "Vampire" was released. In an interview with Zane Lowe for Apple Music, Rodrigo revealed that she had the title in mind since making Sour. It was influenced by the "interesting contexts" she noticed people use it in: "spill your guts, hate your guts".

== Composition ==
=== Music ===
Guts has been primarily described as a pop, rock, pop-punk, pop rock, alternative pop, and indie pop record with elements of alternative rock, indie rock, emo, new wave, shoegaze, and rap rock. Along with grunge, Jenkins also names power pop among the stylistic tactics. According to BBC journalist Nick Levine, the album contains "emotionally charged" pop rock songs that resonate with both Rodrigo's Generation Z peers and older generations. Guts also features a sonically diverse range of tracks, from soft ballads like "Lacy" to retro-inspired, guitar-driven tunes such as "Ballad of a Homeschooled Girl". Rodrigo's collaboration with Nigro played a significant role in the album's development, providing constructive feedback and contributing to its overall sound. According to The A.V. Club, Guts offers a mix of nostalgic and contemporary music elements, helping in the album's appeal with a wide audience.

"Ballad of a Homeschooled Girl"
The fifth track, "Ballad of a Homeschooled Girl", portrays Rodrigo dealing with social anxiety issues, over a heavy guitar grunge-inspired instrumentation.

"Pretty Isn't Pretty"
The eleventh track, "Pretty Isn't Pretty", is an indie pop track that incorporates shoegaze instrumentation and has lyrics expressing vulnerable emotions towards self-esteem and beauty standards.

Rock music features more prominently on Guts than on Sour, expanding on the aggressive and alternative rock sounds demonstrated briefly on Rodrigo's first album. As Los Angeles Times lead critic Mikael Wood writes, Rodrigo and Nigro are shown "switching up guitar tones and drum sounds to give each track a distinct signature". In particular, songs such as "All-American Bitch" and "Ballad of a Homeschooled Girl" are performed in pop-punk modes, while "Love Is Embarrassing", "Pretty Isn't Pretty", and "Lacy" incorporate new wave, indie pop, and dramatic folk sounds, respectively.

In another comparison to Sour, The A.V. Club identifies much older sources of inspiration behind Guts, particularly the grunge and pop-rock sounds of the 1990s and early 2000s. Line of Best Fit writer Matthew Kim notices "frequent musical inspiration" from the "pop punk and garage rock revival" of the turn of the 21st century, connecting this to Rodrigo's birth around this time and subsequent listening of her parents' alternative rock collection. uDiscoverMusic said Rodrigo uses "wiry" indie pop on the album.

=== Lyrics ===
Rodrigo's lyrics throughout Guts focus on her transition from adolescence to adulthood, exploring struggles with identity, sudden stardom, romance, and societal expectations for young women. According to Jenkins, the Joan Didion-referencing opener "All-American Bitch" introduces a world of "restrictive societal mores and beauty standards" that Rodrigo navigates throughout the album while in search of "meaningful companionship in a field of layabouts, liars, and social climbers".

Likening Guts conceptually to Billie Eilish's Happier Than Ever (2021), another record that explores the repercussions of fame, Wood observes how "Rodrigo intertwines her tales of social-professional disillusionment with stories of romantic betrayal". Rodrigo admires a rival as a "dazzling starlet" on "Lacy". Similarly, "The Grudge" details how Rodrigo's relationship with a person she looked up to soured; some critics, following fan speculation, have opined that the song could be about Taylor Swift or Gracie Abrams, while others said the song depicts Rodrigo's regret and inability to forgive after a romantic breakup. Jenkins recognizes a "brusque, confident" tone in the rockers, while lyrics about insecurity and maltreatment are revealed in "wounded ballads". Clash magazine's Alex Barry says Rodrigo's narratives are generally marked by complex, verbose lyrics delivered in a "fast talk-singing" style.

Meanwhile, BBC journalist Nick Levine observes "emotionally charged" pop-rock songs reflective of both Rodrigo's Generation Z peers and older generations. On songs such as "Get Him Back!" and "Bad Idea Right?", both satires of Gen Z dating behaviors, Rodrigo employs different tonal inflections and an expansion of the sense of humor "merely hinted at" on Sour, according to Wood: "You can hear her actor's background in pitch-perfect line readings that shift between comic registers on a dime — from naturalistic to screwball, faux-earnest to deadpan". "Ballad of a Homeschooled Girl" offers a candid portrayal of social awkwardness, drawing from Rodrigo's experience being homeschooled as a teenager. Scholar Theresa Helke commented how the track "Logical" was an example of how pop music can illustrate complex philosophical concepts like the paradox of material implication and the principle of explosion in classical logic.

== Release and promotion ==
Guts was released on September 8, 2023, via three box set editions, CD, cassette, download, and streaming services. Preorders for the album began on June 26, 2023. Vinyl LPs, in various colored variants, were also released, each of which were exclusively available at Rodrigo's webstore, Urban Outfitters, Walmart, Amazon, or HMV. A Target-exclusive CD and vinyl edition of Guts featuring an alternate cover was also available upon release. Each of a set of four bonus songs appeared as a 13th "hidden track" on each of the limited-edition vinyl variants sold on Rodrigo's webstore.

After teasing a deluxe edition in early 2024, Rodrigo announced Guts (Spilled) at the Chicago show of her Guts World Tour on March 19, 2024. The deluxe album contains five bonus tracks: the four vinyl-exclusive songs and a track Rodrigo recorded after the release of the standard album. It was released on March 22, 2024. An exclusive two-LP variant of the Spilled edition, comprising the standard and deluxe tracks as a double album, was released on November 29, 2024, for Record Store Day.

=== Cover artwork ===
The cover artwork for Guts was photographed by Larissa Hoffman. The image depicts Rodrigo reclining on a purple floor and biting her thumb, while wearing a frilly black dress, a blue-violet bra and scarlet lipstick, with four letter rings spelling out the album title on her fingers; her nails are painted with chipped black nail polish. The cover artwork of the Spilled edition is the same as the standard album, but the color of the bra changes to red and depicts a paper rip over Rodrigo's face. The deluxe album's title appears in black sans-serif font in the middle of the torn portion. As with her debut album, Sour, purple—this time in a darker shade—is again the dominant color of the artwork and promotional material for Guts.

=== Singles ===
The lead single of Guts, "Vampire", was released on June 30, 2023, via streaming platforms, 7-inch, and CD single formats; the latter two additionally feature a demo version of the song. An accompanying music video for the song, directed by Petra Collins in L.A., was uploaded to Rodrigo's YouTube channel simultaneously with the single's release. The song debuted atop the US Billboard Hot 100, marking her third number-one. It also topped the charts in Australia, Canada, Ireland, New Zealand, and the United Kingdom; where it also became her third leader.

"Bad Idea Right?" was announced as the second single though Rodrigo's social media accounts on August 8, 2023, and was released four days later. She stated that the song "shows another side of Guts that's a little more fun & playful". Collins directed the music video for this song as well. It reached the top 10 in Australia, the US, and UK. The song also landed atop the Billboard Hot Rock & Alternative Songs chart.

"Get Him Back!" impacted Italian radio as the third single on September 15, 2023. Its music video, directed by Jack Begert, was filmed on the iPhone 15 Pro Max and released on September 12, 2023. The song peaked within the top 10 on the Billboard Global 200, and in Australia, Ireland, New Zealand, and the UK.

"Obsessed" was released on March 22, 2024, as the lead single of the Spilled edition, and as the fourth single of the album, overall. Rodrigo debuted the song live, weeks before its release, as part of her setlist on tour. The music video for the song was nominated for Best Cinematography at the 2024 MTV Video Music Awards and Best International Pop Video at the 2024 UK Music Video Awards.

=== Marketing ===
The album's tracklist was teased via a video clip released on July 31, 2023, which included clues intended for fans to decode. It featured Rodrigo relaxing in a bedroom, unpacking boxes, and experimenting with various devices, including an electric keyboard and a retro typewriter. Rodrigo revealed the tracklist the day after. She released a trailer for the album on September 7, 2023, which parodied an infomercial and featured narration by Mort Crim. The video revealed the four "hidden tracks" of the album. A website dedicated to the album was also launched. A pop-up experience in partnership with American Express and Spotify, entitled the "Guts Gallery", ran from September 8 through September 10 in the Meatpacking District of Manhattan, New York City; it featured Guts-themed activations, photo ops, and exclusive merchandise. The pop-up privately commenced a day earlier for select American Express cardholders and Spotify fans, wherein Rodrigo appeared to preview four songs, and for the Q&A segment; it was moderated by fashion editor Eva Chen. Guts Gallery was also held in Jingūmae, Tokyo, from September 27 to October 1; in Queen Street West in Toronto, from March 29, 2024, to March 31, following the release of Guts (Spilled) on March 22; and in Shoreditch, London, from May 14 to 18. Another Guts pop-up, in collaboration with Complex Networks, ran from August 15 to 18.

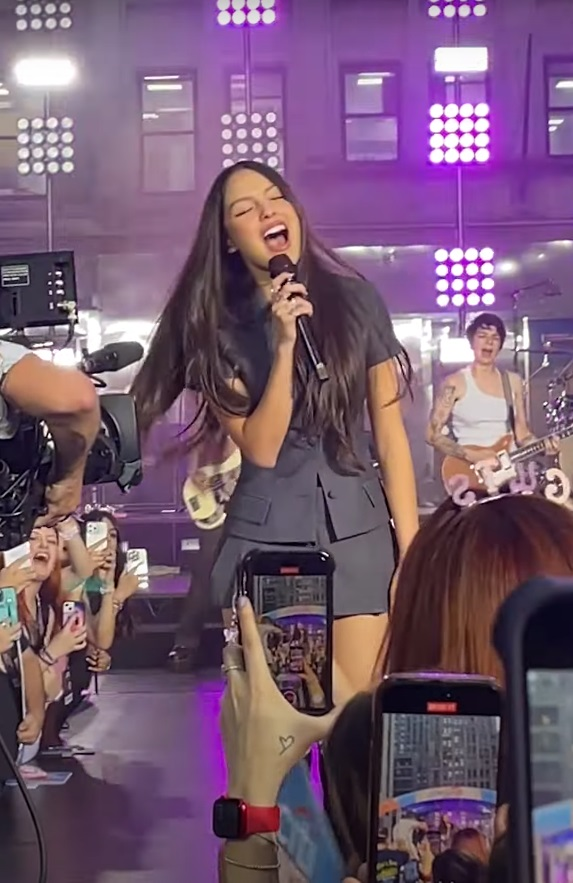
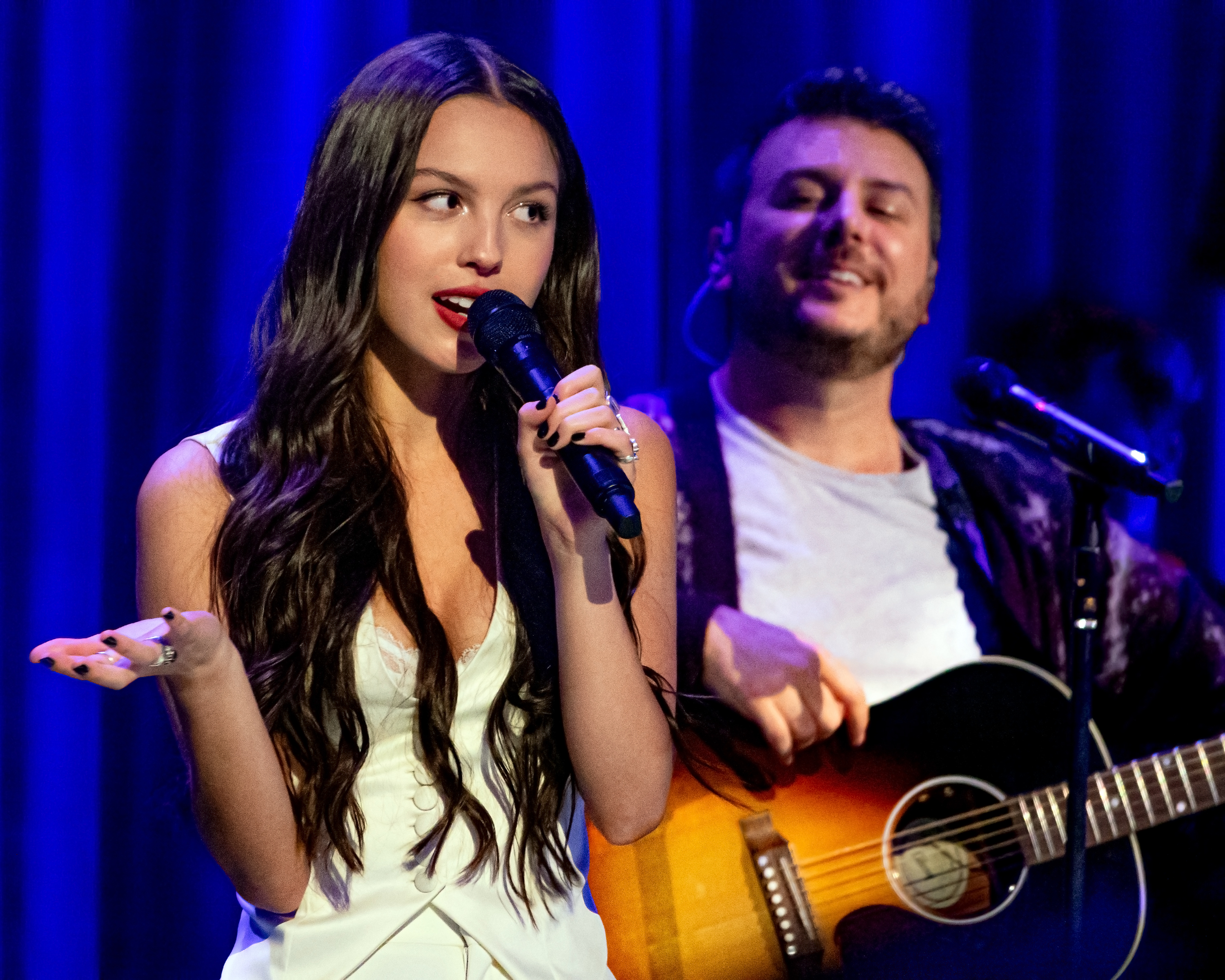
Rodrigo performing music from Guts on the Today show (left) in September 2023, and with Dan Nigro at the Ace Hotel (right) in October 2023.

To promote and discuss Guts, Rodrigo appeared on the magazine covers of Vogue, Rolling Stone, Interview, and The Face. She was interviewed by Zane Lowe on Apple Music 1, SiriusXM, The New Yorker, The New York Times, and Variety, about the album. She performed "Vampire" and "Get Him Back!" on Today and the Live Lounge, and at the 2023 MTV Video Music Awards. An intimate one-off concert, An Evening With Olivia Rodrigo, took place on October 9 at the Theatre at Ace Hotel to an audience of 1,600 people, wherein Rodrigo performed music from Guts, including acoustic renditions. She was joined by producer Dan Nigro for a Q&A and conversation segment in which they answered fan-submitted questions and discussed the album's creation. The concert was announced the day before, with tickets exclusively available to American Express cardholders. Proceeds from ticket sales benefited Rodrigo's nonprofit, Fund 4 Good, which supports organizations that "champion girls' education, support reproductive rights and prevent gender-based violence". The concert was filmed and uploaded to stream from October 10 through October 12 on Rodrigo's YouTube channel.

Rodrigo appeared as a guest on Jimmy Kimmel Live! on October 24, and performed "Ballad of a Homeschooled Girl" to conclude the show. She also appeared on The Tonight Show Starring Jimmy Fallon on December 7, followed by The Kelly Clarkson Show on December 11. She was the musical guest for Saturday Night Live on December 9, where she performed "Vampire" on the piano and "All American Bitch". The day after, she performed "Love Is Embarrassing", "Vampire", "Lacy", and "Making the Bed" on NPR's Tiny Desk video series. "Vampire" was again performed on the December 18 episode of The Late Show with Stephen Colbert.

Also in December, Rodrigo performed music from the album on the Los Angeles and New York City dates of iHeartRadio's Jingle Ball Tour 2023. Throughout the month, she released the official Vevo live performances for all of the album's tracks.

=== Tour ===
On September 13, 2023, Rodrigo announced her second concert tour, the Guts World Tour, in support of the album. Consisting of 102 international dates across five continents and multiple music festivals with Rodrigo as a headliner, the tour started on February 23, 2024, in Thousand Palms, United States, and concluded on July 1, 2025, in Manchester, England. Supporting acts include The Breeders, Chappell Roan, PinkPantheress, Remi Wolf, Benee, Beabadoobee, and St. Vincent. Before its announcement, the tour and its first show were teased in an Easter egg in the lyric video for the track "Making the Bed". Rodrigo stated she wrote Guts "with a tour in mind [...] they're all songs I wanted people to be able to scream in a crowd"; and that with the tour, she "set out to [create her] own version of a rock show". A portion of the proceeds from ticket sales will go to Rodrigo's Fund 4 Good initiative.

The Guts World Tour grossed over $209.1 million with over 1.6 million tickets sold, based on 101 shows, marking the highest-grossing tour by an artist born in the 21st century. Additionally, Rodrigo became the youngest female solo act to gross over $200 million in her first arena tour. The tour received positive reviews from critics. Rodrigo was awarded Touring Artist of the Year at the 2024 Billboard Live Music Awards; the tour was nominated for Major Tour and Pop Tour of the Year at the upcoming 2025 Pollstar Awards. A concert film based on the tour, titled Olivia Rodrigo: Guts World Tour, was filmed on August 20 and 21, 2024, at Intuit Dome. It was released on October 29, 2024, on Netflix. Variety stated that the film "further cements just how assured the show was as a captivating blast of guitar-driven energy".

=== Guts: The Secret Tracks ===
On October 18, 2023, Rodrigo announced that the four secret tracks — "Obsessed", "Girl I've Always Been", "Scared of My Guitar", and "Stranger" — released on limited vinyl editions of the album would be released as a limited vinyl-exclusive EP on November 24, 2023, via Third Man Records, to commemorate Record Store Day (RSD) Black Friday.

The EP ranked as one of the top sellers during Record Store Day, securing the position of the second best-selling album of Record Store Day 2023. Additionally, it debuted at number 200 on the Billboard 200 chart. Its four songs were later released as part of the deluxe Spilled edition.

== Critical reception ==
Professional ratings
Aggregate scores
Source	Rating
AnyDecentMusic?	8.4/10
Metacritic	91/100
Review scores
Source	Rating
AllMusic	4.5/5 stars
And It Don't Stop	A
The Daily Telegraph	3/5 stars
Financial Times	4/5 stars
The Guardian	4/5 stars
The Independent	5/5 stars
NME	5/5 stars
Pitchfork	8.0/10
Rolling Stone	5/5 stars
The Times	4/5 stars

Guts was met with universal critical acclaim. At Metacritic, which assigns a normalized score out of 100 to ratings from professional publications, it received a weighted mean score of 91, based on 22 reviews. Rob Sheffield of Rolling Stone hailed the album as an "instant classic" and the work of "a truly brilliant rock star", with some of Rodrigo's "most ambitious, intimate, and messy songs yet", proving she is "a voice that's here to stay and a songwriter built to last." Offering similar praise, Billboard magazine's Jason Lipshutz called it "the most complete pop album of the year". Its musical aesthetic was hailed by music critic Robert Christgau as a "triumph", while The New York Times reviewer Jon Caramanica deemed it "poignantly fraught" and "agitated" with an energy that matches the spirit of Rodrigo's narratives. The New Yorker's Carrie Battan found its alternative-leaning cross-section of revivalist pop-punk and piano ballads shrewd, thoughtfully constructed, and fitting with the rebellious cheek and yearning melodrama reflected in the music's tone. Academic Kelly Marie Coyne referred to Guts as "a pleasure and a provocation", arguing that "pop culture, today, is ready to meet Rodrigo on her terms and take seriously what she has to say".

Several reviewers noted the wit to the lyrics. The Guardian's Alexis Petridis found the record "sharp and witty", and Ludovic Hunter-Tilney of Financial Times called it "quick-witted post-Taylor-Swift pop" with "emo-adjacent pop-punk and bombast-free ballads". In her review for The Independent, Helen Brown deemed it "wittier" and "angrier" than Sour. Conversely, Poppie Platt of The Daily Telegraph wrote a mixed review, which said Guts was mostly a mere continuation of her first album with little musical or lyrical growth. Charles Lyon-Burt of Slant Magazine considered some songs on Guts as "missteps" but called the album a consistent record overall.

Other reviewers were impressed by the complexity and credibility of Rodrigo's performance. Calling the album a "masterpiece", Mikael Wood found the lyrics emotionally convincing and connected it to Swift's overall influence on Rodrigo: "This talent for embodying various sides of her character feels like a defining attribute of Guts". Christgau noted the "psychological complexity", persuasive characterization, and amusing humor in her portraying the tribulations of a young popstar, concluding that "she's so damn good at what she does". Concluding her review for AllMusic, Heather Phares proclaimed Guts to be a testament to Rodrigo's artistic confidence, eloquence, and ability to translate complex emotions into music with broad appeal.

=== Year-end lists ===
Numerous critics and publications listed Guts in their year-end ranking of the best albums of 2023, often inside the top-ten. BBC defined the album as the most critically acclaimed of 2023.

Select year-end rankings for Guts
Publication/critic	List	Rank	Ref.
Billboard	The 50 Best Albums of 2023: Staff List	1	
Consequence	The 50 Best Albums of 2023	28	
Entertainment Weekly	The 10 Best Albums of 2023	4	
Los Angeles Times	The 20 Best Albums of 2023	5	
The New York Times	Jon Caramanica's Best Albums of 2023	11	
The New York Times	Jon Pareles' Best Albums of 2023	5	
The New York Times	Lindsay Zoladz's Best Albums of 2023	3	
The Sunday Times	The 20 Best Albums of 2023	8	
NME	The Best Albums of 2023	2	
People	Top 10 Albums of 2023	1	
Pitchfork	The 50 Best Albums of 2023	14	
Rolling Stone	The 100 Best Albums of 2023	5	
Variety	The Best Albums of 2023	4	
Vogue	The Best Albums of 2023	N/A	

== Commercial performance ==
=== United States ===
In the United States, Guts debuted at number one on Billboard 200 chart, earning 302,000 album-equivalent units (including 150,000 in pure album sales) in its first week, approximately 7,000 more units than her debut. It became Rodrigo's second album to top the chart. The album also accumulated a total of 199.59 million on-demand streams of the album's songs, with all 12 tracks charting in the top 40 of the Hot 100, including a return to the number-one spot for "Vampire". Of those 150,000 pure sales, 94,000 came from vinyl records, registering the seventh largest week of vinyl sales in history since Luminate began electronically tracking sales in 1991. The twelve constituent songs of the album appeared simultaneously in the Top 40 of the Billboard Hot 100, and along with the eleven tracks from Sour that were also placed within the first forty positions, they credited Rodrigo with being the first artist in history to accomplish this feat with only two albums released. Following the release of the deluxe version, Guts ascended to the second spot of the Billboard 200 on the chart dated April 6, 2024, moving 73,000 units in its twenty-ninth week.

All tracks on the deluxe version also made their debut on the Billboard Hot 100. As of April 2, 2026, Guts has been certified triple platinum by the RIAA for over 3 million sales units in the United States.

=== Worldwide ===
In the United Kingdom, the album landed at the top on the UK Albums Chart with 60,300 units, scoring Rodrigo's second number-one album in the country and surpassing Sour's first week sales with roughly 10,000 more units. It also had the fourth highest entry on the chart in 2023, outselling the entirety of the top 10 combined.

In Australia, the album debuted at number one on the ARIA Albums Chart, her second number one in the country, while all the tracks debuted on the ARIA Singles Chart. "Vampire" (which had already debuted at number one on the singles chart in July) and "Bad Idea Right?" rose to the Top 3. Guts entered at the number one spot of the New Zealand Albums Chart, becoming her second consecutive number-one album.

== Awards and rankings ==
Numerous critics and publications listed Guts in their year-end ranking of the best albums of 2023, often inside the top-ten. BBC defined the album as the most critically acclaimed of 2023. People magazine and the staff writers of Billboard considered it as the best album of 2023 ranking it at number one in their respective year-end lists. It was also included in the top five of the year-end lists by NME (2nd), Entertainment Weekly (4th), Variety (4th), Los Angeles Times (5th), and Rolling Stone.(5th) The New York Times' Jon Caramanica, Jon Pareles and Lindsay Zoladz included the album in their year-end lists, ranking it at number eleven, five and three respectively. It was also included in the year-end lists of publications like The Sunday Times (8th), Consequence (28th), and Pitchfork (14th). Guts was also included in an unranked year-end list by Vogue.

At the 2024 Grammy Awards, Guts and its songs were nominated for 6 categories with the album itself being nominated for Album of the Year and Best Pop Vocal Album. It was nominated for Best International Album at the Los 40 Music Awards (2023), with Rodrigo being nominated for Best International Artist at the 2024 ARIA Music Awards. It won the Album of the Year at the 2024 People's Choice Awards, Pop Album of the Year at the 2024 iHeartRadio Music Awards, and Favourite Album at the 2024 Nickelodeon Kids' Choice Awards. It additionally won three awards at the 2024 Webby Awards. (Note: It won: Social Arts, Culture & Lifestyle (Campaigns) (Webby Winner); Social Arts, Culture & Lifestyle (Campaigns) (People's Voice Winner); Social Celebrity/Fan (Webby Winner)) It also won the "Western Music Award" at the 2024 CD Shop Awards.

== Track listing ==
All tracks are produced by Dan Nigro, except where noted.

Standard edition
No.	Title	Writer(s)	Producer(s)	Length
1.	"All-American Bitch"	Olivia Rodrigo; Daniel Nigro		2:45
2.	"Bad Idea Right?"	Rodrigo; Nigro		3:04
3.	"Vampire"	Rodrigo; Nigro		3:39
4.	"Lacy"	Rodrigo; Nigro		2:57
5.	"Ballad of a Homeschooled Girl"	Rodrigo; Nigro		3:23
6.	"Making the Bed"	Rodrigo; Nigro		3:18
7.	"Logical"	Rodrigo; Nigro; Julia Michaels	Nigro; Ryan Linvill^{[a]}	3:51
8.	"Get Him Back!"	Rodrigo; Nigro	Nigro; Alexander 23^{[b]}; Ian Kirkpatrick^{[b]}	3:31
9.	"Love Is Embarrassing"	Rodrigo; Nigro		2:34
10.	"The Grudge"	Rodrigo; Nigro	Nigro; Linvill^{[a]}	3:09
11.	"Pretty Isn't Pretty"	Rodrigo; Nigro; Amy Allen		3:19
12.	"Teenage Dream"	Rodrigo; Nigro		3:42
Total length:				39:12

Spilled edition
No.	Title	Writer(s)	Length
13.	"Obsessed"	Rodrigo; Annie Clark; Nigro	2:50
14.	"Girl I've Always Been"	Rodrigo	2:01
15.	"Scared of My Guitar"	Rodrigo; Nigro; Allen	4:23
16.	"Stranger"	Rodrigo	3:12
17.	"So American"	Rodrigo; Nigro	2:49
Total length:			54:27

=== Notes ===
- ^{^[a]} indicates an additional producer
- ^{^[b]} indicates a co-producer
- All tracks are stylized in all lowercase.
- Physical vinyl editions include either "Obsessed", "Scared of My Guitar", "Stranger" or "Girl I've Always Been" as a bonus track. These four songs are also included on the Record Store Day limited vinyl edition.
- Apple Music edition includes the music videos of the three original singles.

== Personnel ==
Credits adapted from the liner notes of Guts.

- Olivia Rodrigo – lead vocals, backing vocals
- Daniel Nigro – engineer, vocal producer, backing vocals (all tracks); acoustic guitar (tracks 1, 4, 5, 7–12), electric guitar (1–6, 8–12), bass (1–4, 6, 8–10, 12), percussion (1–3, 5, 8, 10–12), drum programming (1–3, 5, 6, 8, 9, 11), synthesizers (1, 4, 6–12), piano (3, 6–8, 10, 12), Mellotron (3, 10–12); Juno-60, Moog (3); Nashville guitars, drums (4); mixer (8)
- Dave Schiffman – engineer (1, 5, 9)
- Jasmine Chen – engineer (1, 5)
- Sterling Laws – engineer (1, 2, 5, 12), drums (1–3, 5, 8, 11, 12)
- Sam Stewart – engineer (1, 2, 5, 12), acoustic guitar (1), electric guitar (1–3, 5, 9, 12)
- Austen Healey – assistant engineer (1–4, 6, 7, 10–12)
- Ryan Linvill – bass (1, 5, 7, 10, 11); engineer, saxophone (6, 7, 10); acoustic guitar, Moog, synthesizers (7, 10); backing vocals (7)
- Mark "Spike" Stent – mixer (1, 2, 5, 9, 11)
- Matt Wolach – assistant mix engineer (1, 2, 5, 9, 11)
- Dan Viafore – engineer (2, 3, 11, 12)
- Michael Harris – engineer (3)
- Chris Kasych – engineer (3, 4, 7)
- Benjamin Romans – piano (3, 7)
- Paul Cartwright – violin, viola (3, 12)
- Serban Ghenea – mixer (3, 6, 7)
- Bryce Bordone – assistant mix engineer (3, 6, 7)
- Dani Perez – engineer (4, 6)
- Chappell Roan – backing vocals (2, 4, 13), ad-libs (8)
- Mitch McCarthy – mixer (4, 10, 12)
- Erick Serna – electric guitar (5)
- Alexander 23 – engineer, slide guitar, drums, synthesizers, bass, backing vocals (8)
- Ian Kirkpatrick – engineer, synthesizers, drum programming (8)
- Garrett Ray – drums (9)
- Derek Stein – cello (12)
- Randy Merrill – masterer

Packaging

- Larissa Hofmann – photography
- Christopher Simmonds – creative direction
- Daisy Chalfant – art direction
- Greg Jackson – art direction
- Danielle Goldberg – wardrobe
- Clayton Hawkins – hair
- Melissa Hernandez – makeup
- Thuy Nguyen – nails

== Charts ==
=== Weekly charts ===
Weekly chart performance
Chart (2023–2024)	Peak position
Argentine Albums (CAPIF)	1
Australian Albums (ARIA)	1
Austrian Albums (Ö3 Austria)	2
Belgian Albums (Ultratop Flanders)	1
Belgian Albums (Ultratop Wallonia)	4
Canadian Albums (Billboard)	1
Croatian International Albums (HDU)	3
Czech Albums (ČNS IFPI)	2
Danish Albums (Hitlisten)	3
Dutch Albums (Album Top 100)	1
Finnish Albums (Suomen virallinen lista)	3
French Albums (SNEP)	5
German Albums (Offizielle Top 100)	1
Greek Albums (IFPI)	9
Hungarian Albums (MAHASZ)	6
Icelandic Albums (Tónlistinn)	2
Irish Albums (Official Charts)	1
Italian Albums (FIMI)	3
Japanese Albums (Oricon)	29
Japanese Combined Albums (Oricon)	30
Japanese Hot Albums (Billboard Japan)	31
Lithuanian Albums (AGATA)	2
New Zealand Albums (RMNZ)	1
Norwegian Albums (VG-lista)	1
Polish Albums (ZPAV)	2
Portuguese Albums (AFP)	1
Scottish Albums (Official Charts)	1
Slovak Albums (ČNS IFPI)	3
Spanish Albums (Promusicae)	1
Swedish Albums (Sverigetopplistan)	1
Swiss Albums (Schweizer Hitparade)	2
UK Albums (Official Charts)	1
US Billboard 200	1
US Top Rock & Alternative Albums (Billboard)	1

Weekly chart performance ==== Guts: The Secret Tracks ====
Chart (2023)	Peak position
UK Physical Singles (OC)	2
UK Singles Sales (OC)	3
US Billboard 200	200

Weekly chart performance ==== Guts (Spilled) ====
Chart (2024)	Peak position
Icelandic Albums (Tónlistinn)	36
New Zealand Albums (RMNZ)	3
Norwegian Albums (VG-lista)	10

=== Year-end charts ===
Year-end chart performance
Chart (2023)	Position
Australian Albums (ARIA)	18
Austrian Albums (Ö3 Austria)	39
Belgian Albums (Ultratop Flanders)	26
Belgian Albums (Ultratop Wallonia)	104
Dutch Albums (Album Top 100)	24
French Albums (SNEP)	144
German Albums (Offizielle Top 100)	57
Hungarian Albums (MAHASZ)	42
Icelandic Albums (Tónlistinn)	83
New Zealand Albums (RMNZ)	22
Polish Albums (ZPAV)	78
Portuguese Albums (AFP)	12
Spanish Albums (PROMUSICAE)	27
Swiss Albums (Schweizer Hitparade)	74
UK Albums (OCC)	15
US Billboard 200	52
US Top Rock & Alternative Albums (Billboard)	11

Year-end chart performance
Chart (2024)	Position
Australian Albums (ARIA)	9
Austrian Albums (Ö3 Austria)	15
Belgian Albums (Ultratop Flanders)	6
Belgian Albums (Ultratop Wallonia)	63
Canadian Albums (Billboard)	15
Danish Albums (Hitlisten)	67
Dutch Albums (Album Top 100)	10
French Albums (SNEP)	95
German Albums (Offizielle Top 100)	44
Hungarian Albums (MAHASZ)	58
Icelandic Albums (Tónlistinn)	81
New Zealand Albums (RMNZ)	10
Polish Albums (ZPAV)	62
Portuguese Albums (AFP)	14
Spanish Albums (PROMUSICAE)	26
Swedish Albums (Sverigetopplistan)	88
Swiss Albums (Schweizer Hitparade)	66
UK Albums (OCC)	10
US Billboard 200	12
US Top Rock & Alternative Albums (Billboard)	4

Year-end chart performance
Chart (2025)	Position
Australian Albums (ARIA)	42
Belgian Albums (Ultratop Flanders)	18
Belgian Albums (Ultratop Wallonia)	127
Dutch Albums (Album Top 100)	40
French Albums (SNEP)	165
Spanish Albums (PROMUSICAE)	76
UK Albums (OCC)	27
US Billboard 200	54
US Top Rock & Alternative Albums (Billboard)	10

== Certifications and sales ==
Certifications and sales
Region	Certification	Certified units/sales
Australia (ARIA)	2× Platinum	140,000^{‡}
Austria (IFPI Austria)	Platinum	15,000^{‡}
Brazil (Pro-Música Brasil)	Platinum	40,000^{‡}
Brazil (Pro-Música Brasil) Spilled edition	Platinum	40,000^{‡}
Canada (Music Canada)	4× Platinum	320,000^{‡}
Denmark (IFPI Danmark)	Platinum	20,000^{‡}
France (SNEP)	Platinum	100,000^{‡}
Germany (BVMI)	Gold	75,000^{‡}
Italy (FIMI)	Platinum	50,000^{‡}
Mexico (AMPROFON)	Gold	70,000^{‡}
New Zealand (RMNZ)	3× Platinum	45,000^{‡}
Poland (ZPAV)	Platinum	20,000^{‡}
Portugal (AFP)	Platinum	7,000^{‡}
Spain (Promusicae)	Platinum	40,000^{‡}
United Kingdom (BPI)	2× Platinum	788,013 (Note: British total sales for Guts in June 2026.)
United States (RIAA)	3× Platinum	3,000,000^{‡}
^{‡} Sales+streaming figures based on certification alone.

== Release history ==
Release dates and formats
Region	Date	Format(s)	Edition	Label	Ref.
Various	September 8, 2023	Box set; cassette; CD; digital download; streaming; vinyl LP	Standard	Geffen	
United States	September 8, 2023	CD; vinyl LP	Target exclusive	Geffen	
United Kingdom	September 8, 2023	Cassette	UK exclusive	Polydor	
Japan	September 8, 2023	CD	Japan Deluxe	Interscope; Universal Japan	
Brazil	December 8, 2023	Vinyl LP (Black + Card Insert)	Standard	Universal Brasil	
United States	January 11, 2024	Picture disc	Standard	Geffen	
Various	March 22, 2024	Digital download; streaming	Spilled Deluxe	Geffen	
Australia	July 18, 2024	Vinyl LP	Spilled Deluxe	Geffen; Interscope	
Various	July 19, 2024	Vinyl LP	Spilled Deluxe	Geffen; Interscope	
Japan	August 21, 2024	CD	Spilled Deluxe	Interscope; Universal Japan	

== See also ==
- List of 2023 albums
- List of Billboard 200 number-one albums of 2023
- List of number-one albums from the 2020s (New Zealand)
- List of number-one albums of 2023 (Australia)
- List of number-one albums of 2023 (Canada)
- List of number-one albums of 2023 (Ireland)
- List of number-one albums of 2023 (Norway)
- List of number-one albums of 2023 (Portugal)
- List of number-one albums of 2023 (Scotland)
- List of number-one albums of 2023 (Spain)
- List of UK Albums Chart number ones of the 2020s
