= Lacy (song) =

2023 song by Olivia Rodrigo

Song by Olivia Rodrigo

from the album Guts
- Released: September 8, 2023
- Studio: Amusement (Los Angeles); Electric Lady (New York City)
- Genre: Folk-pop; indie folk
- Length: 2:57
- Label: Geffen
- Songwriters: Olivia Rodrigo; Dan Nigro
- Producer: Dan Nigro

Lyric video
- "Lacy" on YouTube

"Lacy" (stylized in all lowercase) is a song by American singer-songwriter Olivia Rodrigo from her second studio album, Guts (2023). Rodrigo wrote the track with its producer, Dan Nigro. It became available when the album was released by Geffen Records. A folk-pop and indie folk song, "Lacy" originated from a poem that Rodrigo wrote for a class assignment. The song chronicles Rodrigo's obsession with the beauty of a female figure named Lacy, as well as her own envy and self-hatred.

Music critics commented on the lyricism and production of "Lacy" as well as the intensity of Rodrigo's performance. Some perceived potential LGBTQ implications in the song's lyrics. "Lacy" charted within the top 30 in Australia, Canada, Ireland, New Zealand, and the United States. The song received platinum certifications in Australia, Canada, and New Zealand.

Rodrigo has performed "Lacy" at the Grammy Museum, the Bluebird Café, and a Tiny Desk concert. She included it on the set list of her 2024–2025 concert tour, the Guts World Tour. American singer-songwriter Noah Kahan covered the song on BBC Radio 1's Live Lounge, which was released as the B-side to a 7-inch vinyl single in April 2024.

== Background and promotion ==
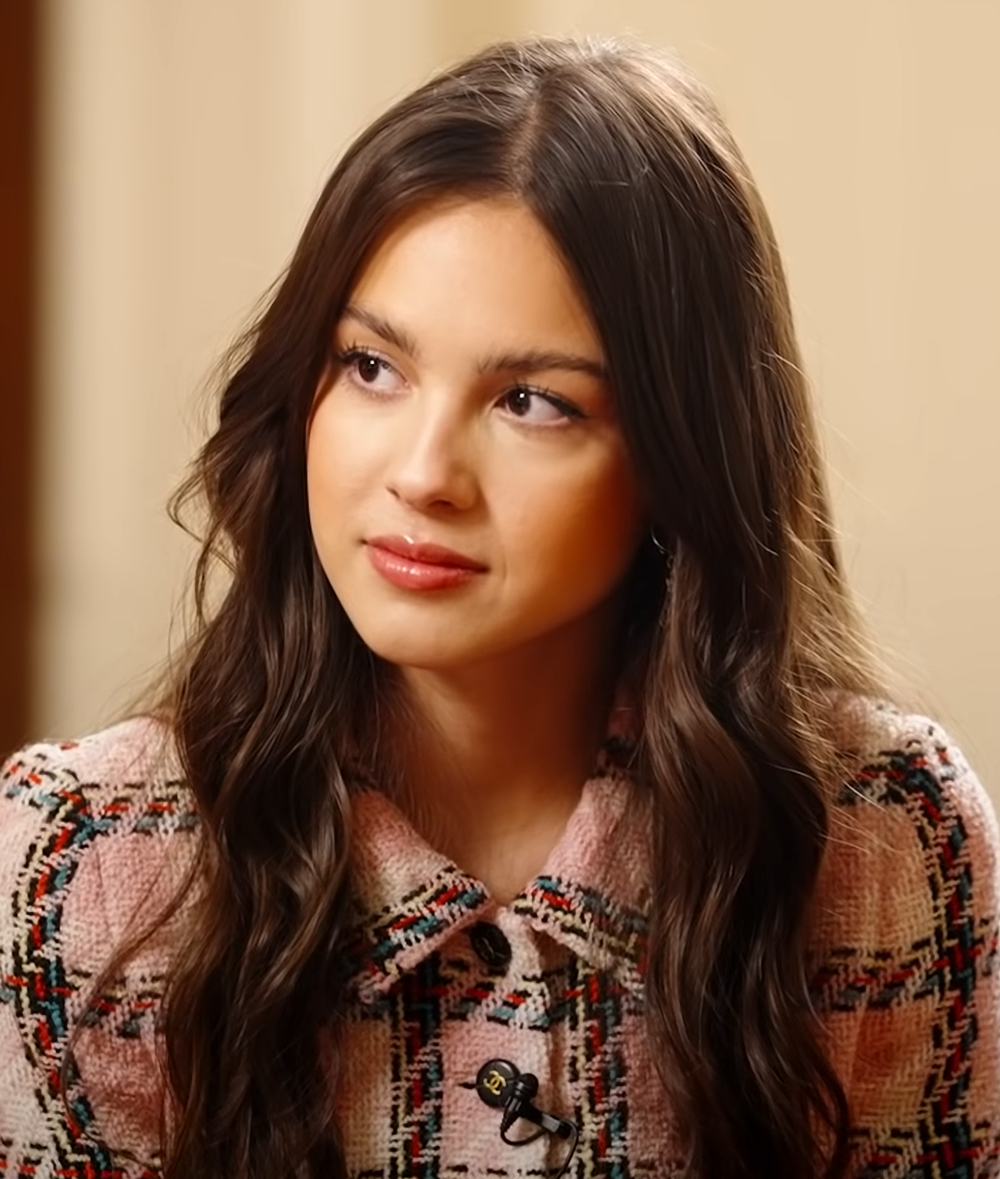
Olivia Rodrigo (pictured in 2021) first started writing "Lacy" as a poem for a homework assignment.

Olivia Rodrigo's debut studio album, Sour, was released in May 2021. Following the album's release, she took a break from songwriting for six months. Rodrigo conceived the follow-up album, Guts (2023), while experiencing "lots of confusion, mistakes, awkwardness & good old fashioned teen angst". Dan Nigro, who produced Sour, returned as the producer.

While attending poetry classes at USC, the University of Southern California, in 2022, Rodrigo conceived "Lacy" as a poem for a homework assignment. She came up with the titular line while sitting at her kitchen counter: "Lacy, oh Lacy, skin like puff pastry." Rodrigo described the inspiration as "this sort of all-encompassing envy that [she] was feeling". She liked the poem and transformed it into a song with Nigro. "Lacy" was the first song Rodrigo conceived by starting with a fully formed lyric before creating the melody, a process she described as an amusing test for herself as an artist. Rodrigo called the final result one of her favorite songs on Guts.

On August 1, 2023, Rodrigo revealed the track list of Guts, which features "Lacy" as the fourth track. The song became available for digital download on the album, which was released on September 8. Following the release, it received attention from fans due to the mysterious character of its subject matter, with some suggesting the song might be about Taylor Swift, Gracie Abrams, or Sabrina Carpenter. When asked about the inspiration, Rodrigo responded: "All my songs are about me and about how I feel, I don't know!"

On September 29, 2023, Rodrigo performed "Lacy" for the first time at the Bluebird Café. She sang an acoustic version of the song at the Grammy Museum on October 3. Rodrigo reprised it at the Ace Hotel Los Angeles five days later, in a concert exclusively for American Express cardholders. During a Tiny Desk concert for NPR Music in December, she performed "Lacy" on a lavender acoustic guitar with a choir. The song was included on the set list of Rodrigo's 2024–2025 concert tour, the Guts World Tour. She sang it while wriggling on an upraised platform before several dancers emerged from under it to perform choreography; Vancouver Sun's Stuart Derdeyn likened the choreography to Busby Berkeley's water ballet sequences during the Golden Age of Hollywood. Bows were prominently featured in the routine. That performance was included in the tour's associated concert film, Olivia Rodrigo: Guts World Tour (2024). In 2025, Rodrigo reprised the song during a string of festivals including Lollapalooza (Chile, Argentina, Brazil, France, and the US), Estéreo Picnic, Pa'l Norte, I-Days, and Osheaga. She performed it at the Park Avenue Armory during a concert hosted by American Express in October 2025, and in 2026 at a private concert at the Echo and for Spotify Billions Club at Teatre Grec.

== Composition ==
"Lacy"
"Lacy" is an acoustic ballad with a folk-pop and indie folk sound and influences of theatrical folk. Rodrigo's whispered vocals are layered on it.

"Lacy" is 2 minutes and 57 seconds long. It was recorded at Amusement Studios in Los Angeles and Electric Lady Studios in New York City. Nigro provided production and vocal production, and he engineered the song with Dani Perez and Chris Kasych. He played drums, acoustic guitar, electric guitar, bass, and synthesizer. To add different tones, Chappell Roan provided background vocals upon Nigro's request. Mitch McCarthy mixed the song at the Wheelhouse Studios in Vancouver, and Randy Merrill handled mastering at Sterling Sound in Edgewater, New Jersey.

"Lacy" is an acoustic ballad featuring the same folk-pop sound as other songs on Sour, with influences of theatrical folk. The song's instrumentation is driven by a fingerpicked acoustic guitar. Rodrigo initially sings in a sarcastic tone and later delivers her vocals with a whisper which Billboard's Jason Lipshutz described as contemptuous. Mikael Wood of the Los Angeles Times believed "Lacy" has an indie folk sound reminiscent of the work of Gracie Abrams. Its layered vocal harmonies, which recall the work of Lana Del Rey according to Beats per Minute's Lucas Martins, lead into an electronic/synthesizer flourish.

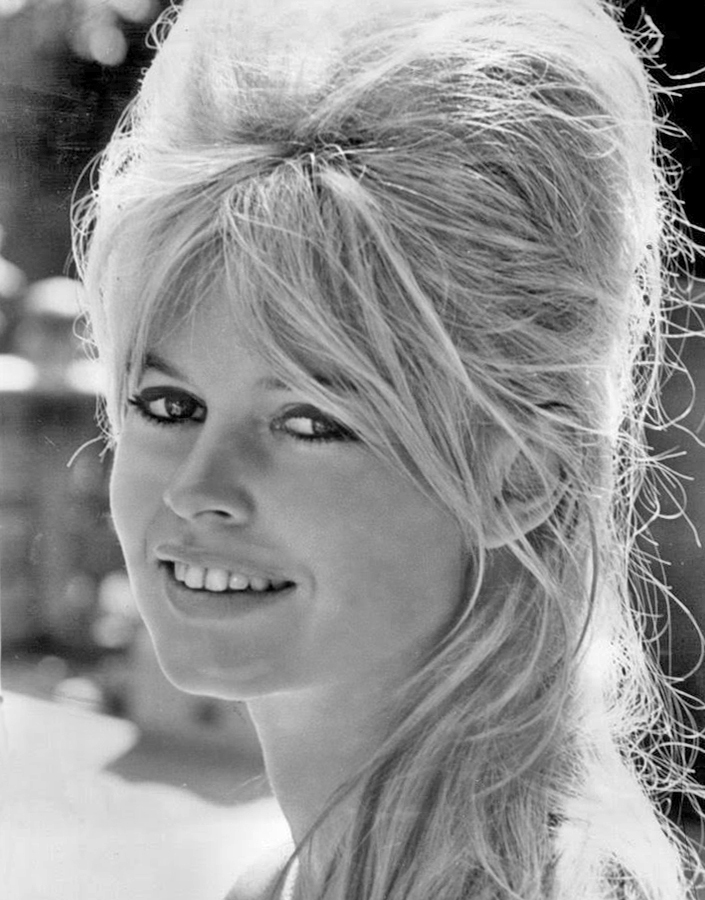
Lacy is described as a reincarnation of French actress Brigitte Bardot (pictured in 1962) in the song's lyrics.

The lyrics of "Lacy" depict Rodrigo's jealousy towards a female figure called Lacy. Rodrigo describes her through comparisons as someone who possesses "skin like puff pastry" and "eyes white as daisies". She continues complimenting Lacy during the second verse, calling her "sexy" and referring to her as a reincarnation of French actress Brigitte Bardot. Rodrigo details being tortured by her obsession and constant thoughts about her. Each recurrence of the song's hook features different lyrics, and Rodrigo describes Lacy as "made of angel dust". Rodrigo's obsession grows into resentment, and she confesses to experiencing self-hatred due to her envy towards its climax: "I just loathe you lately / And I despise my jealous eyes and how hard they fell for you / Yeah, I despise my rotten mind and how much it worships you." Critics compared the song's lyrical theme to Dolly Parton's 1973 single "Jolene" and the track "Jealousy, Jealousy" from Sour. Rob Sheffield of Rolling Stone described it as "a mournful lament about falling under the spell of a femme fantasy ideal".

Based on the physical description of Lacy, such as the Bardot comparison, Time's Moises Mendez II likened her to Swift and Stephanie Soteriou of BuzzFeed News compared her to Carpenter. Critics like Out's Bernardo Sim and Pride's Rachel Kiley wrote about the plausible LGBTQ implications of the lyrics. Mendez believed they had a "homoerotic tinge", and Sheffield opined they could be about an imaginary persona or a real-world attraction. Reviewers thought they simultaneously describe adulation, envy, and resentment, muddling the difference between jealousy and a sapphic infatuation. Responding to this, Rodrigo stated that she appreciated the more imaginative interpretations of who Lacy is, such as a former version of herself or the inner voice that tells her she is not good enough.

== Critical reception ==
AllMusic's Heather Phares thought "Lacy" delves into the complexities of envy and longing with a subtlety that would be impressive from songwriters of any age, and Lipshutz believed the chorus's mutating lyrics displayed a "songwriting triumph". Writing for MusicOMH, John Murphy favorably compared it to Lorde's studio album Melodrama (2017). Variety's Chris Willman described "Lacy" as Swift's 2015 single "Bad Blood" if it was transformed into a slower beautiful ballad with a more ambivalent and self-reflective tone rather than pure anger. Wood believed the song was among the most majestic ones on Guts, and Willman remarked that "Rodrigo makes poetry out of insecurity like nobody's business" while praising the chorus and melody. On the other hand, Poppie Platt of The Daily Telegraph thought it was "downright bad" and criticized the lyric comparing Lacy's skin to puff pastry: "Since when was the best way to describe a beautiful face as possessing the sheen of a sausage roll"? Nylon included the same line in its list of Guts's "impeccable" lyrics, and GQ included "Lacy, oh, Lacy, I just loathe you lately" in its list of the album's standout and "gutsiest" lyrics.

Some critics commented on the intensity of Rodrigo's performance and the production of "Lacy". The Independent's Helen Brown believed she sang with vigor, similarly to Tori Amos, and Wood thought her "breath [sounded] almost uncomfortably hot on the microphone". Sowing of Sputnikmusic found the vocal layering beautiful and opined that Rodrigo sounded divine on the song. Its production was described as airy, delicate, and dreamy; The New York Times's Jon Caramanica drew comparisons with Swift's 2020 album Folklore. Matthew Kim of The Line of Best Fit thought the strummed guitars and ascending vocals created an intimacy that surpassed all of her previous work. Writing for The Wall Street Journal, Mark Richardson believed the harmony was refined and attractive and that the music was engaging enough to counter some of its awkward lyrics.

Sheffield ranked "Lacy" as the 16th-best of 23 Rodrigo songs in September 2023, describing it as one of the most puzzling and mysterious tracks on Guts. He picked his favorite lyric: "I despise my rotten mind, and how much it worships you." The song descended three spots to number 19 upon the list's expansion to 52 songs in 2026. Willman and Steven J. Horowitz placed it at number six on Variety's list of the best songs of 2023. Mel Wang of Rolling Stone Philippines ranked the song as the 19th-best of 31 songs in Rodrigo's discography in June 2026.

== Commercial performance ==
"Lacy" debuted at number 23 on the US Billboard Hot 100 issued for September 23, 2023. In Canada, the song entered at number 24 on the Canadian Hot 100 chart for the same date and was certified double platinum by Music Canada. In the United Kingdom, it debuted at number 26 on the Official Audio Streaming Chart and number 24 on Billboard. "Lacy" received a gold certification in the United Kingdom from the British Phonographic Industry, and the Official Charts declared it her 19th-biggest song in the country as of February 2024.

In Australia, "Lacy" entered at number 25 and received a platinum certification from the Australian Recording Industry Association. The song debuted at number 16 in New Zealand and was certified platinum by Recorded Music NZ. It also charted at number 20 on the Billboard Global 200. "Lacy" reached national record charts at number 18 in Ireland, number 52 in Portugal, and number 65 in Greece. The song received a gold certification in Brazil.

== Noah Kahan cover ==
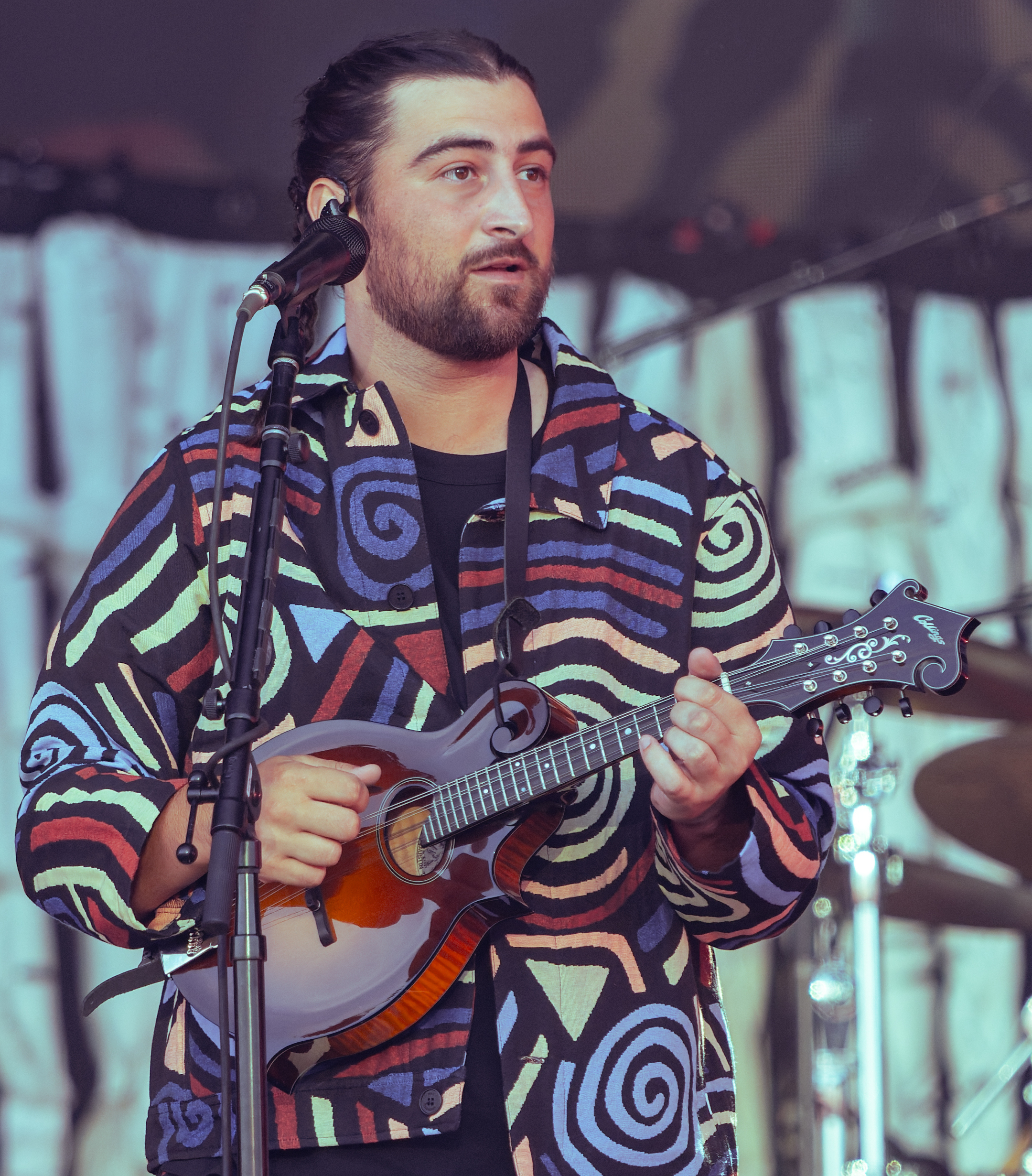
Noah Kahan (pictured in 2025) performed a cover version of "Lacy".

Rodrigo performed a cover of American singer-songwriter Noah Kahan's 2022 single "Stick Season" at BBC Radio 1's Live Lounge in October 2023. He responded favorably and sang a live cover of "Lacy" during the same segment on November 23, 2023, alongside a band and American folk-pop group Tiny Habits. Kahan chose the song because he believed that it highlighted his favorite aspects of Rodrigo's songwriting and that its spirited nature made listeners "feel an emotion we've all experienced before". He later described it as one of the most difficult songs he had ever covered in terms of emphasizing the lyrics subtly without letting his voice overpower them.

Billboard's Ashley Iasimone and American Songwriter's Alex Hopper described Kahan's cover as lulling and gentle. Sadie Bell of People believed the cover made "Lacy" a "slowed-down lovelorn ballad", infusing it with longing and sorrow and being tender yet brimming with emotion. Describing the rendition as heartfelt in Consequence, Jo Vito thought that Kahan used a gentle falsetto while navigating the rise and fall of the melody, and the consistent backbeat, strumming banjo, and layered harmonies merged to create a folksy and robust soundscape during the climax. Uproxx's Lexi Lane believed he emphasized the quieter notes of the song, making it more emotional. She felt the second verse featured an up-tempo folk instrumentation, and Eli Ordonez of NME thought the cover had influences of country music. Geffen, Mercury, and Republic Records released a 7-inch colored vinyl single with Rodrigo's cover of "Stick Season" and Kahan's cover of "Lacy" as the A-side and B-side, respectively, on April 20, 2024, to commemorate Record Store Day.

== Credits and personnel ==
Credits are adapted from the liner notes of Guts.

- Dan Nigro – producer, songwriter, drums, engineer, acoustic guitar, electric guitar, vocal producer, bass, synthesizer
- Olivia Rodrigo – songwriter
- Dani Perez – engineer
- Chris Kasych – engineer
- Austen Healey – assistant recording engineer
- Chappell Roan – background vocals
- Randy Merrill – mastering
- Mitch McCarthy – mixing

== Charts ==
Chart positions for "Lacy"
Chart (2023)	Peak position
Australia (ARIA)	25
Canada Hot 100 (Billboard)	24
Global 200 (Billboard)	20
Greece (IFPI)	65
Ireland (Billboard)	18
New Zealand (Recorded Music NZ)	16
Portugal (AFP)	52
UK (Billboard)	24
UK Audio Streaming (Official Charts)	26
US Billboard Hot 100	23

== Certifications ==
Certifications for "Lacy"
Region	Certification	Certified units/sales
Australia (ARIA)	Platinum	70,000^{‡}
Brazil (Pro-Música Brasil)	Gold	20,000^{‡}
Canada (Music Canada)	2× Platinum	160,000^{‡}
New Zealand (RMNZ)	Platinum	30,000^{‡}
United Kingdom (BPI)	Gold	400,000^{‡}
^{‡} Sales+streaming figures based on certification alone.
