= Love Is Embarrassing =

2023 song by Olivia Rodrigo

Song by Olivia Rodrigo

from the album Guts
- Released: September 8, 2023
- Studio: Amusement (Los Angeles); East West (Los Angeles)
- Genre: New wave; pop rock; synth-pop
- Length: 2:34
- Label: Geffen
- Songwriters: Olivia Rodrigo; Dan Nigro
- Producer: Dan Nigro

Lyric video
- "Love Is Embarrassing" on YouTube

"Love Is Embarrassing" (stylized in all lowercase) is a song by American singer-songwriter Olivia Rodrigo from her second studio album, Guts (2023). Rodrigo wrote the song with its producer, Dan Nigro. It became available as the album's ninth track on September 8, 2023, when it was released by Geffen Records. A new wave, pop rock, and synth-pop song, "Love Is Embarrassing" has self-deprecating lyrics in which Rodrigo derides a former love interest and expresses embarrassment about how much she was attracted to him.

Music critics found the lyricism of "Love Is Embarrassing" relatable and compared Rodrigo's vocals and the production to the work of other artists. The song reached the top 30 in Australia, Canada, Ireland, New Zealand, and the United States and entered the charts in some other countries. It received platinum certifications in Australia, Brazil, and Canada. Rodrigo included the song on the set list of her 2024–2025 concert tour, the Guts World Tour. She suffered a wardrobe malfunction while performing the song during the London tour stop, which critics believed she handled well.

== Background and release ==
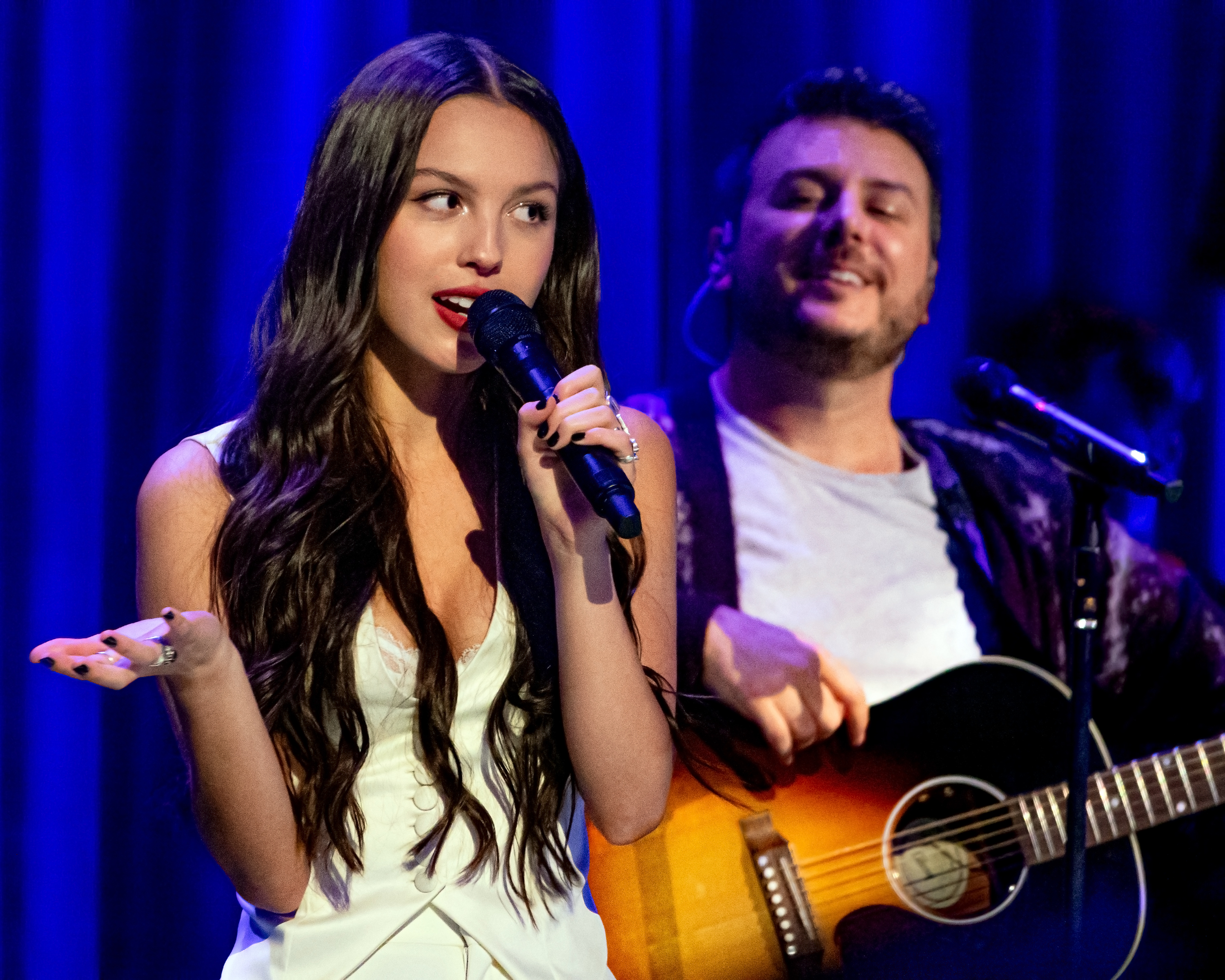
"Love Is Embarrassing" was the last song Olivia Rodrigo and Dan Nigro decided to include on Guts (2023).

Olivia Rodrigo released her debut studio album, Sour, in May 2021 at age 18, after which she took a six-month break from songwriting. She conceived the follow-up album, Guts (2023), at the age of 19, while experiencing what Rodrigo described as "lots of confusion, mistakes, awkwardness & good old fashioned teen angst". Sour's producer, Dan Nigro, returned to produce every track on it. They wrote over 100 songs, including the more rock-oriented tracks on the album because they drew a bigger reaction from her audiences during live shows. Guts was created over a period of 10 months; songwriting and recording consumed the first eight, and the final two were used for mixing and fine-tuning.

One night, Rodrigo lay in bed replaying every embarrassing moment in her life and feeling self-conscious. She wrote "Love Is Embarrassing" as the last song for the album in her living room the following morning. Rodrigo presented it to Nigro just five days before Guts was due for submission to her label Geffen Records, and it was included on the album even though he was hesitant to add it that late. Rodrigo announced the album title on June 26, 2023, and its lead single, "Vampire", was released four days later. On August 1, 2023, she revealed Guts' tracklist, which features "Love Is Embarrassing" as the ninth track. The song became available for digital download on the album, which was released on September 8, 2023. It was used in a commercial that Rodrigo released in partnership with Sony in November 2023.

== Composition ==
"Love Is Embarrassing"
"Love Is Embarrassing" is a new wave, pop rock, and synth-pop song with influences of riot grrrl, and pop-punk. Its chorus includes lively guitars, and the bridge received comparisons to the work of Devo.

"Love Is Embarrassing" is 2 minutes and 34 seconds long. Nigro handled production and vocal production, and he engineered it with Dave Schiffman. Nigro played acoustic guitar, electric guitar, bass, synthesizer, and programmed drums; Garrett Ray played drums; and Sam Stewart played guitar. Serban Ghenea mixed the song at SLS Studios in London with assistance from Bryce Bordone, and Randy Merrill mastered it. Recording took place at Amusement Studios and EastWest Studios in Los Angeles.

"Love Is Embarrassing" is a new wave, pop rock, and synth-pop song, with influences of riot grrrl and pop-punk. Rolling Stone's Rob Sheffield described it as an "impeccable eighties new-wave tribute" and one of Guts' "bops [that] go for a 1980s synth/guitar new wave chug". The song's chorus includes lively guitars and a new wave-style beat, and its bridge received comparisons to the work of Devo. Rodrigo's tone conveys complete disenchantment with a love interest, and she keeps shifting her delivery; Sheffield believed she sings with a "hiccup in her voice" reminiscent of Dale Bozzio of the band Missing Persons. He compared the fusion of synthesizers and guitars to the Cars, the Go-Go's, and Missing Persons, while Lucas Martins of Beats Per Minute thought Rodrigo's "looseness and her rockstar swagger" were evocative of Debbie Harry. Other artists to whose work "Love Is Embarrassing" was compared include Two Door Cinema Club, Kelly Clarkson, Marina and the Diamonds, Karen O, Bryan Ferry, Kathleen Hanna, Paramore, and Alvvays.

According to The New York Times' Jon Caramanica and the Los Angeles Times' Mikael Wood, the title of "Love Is Embarrassing" references the work of Sky Ferreira. "Love Is Embarrassing" has self-deprecating lyrics, in which Rodrigo derides a former love interest and feels self-conscious about how much she was attracted to him. She recounts how she informed her friends that he was "the one" just a month after meeting him, after which he immediately disappointed her. Rodrigo reevaluates her feelings and comes to the conclusion that love is "fucking embarrassing", describing him as "some weird second string loser" who is not worth her time. She regrets consoling him when his ex-girlfriend began dating a new man and recalls her anger when he found a different girl who was like Rodrigo. Despite this experience, Rodrigo admits that she still fantasizes about romantic dramas in her mind and will continue seeking love: "I'm planning out my wedding with some guy I'm never marrying / I'm giving up, I'm giving up, but I keep coming back for more." Billboard's Jason Lipshutz described "Love Is Embarrassing" as a "diary-ready account of young heartbreak".

== Critical reception ==
Critics commented on where "Love Is Embarrassing" placed among Guts tracks and its production. AllMusic's Heather Phares and Consequence's Paolo Ragusa named it a standout track on the album. Lipshutz believed the song would find an audience in new wave fans and proved Rodrigo's unparalleled talent for blending deep musical genre exploration with intimate and diary-like stories of young heartbreak. Caramanica believed it displayed how Rodrigo had not given into pressure to work with pop producers like Max Martin and "render[ed] her intimacies on a grand stage" instead, and Lucas Martins thought Guts tracks like it promised Rodrigo a bright future in rock music. On the other hand, Gabriel Saulog of Billboard Philippines thought the song was one of the weaker and more forgettable tracks on Guts and would have benefited from a longer duration, but he found that its spirited hooks were enjoyable.

Some reviewers commented on Rodrigo's vocal performance. Wood believed she displayed malleable vocal phrasing which was able to keep up with the evolving distorted guitars. The Line of Best Fit's Matthew Kim thought her self-critical delivery of the line "Jesus, what was I even doing?" amplified and complemented the album's diverse spectrum of emotions.

Critics praised the lyricism on "Love Is Embarrassing" as relatable. Lipshutz believed the song would resonate with anybody who has cried about an ex-partner and regretted it later. Nick Levine of BBC News thought it would resonate with audiences of many ages despite being "set in high school". Caramanica believed "Love Is Embarrassing" displayed Rodrigo's remarkably pure songwriting which captured raw emotions even in the most stylized lyrics. Slant Magazine's Charles Lyons-Burt believed her lyricism had become more precise on Guts than on Sour, which improved the resonance of both her self-criticism and critiques of others, and songs like "Love Is Embarrassing" revealed different attitudes or emotions with each listen due to their conflicted cores.

Reviewers highlighted specific lyrics. In September 2023, Sheffield ranked "Love Is Embarrassing" as Rodrigo's 20th-best song, picking "You found a new version of me/And I damn near started World War 3" as his favorite lyric from the song. Nylon placed the lyric alongside "Just watch as I crucify myself/ For some weird second string/ Loser who's not worth mentioning" in its list of Guts' most impeccable lyrics, and GQ included the latter in its list of the album's standout and "gutsiest" lyrics. Ragusa believed it was an example of her sophisticated songwriting, highlighting the choice of the word "crucify" as immensely theatrical and the description of the love interest as absolutely hilarious.

== Commercial performance ==
"Love Is Embarrassing" debuted at number 25 on the US Billboard Hot 100 issued for September 23, 2023. In Canada, the song entered at number 29 on the Canadian Hot 100 issued for the same date and was certified platinum by Music Canada. In the United Kingdom, it debuted at number 24 on the Official Audio Streaming Chart and number 21 on Billboard. "Love Is Embarrassing" received a gold certification in the United Kingdom from the British Phonographic Industry, and the Official Charts Company declared it her 20th-biggest song in the country in February 2024.

In Australia, "Love Is Embarrassing" entered at number 26 and was certified platinum by the Australian Recording Industry Association. The song debuted at number 23 in New Zealand. It charted at number 22 on the Billboard Global 200. "Love Is Embarrassing" also reached national record charts at number 14 on the Sweden Heatseeker chart, number 20 in Ireland, number 66 in Greece, and number 67 in Portugal. The song received a platinum certification in Brazil.

== Live performances ==
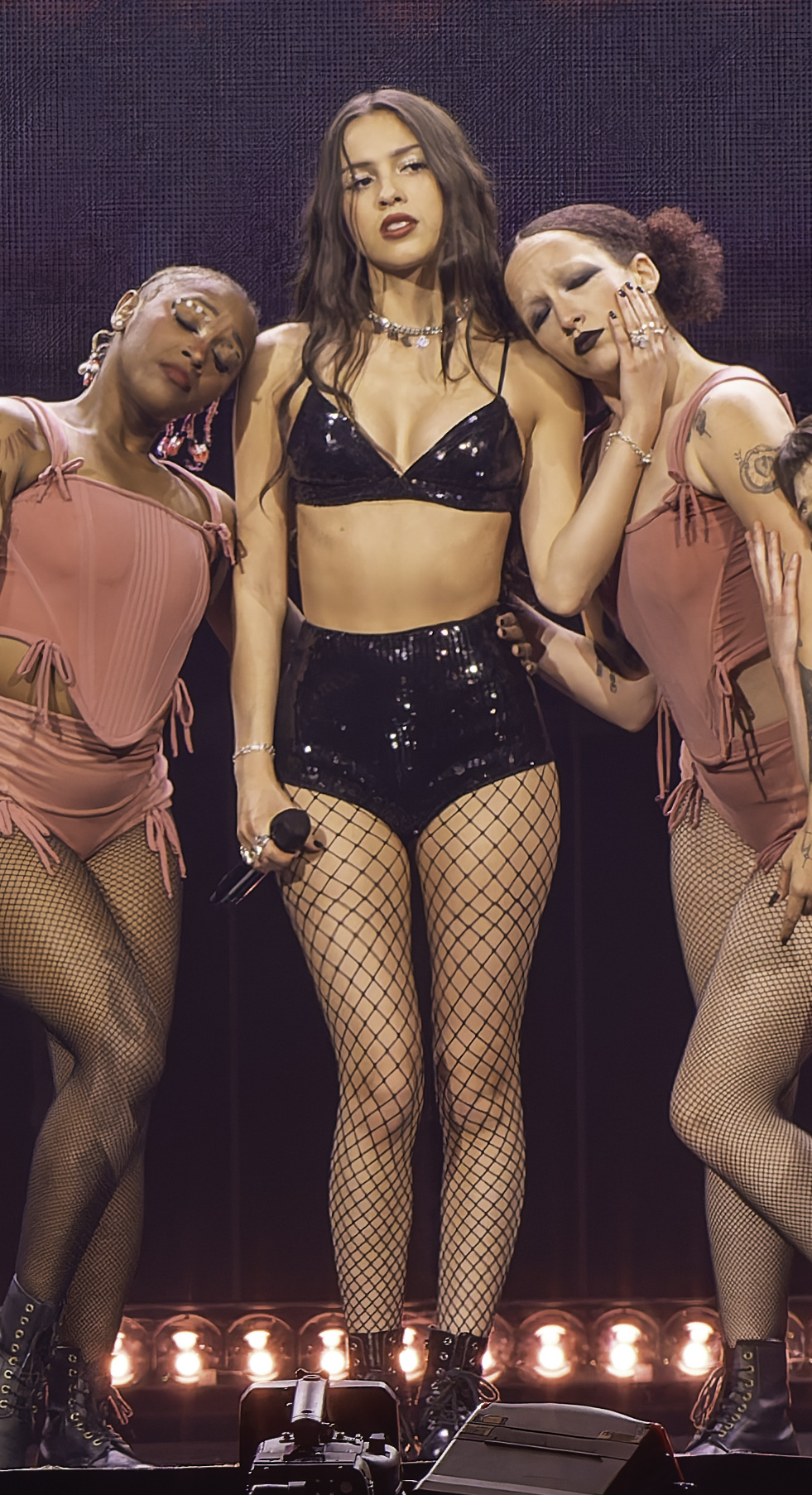
Rodrigo performing "Love Is Embarrassing" on the Guts World Tour in May 2024

Rodrigo opened her Tiny Desk concert in December 2023 by performing "Love Is Embarrassing". The song was also included on the set list for her 2024–2025 Guts World Tour. The performance incorporates elements of Toni Basil's 1982 song "Mickey". During the number, Rodrigo performs choreography with female background dancers, which Miami New Times' Celia Almeida described as "meant to be silly and, well, embarrassing". Rolling Stone's Tomás Mier believed that Rodrigo channeled pop artists like Cyndi Lauper, and The Tennessean's Audrey Gibbs compared the dancers to the lineup in "Cell Block Tango" from the musical Chicago (1975).

While Rodrigo was reprising it at the tour's stop in London's O2 Arena, the laces of her bandeau top broke. She held the top to keep it from falling off, drawing the attention of a dancer who tried to fix it, while the group continued performing high-energy choreography. Rodrigo slightly subdued her dancing during the first chorus when the wardrobe malfunction happened, stating: "This is fucking embarrassing. I almost flashed you guys, but it's OK now!", and carried out the intended choreography during the second chorus. Critics praised how she handled the situation, and Parade's Sammi Burke believed that Rodrigo's voice remained steady through it. Sydney Bucksbaum of Entertainment Weekly and Logan DeLoye of iHeartRadio thought that the dancer also flawlessly completed the high-energy choreography while keeping hold of her top, seamlessly performing as if it were planned, similarly to Rodrigo. Rodrigo sang "Love Is Embarrassing" during her Lollapalooza Chile set in March 2025.

== Credits and personnel ==
Credits are adapted from the liner notes of Guts.

- Dan Nigro – producer, songwriter, engineer, acoustic guitar, electric guitar, vocal producer, bass, synthesizer, drum programming, background vocals
- Olivia Rodrigo – vocals, background vocals, songwriter
- Garrett Ray – drums
- Sam Stewart – guitar
- Dave Schiffman – engineer
- Randy Merrill – mastering
- Serban Ghenea – mixing
- Bryce Bordone – mixing assistance

== Charts ==
=== Weekly charts ===
Weekly chart positions for "Love Is Embarrassing"
Chart (2023)	Peak position
Australia (ARIA)	26
Canada Hot 100 (Billboard)	29
Global 200 (Billboard)	22
Greece (IFPI)	66
Ireland (Billboard)	20
New Zealand (Recorded Music NZ)	23
Portugal (AFP)	67
Sweden Heatseeker (Sverigetopplistan)	14
UK (Billboard)	21
UK Streaming (OCC)	24
US Billboard Hot 100	25
US Hot Rock & Alternative Songs (Billboard)	6

=== Year-end charts ===
Year-end chart position for "Love Is Embarrassing"
Chart (2023)	Position
US Hot Rock & Alternative Songs (Billboard)	75
Chart (2024)	Position
US Hot Rock & Alternative Songs (Billboard)	96

== Certifications ==
Certifications for "Love Is Embarrassing"
Region	Certification	Certified units/sales
Australia (ARIA)	Platinum	70,000^{‡}
Brazil (Pro-Música Brasil)	Platinum	40,000^{‡}
Canada (Music Canada)	Platinum	80,000^{‡}
New Zealand (RMNZ)	Gold	15,000^{‡}
United Kingdom (BPI)	Gold	400,000^{‡}
^{‡} Sales+streaming figures based on certification alone.
