= Ballad of a Homeschooled Girl =

Song by Olivia Rodrigo

from the album Guts
- Released: September 8, 2023
- Studio: Amusement (Los Angeles); East West (Los Angeles)
- Genre: Garage punk; alternative rock; pop-punk; pop rock; emo
- Length: 3:23
- Label: Geffen
- Songwriters: Olivia Rodrigo; Dan Nigro
- Producer: Dan Nigro

Lyric video
- "Ballad of a Homeschooled Girl" on YouTube

"Ballad of a Homeschooled Girl" (stylized in all lowercase) is a song by American singer-songwriter Olivia Rodrigo from her second studio album, Guts (2023). Rodrigo wrote the song with the album's producer, Dan Nigro. The song became available as the album's fifth track on September 8, 2023, when it was released by Geffen Records. A garage punk, alternative rock, pop-punk, pop rock, and emo song with influences of post-punk, "Ballad of a Homeschooled Girl" is about social anxiety and features Rodrigo recounting embarrassing experiences at a party.

Music critics praised the lyricism of "Ballad of a Homeschooled Girl" and found it relatable and funny, also commenting on the production. The song was nominated for Best Rock Song at the 66th Annual Grammy Awards, marking Rodrigo's first Grammy nomination in a rock category. It reached the top 25 in Australia, Canada, Ireland, New Zealand, and the United States and entered the charts in some other countries. Rodrigo performed "Ballad of a Homeschooled Girl" on Jimmy Kimmel Live! and included it on the set list of her 2024–2025 concert tour, the Guts World Tour.

== Background and release ==
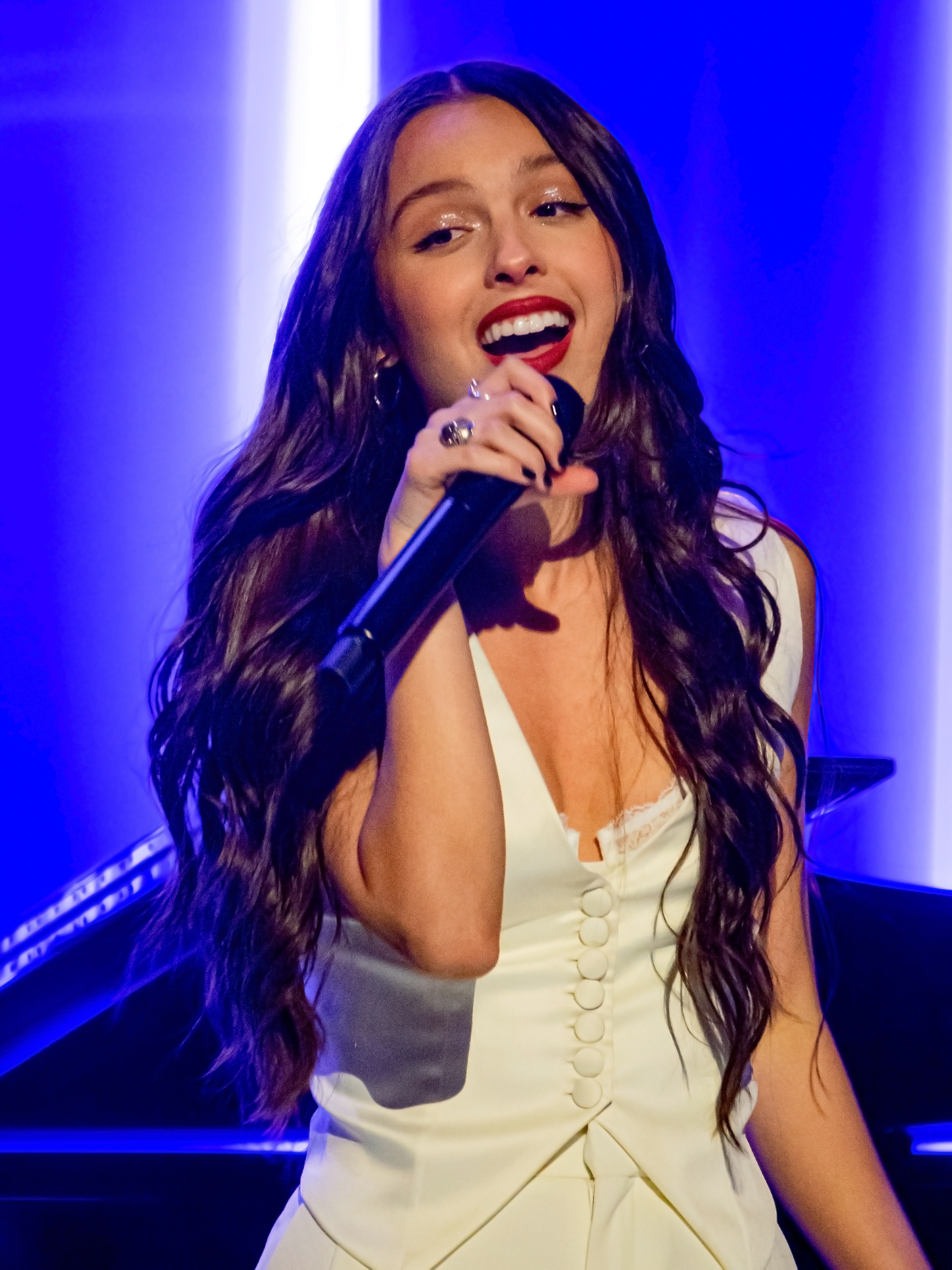
"Ballad of a Homeschooled Girl" draws inspiration from Olivia Rodrigo's (pictured in 2023) experience being homeschooled.

After releasing debut studio album, Sour, in May 2021, Olivia Rodrigo took a break from songwriting for six months. She conceived the follow-up album, Guts (2023), at the age of 19, while experiencing what Rodrigo described as "lots of confusion, mistakes, awkwardness & good old fashioned teen angst". Sour's producer, Dan Nigro, returned to produce every track on it. They wrote over 100 songs and included the more rock-oriented tracks on the album because they drew a bigger reaction from her audiences during live shows.

Rodrigo explored lyrical themes like heartbreak, body image, and social and adolescent anxieties on Guts. Reflecting on this, she said much of the album details the confusion of entering young adulthood, finding one's identity, and choosing whom to associate with; she thought this was a universal experience of emerging from disillusionment that many people faced. Rodrigo and Nigro wrote "Ballad of a Homeschooled Girl" early on in the creation process of Guts, among a set of gleeful and uptempo songs. The song drew inspiration from the fact that Rodrigo was homeschooled as a teenager and missed out on a regular high school experience.

Rodrigo announced the album title on June 26, 2023, and its lead single, "Vampire", was released four days later. On August 1, 2023, she revealed Guts's tracklist, with "Ballad of a Homeschooled Girl" as the fifth track. The song became available for digital download on the album, which was released by Geffen Records on September 8, 2023. It drew a divided fan reaction; some praised its relatability while others found a lyric about Rodrigo accidentally liking gay men insensitive. The following week, chain restaurant Chipotle Mexican Grill referenced the lyric in an Instagram caption, replacing the word "gay" with "guac": "Every guy I like is guac", to which Rodrigo responded positively.

The song is set to be featured as part of the on-disc setlist of upcoming rhythm game, Stage Tour.

== Composition ==
"Ballad of a Homeschooled Girl"
Rodrogo repeats the lyric "It's social suicide" and lilts "ah-ah's" during the post-chorus (sampled), which recalls bands like Everclear and Third Eye Blind and proves her affinity for 1990s alternative rock, according to Billboard's Jason Lipshutz.

"Ballad of a Homeschooled Girl" is 3 minutes and 23 seconds long. It was recorded at Amusement Studios and East West Studios in Los Angeles. Nigro produced the song, and he engineered it with Sam Stewart, Sterling Laws, Dave Schiffman, and Jasmine Chen. He played guitar, percussion, and programmed drums; Erick Serna and Stewart played electric guitar; Ryan Linvill played bass; and Laws played drums. Spike Stent mixed the song at SLS Studios in London, and Randy Merrill mastered it.

"Ballad of a Homeschooled Girl" is a pop-punk, pop rock, alternative rock, garage punk, and emo song with influences of post-punk. The Independent's Helen Brown described the song as "a solid wedge of American indie", and The Guardian's Alexis Petridis thought it had "a hint of grunge-era alt-rock". According to John Murphy of MusicOMH, it begins like a Weezer song, and others noted that it incorporates grungy guitars and quiet-loud dynamics. Rodrigo raps during the verses of "Ballad of a Homeschooled Girl", vocalizing in a "bratty" way according to Elle's Erica Gonzales, and she delivers the chorus in a breathless manner without pausing. Writing for Paste, Rachel Saywitz believed that the brash changes in the song's vocal styling represent Rodrigo's knowledge of the lyrics' absurdity. She repeats the lyric "It's social suicide" and lilts "ah-ah's" during the post-chorus, which recalls bands like Everclear and Third Eye Blind and proves her affinity for 1990s alternative rock, according to Billboard's Jason Lipshutz.

"Ballad of a Homeschooled Girl" has lyrics about social anxiety and embarrassment caused by low self-esteem. In a monologue format, Rodrigo recounts her embarrassing experiences at a party the previous night akin to a personal journal entry. She takes a self-deprecating tone and uses dark humor to cope with her social issues. In the first verse, Rodrigo details feeling out of place and disconnected and hating her clothes. She recalls breaking a glass, stumbling, and telling people more than she should have at the party. Rodrigo considers these incidents "social suicide[s]" which make her want to hide herself. In the second verse, she remembers making online searches to learn how to start a conversation and accidentally flirting with an attractive gay man, which is followed by her admission that most men she is attracted to are homosexual: "Everything I do is tragic, every guy I like is gay." In the outro, Rodrigo sings about mistaking someone's mother for their wife and calling them by the wrong name. The Atlantic's Spencer Kornhaber compared the song's theme of social anxiety to 1990s teen films. Critics interpreted it as an expression of the social awkwardness Rodrigo experienced as a result of pursuing her acting career and being homeschooled.

== Critical reception ==
Many critics viewed the lyricism of "Ballad of a Homeschooled Girl" as relatable. (Note: like Lipshutz, Elle's Erica Gonzales, Beats Per Minute's Lucas Martins, Clash's Alex Berry, Nylon's Steffanee Wang, and Vulture's Craig Jenkins) The Line of Best Fit's Matthew Kim thought the song more resembled a "stream-of-consciousness journal entry" rather than a well-calculated political critique, and Clash's Alex Berry believed the lyrics offered wisdom and comfort while maintaining the "confused voice of a young person trying to navigate the world". Though Lucas Martins of Beats Per Minute considered it excessively dramatic, he believed it showcased Rodrigo's skill of bringing a ballad's emotionality to a pop rock production. Writing for Billboard Philippines, Gabriel Saulog thought the song's ability to evoke anxiety-inducing memories for many listeners showcased her skillful songwriting and ability to tell a compelling story through vivid imagery.

Some reviewers found the lyrics funny. (Note: like DIY's Lisa Wright, The Line of Best Fit's Matthew Kim, Sputnikmusic's Sowing, and Out's Mey Rude) The New Yorker's Amanda Petrusich considered it full of outstanding one-liners and among Rodrigo's best songs which depicted her "clowning on herself". Sowing of Sputnikmusic believed the song seamlessly blended insightful comments with disarming humor, creating a satisfying emotional experience for the listener. Murphy thought its self-deprecating humor was underscored by a stream of anger and vulnerability beneath it. The line about Rodrigo liking gay men was included on GQ's list of the album's standout and "gutsiest" lyrics and Nylon's list of its "impeccable" lyrics.

Some critics commented on the production choices on "Ballad of a Homeschooled Girl". Petridis discussed the song amongst tracks that proved Guts had a harder sound than Sour, adding more live instrumentation while taking the latter as its starting point. The New York Times's Jon Caramanica believed it displayed how Rodrigo had not given into pressure to work with producers like Max Martin and "render[ed] her intimacies on a grand stage" instead. Lipshutz thought the whole song embodied "a sense of sonic and lyrical purpose". Rob Sheffield of Rolling Stone placed "Ballad of a Homeschooled Girl" at the bottom of his September 2023 ranking of Rodrigo's discography. He liked the song title's potential reference to Bob Dylan's song "Ballad of a Thin Man" (1965) but viewed the chorus as a let-down. Sheffield picked his favorite lyric: "I'm on the outside of the greatest inside joke."

The Washington Post's Chris Richards ranked "Ballad of a Homeschooled Girl" as the eighth-best song of the year and a standout track on Guts. Among Rodrigo's six nominations at the 66th Annual Grammy Awards, it was nominated for Best Rock Song, marking her first appearance in a rock category.

== Commercial performance ==
"Ballad of a Homeschooled Girl" debuted at number 24 on the US Billboard Hot 100 issued for September 23, 2023. In Canada, the song entered at number 25 on the Canadian Hot 100 issued for the same date and was certified platinum by Music Canada. It debuted at number 20 on the United Kingdom's Official Audio Streaming Chart and on Billboard's UK Songs chart. "Ballad of a Homeschooled Girl" received a silver certification in the United Kingdom from the British Phonographic Industry.

In Australia, "Ballad of a Homeschooled Girl" entered at number 22 and received a gold certification from the Australian Recording Industry Association. The song debuted at number 18 in New Zealand. It charted at number 21 on the Billboard Global 200. "Ballad of a Homeschooled Girl" also charted at number 17 in Ireland, number 51 in Portugal, and number 53 in Greece. The song received a platinum certification in Brazil.

== Live performances ==
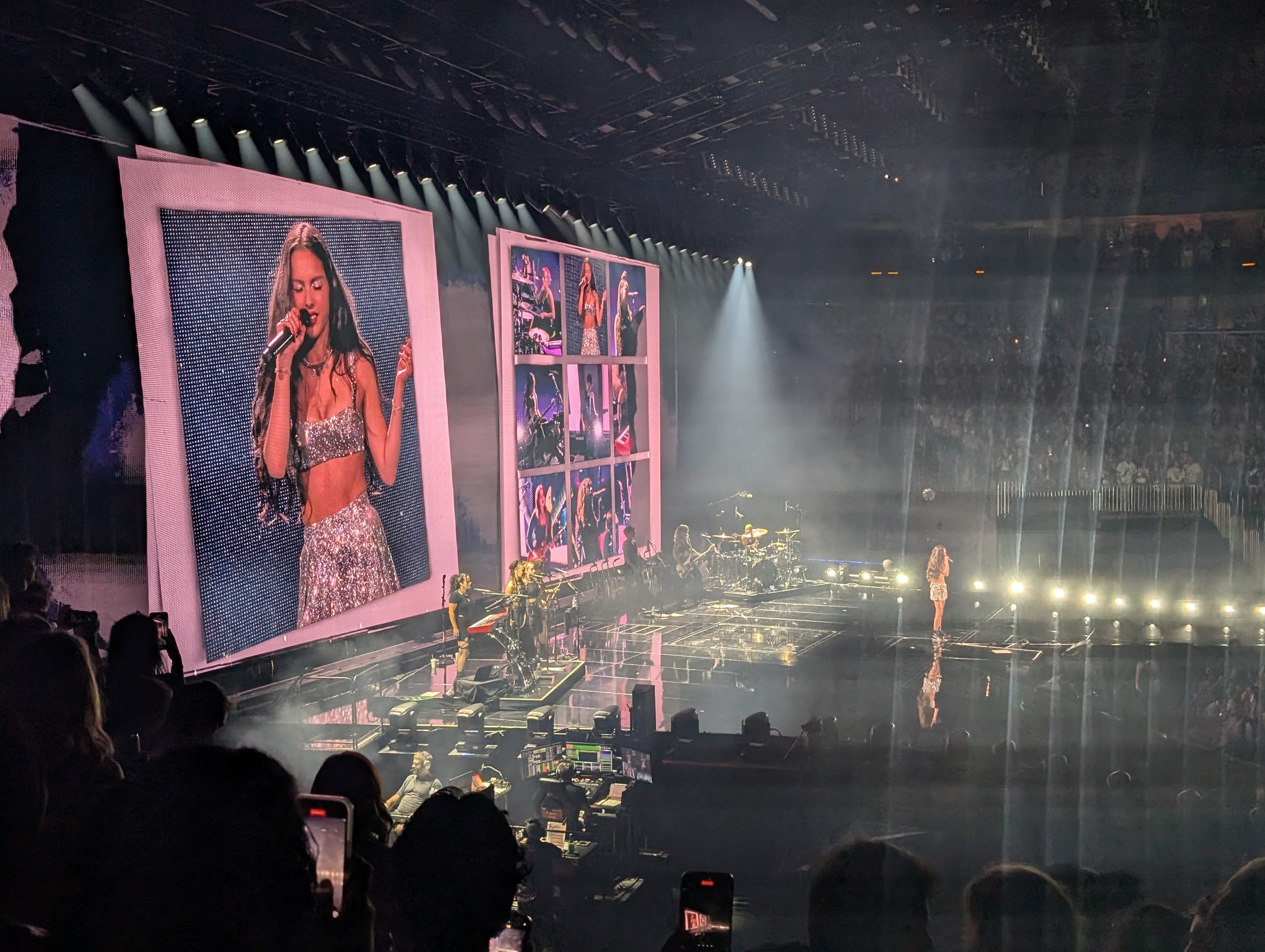
Rodrigo performing "Ballad of a Homeschooled Girl" on the Guts World Tour in July 2024

Rodrigo performed "Ballad of a Homeschooled Girl" live for the first time in an acoustic version at the Ace Hotel Los Angeles on October 9, 2023, in a concert exclusively for American Express cardholders. On October 24, she reprised the song on Jimmy Kimmel Live!. Six days later, American Songwriter's Cillea Houghton ranked it as Rodrigo's third-most energetic performance; she believed Rodrigo was expressive and embodied a rockstar, showcasing her evolution as a performer.

"Ballad of a Homeschooled Girl" was included as the second song on the set list of Rodrigo's 2024–2025 concert tour, the Guts World Tour, between "Bad Idea Right?" (2023) and "Vampire". She performed it in a silver two-piece outfit with an all-female five-member band and two background singers. Lynn Green of The Columbus Dispatch noted that the songs were extremely difficult to hear as the audience shouted them loudly, among which "Every guy I like is gay" was one of the most loudly screamed lyrics by fans. Rolling Stone's Tomás Mier believed that the "yearbook-esque imagery" used for the "Ballad of a Homeschooled Girl" and "Vampire" performances harkened back to Rodrigo's teenage years. Consequence's Scoop Harrison called "Bad Idea Right?" and those two songs a "one-two-three punch". "Ballad of a Homeschooled Girl" was included in the tour's associated concert film, Olivia Rodrigo: Guts World Tour (2024). In 2025, Rodrigo sang it during a string of festivals including Lollapalooza Chile, Governors Ball, and Glastonbury.

== Credits and personnel ==
Credits are adapted from the liner notes of Guts.

- Dan Nigro – producer, songwriter, engineer, guitar, percussion, vocal producer, drum programming
- Olivia Rodrigo – songwriter
- Erick Serna – electric guitar
- Ryan Linvill – bass
- Sam Stewart – electric guitar, engineer
- Sterling Laws – drums, engineer
- Dave Schiffman – engineer
- Jasmine Chen – engineer
- Randy Merrill – mastering
- Spike Stent – mixing
- Matt Wolach – mixing assistance

== Charts ==
=== Weekly charts ===
Weekly chart positions for "Ballad of a Homeschooled Girl"
Chart (2023)	Peak position
Australia (ARIA)	22
Canada Hot 100 (Billboard)	25
Global 200 (Billboard)	21
Greece (IFPI)	53
Ireland (Billboard)	17
New Zealand (Recorded Music NZ)	18
Portugal (AFP)	51
UK (Billboard)	20
UK Streaming (OCC)	20
US Billboard Hot 100	24
US Hot Rock & Alternative Songs (Billboard)	5

=== Year-end chart ===
Year-end chart position for "Ballad of a Homeschooled Girl"
Chart (2023)	Position
US Hot Rock & Alternative Songs (Billboard)	73
Chart (2024)	Position
US Hot Rock & Alternative Songs (Billboard)	97

== Certifications ==
Certifications for "Ballad of a Homeschooled Girl"
Region	Certification	Certified units/sales
Australia (ARIA)	Platinum	70,000^{‡}
Brazil (Pro-Música Brasil)	Platinum	40,000^{‡}
Canada (Music Canada)	Platinum	80,000^{‡}
New Zealand (RMNZ)	Gold	15,000^{‡}
United Kingdom (BPI)	Silver	200,000^{‡}
^{‡} Sales+streaming figures based on certification alone.
