= Olivia Rodrigo: One Night Only at Warsaw =

2026 concert by Olivia Rodrigo

One Night Only
- Promotional concert by Olivia Rodrigo
- Promotional poster
- Location: 261 Driggs Avenue; Greenpoint, Brooklyn; New York, United States
- Venue: Warsaw
- Associated album: You Seem Pretty Sad for a Girl So in Love
- Date: August 6, 2026
- Duration: 62 minutes
- Attendance: Approximately 1000

One Night Only was a one-off concert by American singer-songwriter Olivia Rodrigo, held at event venue Warsaw in New York City on August 6, 2026. The concert—one of multiple small-venue performances held by Rodrigo in promotion of her third studio album You Seem Pretty Sad for a Girl So in Love (2026) and prior to her 2026–2027 arena tour the Unraveled Tour—was announced the same day it took place; tickets were only available at the venue's box office. More than half of the set list was from the album. The concert received positive reviews from attending journalists for its intimacy, Rodrigo's vocals, the band's technical proficiency, and the song selection.

== Background ==
Olivia Rodrigo released her third studio album, You Seem Pretty Sad for a Girl So in Love, on June 12, 2026, after having announced it in April. A concert tour in support of the album, the Unraveled Tour, is scheduled to start in September 2026. Leading up to the album, Rodrigo performed an invite-only one-off concert, billed as One Night Only, at the Echo in Los Angeles on April 24, 2026. On April 26, 2026, she made a surprise appearance at an open mic night in Pete's Candy Store, a venue in New York City.

It was announced on August 6, 2026, via social media at 10 a.m. local time, that a second One Night Only concert would be taking place later that evening at Warsaw, a venue in the Greenpoint neighborhood of New York City. The tickets, all priced at $25, were available exclusively at Warsaw's box office; the venue announced via social media at approximately noon that tickets had sold out. Warsaw, located at 261 Driggs Avenue, has been described as having a capacity of approximately 1000 or 1100.

== Concert ==
The concert began at 8:20 p.m. and lasted for sixty-two minutes. Exclusive "One Night Only" posters were given away to attendees as they left. Rodrigo was accompanied by a five-piece band. The all-female-or-non-binary group, "almost entirely holdovers from the Sour and Guts tours", had performed with Rodrigo at previous 2026 concerts including at Primavera Sound and on Saturday Night Live. Variety's Jem Aswad described Rodrigo's demeanor throughout as "her usual effervescent self, bouncing, spinning, holding out her arms, pumping her fists, and leading the audience in several singalongs". She performed multiple songs solo at the piano.

Rodrigo told the crowd that the concert was the first time that many songs from You Seem Pretty Sad for a Girl So in Love were being performed. Nine songs from the concert's fifteen-song set list were from the album. Some journalists noted that Rodrigo had performed many of the songs on Austin City Limits the week prior but that her episode had not yet aired, meaning that fan videos of the concert effectively served as the live debuts of several tracks for the general public.

The "Honeybee" performance featured an "understated" arrangement. "Making the Bed", from Rodrigo's second studio album Guts (2023), was performed, with Rodrigo playing piano while singing. She introduced the song as a deep cut that she does not perform often. As her performance of the ballad "Less" came to a close, she pulled out a tissue and seemingly wiped away tears, before shouting "Key change!", leading into "Expectations". According to The Hollywood Reporter's Caitlin Huston, "Expectations" featured the concert's most significant moment of crowd work, getting the men to sing "She's got big expectations!" and the women to sing "I've got real big expectations!" as a call-and-response.

=== Set list ===
This set list has been adapted from The Hollywood Reporter and NME.

1. "Drop Dead"
2. "U + Me = ＜3"
3. "Stupid Song"
4. "My Way"
5. "Bad Idea Right?"
6. "Honeybee"
7. "Drivers License"
8. "Making the Bed"
9. "Maggots for Brains"
10. "All-American Bitch"
11. "Good 4 U"
12. "The Cure"
13. "Less"
14. "Expectations"
15. "Deja Vu"

=== "Purple (Happy Version)" ===
Following the concert, "Purple (Happy Version)"—an alternative version of "Purple", a song from You Seem Pretty Sad for a Girl So in Love—was shared to attendees' devices. The next day, "Purple (Happy Version)" was released to Bandcamp for streaming and $1.50 paid download. Proceeds from downloads are to be donated to the fund for Rodrigo's charitable music festival Daisy Chain Fields.

== Reception ==
The concert received positive reviews from attending journalists. Billboard's Joe Lynch wrote that the show was full of "hard-rocking highlight[s]" and that it made him confident in Rodrigo's and her band's musical chemistry for the upcoming Unraveled Tour. He also highlighted Rodrigo's performance of "The Cure", writing that it "showed off new shades of her voice" and mesmerized the crowd. In the same article, Kristen Wisneski praised the inclusion of album track "Making the Bed", which "[made] the intimate performance even more special", and the emotional potency of a simple arrangement for "Honeybee". The Guardian's Bryan Armen Graham gave the concert four stars out of five and called it a "thrillingly intimate showcase of [Rodrigo's] tour de force talent", praising her interactions with the crowd, the "lean" set list that "makes no attempt to miniaturize an arena production", the intentionality behind the song sequencing and mood shifts, the "excellent" backing band, and the decision to have a majority of the set be from You Seem Pretty Sad for a Girl So in Love instead of focusing on her biggest hits. Graham concluded that "If Glastonbury was a demonstration of Rodrigo's reach, Warsaw laid bare the charisma and precision beneath the scale." Variety's Jem Aswad was impressed by Rodrigo's vocals and the "razor-sharp" band.
