= The Unraveled Tour =

2026–2027 concert tour by Olivia Rodrigo

- Tour by Olivia Rodrigo
- Promotional poster
- Location: Europe; North America
- Associated album: You Seem Pretty Sad for a Girl So in Love
- Start date: September 25, 2026
- End date: May 10, 2027
- No. of shows: 86
- Supporting acts: Wolf Alice; Devon Again; The Last Dinner Party; Grace Ives; Die Spitz
- Website: store.oliviarodrigo.com/pages/tour

Olivia Rodrigo concert chronology
- Guts World Tour (2024–2025); The Unraveled Tour (2026–2027)

The Unraveled Tour is the third concert tour and second arena tour by American singer-songwriter Olivia Rodrigo in support of her third studio album, You Seem Pretty Sad for a Girl So in Love (2026). Comprising 86 shows across North America and Europe, the tour began on September 25, 2026, at the PeoplesBank Arena in Hartford, United States, and is set to conclude on May 10, 2027, at the O2 Arena in London, England. Wolf Alice, Devon Again, the Last Dinner Party, Grace Ives, and Die Spitz joined as supporting acts.

== Background and development ==
On April 2, 2026, Olivia Rodrigo announced her third studio album, You Seem Pretty Sad for a Girl So in Love, which was released on June 12. It was preceded by the lead single, "Drop Dead", on April 17. "The Cure", from which the tour borrows its title with the repeated lyric "I'm unraveled", followed as the second single on May 22.

On April 29, 2026, posters for the Unraveled Tour began appearing in some cities in the United States, including Inglewood and Sunrise. The following day, Rodrigo officially announced the tour and its initial dates on her social media platforms, totaling 40 shows across the United States, 6 shows in Canada, and 15 shows in Europe. In the same post, Wolf Alice, Devon Again, the Last Dinner Party, Grace Ives, and Die Spitz were announced as supporting acts. Presale for American Express card holders began on May 5, while general onsale began on May 7. For the United Kingdom, tickets were first available via an O2 presale on May 5. Fans could also register for presale access by pre-ordering You Seem Pretty Sad for a Girl So in Love or by signing up; those who had already pre-ordered it would automatically receive a code. In the week following the tour's announcement, Rodrigo added several dates for Boston, Inglewood, New York City, Amsterdam, London, Paris, and Barcelona due to the demand.

For the Unraveled Tour, Rodrigo offered a limited number of tickets priced at US$20 each, continuing a program that began with the Guts World Tour. Branded "Silver Star Tickets", they were designed for fan accessibility and affordability and were available only in pairs; purchasers were limited to two per order and guaranteed that they would be seated together during the concert. A portion of the tour's ticket proceeds also benefited Rodrigo's Fund 4 Good initiative, supporting community-based nonprofit organizations dedicated "to build[ing] an equitable and just future for all women and girls".

== Concert synopsis ==
Rodrigo performing in Chicago during the tour in October 2026

The Unraveled Tour runs for approximately two hours. The set list primarily features tracks from You Seem Pretty Sad for a Girl So in Love, while also incorporating songs from Rodrigo's previous albums, Sour (2021) and Guts (2023), as well as the single "Serena Joy". It is divided into six season-themed acts—beginning in Spring, cycling through Summer, Summer Twilight, Autumn, and Winter, and ending back in Spring—with the stage's visuals changing to reflect each season.

Rodrigo lies hidden among the many flowers covering the stage as she opens the concert's first Spring section with "Drop Dead". Wearing a white Dilara Fındıkoğlu babydoll dress, she performs a piano solo during "U + Me = <3", followed by "So American", for which she plays a heart-shaped guitar. Rodrigo closes the first act with "Good 4 U", and the band plays the intro to "Deja Vu" as she changes her costume. During Summer, Rodrigo performs "My Way", "Serena Joy", "Bad Idea Right?", and "Ballad of a Homeschooled Girl" in a tank top and hot pink shorts, before transitioning into Summer Twilight with "Vampire" and "Purple".

Donning a purple leather minidress and choker, Rodrigo opens the Autumn sequence with "Stupid Song", incorporating a heart-shaped stage with a ring of flowers. She performs a guitar solo during "Maggots for Brains", which is followed by "Traitor", "Begged", and "Cigarette Smoke", the last of which features smoke and strobe light effects. Rodrigo changes into a white pleated dress for the Winter act, which begins with the piano-led "Honeybee", "Favorite Crime", and "Drivers License", followed by "Less" on the stairs of the B-stage. The section closes with "The Cure", where Rodrigo stands center stage as she is soaked in rainwater during the song's bridge; her custom Hussein Chalayan dress washes away to reveal a red latex bodysuit underneath, ending the main concert.

Still wet from the previous act, Rodrigo returns to the stage in a white tank top and low-rise jeans to begin the encore and second Spring section with "Deja Vu" and "All-American Bitch". She then closes the show with "Expectations", during which she instructs the audience members to sing the line "I got big expectations / I got real big expectations".

== Critical reception ==
Rob Sheffield of Rolling Stone gave the opening show a positive review, describing it as "a showcase of Rodrigo's development as a live performer". He highlighted the flower-filled production, rain effects, costume changes, and the energy of her all-female band. Sheffield praised the set list, which combined songs from You Seem Pretty Sad for a Girl So in Love with material from her previous releases. He described "The Cure", during which Rodrigo is drenched by rain as her dress dissolves, as the emotional centerpiece of the show. Ashley Iasimone of Billboard praised the opening show for its set list, visuals, and intimate moments between Rodrigo and the audience. She highlighted the flower-themed production, multiple stages, and Rodrigo's interaction with fans throughout the arena. She described "The Cure" as the visual and emotional highlight of the concert.

== Set list ==
This set list is representative of the September 25, 2026, concert in Hartford, United States. It may not represent all concerts for the duration of the tour.

Act I: Spring

1. "Drop Dead"
2. "U + Me = <3"
3. "So American"
4. "Good 4 U"

Act II: Summer

5. "My Way"
6. "Serena Joy"
7. "Bad Idea Right?"
8. "Ballad of a Homeschooled Girl"

Act III: Summer Twilight

9. "Vampire"
10. "Purple"

Act IV: Autumn

11. "Stupid Song"
12. "Maggots for Brains"
13. "Traitor"
14. "Begged"
15. "Cigarette Smoke"

Act V: Winter

16. "Honeybee"
17. "Favorite Crime"
18. "Drivers License"
19. "Less"
20. "The Cure"

Encore: Spring

21. "Deja Vu"
22. "All-American Bitch"
23. "Expectations"

=== Alterations ===
- During the first shows in Pittsburgh, Atlanta, and Orlando, as well as both shows in Toronto, Rodrigo performed "Lacy".
- During the second show in Washington, D.C., Rodrigo performed "Love Is Embarrassing" and "Get Him Back!".
- During the first shows in Charlotte and Sunrise, the third show in Boston, and the second show in Philadelphia, Rodrigo performed "Can't Catch Me Now".
- During the second shows in Charlotte, Chicago, and Orlando, as well as the first show in Philadelphia, Rodrigo performed "What's Wrong with Me".
- During the first show in Chicago, Rodrigo performed "Happier".
- During the second show in Boston and the first show in Columbus, Rodrigo performed "Pretty Isn't Pretty".

== Tour dates ==
List of 2026 concerts
Date (2026)	City	Country	Venue	Supporting act(s)	Attendance	Gross
September 25	Hartford	United States	PeoplesBank Arena	Wolf Alice	—	—
September 26	Hartford	United States	PeoplesBank Arena	Wolf Alice	—	—
September 29	Pittsburgh	United States	PPG Paints Arena	Wolf Alice	—	—
September 30	Pittsburgh	United States	PPG Paints Arena	Wolf Alice	—	—
October 3	Washington, D.C.	United States	Capital One Arena	Wolf Alice	—	—
October 4	Washington, D.C.	United States	Capital One Arena	Wolf Alice	—	—
October 7	Charlotte	United States	Spectrum Center	Wolf Alice	—	—
October 8	Charlotte	United States	Spectrum Center	Wolf Alice	—	—
October 11	Chicago	United States	United Center	Wolf Alice	—	—
October 12	Chicago	United States	United Center	Wolf Alice	—	—
October 15	Boston	United States	TD Garden	Wolf Alice	40,690 / 40,690	$7,437,415
October 17	Boston	United States	TD Garden	Wolf Alice	40,690 / 40,690	$7,437,415
October 18	Boston	United States	TD Garden	Wolf Alice	40,690 / 40,690	$7,437,415
October 21	Montreal	Canada	Bell Centre	Wolf Alice	—	—
October 22	Montreal	Canada	Bell Centre	Wolf Alice	—	—
October 26	Toronto	Canada	Scotiabank Arena	Wolf Alice	—	—
October 27	Toronto	Canada	Scotiabank Arena	Wolf Alice	—	—
October 29	Columbus	United States	Schottenstein Center	Wolf Alice	—	—
October 30	Columbus	United States	Schottenstein Center	Wolf Alice	—	—
November 7	Philadelphia	United States	Xfinity Mobile Arena	Devon Again	—	—
November 8	Philadelphia	United States	Xfinity Mobile Arena	Devon Again	—	—
November 11	Atlanta	United States	State Farm Arena	Devon Again	—	—
November 12	Atlanta	United States	State Farm Arena	Devon Again	—	—
November 15	Orlando	United States	Kia Center	Devon Again	—	—
November 16	Orlando	United States	Kia Center	Devon Again	—	—
November 19	Sunrise (Note: Labeled as Miami in promotional material.)	United States	Amerant Bank Arena	Devon Again	—	—
November 20	Sunrise	United States	Amerant Bank Arena	Devon Again	—	—
November 23	Nashville	United States	Bridgestone Arena	Devon Again	—	—
November 24	Nashville	United States	Bridgestone Arena	Devon Again	—	—
December 1	Vancouver	Canada	Rogers Arena	Devon Again	—	—
December 2	Vancouver	Canada	Rogers Arena	Devon Again	—	—
December 7	Seattle	United States	Climate Pledge Arena	Devon Again	—	—
December 8	Seattle	United States	Climate Pledge Arena	Devon Again	—	—
December 11	Oakland	United States	Oakland Arena	Devon Again	—	—
December 12	Oakland	United States	Oakland Arena	Devon Again	—	—
December 15	Sacramento	United States	Golden 1 Center	Devon Again	—	—
December 16	Sacramento	United States	Golden 1 Center	Devon Again	—	—
December 19	Paradise (Note: Labeled as Las Vegas in promotional material.)	United States	T-Mobile Arena	Devon Again	—	—
December 20	Paradise	United States	T-Mobile Arena	Devon Again	—	—

List of 2027 concerts
Date (2027)	City	Country	Venue	Supporting act(s)	Attendance	Gross
January 12	Inglewood (Note: Labeled as Los Angeles in promotional material.)	United States	Intuit Dome	Devon Again; The Last Dinner Party	—	—
January 13	Inglewood	United States	Intuit Dome	Devon Again; The Last Dinner Party	—	—
January 16	Inglewood	United States	Intuit Dome	Devon Again; The Last Dinner Party	—	—
January 17	Inglewood	United States	Intuit Dome	Devon Again; The Last Dinner Party	—	—
January 20	Inglewood	United States	Intuit Dome	Devon Again; The Last Dinner Party	—	—
January 21	Inglewood	United States	Intuit Dome	Devon Again; The Last Dinner Party	—	—
January 24	Inglewood	United States	Intuit Dome	Devon Again; The Last Dinner Party	—	—
January 25	Inglewood	United States	Intuit Dome	Devon Again; The Last Dinner Party	—	—
January 28	Inglewood	United States	Intuit Dome	Devon Again; The Last Dinner Party	—	—
January 29	Inglewood	United States	Intuit Dome	Devon Again; The Last Dinner Party	—	—
February 11	New York City (Note: Labeled as Brooklyn in promotional material.)	United States	Barclays Center	Devon Again; The Last Dinner Party	—	—
February 12	New York City	United States	Barclays Center	Devon Again; The Last Dinner Party	—	—
February 15	New York City	United States	Barclays Center	Devon Again; The Last Dinner Party	—	—
February 16	New York City	United States	Barclays Center	Devon Again; The Last Dinner Party	—	—
February 19	New York City	United States	Barclays Center	Devon Again; The Last Dinner Party	—	—
February 20	New York City	United States	Barclays Center	Devon Again; The Last Dinner Party	—	—
February 23	New York City	United States	Barclays Center	Devon Again; The Last Dinner Party	—	—
February 24	New York City	United States	Barclays Center	Devon Again; The Last Dinner Party	—	—
February 27	New York City	United States	Barclays Center	Devon Again; The Last Dinner Party	—	—
February 28	New York City	United States	Barclays Center	Devon Again; The Last Dinner Party	—	—
March 19	Stockholm	Sweden	Avicii Arena	Grace Ives	—	—
March 20	Stockholm	Sweden	Avicii Arena	Grace Ives	—	—
March 23	Amsterdam	Netherlands	Ziggo Dome	Grace Ives	—	—
March 24	Amsterdam	Netherlands	Ziggo Dome	Grace Ives	—	—
March 27	Amsterdam	Netherlands	Ziggo Dome	Grace Ives	—	—
March 28	Amsterdam	Netherlands	Ziggo Dome	Grace Ives	—	—
April 1	Munich	Germany	Olympiahalle	Grace Ives	—	—
April 2	Munich	Germany	Olympiahalle	Grace Ives	—	—
April 5	London	England	The O2 Arena	Grace Ives	—	—
April 6	London	England	The O2 Arena	Grace Ives	—	—
April 8	London	England	The O2 Arena	Grace Ives	—	—
April 9	London	England	The O2 Arena	Grace Ives	—	—
April 12	London	England	The O2 Arena	Grace Ives	—	—
April 14	London	England	The O2 Arena	Die Spitz	—	—
April 15	London	England	The O2 Arena	Die Spitz	—	—
April 19	London	England	The O2 Arena	Die Spitz	—	—
April 20	London	England	The O2 Arena	Die Spitz	—	—
April 23	Nanterre (Note: Labeled as Paris in promotional material.)	France	Plenitude Arena	Die Spitz	—	—
April 24	Nanterre	France	Plenitude Arena	Die Spitz	—	—
April 27	Milan	Italy	Unipol Dome	Die Spitz	—	—
April 28	Milan	Italy	Unipol Dome	Die Spitz	—	—
May 1	Barcelona	Spain	Palau Sant Jordi	Die Spitz	—	—
May 2	Barcelona	Spain	Palau Sant Jordi	Die Spitz	—	—
May 5	Barcelona	Spain	Palau Sant Jordi	Die Spitz	—	—
May 6	Barcelona	Spain	Palau Sant Jordi	Die Spitz	—	—
May 9	London	England	The O2 Arena	Die Spitz	—	—
May 10	London	England	The O2 Arena	Die Spitz	—	—

== Personnel ==
- Olivia Rodrigo – lead vocals, guitar, piano
- Arianna Powell – guitar, backing vocals
- Camilla Charlesworth – bass, backing vocals
- Elise Solberg – keyboards, backing vocals
- Daisy Spencer – guitar, backing vocals
- Jordan Radnoti – drums, backing vocals

== See also ==
- List of Olivia Rodrigo live performances
