= What's Wrong with Me =

Song by Olivia Rodrigo and Robert Smith

from the album You Seem Pretty Sad for a Girl So in Love
- Released: June 12, 2026
- Genre: Baroque pop; synth-pop
- Length: 3:44 (original version); 3:33 (album vinyl/cassette version)
- Label: Geffen
- Songwriters: Olivia Rodrigo; Dan Nigro; Sasha Alex Sloan
- Producer: Dan Nigro

Audio video
- "What's Wrong with Me" on YouTube

"What's Wrong with Me" (stylized in all lowercase) is a song by American singer-songwriter Olivia Rodrigo and English musician Robert Smith from the former's third studio album, You Seem Pretty Sad for a Girl So in Love (2026). It has been described as a baroque pop and synth-pop song with an upbeat musical tone.

Lyrically, Rodrigo expresses concerns about a failing relationship, the consequences it had on her mental health and her struggles to maintain it. Critics noted that the song served as a thematic shift within the album as it transitions from the sensation of self-guilt in a failing relationship to blaming the relationship itself.

Rodrigo premiered it during her set at Primavera Sound on June 6, 2026. The song became available as the album's tenth track on June 12, when it was released by Geffen Records. The reception to the song has been positive; Rodrigo's duet with Smith received praise in most reviews. It received nominations for Best Rock Song and Best Rock Performance at the 69th Annual Grammy Awards.

== Background ==
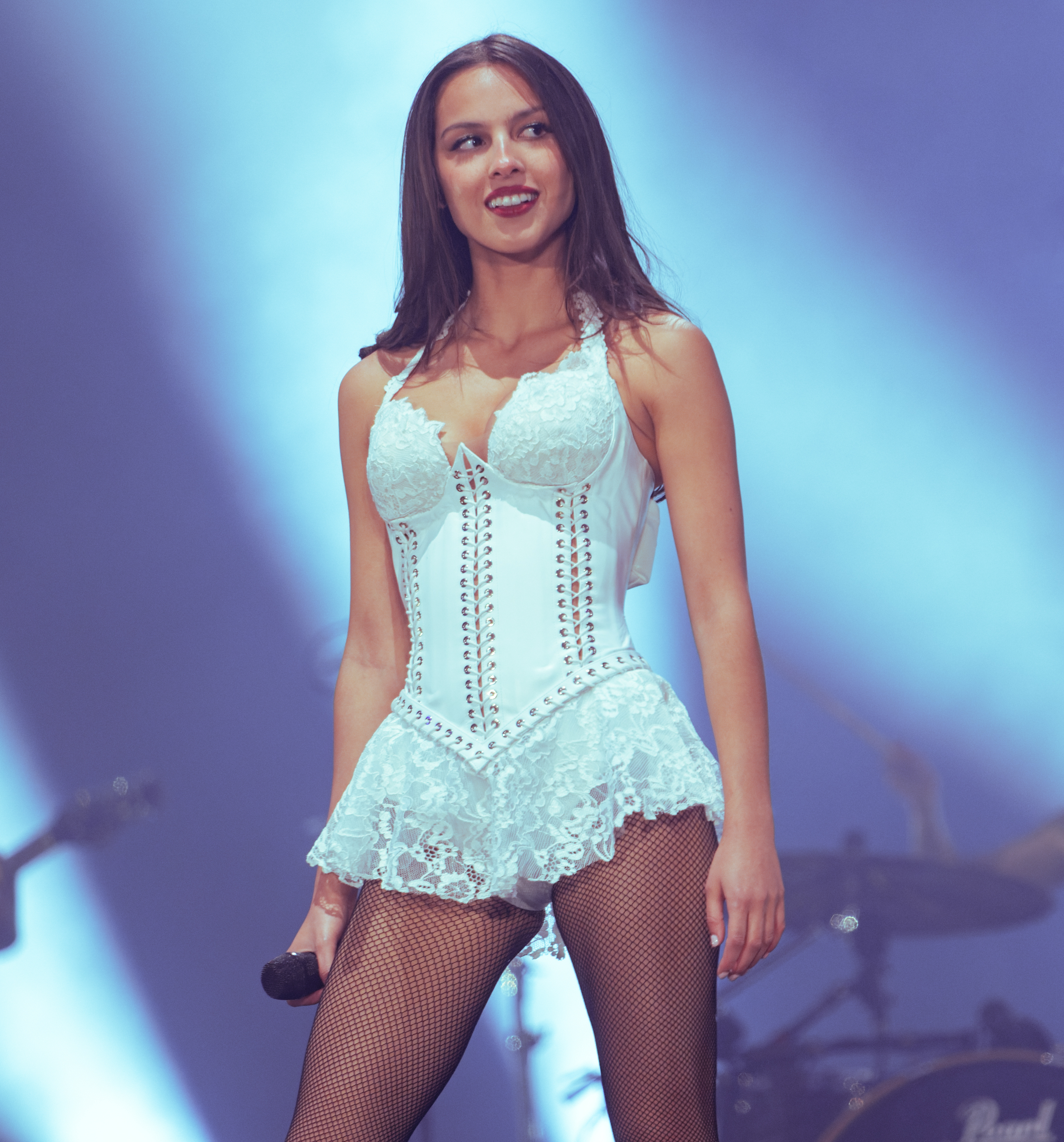
Olivia Rodrigo at Glastonbury Festival 2025

Olivia Rodrigo brought out the Cure frontman Robert Smith to perform some of the band's songs during her Glastonbury Festival set in June 2025. In March the following year, Rodrigo described the thematic direction of her third studio album in an interview with British Vogue. She stated that the album predominantly features "sad love songs", explaining that many of her favorite romantic tracks derive their appeal from an undercurrent of fear or longing.

On April 2, 2026, the album title, You Seem Pretty Sad for a Girl So in Love, was unveiled after being painted on a pink wall in Los Angeles and hinted with the final word in the album title in many cities. Rodrigo continued her collaboration with Dan Nigro, who returned to be the album's producer. Rodrigo released "Drop Dead" as the lead single on April 17; it namechecks "Just like Heaven", a single from the Cure's 1987 album Kiss Me, Kiss Me, Kiss Me. A second song from the album, called "Begged", was performed on Saturday Night Live on May 2.

Rodrigo released "The Cure" as the second single from You Seem Pretty Sad for a Girl So in Love on May 22, coinciding with World Goth Day. Billboard's Hannah Dailey interpreted the song title as a potential reference to the goth rock band, whom Rodrigo is a fan of, but Rodrigo denied that the song was related to them. The album's track list, which featured the tenth track, "What's Wrong with Me", in its You Seem Pretty Sad section, was revealed on May 26. Rodrigo premiered the song during her surprise set at Primavera Sound on June 6, unveiling it as a collaboration with Smith. It marks Rodrigo's first career collaboration for an original song.

== Composition ==
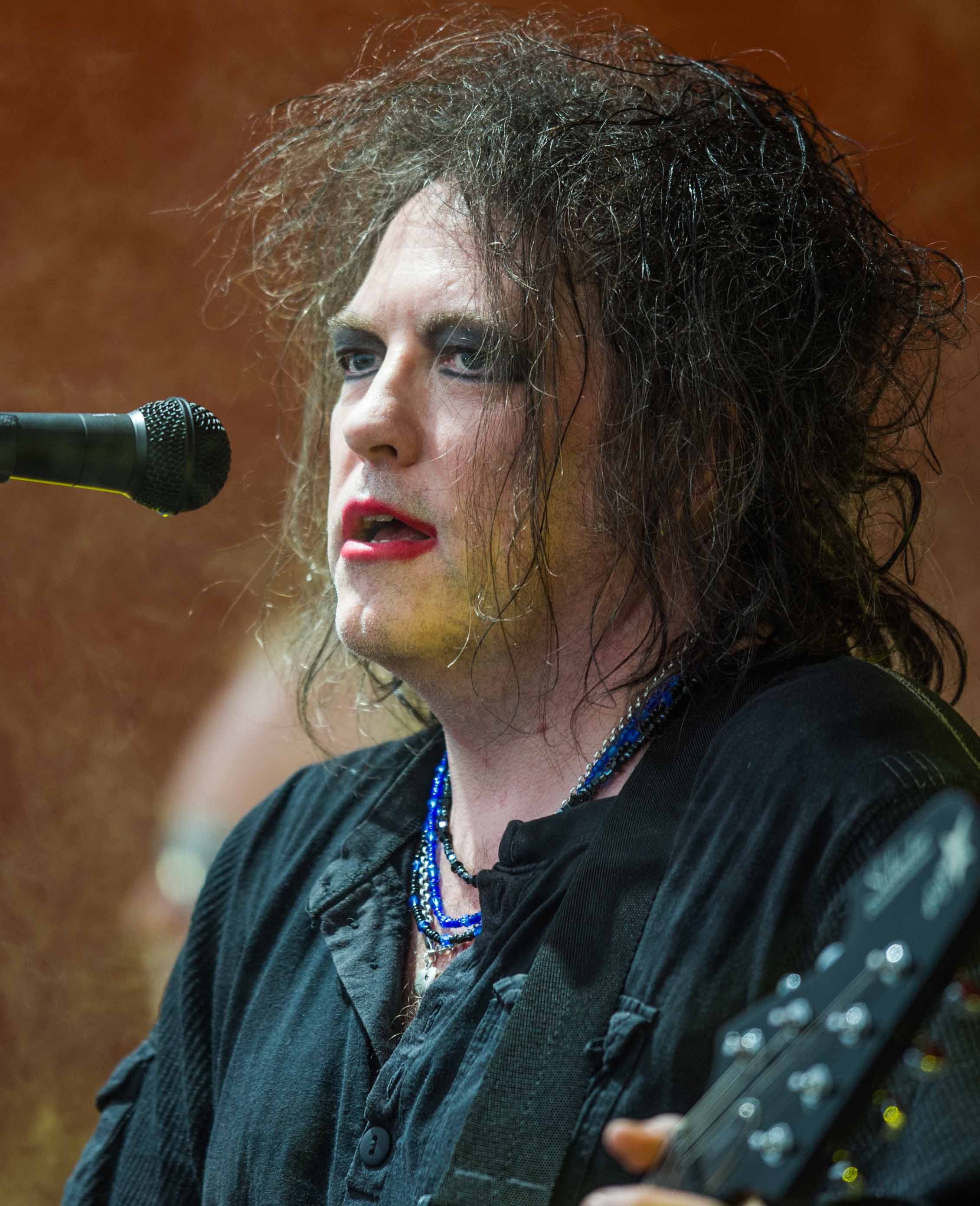
Robert Smith joined Rodrigo in performing in the song

"What's Wrong with Me" is 3 minutes and 44 seconds long. Nigro produced and programmed the song, and he engineered it with Smith. Nigro played bass, guitar, piano, and provided drum programming; and Smith played guitar, piano, and the six-string bass. Mitch McCarthy mixed the song, and Randy Merrill mastered it.

"What's Wrong with Me" is a pop, baroque pop, and synth-pop song with an upbeat musical tone. Rodrigo opens the song and it then becomes a duet between her and Smith, who joins in the second verse, featuring their layered vocals throughout its remainder. Critics observed a contrast between its buoyant production and the emotionally troubled subject matter. "What's Wrong with Me" gradually incorporates both singers into the chorus, bridge, and outro. Despite the song's introspective themes, it maintains a bright and accessible pop sound.

"What's Wrong with Me" is about the realization that one's romantic relationship is the source of their unhappiness despite their hopes for it to succeed. The song depicts the narrator experiencing emotional distress and questioning their well-being, describing symptoms such as anxiety, sleeplessness, and a loss of appetite: "My head is spinning and my stomach is sick/ Say I'm in love, so it's hard to admit/ I can't eat, I can't sleep/ I think you're what's wrong with me." In the pre-chorus and chorus, Rodrigo reflects on unsuccessful attempts to alleviate her feelings through medical advice and self-help measures. In Smith's verse, he wonders whether the partnership is truly what he wants. The lyrics portray them spiraling over a relationship that they increasingly suspect is harming rather than helping them. Rodrigo stated in an interview with the BBC that the song was about "missing someone so intensely [that] she felt listless and depressed" and changed later to better reflect the "dismal affect the relationship had on her".

Variety described the song as "very old-school synths" and the most basic of "drum-machine beats", with the melody being "sprightly enough that you could almost mistake it for a catchy love song" rather than a song that criticized one's boyfriend. Slate noted that it was a turning point in the album's narrative, where Rodrigo no longer felts guilty about her failing relationship but rather her partner.

== Critical reception ==
The reception to "What's Wrong with Me" was positive, with many praising Smith's cameo. The duet between Rodrigo and Smith was noted for the Cure's influence on the album, with Billboard calling the collaboration "ruminating".

In their review of You Seem Pretty Sad for a Girl So in Love, Pitchfork praised "What's Wrong with Me" as "practical magic" and how what at first seemed like "juvenile self-recrimination" later became a "star-crossed kiss-off". Smith's guest performance on the song was praised by Rolling Stone, which called it "a brilliant cameo" and noted that it "suit[ed] both their discographies". The Guardian called the duet a "bold move", since most of Rodrigo's fanbase are younger and might not understand Smith's work; however, they praised the song because of how Smith's "perennially racked voice blends remarkably well" with Rodrigo's. Dazed also wrote a positive review, saying that it is "powerful to hear the two meet on equal terms" while dubbing it the album's "biggest achievement" as it marked Rodrigo's ascent from "student of great singer-songwriters to one herself". Clash praised the collaboration between Rodrigo and Smith, describing it as "devastating and catchy".

NPR noted in their review of the album that "What's Wrong with Me" was a "surprisingly muted duet" and said that it was a "shame" that there was not another version of it that "might have honored Smith's talent for writing". The New York Times called the song "more effective as a cosign than a stand-alone song".

== Accolades ==
Awards and nominations
Organization	Year	Category	Result	Ref.
Grammy Awards	2027	Best Rock Song	Pending	
Grammy Awards	2027	Best Rock Performance	Pending	

== Live performances ==
Rodrigo performing "What's Wrong with Me" during the Unraveled Tour in October 2026

"What's Wrong with Me" was premiered ahead of its release when Rodrigo and Smith performed at Primavera Sound on June 6, 2026. As her first career recording to feature another artist, Rodrigo introduced the song by expressing her excitement: "I can't believe this song exists with the person that it exists with. I'm just so fucking over the moon." She did not initially reveal that the featured artist was Smith; he walked onstage partway through the performance to sing his part. As the two hugged at the end, Rodrigo said: "I feel like I'm gonna cry... I can't believe that that's a thing that happened in the real world and not just a figment of my imagination."

Following the live performance, Rolling Stone called it "heaven" and "Goth Intuition". Variety called the duet "one of pop's best-kept secrets of 2026". Billboard called the performance the "most-buzzed-about" from Primavera Sound. Rodrigo performed "What's Wrong with Me" solo during select dates of the Unraveled Tour in Charlotte, Chicago, and Philadelphia.

== Credits and personnel ==
Credits are adapted from the liner notes of You Seem Pretty Sad for a Girl So in Love.

- Dan Nigro – producer, songwriter, engineer, bass, drum programming, guitar, piano, programming, background vocals
- Olivia Rodrigo – vocals, background vocals, songwriter
- Robert Smith – vocals, background vocals, engineer, guitar, piano, six-string bass
- Sasha Alex Sloan – songwriter
- Randy Merrill – mastering
- Mitch McCarthy – mixing

== Charts ==
Chart performance
Chart (2026)	Peak position
Argentina Hot 100 (Billboard)	93
Australia (ARIA)	12
Brazil Hot 100 (Billboard)	85
Canada Hot 100 (Billboard)	18
Germany (GfK)	70
Global 200 (Billboard)	11
Greece International (IFPI)	19
New Zealand (Recorded Music NZ)	18
Panama Streaming (PRODUCE)	139
Philippines Hot 100 (Billboard Philippines)	25
Poland (Polish Streaming Top 100)	96
Portugal (AFP)	13
Singapore (RIAS)	15
Spain (Promusicae)	57
Sweden Heatseeker (Sverigetopplistan)	2
UK Streaming (OCC)	12
US Billboard Hot 100	17
US Hot Rock & Alternative Songs (Billboard)	4
