= List of songs written by Amy Allen =

=== Songwriting credits ===
List of singles, showing key details
Year	Title	Artist	Peak Chart Positions			Certifications
Year	Title	Artist	AUS	US	CAN	Certifications
2026	"Here You Come, There You Go"	Gracie Abrams	66	73	45	—
2026	"Virtuoso"	Ryan Beaty	—	—	—	—
2026	"Morals"	Suki Waterhouse	—	—	—	—
2026	"Any Man"	Suki Waterhouse	—	—	—	—
2026	"Drop Dead"	Olivia Rodrigo	1	1	1	ARIA: Platinum; BPI: Platinum; IFPI SWI: Gold; MC: 2× Platinum; RMNZ: Gold
2026	"Maggots for Brains"	Olivia Rodrigo	9	12	11	MC: Platinum; UK: Silver
2026	"Purple"	Olivia Rodrigo	19	25	27	MC: Gold
2026	"Less"	Olivia Rodrigo	15	21	20	—
2026	"Expectations"	Olivia Rodrigo	14	20	21	BPI: Silver; MC: Gold
2026	"Stupid"	Megan Moroney	—	83	—	—
2025	"So Easy (To Fall in Love)"	Olivia Dean	2	5	3	Australia (ARIA): 5x Platinum; Brazil (Pro-Música Brasil): Diamond; NZ (RMNZ): 4x Platinum; UK (BPI): 2x Platinum; US (RIAA): Platinum
2025	"First Original Thought"	Alessi Rose	—	—	—	—
2025	"Tears"	Sabrina Carpenter	3	3	4	RIAA: Gold; ARIA: Platinum; BPI: Platinum; MC: Platinum; RMNZ: Platinum
2025	"Manchild"	Sabrina Carpenter	2	1	2	RIAA: Platinum; ARIA: 2× Platinum; BPI: 2× Platinum; GLF: Gold; MC: 2× Platinum; RMNZ: Platinum
2025	"Hail Mary"	Shaboozey featuring Sierra Ferrell	—	—	—	—
2025	"Drink Up, Baby"	Carter Faith	—	—	—	—
2025	"Just Keep Watching"	Tate McRae	5	33	16	Australia (ARIA): Gold; UK (BPI): Silver
2025	"Handlebars"	Jennie and Dua Lipa	63	80	47	—
2024	"Number One Girl"	Rosé	61	—	63	Australia (ARIA): Gold
2024	"APT."	Rosé and Bruno Mars	1	3	1	US (RIAA): Platinum; Canada (Music Canada): 5× Platinum; Australia (ARIA): 8× Platinum
2024	"Cold Dark Place"	Sam Barber	—	—	—	
2024	"Thought of You"	Sam Barber	—	—	—	
2024	"Different Kind of Pain"	Sam Barber	—	—	—	
2024	"Taste"	Sabrina Carpenter	1	2	4	Australia (ARIA): 6× Platinum; Canada (Music Canada): 5× Platinum; US (RIAA): 4× Platinum; NZ (RMNZ): 3× Platinum; UK (BPI): 2× Platinum
2024	"Please Please Please"	Sabrina Carpenter	1	1	3	Canada (Music Canada): 7× Platinum; Australia (ARIA): 6× Platinum; US (RIAA): 5× Platinum; NZ (RMNZ): 4× Platinum; UK (BPI): 3× Platinum; Portugal (AFP): 2× Platinum; Brazil (Pro-Música Brasil): 2× Diamond
2024	"Espresso"	Sabrina Carpenter	1	3	4	Australia (ARIA): 10× Platinum; US (RIAA): 8× Platinum; UK (BPI): 4× Platinum; NZ (RMNZ): 5× Platinum; Canada (Music Canada): 8× Platinum; Brazil (Pro-Música Brasil): 3× Diamond
2024	"Grieved You"	Skye Riley	—	—	—	—
2024	"Selfish"	Justin Timberlake	82	19	22	Canada (Music Canada): Platinum; UK (BPI): Silver
2024	"Drown"	Justin Timberlake	—	—	—	—
2024	"High Road"	Koe Wetzel	46	22	30	Australia (ARIA): Platinum; Canada (Music Canada): Platinum; US (RIAA): 3× Platinum
2024	"Sweet Dreams"	Koe Wetzel	—	35	86	Canada (Music Canada): Gold; US (RIAA): Platinum
2024	"Caught in Your Love"	Boys World	—	—	—	—
2024	"Chrome Cowgirl"	Leon Bridges	—	—	—	—
2024	"Canopy"	Charlotte Day Wilson	—	—	—	—
2023	"Feather"	Sabrina Carpenter	23	21	25	Australia (ARIA): 4× Platinum; Canada (Music Canada): 4× Platinum; NZ (RMNZ): 2× Platinum; US (RIAA): 2× Platinum; UK (BPI): Platinum
2023	"Better Place"	NSYNC	24	25	43	Canada (Music Canada): Platinum; US (RIAA): Platinum
2023	"Greedy"	Tate McRae	2	3	1	Australia (ARIA): 6× Platinum; Canada (Music Canada):8× Platinum; Brazil (Pro-Música Brasil): 3× Diamond; US (RIAA): 5× Platinum; UK (BPI): 2× Platinum; NZ (RMNZ): 4× Platinum
2023	"Run for the Hills"	Tate McRae	54	69	34	Canada (Music Canada): 2× Platinum; NZ (RMNZ): Platinum; UK (BPI): Gold; US (RIAA): Platinum
2023	"Pretty Isn't Pretty"	Olivia Rodrigo	28	30	35	ARIA: Gold; BPI: Silver; MC: Platinum; RMNZ: Gold
2023	"Scared of My Guitar"	Olivia Rodrigo	—	90	83	MC: Gold
2023	"Save My Life"	Niall Horan	—	—	—	—
2023	"Meltdown"	Niall Horan	—	—	—	—
2023	"Strong Enough"	Jonas Brothers	—	—	—	—
2023	"Texas"	Maren Morris and Jessie Murph	—	—	—	MC: Gold
2023	"Cut Me Down"	Blu DeTiger featuring Mallrat	—	—	—	—
2023	"Cupid"	Fifty Fifty featuring Sabrina Carpenter	2	17	6	Australia (ARIA): 2× Platinum; Canada (Music Canada): 3× Platinum; UK (BPI): Platinum
2023	"Heartbroken"	Diplo	—	64	52	Australia (ARIA): Platinum; Canada (Music Canada): 2× Platinum; US (RIAA): Platinum
2023	"Forever"	Charlotte Day Wilson featuring Snoh Aalegra	—	—	—	—
2022	"Vicious"	Sabrina Carpenter	—	—	—	Australia (ARIA): Gold; Brazil (Pro-Música Brasil): Gold
2022	"Opposite"	Sabrina Carpenter	—	—	—	—
2022	"10:35"	Tiesto featuring Tate McRae	13	69	18	Australia (ARIA): Platinum; Canada (Music Canada): 5x Platinum; Denmark (IFPI Danmark): Platinum; NZ (RMNZ): 2x Platinum; UK (BPI): Platinum; US (RIAA): Platinum
2022	"For My Friends"	King Princess	—	—	—	—
2022	"My Mind & Me"	Selena Gomez	98	83	63	—
2021	"Sex & Cigarettes"	Jeremy Zucker	—	—	—	—
2021	"Wind Tempos"	Porter Robinson	—	—	—	—
2021	"Cover Me in Sunshine"	Pink	6	—	60	Australia (ARIA): 4× Platinum; Canada (Music Canada): 2× Platinum; UK (BPI): Gold
2021	"On the Ground"	Rosé	31	70	35	Brazil (Pro-Música Brasil): Platinum; NZ (RMNZ): Gold
2021	"Lifestyle"	Jason Derulo featuring Adam Levine	—	71	54	Canada (Music Canada): Platinum; Netherlands (NVPI): Gold; Poland (ZPAV): Gold
2020	"Be Kind"	Marshmello and Halsey	15	33	18	Australia (ARIA): Platinum; Canada (Music Canada): 3× Platinum; UK (BPI): Gold; US (RIAA): 2× Platinum
2020	"Forever"	Fletcher	—	—	—	—
2019	"April Showers"	Maisie Peters	—	—	—	—
2019	"Graveyard"	Halsey	24	34	38	US (RIAA): Gold; Canada (Music Canada): Gold; Australia (ARIA): Platinum
2019	"Undrunk"	Fletcher	—	61	83	US (RIAA): Gold; Canada (Music Canada): Gold
2019	"Adore You"	Harry Styles	7	6	10	Australia (ARIA): 7× Platinum; Canada (Music Canada): 6× Platinum; US (RIAA): 5× Platinum
2019	"Hallucinations"	Pvris	—	—	—	—
2019	"The First One"	Astrid S	—	—	—	—
2019	"Long Way To Go"	Four of Diamonds	—	—	—	—
2019	"Stick Around"	Rak-Su	—	—	—	—
2019	"Proud"	Aaron Carpenter	—	—	—	—
2019	"Criminal"	Grey (28)	—	—	—	—
2018	"Without Me"	Halsey	2	1	2	US (RIAA): 6× Platinum; Canada (Music Canada): 7× Platinum; Australia (ARIA): 7× Platinum
2018	"Back to You"	Selena Gomez	4	18	4	US (RIAA): 2× Platinum; Australia (ARIA): 2× Platinum
2018	"Jello"	PRETTYMUCH	—	—	—	—
2018	"Do Right"	Glades	51	—	—	Australia (ARIA): Gold
