= You Seem Pretty Sad for a Girl So in Love =

- Standard cover

Studio album by Olivia Rodrigo
- Released: June 12, 2026
- Recorded: 2024–2026
- Studio: Studio 13
- Genres: Dream pop; new wave; pop rock; synth-pop
- Length: 51:02
- Label: Geffen
- Producer: Dan Nigro

Olivia Rodrigo chronology
Live from Glastonbury (A BBC Recording) (2025)	You Seem Pretty Sad for a Girl So in Love (2026)

Singles from You Seem Pretty Sad for a Girl So in Love
- 1. "Drop Dead" Released: April 17, 2026; 2. "The Cure" Released: May 22, 2026; 3. "Stupid Song" Released: June 12, 2026; 4. "Expectations" Released: October 15, 2026

You Seem Pretty Sad for a Girl So in Love (stylized in all lowercase) is the third studio album by American singer-songwriter Olivia Rodrigo, released by Geffen Records on June 12, 2026. Primarily written by Rodrigo and its producer, Dan Nigro, it features a guest appearance by Robert Smith of the Cure.

The album's four singles—"Drop Dead", "The Cure", "Stupid Song", and "Expectations"—all achieved commercial success internationally. To promote the album, Rodrigo has embarked on the Unraveled Tour from September 2026 until May 2027.

Upon release, You Seem Pretty Sad for a Girl So in Love received widespread acclaim from music critics, who praised Rodrigo's confessional songwriting and vulnerability and deemed it a significant step-up in maturity compared to her previous works. It charted at number one in over 20 countries. At the 69th Annual Grammy Awards, it received nominations for Album of the Year and Best Pop Vocal Album.

== Background and development ==
On September 8, 2023, Olivia Rodrigo released her second album, Guts, to critical and commercial success. Produced by longtime collaborator Dan Nigro, the sonically diverse record was inspired by the period of time immediately following the release of her debut album, Sour (2021). The album received six nominations at the 66th Annual Grammy Awards, and was supported by the Guts World Tour (2024–2025). In December 2025, Rodrigo released a live album of her performance at Glastonbury Festival 2025, titled Live from Glastonbury (A BBC Recording). It features a special guest appearance by English musician Robert Smith of the Cure on recordings of the band's tracks "Friday I'm in Love" and "Just Like Heaven".

In March 2026, Rodrigo began teasing the thematic direction of her third album in an interview with British Vogue. She indicated that it would predominantly feature "sad love songs", explaining that many of her favorite romantic tracks derive their appeal from an undercurrent of fear or longing. On April 2, the title was unveiled after being painted on a pink wall in Los Angeles and hinted with its final word in several cities.

"It's scary ... to be like, 'This is what I've been going through, this is what I've been thinking about.' It's a very unique experience to be so personal on such a large scale. But I love it, I think it's the reason why I love writing songs so much is because I get to process that for myself and then therefore maybe help other people kind of process it and feel it. ... I'd be lying if I said it was like, 'Wow this feels totally normal and intuitive.' But ... music should be fun and beautiful and it should be an experience that brings people joy. Stressing too much about it doesn't really do too much."

— Rodrigo on the writing and release of the album, Apple Music

Rodrigo has described the album as covering her "first time being in an adult relationship ... [and] discovering what romantic love looks like in real time". Speaking with The New York Times, she stated that she hoped to write about "newfound contentment in a way that wasn't dull" and that "[it] was a daunting task". Rodrigo wanted to prove to herself that she "didn't have to be miserable to write a song she liked". Halfway through the writing process, she went back to make some of the songs she had already written a "little more sad and creepy".

You Seem Pretty Sad for a Girl So in Love continues Rodrigo's collaboration with Nigro, who returns as producer. Taking inspiration from her time in London, she dubbed it her "most experimental" yet. The tenth track, "What's Wrong with Me", features a guest appearance by Smith and marks Rodrigo's first career collaboration for an original song. Rodrigo also wrote six additional songs that were considered for the final track list, including "Serena Joy", a pop and post-punk track. Titled after the character Serena Joy from the 1985 novel The Handmaid's Tale, it was released as a non-album single in August, first as a CD and later as a single digitally.

Rodrigo was inspired to write "Stupid Song" after reading Annie Ernaux's 1992 novel Simple Passion, in which the protagonist has an affair with someone but does not feel truly happy and is instead overcome by longing and obsession. She wanted to capture how "love makes you insane and miserable" and uncover the depressing feelings someone experiences while in a romantic relationship. Speaking of the album's conception and the influence of Sex and the City (1998–2004) on the tracks, Rodrigo stated: "Like, when Miranda and Steve are getting back together, she's crying. 'Steve, anytime something funny happens, I just want to tell you.' And I remember watching that and being like, 'Oh, my God, I have to write a song about this.'"

== Composition ==
=== Music ===
You Seem Pretty Sad for a Girl So in Love has been described as a pop, indie, dream pop, new wave, pop rock, and shimmering synth-pop record influenced by shoegaze. Its songs shift between indie pop, emotional ballads, fuzzy alternative rock, minimalist pop, post-punk, and folk rock sonics. It has also been likened to 1980s alternative and described as incorporating elements of New Romantic-era rock and college rock; Stereogum's Tom Breihan stated that it "calls back to the college rock of the late [19]80s", and Jason P. Frank of Vulture characterized it as "essentially, a rock opera". Rodrigo explores goth rock, jangle pop, folk, string quartets, ethereal layered harmonies, and dance-punk. Several critics noted the change in sound from her previous albums, Sour and Guts. (Note: Critics such as Beats Per Minute's John Wohlmacher, the Duke Chronicle's Evan Poradzisz, NPR Music's Hazel Cills, and the staff writers of New Noise Magazine and Atwood Magazine.) Danette Chavez of The A.V. Club wrote that the album "mark[ed] her shift from young adult to new adult". P. Claire Dodson of Teen Vogue described the album as "cohesive, conceptual, and just alternative enough to stand out in a pop landscape that has grown more crowded, and more country-influenced" than her previous record Guts.

The album is split into two sections; Girl So in Love, encompassing the first seven tracks, contains more synth-pop and indie pop elements in "Drop Dead", "Stupid Song", and "Maggots for Brains". It has fast tempo songs such as "My Way" being compared to tracks from her previous record, Guts. It also incorporates violin and viola by Paul Cartwright in "Drop Dead", acoustic pop piano ballads on "Honeybee", and synthesizers on "Maggots for Brains". Comprising the remaining six tracks, You Seem Pretty Sad explores downtempo, pop, rock, and ballads such as "Begged", "What's Wrong with Me", and "Less".

=== Lyrical themes ===
Lyrically, You Seem Pretty Sad for a Girl So in Love examines the chronology of a relationship. It first showcases the happiness found within a new romance; however, as it progresses, Rodrigo begins to lose hope in it. Kofi Mframa of USA Today labeled Rodrigo's songwriting on the album "less disillusioned, more grounded, yet just as vulnerable" as her previous records. NPR Music's Hazel Cills considered its themes "less angsty" than Guts and wrote that it "pushes [Rodrigo's] songwriting closer to mainstream ideals, ... embrac[ing] a cohesive narrative of a relationship".

The "melodramatic" Girl So in Love section discusses romantic devotion, including envisioning a lasting future with a partner ("U + Me = <3") and a feeling of lovesickness without them ("Maggots for Brains"). Nitika Francis of The Hindu described the songs of the section as having a "shiny quality". In "Stupid Song", Rodrigo imagines conversations with her partner and admits to constantly thinking about what he might say to her and portrays her emotions as increasingly uncontrollable, likening herself to a "car speeding down the boulevard without a brake" and declaring that she wants the person "more than any stupid song could ever say".

As the relationship gradually ends in the You Seem Pretty Sad section, the tone shifts to what Cills describes as "a dark malaise". It describes feelings of yearning ("Begged") and emotional distress, describing symptoms such as anxiety, sleeplessness, and a loss of appetite ("What's Wrong with Me"). In "The Cure", which depicts doubt, mistrust, and misplaced faith, Rodrigo describes a relationship she initially viewed as an "antidote" and uses medicinal imagery to portray love as an ineffective remedy for her emotional struggles.

=== Songs ===
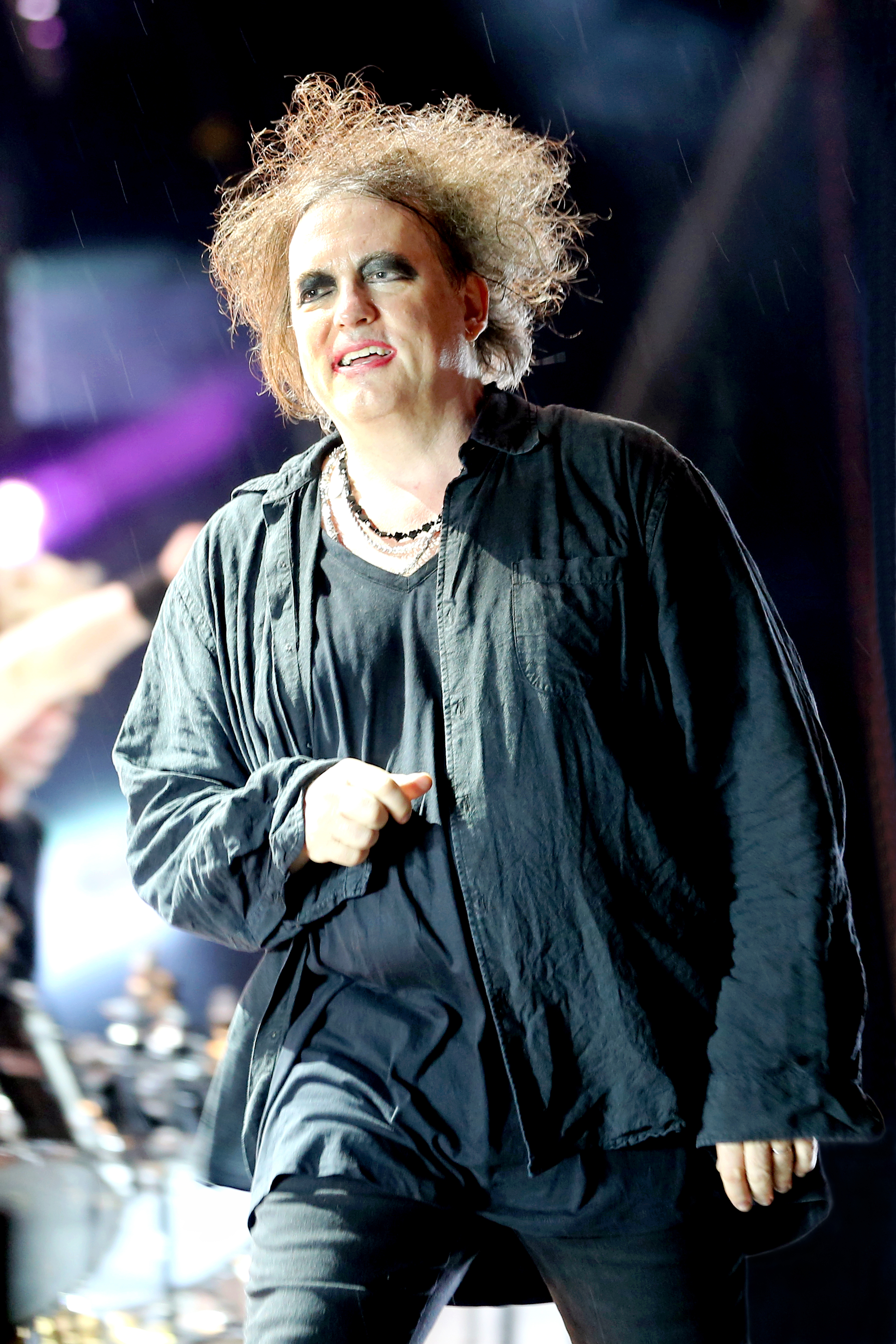
The album features a guest appearance from Robert Smith on the track "What's Wrong with Me".

You Seem Pretty Sad for a Girl So in Love opens with the lead single, "Drop Dead", which has been mainly described as a synth-pop, chamber pop, indie pop, pop rock, and trippy soft rock song with a rock bridge and a power pop guitar solo. A snippet featured "a mix of fluttery, percussive synths" according to Billboard's Hannah Dailey. Joel Calfee of Harper's Bazaar called it a "pulsing, synth-heavy track that strays from the more rock-leaning music of [Rodrigo's] past". Lyrically, it has been described as singing about the start of a romance. Rodrigo referenced the Cure's 1987 single "Just Like Heaven" by including the lyric "You know all the words to 'Just Like Heaven'", which previously appeared on the cover of Live from Glastonbury (A BBC Recording). The next track, "Stupid Song", is an indie pop, pop rock, and synth-rock song that, much like "Drop Dead", has been lyrically described as hinting at an early relationship. In a Pitchfork interview, Rodrigo explained that she wrote the song on her piano in New York after an early morning walk, drawing on inspiration from the feeling of infatuation. She later developed its production with Dan Nigro, adding dance drums to the piano-based song.

"Honeybee" is an acoustic pop piano ballad, along with a choir in the outro. The lyrics revolve around an uncertain relationship, with Rodrigo comparing her lover to a honey bee, as she fears he will abruptly end it while hoping they will stay. She evokes romantic imagery, including shooting stars, racing cars, and "sticky sweet tangerine". It also features backing vocals from Rodrigo's friend Conan Gray and has lyrics about the love for her then-partner and her hope for their future together. "Maggots for Brains" is a jangle pop, new wave, and post-punk tune featuring synthesizers new wave tones, and production reminiscent of the English bands New Order and the Cure, British band Siouxsie and the Banshees, and Canadian pop band Alvvays. It is said to reference the relationship of Sex and the City characters Miranda Hobbes and Steve Brady and has been described as having an "intriguing title", being titled after the English idiom "worms for brains". "U + Me = <3" is an indie rock track that talks about "[a] boy with 'floppy hair' who takes her out to dinner". "My Way" sees Rodrigo address another woman who is trying to pursue her boyfriend. The seventh track, "Purple", closes out the Girl So in Love section; a ballad originally written as a "sweet and saccharine" love song, it was later changed to have a darker theme.

The You Seem Pretty Sad section begins with the second single, "The Cure", a downtempo, rock, indie rock, and pop track that critics have described as a "crowning achievement" and a "mature step forward" for Rodrigo. Variety's Chris Willman compared its somber atmosphere and restrained buildup to 1990s alternative rock, including the music of the Smashing Pumpkins and Foo Fighters. Although "The Cure" incorporates elements of Rodrigo's earlier rock-oriented work, it relies less heavily on electric guitars. "Begged", a folk and acoustic pop ballad, explores themes of yearning and uncertainty. "What's Wrong with Me" with Robert Smith is a baroque pop song about the realization that one's romantic relationship is the source of their unhappiness, despite their hopes for it to succeed. Carl Wilson of Slate opined that it was a turning point in the narrative, where Rodrigo no longer feels guilty about her failing relationship but rather her partner. It is followed by "Less", which has been speculated to have lyrics related to a "devastating breakup". The penultimate track, "Expectations", is a synth-pop and electropop song described to have lyrics that suggest "new standards for dating" followed by the singer. Breihan labeled it a "pulsing new wave rager that's incandescent in its bitterness", with an "electro-pop bassline [that] evokes Devo and the Human League". Bustle's Jake Viswanath stated that Rodrigo "gets dancier than ever before ... over groovy synths and [19]80s guitars". The closer, "Cigarette Smoke", contains lyrics that seem to be about a brutal response after a breakup. Rodrigo said that the song began when Dan Nigro played guitar cords in the studio, promoting them to stop working on another track and begin writing it. It became the last song written for the album and its closing track.

== Release and promotion ==
=== Artwork and aesthetics ===
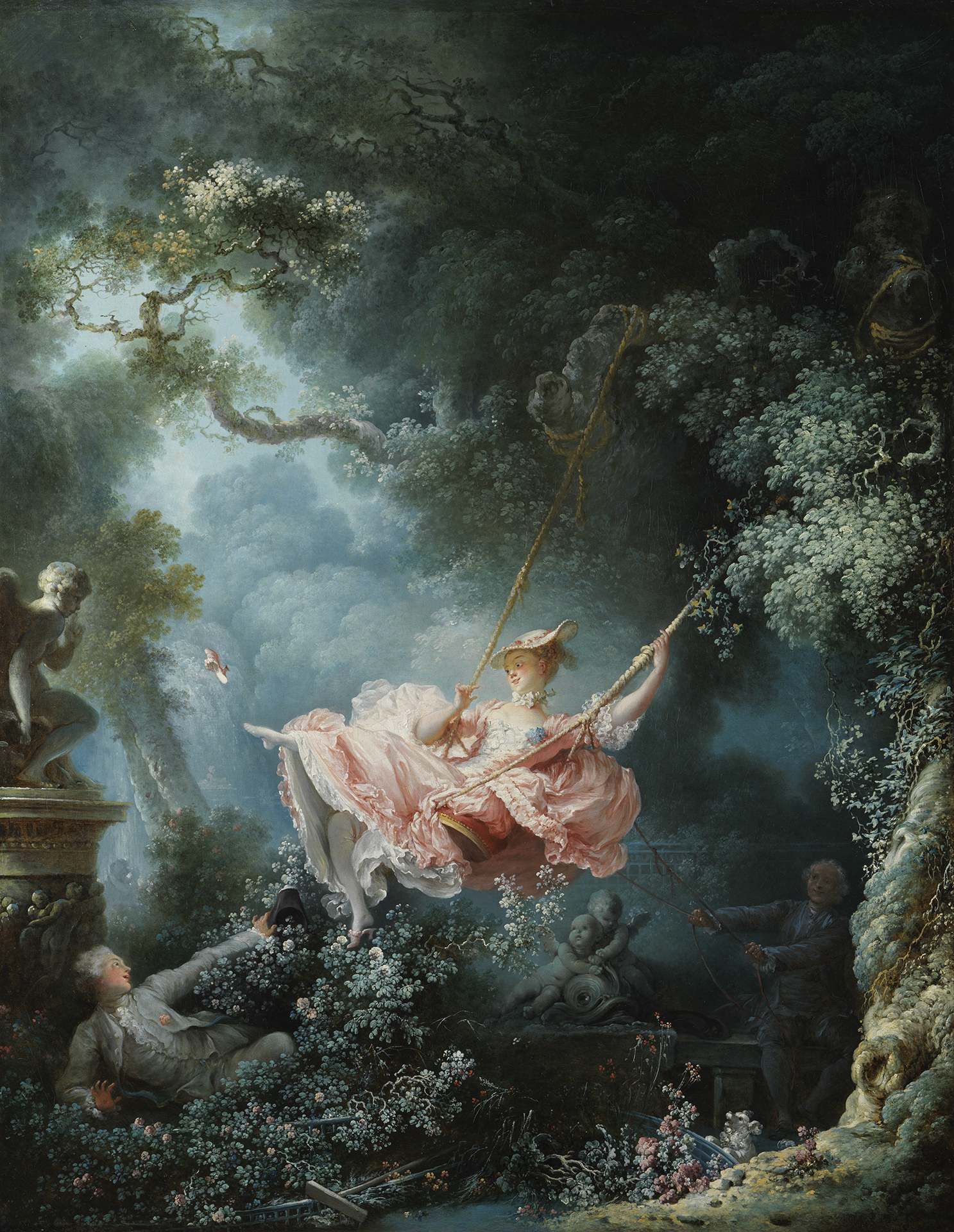
The standard cover has been compared to The Swing, an 18th century painting by Jean-Honoré Fragonard.

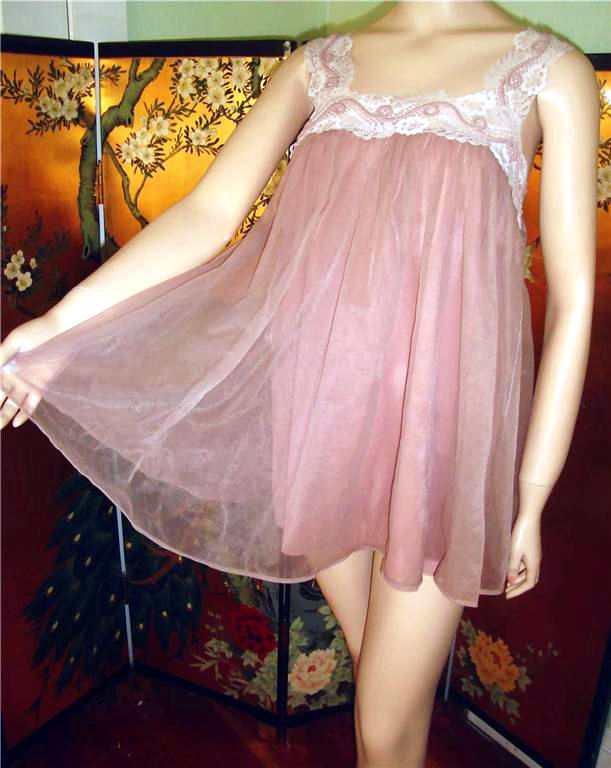
The promotional visuals feature a pink babydoll dress.

The standard cover artwork shows Rodrigo upside down on a swing against a soft pink-and-blue sky, wearing a pink babydoll dress, white crew socks, and Mary Jane shoes. It has been compared to Jean-Honoré Fragonard's Rococo painting The Swing, which similarly depicts a woman on a swing in a pink dress. Rodrigo's official web-store edition, also known as the "Carve Our Names" picture disc vinyl, features an original oil painting by Chloe Wise based on a photograph by Chad Moore.

The album's promotional material, including the artwork, features shades of blue and light pink. For the promotional cycle, Rodrigo mostly appeared in babydoll dresses, for which she was later criticized for "infantili[z]ing herself" and evoking the "sexy baby" aesthetic; Rodrigo called the response "disturbing" and said "it's just this rhetoric that we're fed as girls ... 'Don't wear that, because then a man is going to sexualize your body, and it's your fault.' It's so weird." Rodrigo's wardrobe for the music video for "Drop Dead" includes a vintage Simone Baron minidress worn by Jane Birkin in the 1975 film Catherine & Co. Vogue also described "the images of Rodrigo, running around in retro pink over-ear headphones and glued to her laptop in bed" as "[a] call back to the girlish, modern, and sometimes anachronistic motifs of Sofia Coppola's Marie Antoinette". The album's title having ten words, was conceived during a conversation between Rodrigo and her producer Dan Nigro, who had suggested the title. Walden Green of Pitchfork described the title, You Seem Pretty Sad for a Girl So in Love, as "befitting the tangled, thorny predicament of experiencing real romantic love for the first time".

=== Distribution and singles ===
Preorders for Target-exclusive vinyl editions of You Seem Pretty Sad for a Girl So in Love began on April 6, 2026, available in a "Pretty Sad" pink color and a "Hope Like Snow" white color. Revealed on May 26, the track listing is stylistically divided into two parts: Girl So in Love and You Seem Pretty Sad. The album was released on June 12, 2026, in cassette, CD, digital download, streaming, and LP formats. On June 14, a digital edition was released with "Never Do" as a bonus track. A limted Japanese edition of the album, subtitled the Deluxe edition comes in a 12-inch-size cardboard sleeve. It also includes the Japanese translations of the lyrics, a lyric book and a translated message, a 20-page photobook , a set of five flake stickers and a clear art card.

Four singles were released from the album. The first three topped the charts in Australia, and Ireland. On April 7, 2026, Rodrigo announced the lead single, "Drop Dead", which was released on April 17. Its accompanying music video was primarily shot at the Palace of Versailles and directed by Petra Collins. The single debuted at number one on the US Billboard Hot 100, extending her record as the first artist to debut the lead singles from their first three albums at the top of the chart. The single also reached number one in Canada, and the United Kingdom, and also reached the top five in many charts. (Note: References:) On May 19, "The Cure" was announced as the second single and was released on May 22. It also reached number one in Singapore, number five in the US, and it also entered the top ten of the national charts. (Note: References:) The single also debuted and spent two weeks atop the US Hot Rock and Alternative Songs chart. Physical editions of the single feature the bonus track "Never Do". A music video for the third single, "Stupid Song", shot primarily in New York City, was released the same day as the album. It debuted at number three on the Billboard Hot 100 and topped the charts in and New Zealand, and also entered into the top five of many of other charts. (Note: References:) She shot the music video under the code name "dumb tune" to prevent leaking of the video. It was sent to radio stations on July 13. A remix of "Expectations", featuring Chappell Roan, was released on October 15 as the album's fourth single. The song entered the top ten in many countries including number three in the US and the UK. (Note: References:) The release and distribution date near June 12, 2026, is symbolic as it was simultaneously Philippine Independence Day who she has descent from, with her Filipino father, as well as the Feast of the Sacred Heart. On the same day a rare double rainbow appeared in Washington D.C.

=== Marketing and tour ===
A wall in Los Angeles, nicknamed the "Olivia Rodrigo wall", was painted pink after speculation of a new album, with the word "love" appearing. This marked a transition from her signature purple color to pink. Rodrigo's website also transitioned to pink. Rodrigo announced the album on April 2, 2026. Beginning the promotional cycle, Rodrigo's team placed pink padlocks in cities like Los Angeles, Paris, and London to hint to the lead single, "Drop Dead". These padlocks come together to form the words "April 17th drop dead". She then posted snippets to her social media accounts which contained pink-colored text of lyrics rather than vocals.

Rodrigo performing in Chicago during the Unraveled Tour in October 2026

A promotional "Walk in the Park" limited-edition 7-inch vinyl for the tracks "Honeybee" and "Cigarette Smoke" was released. Merchandise was also released. On April 18, Rodrigo debuted "Drop Dead" live during a surprise appearance at Addison Rae's set at Coachella 2026. She premiered "Begged" during her appearance on Saturday Night Live on May 2, and sang "Drop Dead" for Spotify's Billions Club Live concert series later that month. In June, she performed "The Cure" and a cover of CMAT's "When a Good Man Cries" at the BBC Radio Live Lounge; premiered "What's Wrong with Me" with Smith during a surprise set at Primavera Sound; and sang "The Cure" and "Stupid Song" on Jimmy Kimmel Live! She hosted a one-hour special at iHeartRadio's Los Angeles studio titled "u+me=advice forever", which revolved around relationship advice. To promote and discuss the album, Rodrigo appeared on the covers of British Vogue, Cosmopolitan, Hits, and Dazed; and gave interviews for The Tonight Show Starring Jimmy Fallon, The New York Times's Popcast podcast, YouTube, BBC News, Capital's official YouTube channel and "Capital Buzz", SiriusXM, and Zane Lowe on Apple Music.

Rodrigo performed an invite-only one-off concert, billed as One Night Only, at the Echo in Los Angeles on April 24, 2026. A second One Night Only concert took place on August 6 at Warsaw in Brooklyn, New York. Announced that same day at 10 a.m. local time, all tickets were priced at $25 and were available exclusively at Warsaw's box office; the venue announced via social media at approximately 12 p.m. that tickets had sold out. (Note: Attributed to The Guardian, The Brooklyn Paper, Stereogum, PIX 11, and NME.)

On April 30, 2026, Rodrigo announced her third concert tour, the Unraveled Tour. Consisting of 86 dates across North America and Europe, it commenced on September 25, 2026, in Hartford, United States, and is set to conclude on May 10, 2027, in London, England. Supporting acts include Devon Again, Die Spitz, Grace Ives, the Last Dinner Party, and Wolf Alice.

== Critical reception ==
=== Reviews ===
Professional ratings
Aggregate scores
Source	Rating
AnyDecentMusic?	8.5/10
Metacritic	87/100
Review scores
Source	Rating
AllMusic	4.5/5 stars
Clash	9/10
The Daily Telegraph	4/5 stars
DIY	5/5 stars
The Guardian	4/5 stars
The Independent	5/5 stars
The Irish Times	5/5 stars
NME	4.5/5 stars
Pitchfork	8.3/10
Rolling Stone	4.5/5 stars

You Seem Pretty Sad for a Girl So in Love received universal acclaim from music critics. According to the review aggregator Metacritic, You Seem Pretty Sad for a Girl So in Love received "universal acclaim" based on a weighted average score of 87 out of 100 from 26 critic scores. The review aggregator site AnyDecentMusic? compiled 26 reviews and gave the album a weighted average score of 8.5 out of 10, based on their assessment of the critical consensus.

Pitchfork's Molly Mary O'Brien viewed You Seem Pretty Sad for a Girl So in Love as Rodrigo's "most sophisticated" release yet, noting that she "has never sounded more adventurous" and was "somehow running the gamut from Gary Numan to R.E.M. without sounding like pastiche at any point". O'Brien praised Rodrigo's evolution as a songwriter, deeming it "a sight to behold" and further noting: "Emotional transmission has always been a big tenet of the Olivia Rodrigo experience—she needs us to feel everything as intensely as she does, and will use every musical trick in the book to make it happen." Sputnikmusic's Caleb Robinson praised Rodrigo's songwriting talent for reaching "a level of perfection and depth rarely achieved by her pop contemporaries". The album also received praise from Billboard and was rated four out of five stars by The Daily Telegraph and The Sydney Morning Herald.

Rolling Stone's Julyssa Lopez believed that Rodrigo's storytelling had matured on You Seem Pretty Sad for a Girl So in Love, which she described as her "most complete, musically adventurous album yet". Emma Constance from Clash described Rodrigo's songwriting as diaristic, capturing the rise and fall of a romantic relationship with unfiltered honesty. Constance praised tracks such as "Drop Dead", "Stupid Song", and "Honeybee" for their euphoric depictions of infatuation, while highlighting "The Cure", "Begged", and "What's Wrong with Me" as devastating-yet-catchy explorations of heartbreak. Constance concluded that Rodrigo had "successfully transformed another turbulent part of her life into something beautiful and unskippable". NPR Music's Hazel Cills had a more mixed review, criticizing the "melodramatic" and "repetitive" tone of the first half and noting that "Rodrigo doesn't step back quite far enough to truly make sense of what this relationship has done to her". However, Cills praised "The Cure" as "one of the strongest [tracks] of Rodrigo's career so far".

The Daily Texan said that "Rodrigo stayed true to the album title, touching fans with relatable songs about difficult relationships that are both happy and sad."

=== Lists ===
You Seem Pretty Sad for a Girl So in Love appeared on multiple publications' lists of the best albums from roughly the first half of 2026, published in June and July. These lists were largely unranked, although Tom Dunne of the Irish Examiner placed it at number seven in his top ten, and staff and contributors from The Quietus voted it number 79 out of 100 on their list. Furthermore, it was included in other mid-year lists published by BrooklynVegan, Elle, Flood Magazine, Manila Bulletin, NME, Our Culture Mag, Rolling Stone, Slant Magazine, and Variety.

== Commercial performance ==
Upon release, You Seem Pretty Sad for a Girl So in Love became 2026's most-streamed album by a female artist within a single day on Spotify and obtained the largest global streaming debut of the year on Amazon Music. By October 2026, it surpassed three billion streams on Spotify and ranked as the platform's second-most-streamed album of the year.

According to Luminate figures reported by Billboard, the album earned 485,000 album-equivalent units in the United States in its first week, comprising 273,000 pure album sales (including 164,000 vinyl LPs), 211,000 streaming-equivalent albums (from 218.41 million on-demand audio streams), and 1,000 track-equivalent albums. It debuted atop the Billboard 200, Top Album Sales, Top Streaming Albums, and Top Rock & Alternative Albums charts. It marked Rodrigo's third consecutive US number-one album and made her the first act in Billboard chart history to have their first three lead singles and studio albums debut atop the Billboard Hot 100 and Billboard 200. It was the largest weekly overall debut and the largest streaming opening for any album by a female act released in 2026. After spending its first two weeks atop the Billboard 200, the album returned to the top spot in October and did not leave the top five within the first four months of release. It has spent a total of five weeks atop the chart so far, tying Sour as Rodrigo's longest-charting album in the US. The tracks "Stupid Song" and "Honeybee" entered the Billboard Hot 100 at numbers three and nine, respectively. With this, Rodrigo became the first woman to debut her first ten top-ten singles in the top ten. Following this, it earned 207,000 album-equivalent units. "Expectations" peaked at number three following its remix featuring Roan in October, making You Seem Pretty Sad for a Girl So in Love Rodrigo's album with the most top-ten entries on the chart, with five.

In the United Kingdom, You Seem Pretty Sad for a Girl So in Love debuted atop the UK Albums Chart with 102,814 album-equivalent units in its first week (comprising 27,194 CD sales, 25,562 vinyl LP sales, 9,212 cassette sales, 1,443 digital downloads, and 39,403 streaming-equivalent albums), becoming Rodrigo's biggest opening week and her third consecutive UK number-one album. At age 23, Rodrigo became the youngest international artist to surpass 100,000 opening-week album-equivalent units in the UK in over two decades, since Britney Spears's Greatest Hits: My Prerogative in 2004. It also achieved 2026's biggest opening week for a non-British release in the UK up to that point. It remained atop the chart in its second week. Furthermore, she obtained placements for the top three positions on the UK singles chart, with "Drop Dead" at number one and both "The Cure" and "Stupid Song" peaking at number two.

The album also debuted atop the Canadian albums chart, with all 13 tracks entering the Canadian Hot 100, led by "Stupid Song". It spent three consecutive weeks atop the chart, remaining at its number-one position in its second and third week in the country. The lead single, "Drop Dead", topped the Canadian Hot 100. Three singles, "Drop Dead", "The Cure", and "Stupid Song" were certified double platinum in the country. In Australia, the album spent five weeks atop the album chart, with all three singles reaching number one on the singles chart in the country. It returned to its first position on the chart on two more instances; July 20, 2026, and August 17, 2026, bringing its total weeks at number one in the country to five weeks. It also spent five consecutive weeks atop the album chart in New Zealand.

You Seem Pretty Sad for a Girl So in Love also reached number one in Austria, Belgian Flanders and Wallonia, Denmark, France, Ireland, Spain, Sweden, and Switzerland. It topped both the Top 100 albums and Top 100 Pop albums chart in Germany. It also topped the German Vinyl Album chart. It became Rodrigo's first chart-topper in France, spending two consecutive weeks atop the album chart and selling 14,211 physical copies in the country (which accounted for around 71% of its sales), being bolstered by limited edition CD and vinyl copies. It thus became her highest sales week in the country. The album was certified gold in Belgium, France, and Poland; platinum in New Zealand Spain, and the United Kingdom; and double platinum in Canada.

== Accolades ==
Awards and nominations
Organization	Year	Category	Result	Ref.
ARIA Music Awards	2026	Most Popular International Artist (Note: Despite the category's name, each nominee was nominated alongside their album.)	Nominated	
Los 40 Music Awards	2026	Best International Album	Nominated	
MTV Video Music Awards	2026	Best Album	Nominated	
Nickelodeon Kids' Choice Awards	2026	Favorite Album	Nominated	
Grammy Awards	2027	Album of the Year	Pending	
Grammy Awards	2027	Best Pop Vocal Album	Pending	

== Impact and commentary ==
English singer-songwriter Sienna Spiro and American singer-songwriter Role Model covered the tracks "Less" and "Maggots for Brains", respectively, in the BBC Radio Live Lounge. An exhibit giving fans a behind-the-scenes look at the music video of "The Cure" opened at the Grammy Museum in Los Angeles in September 2026 and is expected to run through February 2027.

In his review of You Seem Pretty Sad for a Girl So in Love for Variety, Chris Willman wrote that Rodrigo was "constitutionally incapable of not turning in one of the year's most diverting albums". The Los Angeles Times writer Mikael Wood said "Rodrigo proved herself to be perhaps the most gifted of the many chroniclers of Gen Z romance to emerge in Taylor Swift's wake." Robinson commented that "You Seem Pretty Sad ... will go down as one of the decade's finest albums, and it sits comfortably among the ranks of other modern pop classics", and Nathan Chizen of CBC News dubbed it "the Album of the Summer". Clash's Robin Murray wrote that "The Cure" "further underlines Olivia Rodrigo's place as one of this generation's defining icons".

Some publications noticed how the album also highlighted some of societal issues. Jezebel talked about how Rodrigo used a lyric in the track "Expectations" to "spread awareness about unemployment". Many outlets and publications credited Rodrigo for reviving the babydoll dress. (Note: As per Vogue 's Anna Caloffa, Who What Wear 's Ava Gilchrist, CBC News's Brittany Spanos, and Marie Claire.) Marie Claire called it the 'trend of the summer'.

== Track listing ==
All tracks are written by Olivia Rodrigo, additional writers were noted.

You Seem Pretty Sad for a Girl So in Love track listing
No.	Title	Writer(s)	Length
1.	"Drop Dead"	Amy Allen; Daniel Nigro	3:44
2.	"Stupid Song"	Nigro	3:29
3.	"Honeybee"		3:43
4.	"Maggots for Brains"	Allen; Nigro	4:00
5.	"U + Me = <3"	Nigro	4:07
6.	"My Way"	Nigro; Steph Jones	3:00
7.	"Purple"	Allen; Nigro	4:00
8.	"The Cure"	Nigro	4:57
9.	"Begged"		3:37
10.	"What's Wrong with Me" (with Robert Smith)	Nigro; Sasha Alex Sloan	3:44
11.	"Less"	Allen; Nigro	3:13
12.	"Expectations"	Allen; Nigro	3:41
13.	"Cigarette Smoke"	Nigro	5:40
Total length:			51:02

You Seem Pretty Sad for a Girl So in Love (With a Bonus Track)
No.	Title	Length
14.	"Never Do"	3:43
Total length:		54:45

=== Notes ===
- All track titles are stylized in all lowercase.
- Stylistically, tracks 1–7 are grouped under Girl So in Love while tracks 8–13 are grouped under You Seem Pretty Sad.
- Physical editions of the album have a total runtime of 48:31; tracks 3, 4, 5, 8, 10, and 13 feature shorter runtimes than their streaming counterparts.

== Personnel ==
These credits were adapted from Tidal.

=== Musicians ===
- Olivia Rodrigo – vocals
- Daniel Nigro – background vocals, bass, drum programming, guitar, string arrangement, Mellotron, piano, percussion, programming, acoustic guitar, Moog bass, electric guitar, organ (tracks 1–10, 12, 13); production, engineering (all tracks); mixing (3, 9, 11, 13); vocal production (8)
- Sterling Laws – drums (tracks 1, 2, 4–6, 8, 12)
- Paul Cartwright – violin, viola (tracks 1–3, 8, 13); string arrangement (tracks 1, 3, 8, 13); cello (track 8)
- Noah Conrad – piano (tracks 2, 3, 11); co-production (track 11)
- Bryn Bliska – programming (tracks 2, 5); synthesizer (track 8)
- Conan Gray – background vocals (track 3)
- Lily Elise – background vocals (tracks 3, 4)
- Arianna Powell – guitar (track 3)
- Ben Romans – piano (tracks 4, 5)
- Sam Stewart – guitar (track 5)
- Ryan Linvill – flute (track 7); saxophone (track 9)
- Jim-E Stack – drum programming, guitar, piano, programming, co-production, engineering (track 7)
- Amy Allen – background vocals (track 7)
- Robert Smith – vocals, background vocals, bass, guitar, piano, engineering (track 10)
- Mike Wise – guitar, programming, co-production, engineering (track 12)

=== Technical ===
- Neal Pogue – mixing (track 1)
- Mitch McCarthy – mixing (tracks 2, 4–8, 10, 12)
- Zachary Acosta – additional mixing (track 1)
- Mike Bozzi – mastering (tracks 1, 2, 5, 8)
- Jack Doutt – mastering (tracks 2, 5)
- Randy Merrill – mastering (tracks 3, 4, 6, 7, 9–13)
- Chris Kasych – engineering (tracks 2, 4, 6, 11)
- Michael Harris – additional engineering (track 5)

== Charts ==
=== Weekly charts ===
Weekly chart performance
Chart (2026)	Peak position
Argentine Albums (CAPIF)	1
Australian Albums (ARIA)	1
Austrian Albums (Ö3 Austria)	1
Belgian Albums (Ultratop Flanders)	1
Belgian Albums (Ultratop Wallonia)	1
Canadian Albums (Billboard)	1
Croatian International Albums (HDU)	1
Czech Albums (ČNS IFPI)	4
Danish Albums (Hitlisten)	1
Dutch Albums (Album Top 100)	1
Finnish Albums (Suomen virallinen lista)	1
French Albums (SNEP)	1
German Albums (Offizielle Top 100)	1
German Pop Albums (Offizielle Top 100)	1
Greek Albums (IFPI)	1
Hungarian Albums (MAHASZ)	1
Irish Albums (Official Charts)	1
Italian Albums (FIMI)	1
Japanese Albums (Oricon)	21
Japanese Combined Albums (Oricon)	36
Japanese Hot Albums (Billboard Japan)	8
Lithuanian Albums (AGATA)	2
New Zealand Albums (RMNZ)	1
Norwegian Albums (IFPI Norge)	2
Polish Albums (ZPAV)	2
Portuguese Albums (AFP)	1
Scottish Albums (Official Charts)	1
Slovak Albums (ČNS IFPI)	2
Spanish Albums (Promusicae)	1
Swedish Albums (Sverigetopplistan)	1
Swiss Albums (Schweizer Hitparade)	1
UK Albums (Official Charts)	1
US Billboard 200	1
US Top Rock & Alternative Albums (Billboard)	1

=== Monthly charts ===
Monthly chart performance
Chart (2026)	Peak position
Croatian International Vinyl Albums (HDU)	5
German Vinyl Albums (Offizielle Top 100)	1

== Certifications and sales ==
Certifications
Region	Certification	Certified units/sales
Australia (ARIA)	Platinum	70,000^{‡}
Belgium (BRMA)	Gold	10,000^{‡}
Canada (Music Canada)	2× Platinum	160,000^{‡}
Denmark (IFPI Danmark)	Gold	10,000^{‡}
France (SNEP)	Gold	50,000^{‡}
Italy (FIMI)	Gold	25,000^{‡}
New Zealand (RMNZ)	Platinum	15,000^{‡}
Poland (ZPAV)	Gold	15,000^{‡}
Portugal (AFP)	Platinum	7,000^{‡}
Spain (Promusicae)	Platinum	40,000^{‡}
United Kingdom (BPI)	Platinum	300,000^{‡}
United States	—	346,000 (Note: Pure sales in the US as of July 2026)
^{‡} Sales+streaming figures based on certification alone.

== Release history ==
Release history
Region	Date	Format(s)	Edition	Label	Ref.
Various	June 12, 2026	Cassette; CD; download; streaming; LP (Note: The master for all vinyl pressings features missing bridges, outros, and other musical passages on multiple tracks, including "Honeybee", "Maggots for Brains", "The Cure", and "Cigarette Smoke".)	Standard	Geffen	
United States	June 12, 2026	CD; LP	Target exclusive	Geffen	
United States	June 12, 2026	LP	US exclusive	Geffen	
Various	June 14, 2026	Download	Bonus track (Note: Includes bonus track "Never Do".)	Geffen	

== See also ==
- List of 2026 albums
- List of Billboard 200 number-one albums of 2026
- List of number-one albums from the 2020s (New Zealand)
- List of number-one albums of 2026 (Australia)
- List of number-one albums of 2026 (Canada)
- List of number-one albums of 2026 (Ireland)
- List of number-one albums of 2026 (Portugal)
- List of number-one albums of 2026 (Scotland)
- List of number-one albums of 2026 (Spain)
- List of UK Albums Chart number ones of the 2020s
