= Devon Again =

American singer-songwriter (born 2000)

- Born: Devon Johanningmeier; December 27, 2000 (age 25); Denver, Colorado, U.S.
- Genres: Alternative pop
- Occupations: Singer; songwriter
- Years active: 2020–present
- Labels: Amusement; Interscope
- Website: devonagain.bigcartel.com

Devon Johanningmeier (born December 27, 2000), known professionally as Devon Again, is an American singer-songwriter. She first gained exposure through SoundCloud and TikTok, eventually releasing two EPs, Pee (2022) and In Order (2025), independently. She has toured with multiple musicians—including Chappell Roan and Maude Latour—and is set to open for Olivia Rodrigo on The Unraveled Tour.

== Early life and education ==
Devon Johanningmeier was born on December 27, 2000. She was raised near Denver, Colorado, and briefly lived at a residential treatment program for substance abuse, where her mother worked. In 2019, she said that both her parents had a history with substance abuse and that the death of uncle Ryan Johanningmeier in 2015, due to opiate addiction, was a major moment in her adolescence.

Again attended the Denver School of the Arts. She majored in vocals, graduating in 2019. After high school, Again studied at the Musicians Institute in Los Angeles. She grew disenchanted with the program's curriculum and left after one semester. She identifies as queer.

== Career ==
In November 2020, Again became popular on TikTok for posting her singing, including in a duet with a polka beat. The social media popularity led her to meetings with record labels and industry professionals. Her early single "Suburbia" (2021) and EP Pee (2022) were both co-written and produced by Cameron Hale. In 2023, Ones to Watch writer Abby Kenna commented that her performance style creates an "alt-pop rage room; the line between laughing and crying blurs in the mad therapy of the music."

With Pizzaslime Records—an imprint of Mad Decent—Again released the EP In Order in November 2025. The writing and recording of the EP proceeded slowly, with Again and producer Jon Buscema working multiple times a week only to reach a breakthrough "once in a blue moon." She considered quitting music, but Chappell Roan encouraged her to keep trying.

In May 2026, Again became the second artist on the Amusement Records label—an independent label founded by Dan Nigro for Roan—with support via Interscope Records. Her primary collaborator Buscema had joined the label the previous January as producer and songwriter, with support from Sony Music Publishing. In the lead-up to her debut album, she released "snake the drain" and "this time it's different" on June 2, 2026.

Again was announced as part of the support for the American leg of Olivia Rodrigo's The Unraveled Tour, set to begin in November 2026. She previously opened for Chappell Roan in 2022 and Maude Latour in 2023. She also performed in a showcase for Universal Music Australia in May 2026, alongside Katseye and Violet Grohl.

== Discography ==
=== EPs ===
Title	Details
Pee	Released: 2022; Self-released; Format: Digital download; Co-written, produced by Cameron Hale
In Order	Released: 2025; Label: Pizzaslime Records; Format: Digital download; Co-written, produced by Jon Buscema
