= The Cure (Olivia Rodrigo song) =

2026 single by Olivia Rodrigo

Single by Olivia Rodrigo

from the album You Seem Pretty Sad for a Girl So in Love
- B-side: "Never Do" (demo)
- Released: May 22, 2026
- Genre: Alternative rock; indie rock; pop
- Length: 4:57 (original version); 4:29 (album vinyl/cassette version)
- Label: Geffen
- Songwriters: Olivia Rodrigo; Dan Nigro
- Producer: Dan Nigro

Olivia Rodrigo singles chronology
"Drop Dead" (2026)	"The Cure" (2026)	"Stupid Song" (2026)

Music video
- "The Cure" on YouTube

"The Cure" (stylized in all lowercase) is a song by American singer-songwriter Olivia Rodrigo and the second single from her third studio album, You Seem Pretty Sad for a Girl So in Love. It was released by Geffen Records on May 22, 2026. An alternative rock, indie rock, and pop track with themes of doubt and emotional isolation, Rodrigo wrote it with Dan Nigro, who also serves as its producer.

"The Cure" topped the charts in Australia, Ireland, and Singapore and reached the top ten in Austria, Canada, Germany, Greece, New Zealand, Portugal, the United Kingdom, and the United States. At the 69th Annual Grammy Awards, it was nominated for Record of the Year, Song of the Year, and Best Pop Solo Performance. Rodrigo included "The Cure" on the set list of the Unraveled Tour (2026–2027).

== Background ==
In March 2026, Olivia Rodrigo described the thematic direction of her third studio album in an interview with British Vogue. She stated that it predominantly features "sad love songs", explaining that many of her favorite romantic tracks derive their appeal from an undercurrent of fear or longing. It takes inspiration from Rodrigo's time in London. Multiple tracks are said to reference the relationship of Sex and the City characters Miranda Hobbes and Steve Brady. Speaking of the album's conception and the influence of Sex and the City on the tracks, Rodrigo stated: "Like, when Miranda and Steve are getting back together, she's crying. 'Steve, anytime something funny happens, I just want to tell you.' And I remember watching that and being like, 'Oh, my God, I have to write a song about this.'"

On April 2, 2026, the album title was unveiled after being painted on a pink wall in Los Angeles and hinted with the final word ("love") in many cities. Rodrigo continued her collaboration with Dan Nigro, who returned as its producer. She released "Drop Dead" as the lead single on April 17, and the album track "Begged" was premiered on Saturday Night Live on May 2.

== Release and promotion ==
Rodrigo announced "The Cure" as the second single from You Seem Pretty Sad for a Girl So in Love, along with its artwork and release date, on May 19, 2026. She stated that it is her "favorite song on the album and one of my favorite songs I've ever made". Rodrigo called it the "thesis statement" and "the climax of the record", saying that it "made the whole album click" for her. It was released on May 22 on digital media and physical formats such as 7-inch and cassette, coinciding with World Goth Day; Billboard's Hannah Dailey noted that the song title might reference the goth rock band the Cure, whom Rodrigo is a fan of, but Rodrigo later confirmed that the song was not related to the band. "The Cure" appears as the eighth track on the album. Physical editions feature a demo version of the bonus track "Never Do" on the B-side. Rodrigo debuted "The Cure" live with background singers at BBC Radio 1's Live Lounge on June 2 and later performed it on Jimmy Kimmel Live! on June 10. It was featured in the 2026 film Practical Magic 2 and was included on the set list of the Unraveled Tour, which commenced on September 25 in Hartford, United States. It was also included at her surprise set at Primavera Sound. Rodrigo performed a second One Night Only concert that took place on August 6 at Warsaw in Brooklyn, New York. (Note: Attributed to The Guardian, The Brooklyn Paper, Stereogum, PIX 11, and NME.) She included the song in the set list.

== Composition ==
"The Cure" is four minutes and fifty-seven seconds long. Nigro handled production. He plays guitar, bass, piano, and provides the drum programming and string arrangement; Paul Cartwright plays the cello, viola, and violin; Sterling Laws plays drums; and Bryn Bliska plays the synth. Mike Bozzi mastered the song, and Mitch McCarthy mixed it.

"The Cure" has been labeled as a downtempo rock, alternative rock, indie rock, and pop track. It begins with rapid acoustic guitar strumming and gradually builds in intensity before culminating in a climactic section and a string-accompanied coda. Variety's Chris Willman compared its somber atmosphere and restrained buildup to 1990s alternative rock, including the music of American bands the Smashing Pumpkins and Foo Fighters. Although "The Cure" incorporates elements of Rodrigo's earlier rock-oriented work, it relies less heavily on electric guitars.

"The Cure" is centered around a melancholic acoustic guitar melody. Its lyrics address themes of doubt, mistrust, emotional isolation, and misplaced faith in another person. In the verses, Rodrigo describes loneliness and intrusive thoughts while reflecting on a relationship she initially viewed as an "antidote". The song gradually builds toward an anguished chorus in which she uses medicinal imagery to portray love as an ineffective remedy for her emotional struggles.

== Critical reception ==
Pitchfork awarded "The Cure" a designation of "Best New Track". The outlet's Quinn Moreland praised the song as a "rollicking single" from Rodrigo's upcoming album. Moreland highlighted the gradual build and explosive climax as a "mature step forward" for her, noting its shift away from railing against toxic exes toward confronting her own reflection. Robin Murray of Clash described "The Cure" as Rodrigo's "crowning achievement". He emphasized its ambitious scope, calling it "dense in ideas" and "superbly ambitious in execution". Murray also noted Rodrigo's own comment that the track "made the whole album click". Robert Barry of The Quietus called the song the "alt-rock climax to the album".

== Commercial performance ==
In the United States, "The Cure" debuted at number five on the Billboard Hot 100 issued for June 6, 2026, becoming the eighth top-ten single of Rodrigo's career and You Seem Pretty Sad for a Girl So in Love's second after the chart-topper "Drop Dead". In Canada, the song peaked at number six on the Canadian Hot 100 on the chart dated June 27. It entered at number two on the UK Singles Chart as Rodrigo's tenth top-ten single.

"The Cure" opened at number two on the Billboard Global 200. It entered at number one in Australia and number four in New Zealand. It also peaked within the top fifteen in several other markets: number one in Ireland and Singapore, number six in Austria, number eight in Germany and Portugal, number nine in Greece, number eleven in Hong Kong and the Netherlands, number twelve in Luxembourg, and number thirteen in Malaysia.

== Music video ==
The official music video for "The Cure" was released on May 22, 2026. Directed by Cat Solen and Jaime Gerin, it features Rodrigo as a 1950s nurse attempting to save hearts at a hospital before becoming a patient there herself. At the end, it is revealed that the plot took place inside a cardboard dollhouse, which Rodrigo stomps on while unpacking her belongings in an empty room. It won Best Alternative Video at the 2026 MTV Video Music Awards.

== Accolades ==
Awards and nominations
Organization	Year	Category	Result	Ref.
MTV Video Music Awards	2026	Best Alternative Video	Won	
UK Music Video Awards	2026	Best Production Design in a Video	Nominated	
Grammy Awards	2027	Record of the Year	Pending	
Grammy Awards	2027	Song of the Year	Pending	
Grammy Awards	2027	Best Pop Solo Performance	Pending	

== Personnel ==
These credits have been adapted from music streaming services Apple Music, Spotify, and Tidal.

- Olivia Rodrigo – songwriting, lead vocals, background vocals
- Dan Nigro – production (for "Never Do" and "The Cure"), songwriting, guitar, background vocals, bass, drum programming, piano, string arrangement
- Paul Cartwright – string arrangement, cello, viola, violin
- Sterling Laws – drums
- Mike Bozzi – audio mastering
- Mitch McCarthy – audio mixing
- Bryn Bliska – synth
- Randy Merrill – mastering engineer (for "Never Do")

== Track listing ==
7-inch vinyl and cassette

1. "The Cure" – 4:57
2. "Never Do" (demo) – 3:41

== Charts ==
=== Weekly charts ===
Weekly chart performance
Chart (2026)	Peak position
Argentina Hot 100 (Billboard)	28
Australia (ARIA)	1
Austria (Ö3 Austria Top 40)	6
Belgium (Ultratop 50 Flanders)	31
Bolivia Airplay (Monitor Latino)	12
Brazil Hot 100 (Billboard)	38
Canada Hot 100 (Billboard)	6
Canada Modern Rock (Billboard Canada)	37
Central America Anglo Airplay (Monitor Latino)	8
Chile Anglo Airplay (Monitor Latino)	10
Costa Rica Anglo Airplay (Monitor Latino)	15
Croatia International Airplay (Top lista)	94
Czech Republic Singles Digital (ČNS IFPI)	22
Dominican Republic Anglo Airplay (Monitor Latino)	10
Estonia Airplay (TopHit)	99
France (SNEP)	43
Germany (GfK)	8
Global 200 (Billboard)	2
Greece International (IFPI)	9
Guatemala Anglo Airplay (Monitor Latino)	7
Hong Kong (Billboard)	11
Indonesia (IFPI)	10
Ireland (IRMA)	1
Israel (Mako Hitlist)	79
Italy (FIMI)	90
Japan Hot Overseas (Billboard Japan)	8
Latin America Anglo Airplay (Monitor Latino)	20
Latvia Streaming (LaIPA)	14
Lebanon (Lebanese Top 20)	17
Lithuania (AGATA)	36
Luxembourg (Billboard)	12
Malaysia (IFPI)	13
Malaysia International (RIM)	8
Mexico Anglo Airplay (Monitor Latino)	3
Netherlands (Single Top 100)	11
New Zealand (Recorded Music NZ)	4
Nigeria Airplay (TurnTable)	59
Norway (VG-lista)	33
Panama International (PRODUCE)	48
Philippines (IFPI)	7
Philippines Hot 100 (Billboard Philippines)	4
Poland Streaming (OLiS)	31
Portugal (AFP)	8
Singapore (RIAS)	1
Slovakia Singles Digital (ČNS IFPI)	23
South Africa Streaming (TOSAC)	66
Spain (Promusicae)	24
Sweden (Sverigetopplistan)	23
Switzerland (Schweizer Hitparade)	16
United Arab Emirates (IFPI)	20
UK Singles (Official Charts)	2
Uruguay Anglo Airplay (Monitor Latino)	9
US Billboard Hot 100	5
US Hot Rock & Alternative Songs (Billboard)	1
Venezuela Anglo Airplay (Monitor Latino)	5

=== Monthly charts ===
Monthly chart performance
Chart (2026)	Peak position
Lithuania Airplay (TopHit)	76
Panama Streaming (PRODUCE)	94

== Certifications ==
Certifications
Region	Certification	Certified units/sales
Belgium (BRMA)	Gold	20,000^{‡}
Canada (Music Canada)	2× Platinum	160,000^{‡}
New Zealand (RMNZ)	Platinum	30,000^{‡}
Portugal (AFP)	Platinum	25,000^{‡}
United Kingdom (BPI)	Platinum	600,000^{‡}
Streaming
Czech Republic (ČNS IFPI)	Gold	2,500,000^{†}
^{‡} Sales+streaming figures based on certification alone.^{†} Streaming-only figures based on certification alone.

== Release history ==
Release dates and format(s) for "The Cure"
Region	Date	Format(s)	Label(s)	Ref.
Various	May 22, 2026	7-inch; cassette; digital download; streaming	Geffen	

== See also ==
- List of number-one singles of 2026 (Australia)
- List of number-one singles of 2026 (Ireland)
