= My Way (Olivia Rodrigo song) =

Song by Olivia Rodrigo

from the album You Seem Pretty Sad for a Girl So in Love
- Released: June 12, 2026
- Genre: Baroque pop; new wave; pop-punk; pop rock; post-punk
- Length: 3:00
- Label: Geffen
- Songwriters: Olivia Rodrigo; Steph Jones; Dan Nigro
- Producer: Dan Nigro

Lyric video
- "My Way" on YouTube

"My Way" (stylized in all lowercase) is a song by American singer-songwriter Olivia Rodrigo from her third studio album, You Seem Pretty Sad for a Girl So in Love, released on June 12, 2026, by Geffen Records. Rodrigo wrote the song with Steph Jones and its producer, Dan Nigro.

== Background ==
In March 2026, Olivia Rodrigo described the thematic direction of her third studio album in an interview with British Vogue. She stated that the album predominantly features "sad love songs", explaining that many of her favorite romantic tracks derive their appeal from an undercurrent of fear or longing. The album takes inspiration from Rodrigo's time in London. Multiple tracks on the album are said to reference the relationship of Sex and the City characters Miranda Hobbes and Steve Brady. On April 2, 2026, the album title was unveiled after being painted on a pink wall in Los Angeles and hinted with the final word in the album title in many cities. Rodrigo continued her collaboration with Dan Nigro, who returned to be the album's producer. Rodrigo released "Drop Dead" as the lead single on April 17, 2026. A second song from the album, called "Begged", was performed on Saturday Night Live on May 2, 2026.

Speaking of the album's conception and the influence of Sex and the City on the tracks, Rodrigo stated: "Like, when Miranda and Steve are getting back together, she's crying. 'Steve, anytime something funny happens, I just want to tell you.' And I remember watching that and being like, 'Oh, my God, I have to write a song about this.'" You Seem Pretty Sad for a Girl So in Love features thirteen tracks, of which "My Way" appears as the sixth.

== Composition ==
"My Way" is three minutes long. It is a rock, baroque pop, new wave, pop-punk, pop rock, and post-punk song with synth-pop influences. The lyrics depict Rodrigo confronting a woman whom she believes is pursuing Rodrigo's romantic partner and interfering in their relationship. Rodrigo adopts a possessive and confrontational tone, insisting that the woman is "in my way" and demanding that she stop pursuing him. In the verses, she accuses the woman of repeatedly contacting her partner, sending him poems, and posting photographs of herself wearing his clothes, which critics believed implied that the woman is one of the ex's former romantic connections. In the bridge, she declares that she has "won", calls the woman's behavior "fucking weird", and refers to her own self as a "petty bitch" while maintaining that the confrontation was warranted.

== Critical reception ==
Hannah Dailey of Billboard ranked it at as the ninth-best song on You Seem Pretty Sad for a Girl So in Love, stating that it "finally shows her approaching [jealousy] from a fiery, self-possessed and even territorial perspective while scolding a girl who's been making moves on her man [...] she sings over an electric guitar mix that would make Avril Lavigne proud, finally realizing that she's that girl". Similarly, Julyssa Lopez of Rolling Stone noted that she is "fully territorial" on the song. Alex Rigotti of NME called the song "a deliciously bitchy pop-rock anthem that's the closest thing to Guts as we get here, Rodrigo fends off a rival who can't keep her eyes off her boyfriend".

== Commercial performance ==
"My Way" debuted at number 15 on the US Billboard Hot 100 issued for June 27, 2026. In Canada, the song entered at number 17 on the Canadian Hot 100 on the chart for the same date. In the United Kingdom, it debuted at number nine on the Official Audio Streaming Chart. In Australia, "My Way" debuted at number 13. The song entered at number 12 in New Zealand. It debuted at number 10 on the Billboard Global 200. "My Way" also charted at number 3 on Sweden Heatseeker, number 20 in Portugal, and Singapore, number 59 in Germany, and number 78 on the Brasil Hot 100.

== Credits and personnel ==
These credits have been adapted from Tidal.

- Olivia Rodrigo – composer, lyricist, vocals, background vocals
- Dan Nigro – producer, composer, lyricist, bass, background vocals, drum programming, engineer, guitar, moog, programming
- Steph Jones – composer, lyricist
- Sterling Laws – drums
- Chris Kasych – engineer
- Randy Merrill – mastering engineer
- Mitch McCarthy – mixing

== Charts ==
Chart positions for "My Way"
Chart (2026)	Peak position
Argentina Hot 100 (Billboard)	72
Australia (ARIA)	13
Brazil Hot 100 (Billboard)	78
Canada Hot 100 (Billboard)	17
Czech Republic Singles Digital (ČNS IFPI)	73
France (SNEP)	163
Germany (GfK)	59
Greece International (IFPI)	24
Global 200 (Billboard)	10
New Zealand (Recorded Music NZ)	12
Philippines Hot 100 (Billboard Philippines)	33
Poland (Polish Streaming Top 100)	73
Portugal (AFP)	20
Singapore (RIAS)	20
Slovakia Singles Digital (ČNS IFPI)	74
Spain (Promusicae)	61
Sweden Heatseeker (Sverigetopplistan)	3
UK Streaming (OCC)	9
US Billboard Hot 100	15
US Hot Rock & Alternative Songs (Billboard)	3

== Certifications ==
Certifications
Region	Certification	Certified units/sales
Canada (Music Canada)	Gold	40,000^{‡}
^{‡} Sales+streaming figures based on certification alone.
