= Honeybee (song) =

- "Walk in the Park" limited-edition vinyl cover

Promotional single by Olivia Rodrigo

from the album You Seem Pretty Sad for a Girl So in Love
- B-side: "Cigarette Smoke"
- Released: June 12, 2026
- Genre: Acoustic pop
- Length: 3:43 (original version); 3:09 (album vinyl/cassette version)
- Label: Geffen
- Songwriter: Olivia Rodrigo
- Producer: Dan Nigro

Lyric video
- "Honeybee" on YouTube

"Honeybee" (stylized in all lowercase) is a song by American singer-songwriter Olivia Rodrigo from her third studio album, You Seem Pretty Sad for a Girl So in Love, released on June 12, 2026, by Geffen Records. Rodrigo wrote the song, and Dan Nigro produced it.

== Background ==
In March 2026, Olivia Rodrigo described the thematic direction of her third studio album in an interview with British Vogue. She stated that it predominantly features "sad love songs", explaining that many of her favorite romantic tracks derive their appeal from an undercurrent of fear or longing. "Honeybee" was the first love song that Rodrigo wrote for it; she described her process as compositing various clichés she knew, including incorporating Easter eggs in the French language. She also cited Hugh Grant's character in Notting Hill (1999) as inspiration for the lyric "Let's just walk in the dark / Hop the fence in the park." On April 2, 2026, the album title was unveiled after being painted on a pink wall in Los Angeles and hinted with the final word in the title in many cities. Rodrigo continued her collaboration with Dan Nigro, who returned to be its producer.

"Honeybee" was available for sale on June 12, 2026, as part of a promotional "Walk in the Park" limited-edition vinyl which also included "Cigarette Smoke", exclusively at record stores celebrating the release of You Seem Pretty Sad for a Girl So in Love.

== Composition ==
The song is an acoustic pop piano ballad, with a string quartet and ethereal layered harmonies, along with a choir in the outro. The lyrics revolve around an uncertain relationship, with Rodrigo comparing her lover to a honey bee, as she fears he will abruptly end it while hoping they will stay. She evokes romantic imagery, including shooting stars, racing cars, and "sticky sweet tangerine." The song also features background vocals from Conan Gray, a close friend of Rodrigo.

== Critical reception ==
"Honeybee" received positive reviews. Hannah Dailey of Billboard ranked it as the fifth best track on You Seem Pretty Sad for a Girl So in Love. Writing for Rolling Stone, Julyssa Lopez described it as demonstrating Rodrigo's ability to "dive into her insecurities with a mix of humor and honesty." Alex Rigotti of NME complimented the song's "cinematic quality".

== Commercial performance ==
"Honeybee" debuted at number nine on the US Billboard Hot 100 issued for June 27, 2026, accompanied in the top ten by "Stupid Song" and You Seem Pretty Sad for a Girl So in Love's previous singles "Drop Dead" and "The Cure". "Honeybee" and "Stupid Song" concurrently increased Rodrigo's career top ten entries to 10, and the album's total to four. In Canada, the former song entered at number nine on the Canadian Hot 100 on the chart for the same date. In the United Kingdom, it debuted at number eight on the Official Audio Streaming Chart.

In Australia, "Honeybee" debuted at number seven. The song entered at number nine in New Zealand. It debuted at number five on the Billboard Global 200. "Honeybee" also charted at number 6 in Singapore, number 10 in Portugal, number 17 in Malaysia, number 21 in Hong Kong, number 41 in Germany, number 57 in Norway, number 80 in Lithuania, and number 83 in Sweden.

== Personnel ==
These credits have been adapted from Tidal.

- Olivia Rodrigo – lead vocals and composition
- Arianna Powell – guitar
- Conan Gray – background vocals
- Daniel Nigro – production, background vocals, bass, drum programming, engineering, Mellotron, mixing
- Lily Elise – background vocals
- Noah Conrad – piano
- Paul Cartwright – string arrangement, viola, violin
- Randy Merrill – mastering

== Track listing ==
7-inch "Walk In The Park" vinyl and cassette

1. "Honeybee" – 3:43
2. "Cigarette Smoke" – 5:40

== Charts ==
Chart positions for "Honeybee"
| Chart (2026) | Peak position |
|---|---|
| Argentina Hot 100 (Billboard) | 57 |
| Australia (ARIA) | 7 |
| Brazil Hot 100 (Billboard) | 50 |
| Canada Hot 100 (Billboard) | 9 |
| Czech Republic Singles Digital (ČNS IFPI) | 77 |
| France (SNEP) | 99 |
| Germany (GfK) | 41 |
| Global 200 (Billboard) | 5 |
| Greece International (IFPI) | 14 |
| Hong Kong (Billboard) | 21 |
| Ireland (IRMA) | 22 |
| Lithuania (AGATA) | 80 |
| Malaysia (IFPI) | 12 |
| Malaysia International (RIM) | 6 |
| New Zealand (Recorded Music NZ) | 9 |
| Norway (IFPI Norge) | 57 |
| Panama Streaming (PRODUCE) | 64 |
| Philippines (IFPI) | 17 |
| Philippines Hot 100 (Billboard Philippines) | 16 |
| Poland (Polish Streaming Top 100) | 75 |
| Portugal (AFP) | 10 |
| Singapore (RIAS) | 6 |
| Slovakia Singles Digital (ČNS IFPI) | 59 |
| South Africa Streaming (TOSAC) | 67 |
| Spain (Promusicae) | 43 |
| Sweden (Sverigetopplistan) | 83 |
| United Arab Emirates (IFPI) | 18 |
| UK Singles (Official Charts) | 30 |
| US Billboard Hot 100 | 9 |

== Certifications ==
Certifications
| Region | Certification | Certified units/sales |
|---|---|---|
| Canada (Music Canada) | Platinum | 80,000^{‡} |
| Portugal (AFP) | Gold | 12,000^{‡} |
| United Kingdom (BPI) | Silver | 200,000^{‡} |
^{‡} Sales+streaming figures based on certification alone.
