= Stupid Song =

2026 song by Olivia Rodrigo

Single by Olivia Rodrigo

from the album You Seem Pretty Sad for a Girl So in Love
- B-side: "Stupid Song" (piano version)
- Released: June 12, 2026
- Genre: Pop rock; synth-rock
- Length: 3:29
- Label: Geffen
- Songwriters: Olivia Rodrigo; Dan Nigro
- Producer: Dan Nigro

Olivia Rodrigo singles chronology
"The Cure" (2026)	"Stupid Song" (2026)	"Serena Joy" (2026)

Music video
- "Stupid Song" on YouTube

"Stupid Song" (stylized in all lowercase) is a song by American singer-songwriter Olivia Rodrigo and the third single from her third studio album, You Seem Pretty Sad for a Girl So in Love. Rodrigo wrote it with its producer, Dan Nigro. A music video for the song was released alongside the album on June 12, 2026; it was serviced to radio stations on July 13.

"Stupid Song" charted at number one in Australia, Ireland, New Zealand and the Global 200, as well as within the top ten in Austria, Canada, Germany, the Netherlands, Portugal, Singapore, Switzerland, the United Kingdom, and the United States. Rodrigo included "Stupid Song" on the set list of the Unraveled Tour (2026–2027).

== Background and release ==
In March 2026, Olivia Rodrigo described the thematic direction of her third studio album in an interview with British Vogue. She stated that the album predominantly features "sad love songs", explaining that many of her favorite romantic tracks derive their appeal from an undercurrent of fear or longing. On April 2, the album title, You Seem Pretty Sad for a Girl So in Love, was unveiled after being painted on a pink wall in Los Angeles and hinted with the final word in the album title in many cities. Rodrigo continued her collaboration with Dan Nigro, who returned to be the album's producer. Rodrigo released "Drop Dead" as the lead single on April 17. This was followed by the second single, "The Cure", on May 22.

The track list for You Seem Pretty Sad for a Girl So in Love, which featured the second track, "Stupid Song", in its Girl So in Love section, was revealed on May 26. Rodrigo was inspired to write the song after reading Annie Ernaux's 1992 novel Simple Passion, in which the protagonist has an affair with someone but does not feel truly happy and is instead overcome by longing and obsession. Rodrigo wanted to capture how "love makes you insane and miserable" and uncover the depressing feelings someone experiences while in a romantic relationship. "Stupid Song" was released concurrently with the album as its third single on June 12.

== Composition ==
"Stupid Song" is three minutes and twenty-nine seconds long. Nigro produced the song, engineering it with Chris Kasych and programming it with Bryn Bliska. Nigro played the bass and guitar and provided the drum programming and string arrangement; Sterling Laws played drums; Noah Conrad played piano; and Paul Cartwright played the viola and violin. Mitch McCarthy mixed the song, and Mike Bozzi mastered it with assistance from Jack Doutt.

"Stupid Song" is a pop rock and synth-rock song with an "indie pop bent", according to Billboard. Its lyrics depict Rodrigo's infatuation with a partner. In the opening verse, she sings about her friends smoking blunts and reflects on her inability to fit in with confident girls at a party. Rodrigo imagines conversations with her partner and admits to constantly thinking about what he might say to her. Later, she compares him to "a spark in the dark" and describes her attraction through imagery of fire, singing that her clothes "caught aflame". As the song progresses, Rodrigo portrays her emotions as increasingly uncontrollable, likening herself to a car "speeding down the boulevard without a brake" and declaring that she wants the person "more than any stupid song could ever say".

== Critical reception ==
"Stupid Song" received critical acclaim. Ranking it as the best song on You Seem Pretty Sad for a Girl in Love, Billboard's Hannah Dailey thought that its quality defied the title: "'Stupid Song' is anything but what its title implies." She complimented the arrangement and pacing and thought Rodrigo's climbing vocals were delivered effortlessly. Alexis Petridis of The Guardian stated that "Stupid Song" had a "show tune-like melody" and exemplified that "the songs [on the album] are uniformly well written".

== Commercial performance ==
"Stupid Song" debuted at number three on the US Billboard Hot 100 issued for June 27, 2026, accompanied in the top ten by "Honeybee" and You Seem Pretty Sad for a Girl So in Love's previous singles "Drop Dead" and "The Cure". "Stupid Song" and "Honeybee" concurrently increased Rodrigo's career top ten entries to 10, and the album's total to four. In Canada, the former song entered at number two on the Canadian Hot 100 on the chart for the same date. It debuted at number two on the UK Singles Chart.

In Australia, "Stupid Song" debuted at number one. The song entered at number one in New Zealand. It debuted at number one on the Billboard Global 200. According to Luminate data the song drew 67.7 million streams and sold 3,000 downloads. "Stupid Song" also peaked within the top 10 at number one in Ireland, number two in Greece, Hong Kong, Portugal, and Singapore, number three in Austria, number four in Switzerland, number six in Germany, number seven in the Netherlands, and number eight in Luxembourg and Malaysia.

== Music video ==
Rodrigo in the music video for "Stupid Song"

On June 9, 2026, Rodrigo announced during her appearance on Radio 1 Breakfast that she had filmed a music video for "Stupid Song". She filmed under the code word "dumb tune" to prevent leaking which song it was shot for.

The video, directed by Mitch Ryan, was released alongside the album on June 12. Principal filming took place on May 26, 2026; from 6 a.m. to 11 a.m. The video depicts Rodrigo "wander[ing] around New York's Upper West Side followed by a troupe of ballerinas who cluster, pirouette and, at one point, mosh around her." The choreography is by Tiler Peck, who also appears as one of its dancers. One of the ballerinas is from American Ballet Theatre, while the rest are Peck's colleagues from New York City Ballet.

== Live performances and other usage ==
Rodrigo premiered "Stupid Song" live at Jimmy Kimmel Live!'s after show performance on June 11, 2026, where she also performed "The Cure". It was featured in the Heartstopper Forever trailer and included in a Spider-Man: Brand New Day teaser uploaded to Sony's official social media. It was included on the set list of the Unraveled Tour, which commenced on September 25 in Hartford, United States.

== Credits and personnel ==
These credits are adapted from the liner notes of You Seem Pretty Sad for a Girl So in Love.

- Dan Nigro – producer, songwriter, engineer, bass, drum programming, guitar, string arrangement, programming, background vocals
- Olivia Rodrigo – vocals, background vocals, songwriter
- Sterling Laws – drums
- Noah Conrad – piano
- Paul Cartwright – viola, violin
- Chris Kasych – engineer
- Bryn Bliska – programming
- Thomas Holmes – programming assistance
- Mike Bozzi – mastering
- Jack Doutt – mastering assistance
- Mitch McCarthy – mixing

== Charts ==
=== Weekly charts ===
Weekly chart performance
Chart (2026)	Peak position
Argentina Hot 100 (Billboard)	26
Australia (ARIA)	1
Australia Airplay (RCS)	1
Austria (Ö3 Austria Top 40)	3
Belgium (Ultratop 50 Flanders)	40
Brazil Hot 100 (Billboard)	23
Canada Hot 100 (Billboard)	2
Canada CHR/Top 40 (Billboard)	1
Canada Hot AC (Billboard)	31
Central America Anglo Airplay (Monitor Latino)	11
Colombia Anglo Airplay (Monitor Latino)	8
Costa Rica Anglo Airplay (Monitor Latino)	7
Czech Republic Singles Digital (ČNS IFPI)	15
Denmark (Tracklisten)	22
Dominican Republic Anglo Airplay (Monitor Latino)	18
Estonia Airplay (TopHit)	56
Finland (Suomen virallinen lista)	34
France (SNEP)	36
Germany (GfK)	6
Global 200 (Billboard)	1
Greece International (IFPI)	2
Guatemala Anglo Airplay (Monitor Latino)	8
Hong Kong (Billboard)	2
Hungary (Single Top 40)	37
India International (IMI)	3
Ireland (IRMA)	1
Israel (Mako Hitlist)	71
Italy (FIMI)	56
Italy Airplay (EarOne)	23
Japan Hot Overseas (Billboard Japan)	18
Kazakhstan Airplay (TopHit)	51
Latvia Airplay (LaIPA)	9
Latvia Streaming (LaIPA)	11
Lebanon (Lebanese Top 20)	9
Lithuania (AGATA)	16
Luxembourg (Billboard)	8
Malaysia (IFPI)	8
Malaysia International (RIM)	6
Mexico Anglo Airplay (Monitor Latino)	2
Middle East and North Africa (IFPI)	12
Moldova Airplay (TopHit)	92
Netherlands (Dutch Top 40)	23
Netherlands (Single Top 100)	7
New Zealand (Recorded Music NZ)	1
Nigeria (TurnTable Top 100)	62
Nigeria Airplay (TurnTable)	31
Norway (VG-lista)	28
Panama Streaming (PRODUCE)	39
Peru Airplay (Monitor Latino)	20
Philippines (IFPI)	10
Philippines Hot 100 (Billboard Philippines)	7
Poland Streaming (OLiS)	21
Portugal (AFP)	2
Romania (Billboard)	12
Romania TV Airplay (Media Forest)	19
San Marino Airplay (SMRTV Top 50)	24
Saudi Arabia (IFPI)	18
Singapore (RIAS)	2
Slovakia Singles Digital (ČNS IFPI)	11
South Africa Streaming (TOSAC)	31
Spain (Promusicae)	17
Sweden (Sverigetopplistan)	15
Switzerland (Schweizer Hitparade)	4
Taiwan (Billboard)	13
United Arab Emirates (IFPI)	5
UK Singles (Official Charts)	2
US Billboard Hot 100	3
US Adult Contemporary (Billboard)	27
US Adult Pop Airplay (Billboard)	14
US Pop Airplay (Billboard)	1
Venezuela Airplay (Record Report)	44

=== Monthly charts ===
Monthly chart performance
Chart (2026)	Peak position
Estonia Airplay (TopHit)	66
Kazakhstan Airplay (TopHit)	53
Lithuania Airplay (TopHit)	80

== Certifications ==
Certifications
Region	Certification	Certified units/sales
Canada (Music Canada)	2× Platinum	160,000^{‡}
New Zealand (RMNZ)	Gold	15,000^{‡}
Portugal (AFP)	Platinum	25,000^{‡}
United Kingdom (BPI)	Gold	400,000^{‡}
^{‡} Sales+streaming figures based on certification alone.

== Release history ==
Release dates and format(s) for "Stupid Song"
Region	Date	Format(s)	Label(s)	Ref.
Various	June 12, 2026	Digital download; streaming	Geffen	
United States	July 13, 2026	Contemporary hit radio	Interscope	
Italy	September 4, 2026	Radio airplay	EMI	
Various	September 25, 2026	Cassette; 7" vinyl	Geffen	

== See also ==
- List of number-one singles of 2026 (Australia)
- List of number-one singles of 2026 (Ireland)
