= Less (song) =

Song by Olivia Rodrigo

from the album You Seem Pretty Sad for a Girl So in Love
- Released: June 12, 2026
- Length: 3:13
- Label: Geffen
- Songwriters: Olivia Rodrigo; Dan Nigro
- Producer: Dan Nigro

Lyric video
- "Less" on YouTube

"Less" (stylized in all lowercase) is a song by American singer-songwriter Olivia Rodrigo from her third studio album, You Seem Pretty Sad for a Girl So in Love. Rodrigo wrote it with its producer, Dan Nigro. The song became available as the album's 11th track on June 12, 2026, when it was released by Geffen Records. With lyrics related to a "devastating breakup", it is considered one of the most heartbreaking and saddest songs in Rodrigo's catalog.

== Background ==
In March 2026, Olivia Rodrigo described the thematic direction of her third studio album in an interview with British Vogue. She stated that the album predominantly features "sad love songs", explaining that many of her favorite romantic tracks derive their appeal from an undercurrent of fear or longing. The album takes inspiration from Rodrigo's time in London. Multiple tracks on the album are said to reference the relationship of Sex and the City characters Miranda Hobbes and Steve Brady. On April 2, 2026, the album title was unveiled after being painted on a pink wall in Los Angeles and hinted with the final word in the album title in many cities. Rodrigo continued her collaboration with Dan Nigro, who returned to be the album's producer. Rodrigo released "Drop Dead" as the lead single on April 17, 2026. A second song from the album, called "Begged", was performed on Saturday Night Live on May 2, 2026.

"Less" appears as the 11th track on You Seem Pretty Sad For A Girl So In Love.

== Composition ==
"Less" is 3 minutes and 13 seconds long. Nigro produced the song with Noah Conrad serving as co-producer, and engineering was helmed by Nigro and Chris Kasych. Conrad played piano. Nigro mixed the song, and Randy Merrill mastered it.

== Critical reception ==
Ranking it as the 10th-best song on You Seem Pretty Sad for a Girl in Love, Billboard's Hannah Dailey wrote: "Written about the gradual, sickening realization that a relationship is already over — but not quite yet having the heart to pull the trigger — 'Less' is another of the simpler sounding tunes on You Seem Pretty Sad, carried by one of Rodrigo’s most heartbreaking hooks to date: 'If loving me means letting go and wishing me the best/ Then I guess I wish, I wish, I wish you loved me less.'"

== Credits and personnel ==
Credits are adapted from the liner notes of You Seem Pretty Sad for a Girl So in Love.

- Dan Nigro – producer, songwriter, engineer, mixing
- Noah Conrad – co-producer, piano
- Olivia Rodrigo – vocals, songwriter
- Amy Allen – songwriter
- Chris Kasych – engineer
- Randy Merrill – mastering

== Charts ==
Chart positions for "Less"
Chart (2026)	Peak position
Australia (ARIA)	15
Canada Hot 100 (Billboard)	20
Global 200 (Billboard)	16
Malaysia (Billboard)	22
New Zealand (Recorded Music NZ)	11
Panama Streaming (PRODUCE)	120
Singapore (RIAS)	10
Sweden Heatseeker (Sverigetopplistan)	9
UK Streaming (OCC)	21
US Billboard Hot 100	21
