= Expectations (Olivia Rodrigo song) =

- Digital cover

Single by Olivia Rodrigo featuring Chappell Roan

from the album You Seem Pretty Sad for a Girl So in Love
- B-side: "Expectations" (album version)
- Released: October 15, 2026
- Genre: New wave; synth-pop; baroque pop; dance-punk; electropop
- Length: 3:43
- Label: Interscope
- Songwriters: Olivia Rodrigo; Dan Nigro; Amy Allen; Kayleigh Rose Amstutz
- Producer: Dan Nigro

Olivia Rodrigo singles chronology
"Serena Joy" (2026)	"Expectations" (2026)	"Take Me Home (4 Christmas)" (2026)

Chappell Roan singles chronology
"The Subway" (2025)	"Expectations" (2026)

Music video
- "Expectations" on YouTube

"Expectations" is a song by American singer-songwriter Olivia Rodrigo from her third studio album, You Seem Pretty Sad for a Girl So in Love (2026). Rodrigo and Amy Allen wrote it alongside Dan Nigro, who produced it with Mike Wise. The song has charted within the top 10 in Australia, Austria, Canada, Germany, Ireland, New Zealand, the United Kingdom, and the United States, as well as the top 20 within the Netherlands, Sweden, and Switzerland. A remix featuring Chappell Roan was released as the album's fourth single on October 15, 2026, via Interscope Records.

== Background and release ==
In March 2026, Olivia Rodrigo described the thematic direction of her third studio album, You Seem Pretty Sad for a Girl So in Love, during an interview with British Vogue. She stated that the album predominantly features "sad love songs", explaining that many of her favorite romantic tracks derive their appeal from an undercurrent of fear or longing. The album takes inspiration from Rodrigo's time in London. Multiple tracks on the album are said to reference the relationship of Sex and the City characters Miranda Hobbes and Steve Brady.

Speaking of the album's conception and the influence of Sex and the City on the tracks, Rodrigo stated: "Like, when Miranda and Steve are getting back together, she's crying. 'Steve, anytime something funny happens, I just want to tell you.' And I remember watching that and being like, 'Oh, my God, I have to write a song about this.'" Released by Geffen Records on June 12, 2026, You Seem Pretty Sad for a Girl So in Love features thirteen tracks, of which "Expectations" appears as the twelfth. On October 12, she posted a recording to her Instagram story that featured someone saying, "Oh, Olivia does remixes now"; fans speculated that it was American singer Chappell Roan. The next day, Rodrigo announced the official remix of "Expectations", featuring Roan, which was released on October 15 through Interscope Records.

== Composition ==
"Expectations" is 3 minutes and 41 seconds long. It has been described as a new wave, synth-pop, baroque pop, dance-punk, and electropop song. Dan Nigro and Mike Wise produced, engineered, and programmed the song. Nigro provided drum programming and played bass and guitar; Wise played guitar; and Sterling Laws played drums. Mitch McCarthy mixed the song, and Randy Merrill mastered it. Bustle's Jake Viswanath stated that Rodrigo "gets dancier than ever before" on the song "over groovy synths and [19]80s guitars".

The penultimate track on You Seem Pretty Sad for a Girl So in Love, which follows the sentimental breakup song "Less", "Expectations" details Rodrigo's return to dating in Los Angeles after the relationship's end and the new expectations she sets up for potential suitors. In the first verse, she recounts an encounter with a privileged and wealthy man before revealing that she has blocked his number: "He wasn't smart or funny / I convinced myself he was". Subsequently, Rodrigo outlines her romantic non-negotiables, rejecting "passive" men and a "guy with a fake job". She also derides an ex as indecisive, which some critics believe alludes to the regrets expressed on the album's closing track, "Cigarette Smoke".

=== Chappell Roan remix ===
The remix with Roan adds a new verse and vocal ad libs to the original track. Her verse explores lesbian relationships, and some of the choruses are changed to refer to women instead of men. &Asian noted slight musical "revamps" in Roan's verse, including chiptune touches and a faster drum groove. She also sings one of the choruses, with higher-pitched harmonies by Rodrigo. Roan performs some belts in the ending, and adds a sustained soprano C (C_{6}) as well, with her ad libs peaking at the D_{6} note.

== Critical reception ==
Ranking it as the 11th-best song on You Seem Pretty Sad for a Girl in Love, Billboard's Hannah Dailey thought that it is "a fun release that comes toward the end of the album following a long run of emotional heaviness, with Rodrigo trying out blooming, grated [19]80s synths and flexing the speak-sing technique she perfected on Guts' 'Bad Idea, Right?' in the second verse". Julyssa Lopez of Rolling Stone noted that the song has an "electro-funhouse twitchiness" which "feels like it sprouted from a seed planted by the B-52s, adds another layer, keeping the listener on their toes". Alex Rigotti of NME wrote: "Thank god we have 'Expectations' to lift our spirits, which find the singer in a fit of dance-punk mania and post-breakup delusion." Tom Breihan of Stereogum described the song as a "pulsing new wave rager that's incandescent in its bitterness", with an "electro-pop bassline [that] evokes Devo and the Human League". Heven Haile of Pitchfork called the song a contender for 2026 song of the summer.

The remix featuring Roan received acclaim, with music critics praising Roan's vocal performance in particular. Pitchfork hailed it as the best new track of the week; writer Shaad D'Souza said that while he didn't believe the remix was needed, the track proved that "you should always ask for more", and opined that the "inbuilt new-wave-y-ness" of Roan's voice transformed "Expectations". Julienne Loreto of the British online magazine &Asian wrote that the remix takes the song to "greater (and gayer) heights", also complimenting the "musical chemistry" between Rodrigo and Roan. Lyndsey Havens of Billboard said that the second half of the remix is "supercharged" by Roan's "powerhouse" vocals. The remix was featured in "best of the week" curated listicles by Billboard, Mega, and Nylon.

== Music video ==
Directed by Bardia Zeinali, the music video for the "Expectations" remix stars Rodrigo and Roan as contestants in parodies of various retro game shows, such as Jeopardy!, Hollywood Squares, Wheel of Fortune, and Family Feud. Natalie Michie of W described the music video's aesthetic as "Olivia Rodrigo's pop-punk grunge meets Chappell Roan's Midwest-princess camp". Its visual style has also been associated with the 1980s. Rodrigo was styled by sisters Chloe and Chenelle Delgadillo, and Roan by Briana Andalore. Their fashion in the video paid tribute to singers who were popular in the 1980s such as Pat Benatar, Toni Basil, and Whitney Houston. Laura Molloy of Paste described the music video as "Generation Z's 'Telephone' moment"—a reference to the 2010 single by Lady Gaga and Beyoncé and its accompanying music video—while also serving as a nod to the cultural influence that both Rodrigo and Roan wield within their own generation.

David Byrne, former lead vocalist of the new wave band Talking Heads, appears as a fictional game show host named Johnny Johnson. Other appearances include drag queen Aquaria as a member of Roan's team in the Family Feud-inspired segment and animated versions of Rodrigo and Roan during the Wheel of Fortune segment; identical twins Jake and Matt Derting, who perform as glam punk duo Venus Twins, as members of Rodrigo's "mean" team; and Nigro in a special cameo. Filming took place in Astoria, Queens. An alternate music video, dubbed "Wheel of Misfortune", was released exclusively to Spotify on October 19, 2026.

== Commercial performance ==
"Expectations" debuted at number 20 on the US Billboard Hot 100 issued for June 27, 2026, and rose to number 3 that October following the release of the remix with Roan. In Canada, the song entered at number 21 on the Canadian Hot 100 during June before climbing to number 6 four months later. Elsewhere, it debuted at number 56 on the UK Singles Chart and four months later climbed to number 3. "Expectations" has reached number 2 on Australia's ARIA Charts. The song entered at number 16 in New Zealand. It opened at number 19 on the Billboard Global 200. "Expectations" also charted at number 16 in Sweden, number 4 in Singapore, and number 24 in Portugal.

== Live performances ==
"Expectations" is the last song performed by Rodrigo as part of the encore of the Unraveled Tour, which began in September 2026 and has dates until May 2027. In October 2026, Roan performed the song solo at the Super Graphic Spectacular, a benefit concert for the Midwest Princess Project.

== Track listing ==
- 7-inch vinyl, cassette, CD, download, and streaming
1. "Expectations" (featuring Chappell Roan) – 3:43
2. "Expectations" – 3:41

== Credits and personnel ==
The credits are adapted from Tidal.

- Dan Nigro – producer, composer, lyricist, engineer, bass, drum programming, synthesizer, guitar, programming, background vocals
- Mike Wise – producer, engineer, guitar, programming
- Olivia Rodrigo – vocals, background vocals, composer, lyricist
- Amy Allen – composer, lyricist
- Sterling Laws – drums
- Randy Merrill – mastering
- Mitch McCarthy – mixing
- Chappell Roan – vocals, composer, lyricist (Note: Remix only)

== Charts ==
=== Original version ===
Weekly chart performance
Chart (2026)	Peak position
Australia (ARIA)	2
Czech Republic Singles Digital (ČNS IFPI)	40
Estonia Airplay (TopHit)	83
France (SNEP)	103
Greece International (IFPI)	36
Latvia Airplay (LaIPA)	13
Netherlands (Single Top 100)	12
New Zealand (Recorded Music NZ)	6
New Zealand Airplay (RCS)	16
Panama Streaming (PRODUCE)	160
Philippines Hot 100 (Billboard Philippines)	7
Portugal (AFP)	24
Singapore (RIAS)	4
Slovakia Singles Digital (ČNS IFPI)	53
Spain (Promusicae)	75
Sweden (Sverigetopplistan)	16

=== Chappell Roan remix ===
==== Weekly charts ====
Weekly chart performance
Chart (2026)	Peak position
Argentina Hot 100 (Billboard)	45
Australia Airplay (RCS)	8
Austria (Ö3 Austria Top 40)	4
Austria Airplay (MusicTrace)	35
Belgium (Ultratop 50 Flanders)	31
Bolivia Anglo Airplay (Monitor Latino)	8
Brazil Hot 100 (Billboard)	45
Canada Hot 100 (Billboard)	6
Canada AC (Billboard)	22
Canada CHR/Top 40 (Billboard)	29
Canada Hot AC (Billboard)	26
Colombia Anglo Airplay (Monitor Latino)	7
Costa Rica Anglo Airplay (Monitor Latino)	13
Croatia (Billboard)	24
Croatia International Airplay (Top lista)	26
Estonia Airplay (TopHit)	75
Germany (GfK)	9
Germany Airplay (MusicTrace)	48
Global 200 (Billboard)	2
Greece International (IFPI)	8
Guatemala Anglo Airplay (Monitor Latino)	4
Ireland (IRMA)	2
Israel International Airplay (Media Forest)	5
Israel International TV Airplay (Media Forest)	3
Lithuania (AGATA)	43
Lithuania Airplay (TopHit)	21
Mexico Anglo Airplay (Monitor Latino)	11
Nigeria (TurnTable Top 100)	90
Norway (VG-lista)	40
Panama Streaming (PRODUCE)	88
Poland Streaming (OLiS)	43
Portugal (AFP)	8
Spain (Promusicae)	78
Switzerland (Schweizer Hitparade)	20
UK Singles (Official Charts)	3
US Billboard Hot 100	3
US Adult Pop Airplay (Billboard)	32
US Hot Rock & Alternative Songs (Billboard)	1
US Pop Airplay (Billboard)	20
Venezuela Anglo Airplay (Monitor Latino)	10

==== Monthly charts ====
Monthly chart performance
Chart (2026)	Peak position
Lithuania Airplay (TopHit)	77

== Certifications ==
Certifications
Region	Certification	Certified units/sales
Canada (Music Canada)	Gold	40,000^{‡}
New Zealand (RMNZ)	Gold	15,000^{‡}
Portugal (AFP)	Gold	12,000^{‡}
United Kingdom (BPI)	Silver	200,000^{‡}
^{‡} Sales+streaming figures based on certification alone.

== Release history ==
Release dates and formats
Region	Date	Format(s)	Label	Ref.
Various	October 15, 2026	Download; streaming	Interscope	
Various	October 16, 2026	7" vinyl; cassette; CD	Interscope	
United States	October 20, 2026	Contemporary hit radio	Interscope	
Italy	November 20, 2026	Radio airplay	EMI	
