= World Goth Day =

Annual observance on 22 May to celebrate goth culture

The World Goth Day logo

World Goth Day is an event observed annually on 22 May, defined by the World Goth Day website as "a day where the goth scene gets to celebrate its own being, and an opportunity to make its presence known to the rest of the world."

It originated in the United Kingdom in 2009 as Goth Day, a smaller scale celebration of the gothic subculture inspired from the broadcasting of a special set of shows on BBC Radio 6. These shows planned to focus on various music subcultures throughout a week of May 2009, including goth music, which was aired on 22 May.

UK-based goth DJ Lee Meadows a.k.a. DJ Cruel Britannia (currently known as BatBoy Slim) wrote a MySpace blog suggesting the idea of initiating a 'Goth Day' to a very positive reception. In 2010, he and London-based DJ martin oldgoth decided to take the concept global, both 'as a bit of fun' and to create an environment of positivity and unity within the goth community. An official website and social media presence were created with the aim of promoting the idea of a World Goth Day and to provide a comprehensive list of international events on or around the chosen date of 22 May. In early June John Holley stepped in to manage the official Facebook page and still does to this day..

World Goth Day celebrates the subcultural aspects of goth with fashion shows, art exhibitions and live performances. Many of the events feature local bands, and some have taken on a charitable aspect with events in the United Kingdom and Australia supporting favoured charities such as the UK Sophie Lancaster Foundation, which tries to curb prejudice and hatred against subcultures.
