= Maggots for Brains =

Song by Olivia Rodrigo

from the album You Seem Pretty Sad for a Girl So in Love
- Released: June 12, 2026
- Genre: Dream pop; electropop; jangle pop; new wave; post-punk
- Length: 4:00
- Label: Geffen
- Songwriters: Olivia Rodrigo; Dan Nigro; Amy Allen
- Producer: Dan Nigro

Lyric video
- "Maggots for Brains" on YouTube

"Maggots for Brains" (stylized in all lowercase) is a song by the American singer-songwriter Olivia Rodrigo from her third studio album, You Seem Pretty Sad for a Girl So in Love. It was released on June 12, 2026, by Geffen Records. Rodrigo wrote the song with Amy Allen and Dan Nigro, who also produced it. A jangle pop, electropop, new wave, and post-punk song, "Maggots for Brains" is inspired by the American rom-com television series Sex and the City (1998–2004). Its lyrics compare a narrator's state of lovesickness to having a rotten brain – being unable to function without her lover.

== Background ==
In March 2026, Olivia Rodrigo described the thematic direction of her third studio album in an interview with British Vogue. She stated that the album predominantly features "sad love songs", explaining that many of her favorite romantic tracks derive their appeal from an undercurrent of fear or longing. The album takes inspiration from Rodrigo's time in London. Multiple tracks on the album are said to reference the relationship of Sex and the City characters Miranda Hobbes and Steve Brady. On April 2, 2026, the album title was unveiled after being painted on a pink wall in Los Angeles and hinted with the final word in the album title in many cities. Rodrigo continued her collaboration with Dan Nigro, who returned to be the album's producer. Rodrigo released "Drop Dead" as the lead single on April 17, 2026. A second song from the album, called "Begged", was performed on Saturday Night Live on May 2, 2026.

Speaking of the album's conception and the influence of Sex and the City on the tracks, Rodrigo stated: "Like, when Miranda and Steve are getting back together, she's crying. 'Steve, anytime something funny happens, I just want to tell you.' And I remember watching that and being like, 'Oh, my God, I have to write a song about this.'" Out of the thirteen tracks for You Seem Pretty Sad for a Girl So in Love, "Maggots for Brains" appears as the fourth.

On June 25th, 2026, "Maggots For Brains" was added as a Jam Track to Fortnite Festival, along with "Drop Dead" and "Deja Vu", as part of Rodrigo's collaboration with Fortnite. An emote was also added for the track.

== Composition ==
At four minutes long, "Maggots for Brains" is a dream pop, jangle pop, electropop, new wave, and post-punk tune featuring synthesizers and new wave tones. Critics found the production reminiscent of the English bands New Order and the Cure, British band Siouxsie and the Banshees, and Canadian pop band Alvvays.

"Maggots for Brains" is interchangeably titled after the English idiom, "worms for brains". Rodrigo first teased the song through a shirt embroided with the lyric "I'm a zombie in my body" at Lollapalooza in August 1, 2025, in Chicago. The track features morbid imagery, such as zombies, maggots and decomposition. Lyrically, it is inspired by the American romantic comedy television, Sex and the City (1998–2004) – particularly the character Miranda Hobbes. In "Maggots for Brains", Rodrigo narrates her feeling of lovesickness without her lover – comparing this feeling to having worms in her brain and describing herself as a zombie.

== Critical reception ==
Hannah Dailey of Billboard ranked it at the bottom of the tracklist of You Seem Pretty Sad for a Girl So in Love, describing it as "a punky banger full of simple metaphors and icky imagery — the title included", and adding: "This one feels more like Rodrigo just stepping up to the mic and ranting, letting her angst pour out of her and sounding better than ever as a pop-rock vocalist." Julyssa Lopez of Rolling Stone described the song as "a mopey synth party" and "a snapshot of the yearning and neediness that takes over when there's distance from the person she loves". Alex Rigotti of NME called the song an "excellent New Order ode". Dazed picked it as the album's best song.

== Commercial performance ==
"Maggots for Brains" debuted at number 12 on the US Billboard Hot 100 issued for June 27, 2026. In Canada, the song entered at number 11 on the Canadian Hot 100 on the chart for the same date. In the United Kingdom, it debuted at number 10 on the Official Audio Streaming Chart. In Australia, "Maggots for Brains" debuted at number nine. The song entered at number 13 in New Zealand. It debuted at number eight on the Billboard Global 200. "Maggots for Brains" also charted at number 1 on Sweden Heatseeker, number 9 in Singapore, number 16 in Portugal, number 22 in Hong Kong, number 58 in Germany, and number 75 on the Brasil Hot 100.

== Credits and personnel ==
These credits have been adapted from Tidal.

- Olivia Rodrigo – composer, lyricist, vocals, background vocals
- Dan Nigro – producer, composer, lyricist, acoustic guitar, bass, background vocals, drum programming, engineer, guitar, programming
- Amy Allen – composer, lyricist
- Michael Harris – additional engineering
- Lily Elise – background vocals
- Ben Romans – CP-70, piano
- Sterling Laws – drums
- Chris Kasych – engineer
- Randy Merrill – mastering engineer
- Mitch McCarthy – mixing

== Charts ==
Chart positions for "Maggots for Brains"
Chart (2026)	Peak position
Argentina Hot 100 (Billboard)	74
Australia (ARIA)	9
Brazil Hot 100 (Billboard)	75
Canada Hot 100 (Billboard)	11
France (SNEP)	155
Germany (GfK)	58
Greece International (IFPI)	28
Global 200 (Billboard)	8
Hong Kong (Billboard)	22
New Zealand (Recorded Music NZ)	13
Panama Streaming (PRODUCE)	107
Philippines Hot 100 (Billboard Philippines)	20
Portugal (AFP)	16
Singapore (RIAS)	9
Spain (Promusicae)	55
Sweden Heatseeker (Sverigetopplistan)	1
UK Streaming (OCC)	10
US Billboard Hot 100	12
US Hot Rock & Alternative Songs (Billboard)	2

== Certifications ==
Certifications
Region	Certification	Certified units/sales
Canada (Music Canada)	Platinum	80,000^{‡}
United Kingdom (BPI)	Silver	200,000^{‡}
^{‡} Sales+streaming figures based on certification alone.
