= Begged (song) =

2026 single by Olivia Rodrigo

Song by Olivia Rodrigo

from the album You Seem Pretty Sad for a Girl So in Love
- Released: June 12, 2026
- Genre: Folk; acoustic pop; indie pop
- Length: 3:37
- Label: Geffen
- Songwriter: Olivia Rodrigo
- Producer: Dan Nigro

Audio video
- "Begged" on YouTube

"Begged" (stylized in all lowercase) is a song by American singer-songwriter Olivia Rodrigo from her third studio album, You Seem Pretty Sad for a Girl So in Love (2026). Rodrigo premiered the song prior to the album's release during her appearance on Saturday Night Live on May 2, 2026, following the release of the lead single, "Drop Dead".

== Background ==
In March 2026, Olivia Rodrigo described the thematic direction of her then-unannounced third studio album in an interview with British Vogue. She stated that the album predominantly features "sad love songs", explaining that many of her favorite romantic tracks derive their appeal from an undercurrent of fear or longing. On April 2, 2026, the album title was unveiled after being painted on a pink wall in Los Angeles and hinted with the final word in the album title in various cities. Rodrigo continued her collaboration with Dan Nigro, who returned as the album's producer. Rodrigo released "Drop Dead" as the lead single on April 17, 2026.

Later in the month, Rodrigo began teasing the second single from the album in an interview with Audacy Music, stating: "The next single is karaokeable if you're sad a little bit." In an invite-only show with a no-phones policy at the Echo in Los Angeles on April 24, 2026, Rodrigo premiered a new song, featuring American singer Weyes Blood. Stereogum reported that this "appear[ed] to be the next single", with fans describing it as "a 'heartbreaking ballad' where she's 'yearning and begging someone to stay'". In an appearance on the Tonight Show Starring Jimmy Fallon, however, she confirmed that she will debut "a brand new [song] that no one has heard" while hosting and performing on Saturday Night Live on May 2, 2026. She subsequently premiered a ballad entitled "Begged"; the same song first performed at the Echo.

== Composition ==
"Begged" is 3 minutes and 37 seconds long. Nigro produced, engineered, programmed, and mixed the song. Nigro played acoustic guitar, bass, and organ, and Ryan Linvill played the saxophone. Randy Merrill mastered the song. "Begged" is a restrained and melancholic folk, acoustic pop, and indie pop ballad exploring the themes of yearning and uncertainty, with Rodrigo taking an intimate tone. Deadline Hollywood's Natalie Oganesyan noted that "Begged" was "stripped down and more somber in tone" than the "uproarious and scathing 'Drop Dead'". The former includes the lyrics "I could never leave / so I'm patient, you're learning / pretend it's not hurting" and "'Cause they say it's a virtue / to not let good love slip away." Rodrigo goes on to wish for her partner's loyalty and to spend time with him: "All that I want is to know undoubtedly that you just have eyes for me [...] All that I want is to sit here silently and watch movies on TV."

== Critical reception ==
Billboard's Hannah Dailey ranked "Begged" as the eighth-best track on the album, stating: "The lyrics are just that devastatingly relatable, with Rodrigo capturing the excruciating but pivotal moment in a relationship where one must decide to either give up on asking your partner for what you need or leave in pursuit of someone else who can actually give it to you." Alexis Petridis of the Guardian wrote that in "Begged", "the moment you realise a relationship is doomed but doggedly refuse to act on it" is "drawn with queasy relatability". Rolling Stone questioned the placement of "Begged" on the album's tracklist, stating: "The balladry of 'The Cure' and 'Begged' keep her turning the lens inward, though they threaten the momentum of the album."

== Live performance ==
Prior to its release, "Begged" was premiered on May 2, 2026, when Rodrigo performed on Saturday Night Live. Connor Storrie introduced the performance. It was Rodrigo's second performance of the night, following "Drop Dead". Rodrigo performed while seated on a swing, paying homage to You Seem Pretty Sad for a Girl So in Love's album artwork. Weyes Blood accompanied Rodrigo on background vocals.

== Credits and personnel ==
Credits adapted from the liner notes of You Seem Pretty Sad for a Girl So in Love.

- Olivia Rodrigo – vocals, background vocals, songwriter
- Dan Nigro – producer, engineer, acoustic guitar, bass, organ, programming, mixing, background vocals
- Ryan Linvill – saxophone
- Randy Merrill – mastering

== Charts ==
Chart performance
Chart (2026)	Peak position
Australia (ARIA)	10
Canada Hot 100 (Billboard)	15
Global 200 (Billboard)	12
Greece International (IFPI)	37
Malaysia (Billboard)	25
New Zealand (Recorded Music NZ)	10
Philippines (IFPI)	19
Philippines Hot 100 (Billboard Philippines)	17
Portugal (AFP)	21
Singapore (RIAS)	12
Spain (Promusicae)	88
Sweden Heatseeker (Sverigetopplistan)	6
UK Streaming (OCC)	18
US Billboard Hot 100	16

== Certifications ==
Certifications
Region	Certification	Certified units/sales
Canada (Music Canada)	Gold	40,000^{‡}
^{‡} Sales+streaming figures based on certification alone.
