= List of songs recorded by Olivia Rodrigo =

Songs by American singer-songwriter

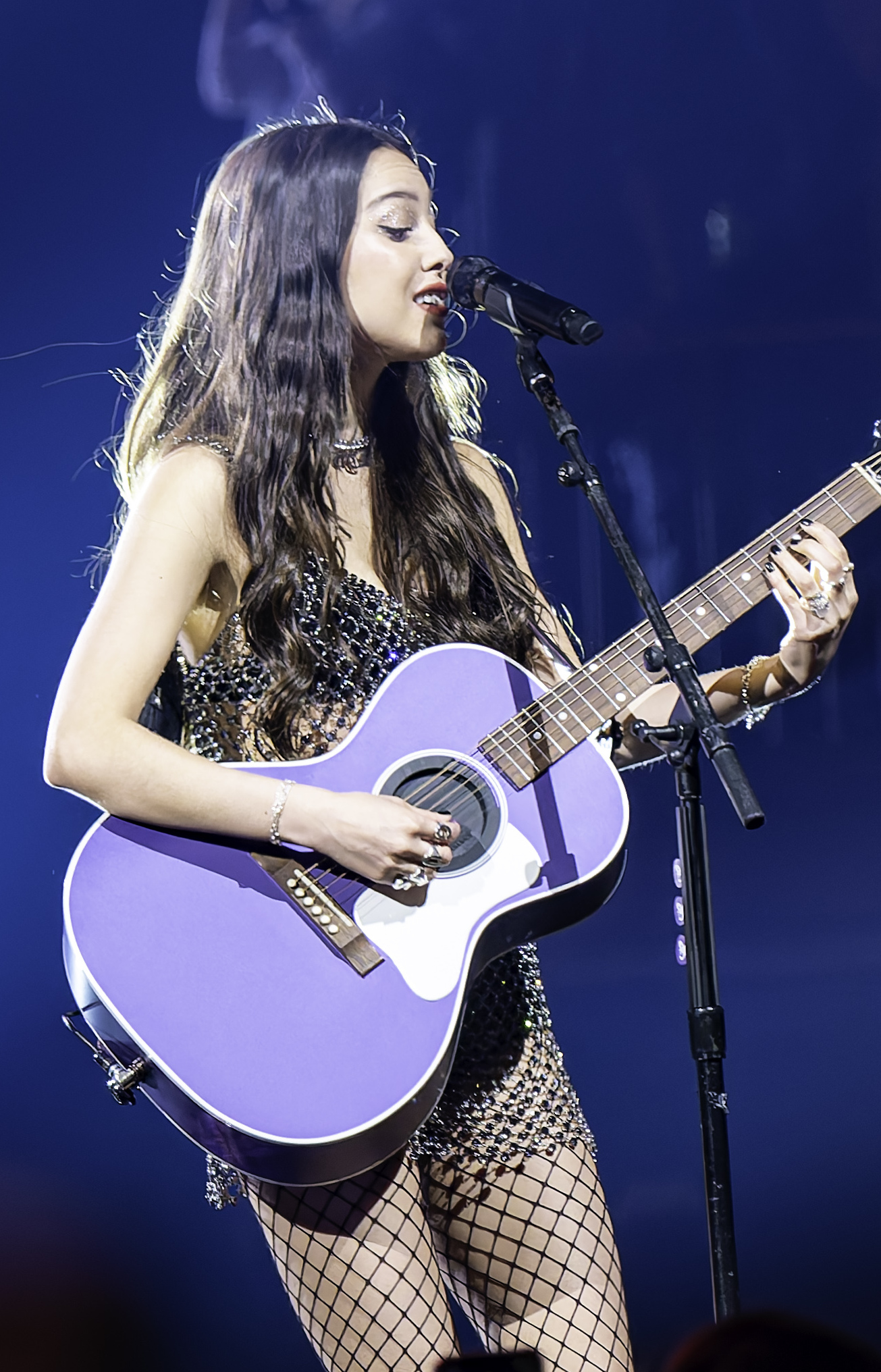
Rodrigo performing with a purple guitar, an instrument frequently used in Rodrigo's music.

American singer-songwriter Olivia Rodrigo has recorded songs for three studio albums. She became interested in music from a young age, taking vocal lessons in kindergarten and singing classes at age six. In 2016, Rodrigo and Madison Hu, who co-starred in the television series Bizaardvark, recorded four original songs for its soundtrack EP. Three years later, she starred in High School Musical: The Musical: The Series. She contributed several songs to its soundtracks, including the solo-written "All I Want" (2019), "The Rose Song" (2021), and a cover of Joni Mitchell's "River".

In early 2020, Rodrigo began meeting with record labels and subsequently signed with Geffen Records and Interscope Records, intending to release her debut EP in 2021. She wrote material with American producer Dan Nigro, including the song "Drivers License", which was released as her debut single in January 2021 and experienced commercial success. Nigro produced all eleven tracks on Rodrigo's debut studio album, Sour (2021), a pop, pop-punk, alternative-pop, and bedroom-pop album. They continued working together on her second studio album, Guts (2023), which features twelve tracks. It was preceded by the pop-rock single "Vampire" (2023). The album was conceived when Rodrigo was 19 years old, a year she described as "lots of confusion, mistakes, awkwardness & good old fashioned teen angst". In November, Rodrigo released the song "Can't Catch Me Now" (2023) for The Hunger Games: The Ballad of Songbirds & Snakes.

Rodrigo's third studio album, You Seem Pretty Sad for a Girl So in Love (2026), also featured Nigro as her primary collaborator with songwriting contributions by Amy Allen, among others. The indie and pop album was preceded by the synth-pop single "Drop Dead" and the indie rock and pop track "The Cure".

== Released songs ==
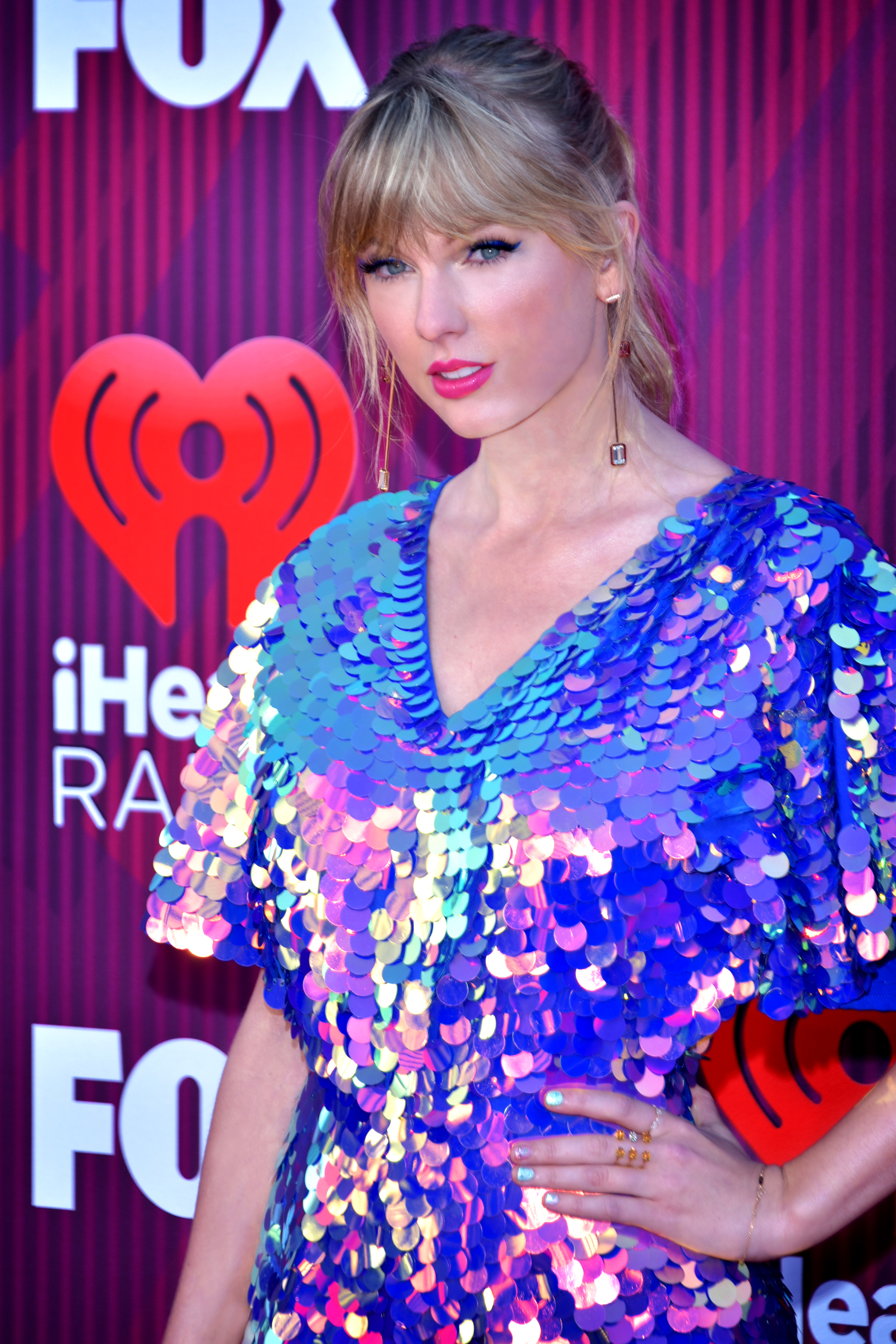
Rodrigo's songs "1 Step Forward, 3 Steps Back" and "Deja Vu" interpolate Taylor Swift.

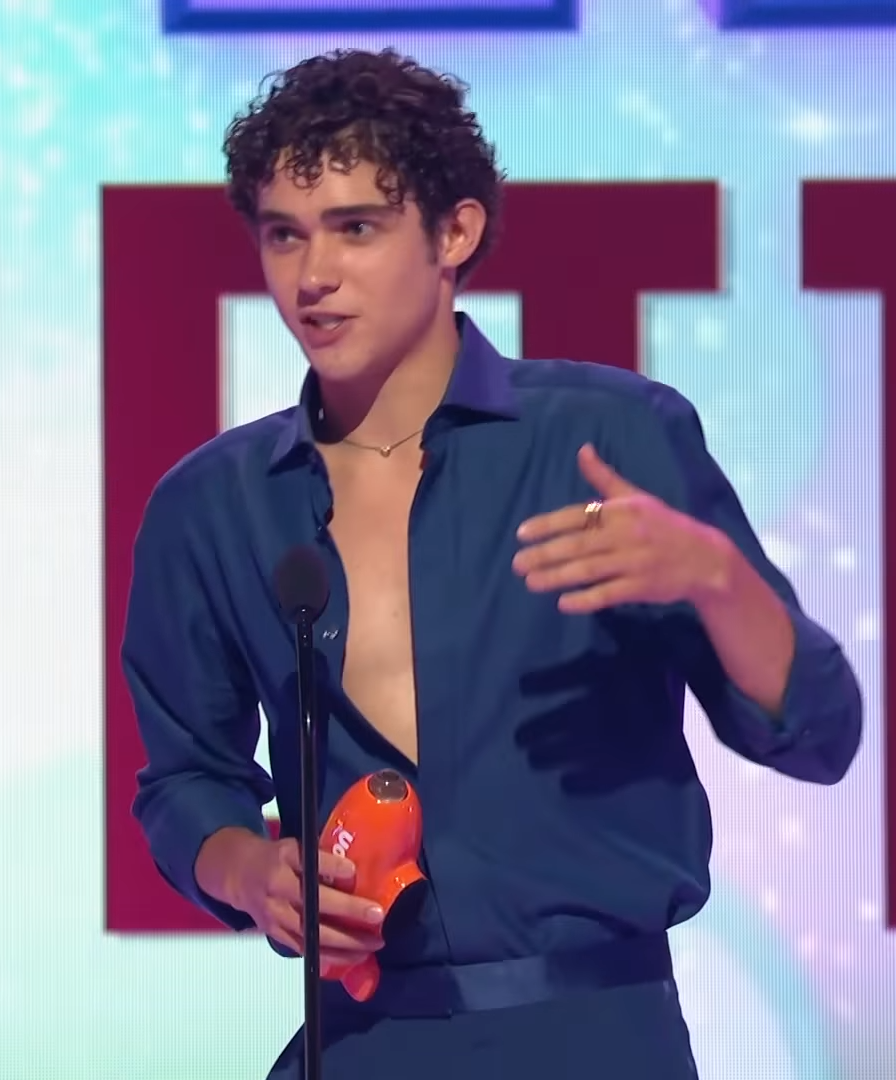
Rodrigo has recorded several songs as duets with Joshua Bassett for film soundtracks.

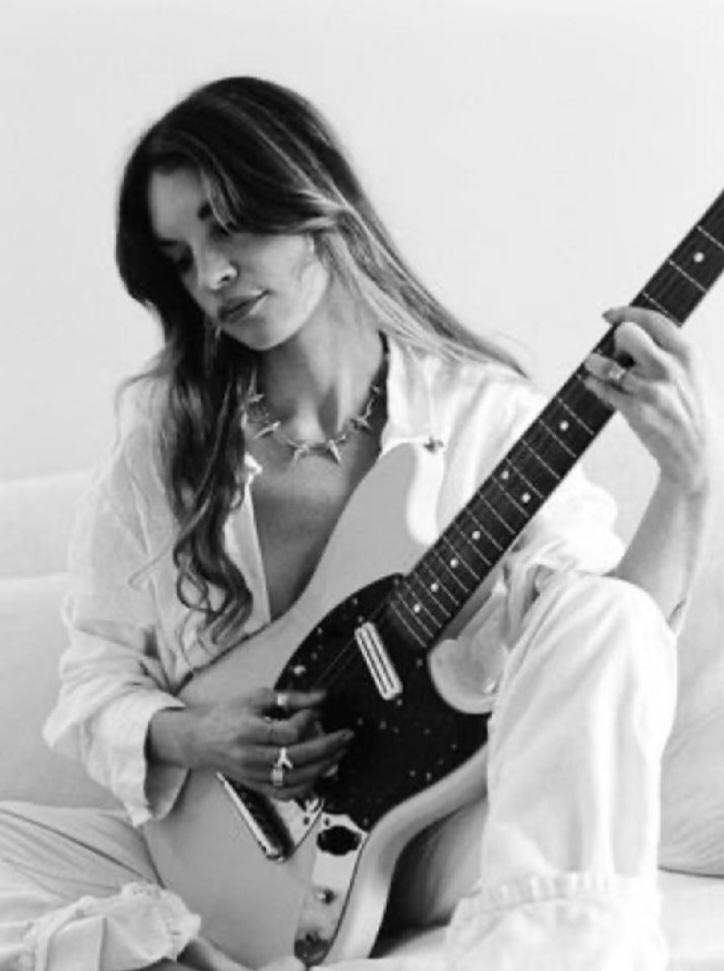
Amy Allen served as a co-writer on "Pretty Isn't Pretty" and several songs on You Seem Pretty Sad for a Girl So in Love.

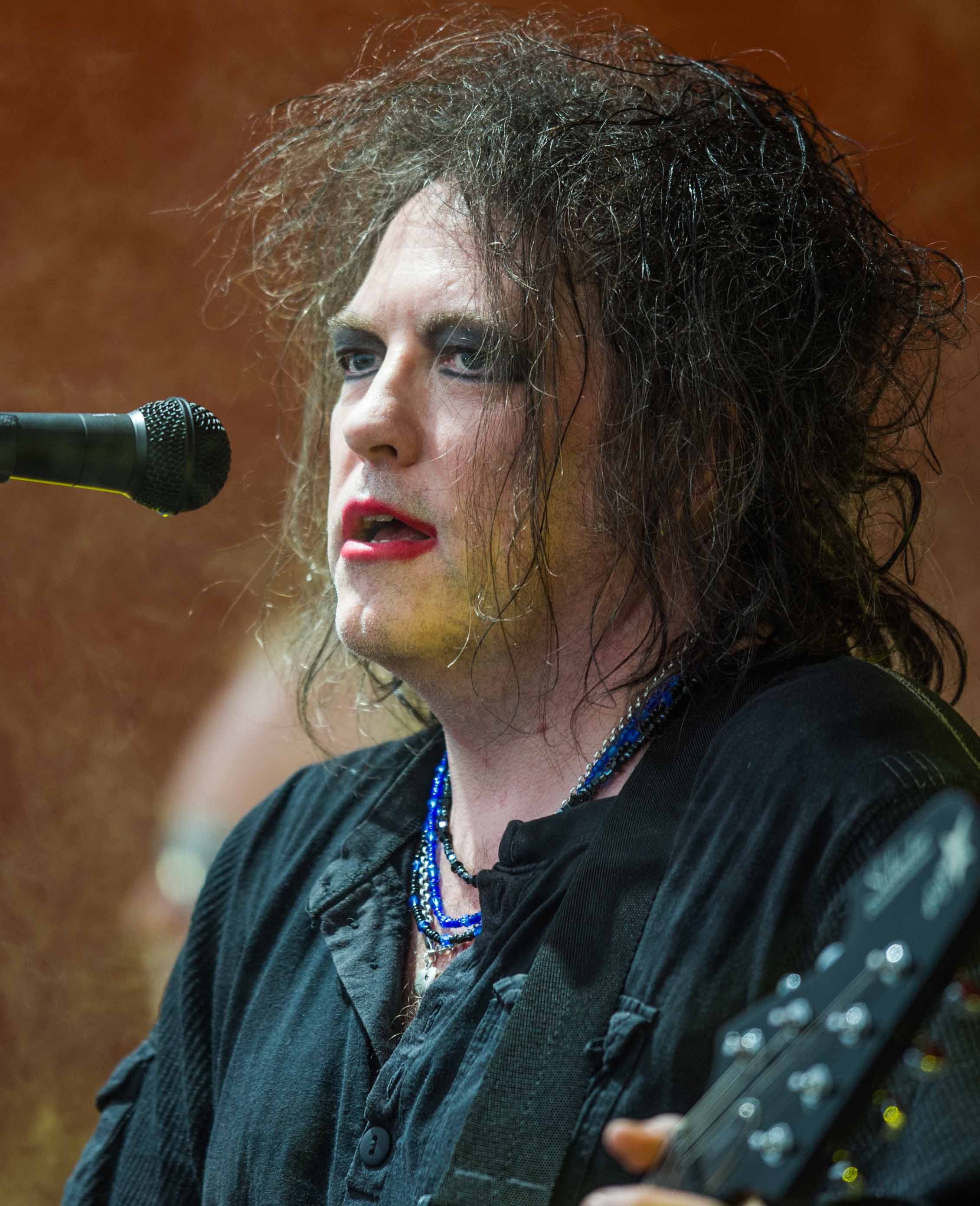
Rodrigo and Robert Smith have collaborated multiple times.

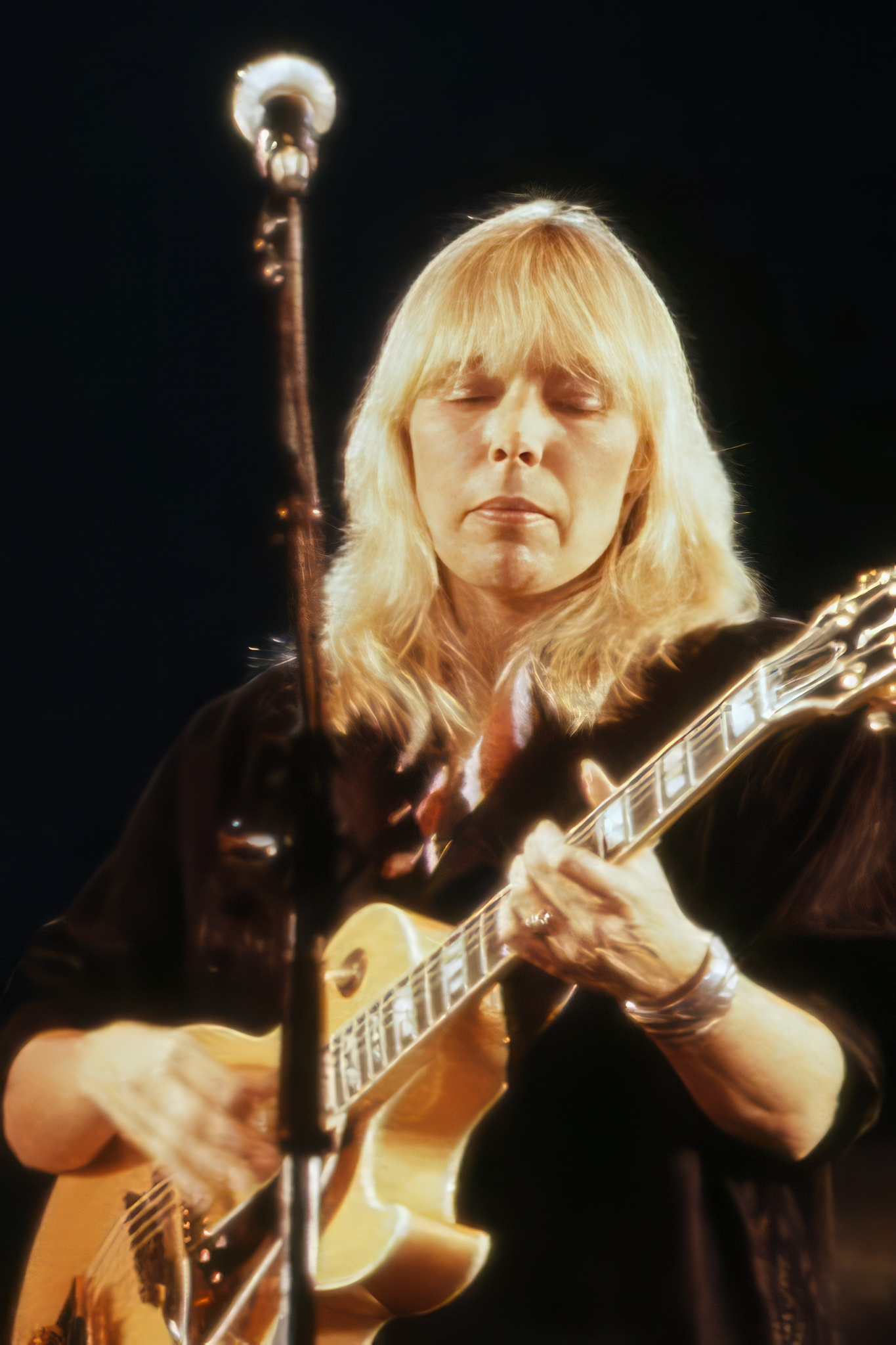
Rodrigo covered "River", written by Joni Mitchell.

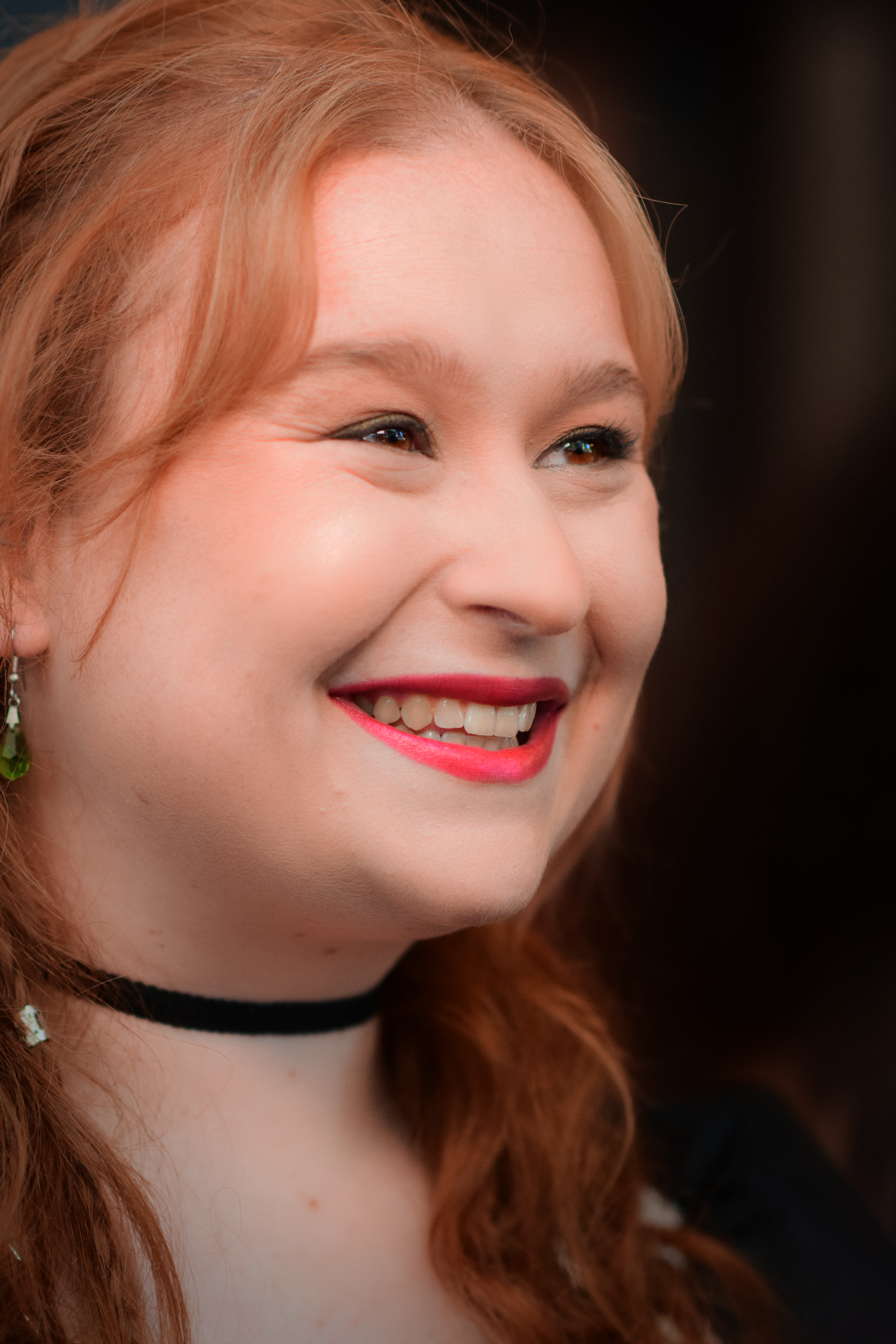
Rodrigo recorded "Wondering" as a duet with Julia Lester.

Key
| ‡ | Indicates songs written solely by Olivia Rodrigo |

Name of song, featured performers, writer(s), original release, and year of release
| Title | Artist(s) | Writer(s) | Original release | Year | Ref. |
|---|---|---|---|---|---|
| "1 Step Forward, 3 Steps Back" | Olivia Rodrigo | Olivia Rodrigo; Taylor Swift; Jack Antonoff | Sour | 2021 | |
| "All-American Bitch" | Olivia Rodrigo | Olivia Rodrigo; Dan Nigro | Guts | 2023 | |
| "All I Want" | Olivia Rodrigo | Olivia Rodrigo ‡ | High School Musical: The Musical: The Series: The Soundtrack | 2020 | |
| "Bad Idea Right?" | Olivia Rodrigo | Olivia Rodrigo; Dan Nigro | Guts | 2023 | |
| "Ballad of a Homeschooled Girl" | Olivia Rodrigo | Olivia Rodrigo; Dan Nigro | Guts | 2023 | |
| "Begged" | Olivia Rodrigo | Olivia Rodrigo ‡ | You Seem Pretty Sad for a Girl So in Love | 2026 | |
| "The Best Part" | Olivia Rodrigo and Joshua Bassett | Chantry Johnson; Michelle Zarlenga; Mitch Allan | High School Musical: The Musical: The Series: The Soundtrack: Season 2 | 2021 | |
| "Bizaardvark Theme Song" | Olivia Rodrigo and Madison Hu | Josh Lehrman; Kyle Stegina; Matthew Tishler | Bizaardvark (Music from the TV Series) | 2016 | |
| "Blobfish" | Olivia Rodrigo and Madison Hu | Josh Lehrman; Kyle Stegina; Scott Clausen | Bizaardvark (Music from the TV Series) | 2016 | |
| "The Book of Love" (cover) | Olivia Rodrigo | Stephin Merritt | Help(2) | 2026 | |
| "Bop to the Top" | Olivia Rodrigo and Dara Reneé | Kevin Quinn; Randy Petersen | High School Musical: The Musical: The Series: The Soundtrack | 2020 | |
| "Breaking Free" (cover) | Olivia Rodrigo, Joshua Bassett and Matt Cornett | Jamie Houston | High School Musical: The Musical: The Series: The Soundtrack | 2020 | |
| "Brutal" | Olivia Rodrigo | Olivia Rodrigo; Dan Nigro | Sour | 2021 | |
| "Can't Catch Me Now" | Olivia Rodrigo | Olivia Rodrigo; Dan Nigro | The Hunger Games: The Ballad of Songbirds & Snakes Soundtrack | 2023 | |
| "Cigarette Smoke" | Olivia Rodrigo | Olivia Rodrigo; Dan Nigro | You Seem Pretty Sad for a Girl So in Love | 2026 | |
| "The Comeback Song" | Olivia Rodrigo and Madison Hu | Matthew Tishler; Andrew Underberg | Bizaardvark (Music from the TV Series) | 2016 | |
| "The Cure" | Olivia Rodrigo | Olivia Rodrigo; Dan Nigro | You Seem Pretty Sad for a Girl So in Love | 2026 | |
| "Deja Vu" | Olivia Rodrigo | Olivia Rodrigo; Dan Nigro; Taylor Swift; Jack Antonoff; Annie Clark | Sour | 2021 | |
| "Drivers License" | Olivia Rodrigo | Olivia Rodrigo; Dan Nigro | Sour | 2021 | |
| "Drop Dead" | Olivia Rodrigo | Olivia Rodrigo; Dan Nigro; Amy Allen | You Seem Pretty Sad for a Girl So in Love | 2026 | |
| "Enough for You" | Olivia Rodrigo | Olivia Rodrigo ‡ | Sour | 2021 | |
| "Even When/The Best Part" | Olivia Rodrigo and Joshua Bassett | Chantry Johnson; Michelle Zarlenga; Mitch Allan | High School Musical: The Musical: The Series: The Soundtrack: Season 2 | 2021 | |
| "Expectations" | Olivia Rodrigo | Olivia Rodrigo; Dan Nigro; Amy Allen | You Seem Pretty Sad for a Girl So in Love | 2026 | |
| "Favorite Crime" | Olivia Rodrigo | Olivia Rodrigo; Dan Nigro | Sour | 2021 | |
| "Friday I'm in Love" (cover) | Olivia Rodrigo and Robert Smith | Perry Bamonte; Boris Williams; Simon Gallup; Robert Smith; Porl Thompson | Live from Glastonbury (A BBC Recording) | 2025 | |
| "Get Him Back!" | Olivia Rodrigo | Olivia Rodrigo; Dan Nigro | Guts | 2023 | |
| "Girl I've Always Been" | Olivia Rodrigo | Olivia Rodrigo ‡ | Guts (Spilled) | 2023 | |
| "Good 4 U" | Olivia Rodrigo | Olivia Rodrigo; Dan Nigro; Hayley Williams; Josh Farro | Sour | 2021 | |
| "Granted" | Olivia Rodrigo | Jordan Powers; Josh Cumbee | High School Musical: The Musical: The Series: The Soundtrack: Season 2 | 2021 | |
| "The Grudge" | Olivia Rodrigo | Olivia Rodrigo; Dan Nigro | Guts | 2023 | |
| "Happier" | Olivia Rodrigo | Olivia Rodrigo ‡ | Sour | 2021 | |
| "Honeybee" | Olivia Rodrigo | Olivia Rodrigo ‡ | You Seem Pretty Sad for a Girl So in Love | 2026 | |
| "Hope Ur Ok" | Olivia Rodrigo | Olivia Rodrigo; Dan Nigro | Sour | 2021 | |
| "I Think I Kinda, You Know" | Olivia Rodrigo | Alan Zachary; Michael Weiner | High School Musical: The Musical: The Series: The Soundtrack | 2020 | |
| "Jealousy, Jealousy" | Olivia Rodrigo | Olivia Rodrigo; Dan Nigro; Casey Smith | Sour | 2021 | |
| "Just for a Moment" | Olivia Rodrigo and Joshua Bassett | Dan Book; Joshua Bassett; Olivia Rodrigo | High School Musical: The Musical: The Series: The Soundtrack | 2020 | |
| "Just like Heaven" (cover) | Olivia Rodrigo and Robert Smith | Robert Smith; Simon Gallup; Porl Thompson; Boris Williams; Lol Tolhurst | Live from Glastonbury (A BBC Recording) | 2025 | |
| "Lacy" | Olivia Rodrigo | Olivia Rodrigo; Dan Nigro | Guts | 2023 | |
| "Less" | Olivia Rodrigo | Olivia Rodrigo; Dan Nigro; Amy Allen | You Seem Pretty Sad for a Girl So in Love | 2026 | |
| "Logical" | Olivia Rodrigo | Olivia Rodrigo; Dan Nigro; Julia Michaels | Guts | 2023 | |
| "Love Is Embarrassing" | Olivia Rodrigo | Olivia Rodrigo; Dan Nigro | Guts | 2023 | |
| "Love the Haters" | Olivia Rodrigo and Madison Hu | Eric Friedman; Josh Lehrman; Kyle Stegina; Randy Petersen | Bizaardvark (Music from the TV Series) | 2016 | |
| "Maggots for Brains" | Olivia Rodrigo | Olivia Rodrigo; Dan Nigro; Amy Allen | You Seem Pretty Sad for a Girl So in Love | 2026 | |
| "Making the Bed" | Olivia Rodrigo | Olivia Rodrigo; Dan Nigro | Guts | 2023 | |
| "Miss This Christmas" | Olivia Rodrigo | Olivia Rodrigo; Dan Nigro | | 2026 | |
| "My Way" | Olivia Rodrigo | Olivia Rodrigo; Dan Nigro; Steph Jones | You Seem Pretty Sad for a Girl So in Love | 2026 | |
| "Never Do" | Olivia Rodrigo | Olivia Rodrigo ‡ | You Seem Pretty Sad for a Girl So in Love (With a Bonus Track) | 2026 | |
| "Obsessed" | Olivia Rodrigo | Olivia Rodrigo; Dan Nigro; Annie Clark | Guts (Spilled) | 2023 | |
| "Out of the Old" | Olivia Rodrigo | Jordan Powers; Josh Cumbee | High School Musical: The Musical: The Series: The Soundtrack | 2020 | |
| "Pretty Isn't Pretty" | Olivia Rodrigo | Olivia Rodrigo; Dan Nigro; Amy Allen | Guts | 2023 | |
| "Purple" | Olivia Rodrigo | Olivia Rodrigo; Dan Nigro; Amy Allen | You Seem Pretty Sad for a Girl So in Love | 2026 | |
| "River" (cover) | Olivia Rodrigo | Joni Mitchell | High School Musical: The Musical: The Holiday Special: The Soundtrack | 2020 | |
| "The Rose Song" | Olivia Rodrigo | Olivia Rodrigo ‡ | High School Musical: The Musical: The Series: The Soundtrack: Season 2 | 2021 | |
| "Scared of My Guitar" | Olivia Rodrigo | Olivia Rodrigo; Dan Nigro | Guts (Spilled) | 2023 | |
| "Serena Joy" | Olivia Rodrigo | Olivia Rodrigo; Dan Nigro | | 2026 | |
| "So American" | Olivia Rodrigo | Olivia Rodrigo; Dan Nigro | Guts (Spilled) | 2024 | |
| "Start of Something New" | Olivia Rodrigo | Matthew Gerrard; Robert Nevil | High School Musical: The Musical: The Series: The Soundtrack | 2020 | |
| "Stranger" | Olivia Rodrigo | Olivia Rodrigo ‡ | Guts (Spilled) | 2023 | |
| "Stupid Song" | Olivia Rodrigo | Olivia Rodrigo; Dan Nigro | You Seem Pretty Sad for a Girl So in Love | 2026 | |
| "Take Me Home (4 Christmas)" | Olivia Rodrigo | Olivia Rodrigo; Dan Nigro; Amy Allen | | 2026 | |
| "Teenage Dream" | Olivia Rodrigo | Olivia Rodrigo; Dan Nigro | Guts | 2023 | |
| "Traitor" | Olivia Rodrigo | Olivia Rodrigo; Dan Nigro | Sour | 2021 | |
| "U + Me = <3" | Olivia Rodrigo | Olivia Rodrigo; Dan Nigro | You Seem Pretty Sad for a Girl So in Love | 2026 | |
| "Vampire" | Olivia Rodrigo | Olivia Rodrigo; Dan Nigro | Guts | 2023 | |
| "What I’ve Been Looking For" | Olivia Rodrigo and Matt Cornett | Adam Watts; Andy Dodd | High School Musical: The Musical: The Series: The Soundtrack | 2020 | |
| "What's Wrong with Me" | Olivia Rodrigo and Robert Smith | Olivia Rodrigo; Dan Nigro; Sasha Alex Sloan | You Seem Pretty Sad for a Girl So in Love | 2026 | |
| "Wondering" | Olivia Rodrigo and Julia Lester | Jordan Powers; Josh Cumbee | High School Musical: The Musical: The Series: The Soundtrack | 2020 | |
| "YAC Alma Mater" | Olivia Rodrigo | Gabriel Mann; Jeannie Lurie | High School Musical: The Musical: The Series: The Soundtrack: Season 2 | 2021 | |
| "You Never Know" | Olivia Rodrigo | Chantry Johnson; Michelle Zarlenga; Mitch Allan | High School Musical: The Musical: The Series: The Soundtrack: Season 3 | 2022 | |

== Unreleased songs ==
Name of song and writers ordered in year written.
| Song | Writer(s) | Notes | Ref. |
|---|---|---|---|
| "The Bels" | Olivia Rodrigo | Written by Rodrigo at age 5; Rodrigo released the full version to fans via her newsletter in December 2022 | |
| "Superman" | Olivia Rodrigo | Written by Rodrigo at age 9 or 10; Rodrigo claims the song was the first she wrote on piano | |
| "Crying in the Parking Lot" | Olivia Rodrigo; Dan Nigro | The first song Rodrigo wrote with Nigro; Sample featured in Driving Home 2 U | |
| "Baby Is You" | Olivia Rodrigo; Dan Nigro | Featured in the end credits of Driving Home 2 U | |
| "Do Better" | Unknown | Leaked online in April 2023; It is unknown when exactly the song was written; fans have theorised it to be a Sour outtake | |
| "The Ones I Love" | Unknown | Leaked online in March 2022 with "Strange" | |
| "Strange" | Unknown | Leaked online in April 2022 | |
| "Prison For Life" | Unknown | Leaked online in October 3rd 2023 | |
