= So American =

2024 song by Olivia Rodrigo

Song by Olivia Rodrigo

from the album Guts (Spilled)
- Released: March 22, 2024
- Studio: Amusement (Los Angeles, CA); EastWest (Los Angeles, CA)
- Genre: New wave; pop rock; rock and roll; synth-pop
- Length: 2:49
- Label: Geffen
- Songwriters: Olivia Rodrigo; Dan Nigro
- Producer: Dan Nigro

Lyric video
- "So American" on YouTube

"So American" (stylized in all lowercase) is a song by American singer-songwriter Olivia Rodrigo from Guts (Spilled), the 2024 deluxe edition of her second studio album, Guts (2023). Rodrigo wrote the song with its producer, Dan Nigro. It became available as the deluxe edition's 17th track on March 22, 2024, when it was released by Geffen Records. Musically new wave, pop rock, rock and roll, and synth-pop, "So American" was considered by publications as the first love song in Rodrigo's discography. It features her dating a non-American man and praising him.

Music critics thought "So American" was successful as a love song and found its optimistic take on love a refreshing change for Rodrigo. In the United States, the song debuted at number 58 on the Billboard Hot 100. It also reached the charts in Australia, Canada, Ireland, and the United Kingdom. Rodrigo included "So American" on the set lists of the Guts World Tour (2024–2025) and the Unraveled Tour (2026–2027).

== Background and release ==
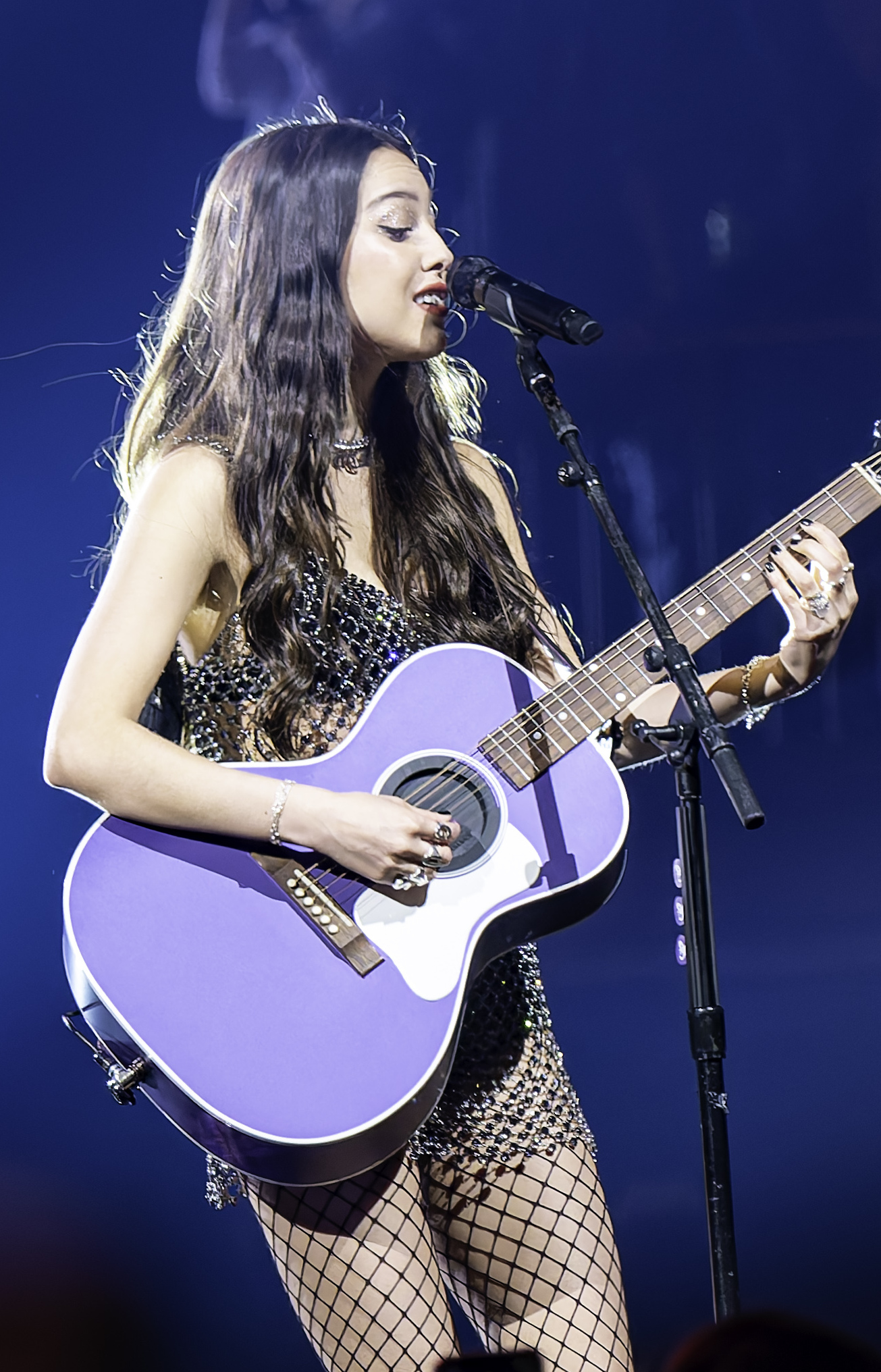
Olivia Rodrigo performing on the Guts World Tour in May 2024

Olivia Rodrigo conceived her second studio album, Guts (2023), at the age of 19, while experiencing "lots of confusion, mistakes, awkwardness & good old fashioned teen angst". Dan Nigro produced every single track on it. They wrote over 100 songs, of which Rodrigo included the more rock-oriented tracks on the album because they drew a bigger reaction from her audiences during live shows. 12 of the 25 songs recorded made it onto the standard edition of Guts. Rodrigo excluded some of them to not overpower the tracklist with too many similar songs and believed they would be released at some point in the future.

Guts was released to critical acclaim in September 2023. Later in the year, Rodrigo began dating English actor Louis Partridge. During the first Chicago show of her Guts World Tour in March 2024, Rodrigo announced that the album's deluxe edition, Guts (Spilled), would be released on March 22, confirming that a new song called "So American" would be included on it. Written by Rodrigo and Nigro, "So American" was the only bonus track recorded after the original album's release.

In an Instagram story, Rodrigo identified "So American" as her favorite one among the new tracks and added three winking emojis. She posted a clip of her performing the song on an acoustic guitar on TikTok. After the release of "So American", the song was added to the set list of the Guts World Tour between "Lacy" (2023) and "Jealousy, Jealousy" (2021). Rodrigo changed the last lyric on the song's bridge: "Think I'm in love" to "'Cause I'm in love" during a show where Partridge was in attendance. Rodrigo reprised it during her Lollapalooza Chile set in March 2025.

== Composition ==
"So American" is 2 minutes and 49 seconds long. Nigro produced the song, and Randy Merrill mastered it. It is a new wave, pop, rock and roll, pop rock, synth-pop, and rock song. An uptempo track that was described as "energetic" by NME's Tom Skinner, "So American" employs a bassline, punchy and fuzzy guitar, and neon-tinged keyboards reminiscent of classic new wave tracks in its instrumentation.

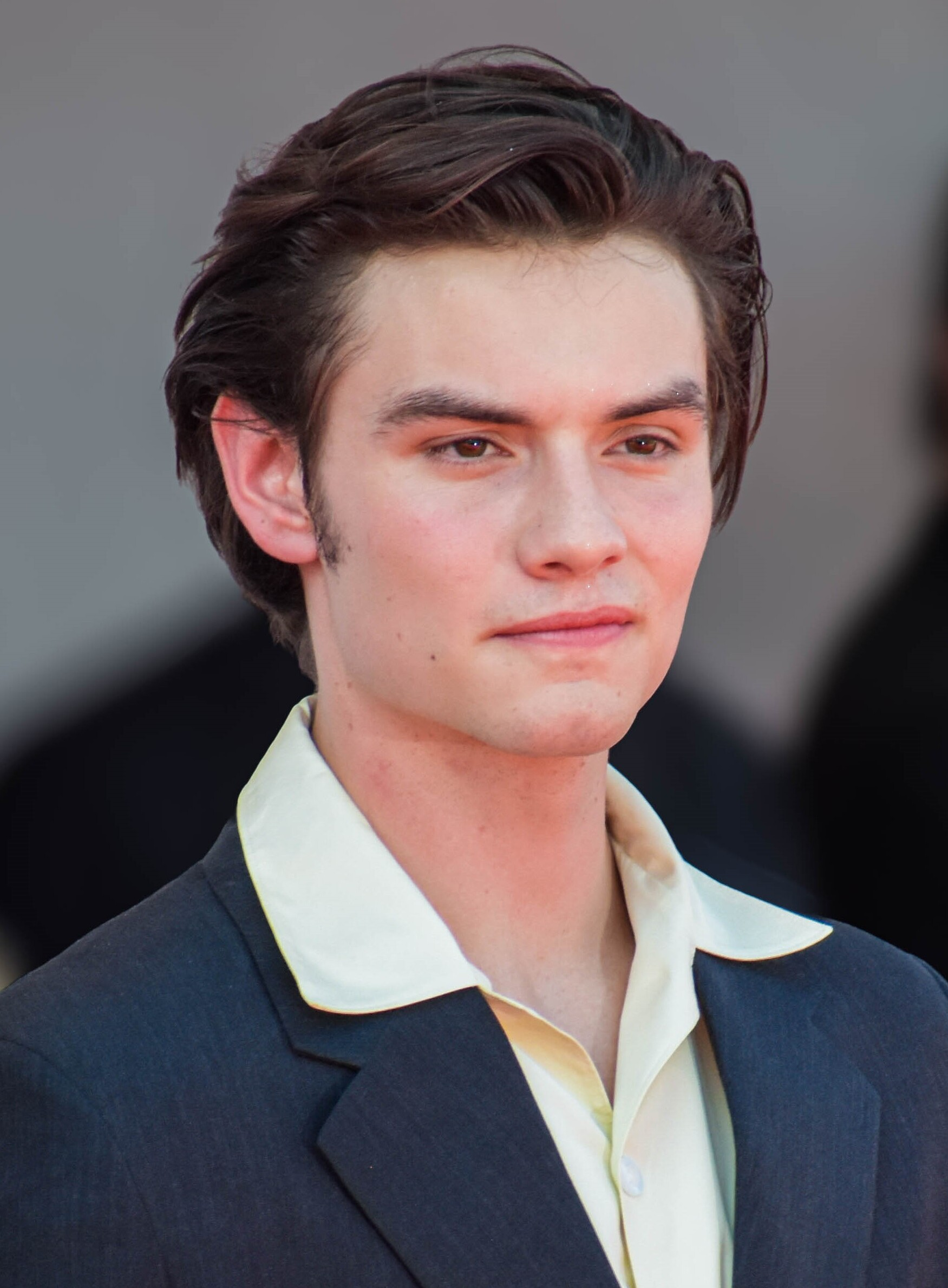
Actor Louis Partridge, who the song is speculated to be about.

Publications considered "So American" the first love song in Rodrigo's discography. In the lyrics, she describes dating a non-American man and praises him. Rodrigo begins the first line by recalling meeting him in a country where he had to drive on the right side of the road and calling him "a poem I wish I wrote". She continues describing their relationship in the chorus, stating that her jokes make him laugh, and he teases her for being "so American". He stimulates many feelings in her, and she decides that she would be willing to move anywhere for him and consider getting married: "Oh God, I'm gonna marry him / If he keeps this shit up." In the second verse, she self-deprecates and praises his dressing sense and reading habits, reflecting on her difficulty falling asleep when she is in his company. During the song's bridge, she assumes that she may be falling in love with the subject: "I don't wanna assume this stuff / But ain't it love? / Think I'm in love." Many critics interpreted "So American" to be about Rodrigo's relationship with Partridge. (Note: As discussed by People's Rachel DeSantis, Nylon's Steffanee Wang, Elle's Alyssa Bailey, Uproxx's Flisadam Pointer, and Billboard's Hannah Dailey.)

== Critical reception ==
Music critics found the song's optimistic take on love refreshing. Uproxx's Flisadam Pointer believed that while much of Rodrigo's previous music had chronicled her unpleasant romantic experiences, "So American" marked the conclusion of that trend and was her first soft song in a while. Writing for Elle, Alyssa Bailey thought the song provided a pleasantly hopeful take on newfound romance. Chris Willman of Variety described its composition as a "straight-up love song" as a rare occurrence in Rodrigo's output. Rolling Stone ranked it as the 12th best song of 2024 as of June.

In the context of "So American" being Rodrigo's first love song, many critics believed it succeeded. Pointer called it the heartfelt love song she was destined to create. Describing it as a euphoric pop anthem and a true rock & roll hit, Rolling Stone believed the song's greatness was potentially enhanced by the fact that she took so long to make a love song. Aadya Dusad of the South China Morning Post thought Rodrigo nailed her first attempt at one of them, as "So American" was full of joy and deeply romantic, and Harper's Bazaar's Ella Sangster believed the song's lyrics made it clear that the relationship described in it was thriving.

== Commercial performance ==
"So American" debuted at number 58 on the US Billboard Hot 100 issued for April 6, 2024. In Canada, the song entered at number 52 on the Canadian Hot 100 issued for the same date. It debuted at number 24 on the UK Singles Chart. In Australia, "So American" entered at number 76. The song charted at number 10 on the New Zealand Hot Singles chart. It debuted at number 66 on the Billboard Global 200. "So American" also reached number 18 in Ireland and number 96 in Greece.

== Credits and personnel ==
Credits are adapted from the liner notes of Guts (Spilled).

- Dan Nigro – producer, songwriter, background vocals
- Olivia Rodrigo – vocals, background vocals, songwriter
- Randy Merrill – mastering

== Charts ==
=== Weekly charts ===
Weekly chart positions for "So American"
Chart (2024)	Peak position
Australia (ARIA)	76
Canada Hot 100 (Billboard)	52
Global 200 (Billboard)	66
Greece International (IFPI)	96
Ireland (IRMA)	18
New Zealand Hot Singles (RMNZ)	10
UK Singles (Official Charts)	24
US Billboard Hot 100	58
US Hot Rock & Alternative Songs (Billboard)	7

=== Year-end charts ===
Year-end chart performance for "So American"
Chart (2024)	Position
US Hot Rock & Alternative Songs (Billboard)	69

== Certifications ==
Certifications for "So American"
Region	Certification	Certified units/sales
Australia (ARIA)	Platinum	70,000^{‡}
Brazil (Pro-Música Brasil)	Platinum	40,000^{‡}
Canada (Music Canada)	Platinum	80,000^{‡}
New Zealand (RMNZ)	Gold	15,000^{‡}
United Kingdom (BPI)	Silver	200,000^{‡}
^{‡} Sales+streaming figures based on certification alone.
