= FIYM (EP) =

EP by Forever in Your Mind
- Released: July 1, 2016
- Recorded: 2016
- Genres: Pop; teen pop
- Length: 13:50
- Label: Hollywood

Forever in Your Mind chronology
FIYM (2016)	Euphoric (2018)

Singles from FIYM
- 1. "Hurricane" Released: April 29, 2016

FIYM is the debut extended play by American pop boy band Forever in Your Mind. It was released on July 1, 2016, through Hollywood Records, and was preceded by its lead single, "Hurricane".

== Background ==
Following the band's creation in 2013 from a group of contestants on The X-Factor, Forever in Your Mind released several pop singles, such as "Sweet Little Something", before signing with Hollywood Records in November 2015. As artists signed to a record label of the Disney Music Group, members Liam Attridge, Ricky Garcia, and Emery Kelly cultivated the band's pop music style by recording medleys of tracks from popular Disney Channel movies and covers of contemporary chart-toppers, like Taylor Swift's "Wildest Dreams".

Shortly after announcing that the band would sign onto the record label, Garcia indicated that the band was excited to "officially" make music for its fans.

== Composition ==
FIYM is largely a pop music production, with lyrical and compositional tendencies toward the teen pop subgenre. Just as the debut EP of fellow Hollywood labelmate and Disney Channel actress Olivia Holt featured a diverse range of musical influences from track to track, the four tracks that comprise FIYM draw influences from several genres. Lead single "Hurricane" offers a rock-tinged sound, while the chorus of second single "Enough About Me" features disco roots. Third single "Compass" also provides a unique, folk-esque sound to the EP. AllMusic lists the EP's genre as "pop/rock".

== Promotion ==
=== Performances ===
Forever in Your Mind has performed tracks from FIYM throughout 2016 to promote the EP. On July 4, 2016, the band performed Hurricane on ABC's Good Morning America. Later that year, Forever in Your Mind played its first major headlining show at the iconic Roxy Theatre, performing "Enough About Me" and "Whistle" in addition to "Hurricane". The band also filmed a mini-series entitled "Road to the Roxy" to document their experiences leading up to the gig. The band joined labelmate Olivia Holt on her Rise of a Phoenix Tour as a supporting act, along with Ryland Lynch and Isac Elliot.

=== Singles ===
"Hurricane" was release as the only single from the EP on April 29, 2016. The music video, which shows the boys throwing a party in an abandoned house in the desert during a storm, was released on May 7.

"Enough About Me" premiered a music video the day prior to the EP's release on June 30, 2016. The video features a battle between the boys and three girls in a high school, in which both sides trade dares for one another to perform.

"Compass" music video was released on December 30, 2016, as the final visual premiere for FIYM. The video shows the boys walking along a trail up a mountain while singing.

== Track listing ==
No.	Title	Writer(s)	Length
1.	"Hurricane"	Dustin Atlas; Liam Attridge; Ricky Garcia; Emery Kelly; Doug Rockwell	3:32
2.	"Enough About Me"	Attridge; Garcia; Bill Grainer; Kelly; Rockwell	3:33
3.	"Compass"	Attridge; Garcia; Kelly; Khris Lorenz; Emily McDonald; Rockwell	3:49
4.	"Whistle"	Calynn Green; Steph Jones; Jintae Ko; Jordan Schmidt; Tanner Underwood	2:57

== Personnel ==
- Liam Attridge – vocals
- Ricky Garcia – vocals
- Emery Kelly – vocals

== Charts ==
Chart (2016)	Peak position
US Heatseekers Albums (Billboard)	19

== Release history ==
Region	Date	Format(s)	Label
United States	1 July 2016	CD; digital download	Hollywood
