= Bill Grainer =

American singer-songwriter

- Born: Brooklyn, New York, U.S.
- Origin: Marlboro Township, New Jersey, U.S.
- Genres: Pop, pop rock, dance-pop, R&B
- Occupation(s): Songwriter, record producer
- Years active: 2004–present
- Labels: Arista; Hollywood; Verve

Bill Grainer is a Grammy certified American songwriter and record producer. He has written for such artists as Jai McDowall, Linda Eder, and Jennifer Hudson, with whom he co-wrote the song "Stand Up" for her Grammy Award-winning self-titled debut album.

== Selected songwriting discography ==
Year	Artist	Album	Song	Co-written with
2007	Shayna Zaid	Half A World Away	"Percayalah Impianmu (A Better Life)"	Shayna Zaid, Joel Dean
2008	Jennifer Hudson	Jennifer Hudson	"Stand Up"	Jennifer Hudson, Earl Powell, Walter English
2008	Linda Eder	The Other Side of Me	"Other Side of Me"	Shaun Barker, Billy Jay Stein
2008	Linda Eder	The Other Side of Me	"Make Today Beautiful"	Shaun Barker, Billy Jay Stein
2011	Anthony Fedorov	Never Over	"Long Ago"	David Hurwitz, Anthony Fedorov
2012	Thomas Puskailer	Make Believe	"Make Believe"	Joel Dean, Evan Parness, Doug Rockwell
2012	Thomas Puskailer	Make Believe	"Artificial Light"	Joel Dean, Darko Saric, Doug Rockwell
2014	Auraganix	Every Little Thing	"Shine"	Anthony Fedorov
2014	Auraganix	Every Little Thing	"Baby Boy"	Anthony Fedorov, Jennifer Paz
2014	Auraganix	Every Little Thing	"Every Little Thing"	Anthony Fedorov, Jeff Vincent
2014	Auraganix	Every Little Thing	"Outside Looking In"	Anthony Fedorov, Jeff Vincent
2014	Auraganix	Every Little Thing	"Wanted"	Anthony Fedorov, Jeff Vincent
2014	Jai McDowall	I Begin Again - Single	"I Begin Again"	Anthony Fedorov
2014	Thomas Puskailer	-	"Have It All Tonight"	Harry Mondryk, Thomas Puskailer, Miroslav Vrlik
2014	Thomas Puskailer	-	"Dance With Me (Hey Pretty Lady)"	Harry Mondryk, Thomas Puskailer
2015	Thomas Puskailer	-	"Live For The Moment"	Harry Mondryk, Thomas Puskailer
2016	Forever in Your Mind	FIYM	"Enough About Me"	Ricky Garcia, Emery Kelly, Liam Attridge, Doug Rockwell

== Television and film ==
Grainer wrote both the opening and closing title songs (including “Don’t Blink” on which he was also the performing artist) for the cult horror film Flight of the Living Dead: Outbreak on a Plane.

His song “Curiosity” (performed by Tatiana Owens) was used as the theme of Lifetime Movie Network in 2011.

== Awards and nominations ==
Grammy Awards

- 2009 Grammy Award for Best R&B Album (Jennifer Hudson) (Winner)

Anugerah ERA (ERA Awards) (Malaysia)

- 2007: Best Pop Song (Shayna Zaid - "A Better Life") (Nominee)

== Current and upcoming projects ==
Grainer is currently working with Australian actor and singer-songwriter Sam Clark, Harry Mondryk (formerly of UK boy band ReConnected), American Idol’s Kimberley Locke, and UK band Nothing But Thieves.
