= Doug Rockwell =

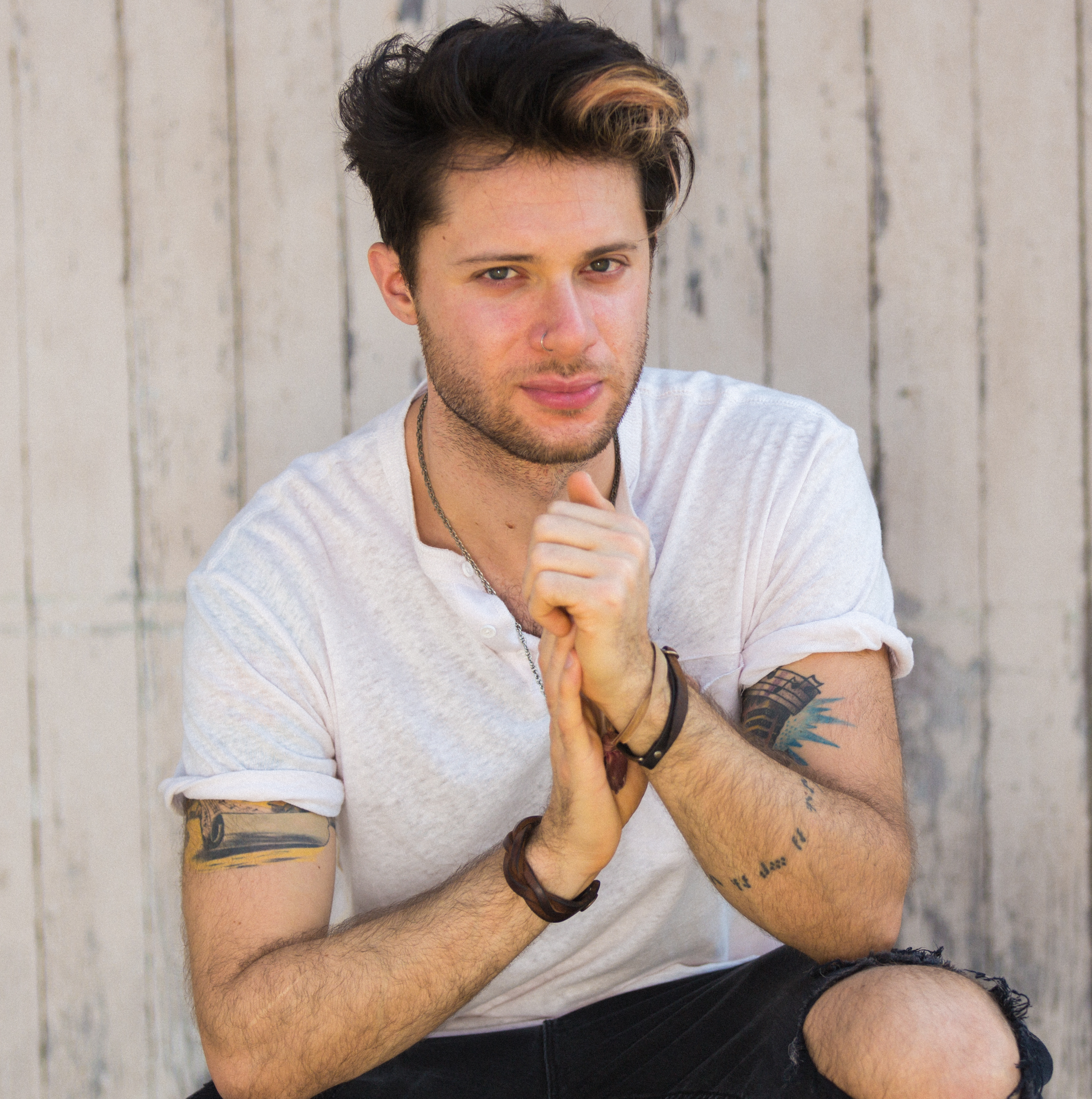

Background information
- Born: September 21, 1985 (age 41); Brooklyn, New York, United States
- Origin: Marlboro, New Jersey, United States
- Genres: Pop rock; EDM; indie; musical theater
- Occupations: Songwriter, record producer, musician, singer, composer
- Instruments: Vocals; guitar; piano; drums; programming
- Labels: Hollywood; Capitol; Columbia; Walt Disney; Republic

Doug Rockwell (born September 21, 1985) is an Emmy-winning songwriter, record producer and musician based in Los Angeles, CA.

== Background ==
Rockwell spent his earlier years touring as a front man for numerous rock acts. During this time, he also began his ascent into writing and producing for various artists which later earned him a seat alongside accomplished producer John Feldmann in Los Angeles. Here Doug worked with major acts like 5 Seconds Of Summer and Sleeping With Sirens.

In 2015, Rockwell signed a publishing deal with Disney Music Publishing. Since then, he has written and produced for acts such as Sofia Wylie, Joshua Bassett, Forever in Your Mind, New Hope Club, Dove Cameron, and Asher Angel.

He later began writing for television and film projects, and in 2017, won the ASCAP Screen Music Award for Top Television Series for his work on Nickelodeon's The Loud House. In 2018, Doug wrote all of the music for The Loud House's Emmy-winning rock opera special “Really Loud Music,” which was the show's highest rated episode. In that same episode he made his television debut by voicing a character based on a fictitious version of himself. He is also known for writing many of the songs for Marvel's “Marvel Rising” franchise.

Doug and his writing partner Tova Litvin wrote "Flesh & Bone," which became the hit song of Disney's "Zombies 2" in February 2020 and has since gained over 350,000,000 streams across platforms worldwide, and has been RIAA Certified Gold. The duo are also responsible for writing songs on Netflix's hit musical series "Julie & The Phantoms," whose soundtrack reached number 1 on both the US and Australian iTunes charts and peaked at number 4 on the US Billboard Soundtrack chart.

In 2023 at the 2nd Children's and Family Emmy Awards, he won an Emmy for Outstanding Original Song alongside his writing partners Tova Litvin and Joshua Bassett for "Finally Free," from High School Musical: The Musical: The Series on Disney+.

== Selected discography ==
Year	Artist	Album	Song	Role
2014	Kat DeLuna	Single	"Last Call"	Writer
2014	5 Seconds of Summer	Good Girls EP (Capitol)	"Good Girls" (acoustic), "Long Way Home" (acoustic)	Programming/Production
2015	Sleeping with Sirens	Madness (Epitaph)	"Gold", "Save Me A Spark", "Heroine"	Programming/Co-production
2015	Forever in Your Mind	Single (Hollywood)	"Wrapped Up For Christmas"	Writer/Producer
2016	Forever in Your Mind	FIYM (Hollywood)	"Hurricane"	Writer/Producer
2016	Forever in Your Mind	FIYM (Hollywood)	"Enough About Me"	Writer/Producer
2016	Forever in Your Mind	FIYM (Hollywood)	"Compass"	Writer
2016	Forever in Your Mind	Single (Hollywood)	"Celebrate (It's Christmas)"	Writer
2016	Laidback Luke & Will Sparks	Single (Armada)	"Promiscuous" ft. Alicia Madison	Writer
2017	New Hope Club	Welcome to the Club (Virgin EMI/Hollywood)	"Water"	Writer/Co-Producer
2017	Asher Angel	Single (Hollywood)	"Snow Globe Wonderland"	Writer/Producer
2018	Alicia Madison	Single (Spinnin' Records)	"Toxic Rain"	Writer
2018	Dove Cameron	Single from Marvel Rising: Secret Warriors (Walt Disney Records)	"Born Ready"	Writer/Producer
2019	Sofia Wylie	Single from Marvel Rising: Chasing Ghosts (Walt Disney Records)	"Side By Side"	Writer/Producer
2019	Tova	Single from Marvel Rising: Heart Of Iron (Walt Disney Records)	"Team"	Writer/Producer
2019	Evaride	Evaride, Vol. 1	"Limbo"	Writer/Producer
2019	Navia Robinson	Single from Marvel Rising: Playing With Fire (Walt Disney Records)	"Roaring Thunder"	Writer/Producer
2020	Cast of High School Musical: The Musical: The Series	High School Musical: The Musical: The Series: The Soundtrack (Walt Disney Records)	"Born To Be Brave"	Writer/Producer
2020	Cast of Zombies 2	ZOMBIES 2 (Original TV Movie Soundtrack) (Walt Disney Records)	"Flesh & Bone"	Writer/Producer
2020	Milo Manheim	Single (Walt Disney Records)	"We Own The Summer"	Writer/Co-Producer
2020	Sunset Curve	Julie and the Phantoms (Netflix Original Series Soundtrack) (Columbia Records)	"Now Or Never"	Writer/Producer
2020	Cheyenne Jackson	Julie and the Phantoms (Netflix Original Series Soundtrack) (Columbia Records)	"The Other Side Of Hollywood"	Writer/Producer
2021	Cast of High School Musical: The Musical: The Series	High School Musical: The Musical: The Series: The Soundtrack (Walt Disney Records)	"You Ain't Seen Nothin'"	Writer/Producer
2021	All Good Things	A Hope In Hell (Better Noise Music)	"Push Me Down"	Writer/Producer
2021	Chanmina	Harenchi (Warner Music Group)	"^_^"	Writer
2022	Joshua Bassett	—N/a	"Finally Free"	Writer/Producer
2023	Hinata Kashiwagi	kokokara. (Sony Music Entertainment Japan)	"From Bow To Toe"	Writer/Producer
2026	After Hours	Off Campus: The Mixtape (Island Records)	"Keep Pretending"	Writer/Producer
2026	After Hours	Off Campus: The Mixtape (Island Records)	"Yellow Haze"	Writer/Producer
2026	After Hours	Off Campus: The Mixtape (Island Records)	"Dirty Little Secret"	Producer
2026	After Hours	Off Campus: The Mixtape (Island Records)	"U + Ur Hand"	Producer
2026	After Hours	Off Campus: The Mixtape (Island Records)	"Kiss You"	Producer
2026	After Hours	Off Campus: The Mixtape (Island Records)	"Into You"	Producer
2026	After Hours	—N/a	"Blue (Her Aura Was)"	Producer
2026	After Hours	—N/a	"Waves Of You"	Producer

== TV and film ==
Year	Series/movie	Episode	Song	Role
2014	Nicky, Ricky, Dicky & Dawn	All Episodes	Theme Song	Writer/Producer/Performer
2015	Blaze and the Monster Machines	Race To Eagle Rock	"Velocity"	Writer/Producer
2015	Blaze and the Monster Machines	Reoccuring	"Ride of Our Lives"	Writer/Producer
2016	The Loud House	All Episodes	"In The Loud House" (Theme Song)	Writer/Producer/Performer
2016	The Loud House	11 Louds a Leapin'	"That's What Christmas Is All About"	Writer/Producer
2016	The Loud House	For Bros About To Rock	"Smooch"	Writer/Producer
2016	The Loud House	For Bros About To Rock	"Transformation" (Mick Swagger)	Writer/Producer
2017	The Loud House	Yes Man	"Best Dang Brother"	Writer/Producer
2017	The Loud House	Tricked!	"You Got Tricked"	Writer/Producer
2018	The Loud House	Tripped!	"Road Trippin' Blues"	Writer/Producer
2018	The Loud House	The Loudest Thanksgiving	"Grateful (Agradecido)"	Writer/Producer
2018	The Loud House	Really Loud Music	"Play It Loud"	Writer/Producer
2018	The Loud House	Really Loud Music	"Toilet Jam"	Writer/Producer
2018	The Loud House	Really Loud Music	"Glam Song"	Writer/Producer
2018	The Loud House	Really Loud Music	"Lori2Leni"	Writer/Producer
2018	The Loud House	Really Loud Music	"Periodic Table Rap"	Writer/Producer
2018	The Loud House	Really Loud Music	"Luan's Laugh Parade"	Writer/Producer
2018	The Loud House	Really Loud Music	"Song of Silence"	Writer/Producer
2018	The Loud House	Really Loud Music	"Get Pumped"	Writer/Producer
2018	The Loud House	Really Loud Music	"That's Our Kinda Song"	Writer/Producer
2018	The Loud House	Really Loud Music	"Best Buds"	Writer/Producer
2018	The Loud House	Really Loud Music	"Best Thing Ever"	Writer/Producer
2018	The Loud House	Really Loud Music	"What Everybody Wants"	Writer/Producer
2018	The Loud House	Really Loud Music	"Changing Luna"	Writer/Producer/Performer
2018	The Loud House	Really Loud Music	"What Have I Done?"	Writer/Producer
2018	Marvel Rising	Secret Warriors	"Born Ready"	Writer/Producer
2019	Marvel Rising	Chasing Ghosts	"Side By Side"	Writer/Producer
2019	Marvel Rising	Heart Of Iron	”Team”	Writer/Producer
2019	Marvel Rising	Battle Of The Bands	"Natural Disaster"	Writer/Producer
2019	Marvel Rising	Playing With Fire	"Roaring Thunder"	Writer/Producer
2019	High School Musical: The Musical: The Series	Homecoming	"Born To Be Brave"	Writer/Producer
2020	Zombies 2	—N/a	"Flesh & Bone"	Writer/Producer
2020	Addison's Moonstone Mystery	—N/a	"More Than A Mystery"	Writer/Producer
2020	Julie and the Phantoms	Wake Up	"Now Or Never"	Writer/Producer
2020	Julie and the Phantoms	The Other Side Of Hollywood	"The Other Side Of Hollywood"	Writer/Producer
2020	The Loud House	Schooled!	"We Got This"	Writer/Producer
2020	The Loud House	Schooled!	"Welcome To Canada"	Writer/Producer/Performer
2020	High School Musical: The Musical: The Series	High School Musical: The Musical: The Holiday Special	"Little Saint Nick" ft. Joshua Bassett and Matt Cornett	Producer
2021	Tooned In	All Episodes	"Tooned In" (Theme Song)	Writer/Producer/Performer
2021	High School Musical: The Musical: The Series	Spring Break	"You Ain't Seen Nothin'"	Writer/Producer
2021	The Loud House Movie	—N/a	"Loud Castle"	Writer/Producer/Performer
2021	The Loud House Movie	—N/a	"Life Is Better Loud"	Writer/Producer/Performer
2022	Sneakerella	—N/a	"Life Is What You Make It”	Writer/Producer
2022	The Loud House	Save Royal Woods!	"Already Forgot About You"	Writer/Producer
2022	The Loud House	Save Royal Woods!	"Flippee Jingle"	Writer/Producer
2022	The Loud House	Save Royal Woods!	"Keep Us Around"	Writer/Producer
2022	The Loud House	Save Royal Woods!	"Right Where We Belong"	Writer/Producer
2022	High School Musical: The Musical: The Series	Happy Campers	"Finally Free"	Writer/Producer
2022	High School Musical: The Musical: The Series	Happy Campers	"What Time Is It/Start The Party Mashup"	Producer
2023	High School Musical: The Musical: The Series	Trick Or Treat	"Nightmares Come To Life"	Writer/Producer
2023	High School Musical: The Musical: The Series	Admissions	"Speak Out"	Writer/Producer
2023	High School Musical: The Musical: The Series	Born To Be Brave	"Born To Be Brave (Reprise)"	Writer/Producer
2023	Zombies: The Re-Animated Series	Endless Summer	"Endless Summer"	Writer/Producer
2023	Zombies: The Re-Animated Series	Suddenly Seabrook	"It's Bucky!"	Writer/Producer
2023	Zombies: The Re-Animated Series	Robot Space Bear	"What Do We Do Right Now?"	Writer/Producer
2023	Zombies: The Re-Animated Series	Wynter Transport	"I Still See You"	Writer/Producer
2023	Baby Shark's Big Movie!	—N/a	"Dive On In"	Writer/Producer
2023	Baby Shark's Big Movie!	—N/a	"Peak Finship"	Writer/Producer
2023	Baby Shark's Big Movie!	—N/a	"Ocean's Apart"	Writer/Producer
2024	Zombies: The Re-Animated Series	Screambrook	"We're Bringin' It"	Writer/Producer
2024	Zombies: The Re-Animated Series	When Bucky Met Barky	"Be Like Me"	Writer/Producer
2024	Zombies: The Re-Animated Series	Reality Check, Please!	"Back 2 Back"	Writer/Producer
2024	Zombies: The Re-Animated Series	Return Of The Living Zed	"Work In Progress"	Writer/Producer
2024	Zombies: The Re-Animated Series	I Wanna Dance With SomeZombie	"Brighter With You"	Writer/Producer
2024	Zombies: The Re-Animated Series	Santler Claws Is Comin' To Town	"Holly Jolly Zolidays"	Writer/Producer
2024	Zombies: The Re-Animated Series	Santler Claws Is Comin' To Town	"Z-Town Showdown"	Writer/Producer
2025	Electric Bloom	—N/a	"Wolfpack Energy"	Writer/Producer
2025	Zombies 4: Dawn of the Vampires	—N/a	"Legends In The Making"	Writer/Producer
2026	Zombies: The Re-Animated Series	Fiends In High Places	"Best Day Of Our Lives"	Writer/Producer
2026	Zombies: The Re-Animated Series	Bree-Cast News	"Take It To The Top"	Writer/Producer
2026	Zombies: The Re-Animated Series	Bree-Cast News	"Gotta Have Fun"	Writer/Producer
2026	Zombies: The Re-Animated Series	Bree-Cast News	"I'm So Amazing"	Writer/Producer
2026	Off Campus	The Practice	"Keep Pretending"	Writer/Producer
2026	Off Campus	The Practice	"Page 1"	Performer
2026	Off Campus	The Breakaway	"Yellow Haze"	Writer/Producer
2026	Off Campus	The Breakaway	"Dirty Little Secret"	Producer
2026	Off Campus	The Breakaway	"U + Ur Hand"	Producer
2026	Off Campus	The Breakaway	"Kiss You"	Producer
2026	Off Campus	The Breakaway	"Into You"	Producer

== Awards and nominations ==
Year	Presenter	Award/Category	Nominee	Status	Ref.
2017	ASCAP Screen Music Award	Top Television Series	Doug Rockwell, Michelle Lewis, and Phillip Cimino	Won	
2019	46th Daytime Emmy Awards	Outstanding Music Direction and Composition	Doug Rockwell and Michelle Lewis	Nominated	
2019	46th Daytime Emmy Awards	Outstanding Children's Animated Series	The Loud House	Won	
2021	ASCAP Screen Music Award	Top Television Series	Doug Rockwell and Michelle Lewis	Won	
2021	48th Daytime Emmy Awards	Outstanding Original Song for "The Other Side Of Hollywood" from Julie and the Phantoms	Doug Rockwell and Tova Litvin	Nominated	
2023	2nd Children's and Family Emmy Awards	Outstanding Original Song for "Finally Free" from High School Musical: The Musical: The Series	Doug Rockwell, Tova Litvin and Joshua Bassett	Won	
2024	3rd Children's and Family Emmy Awards	Outstanding Original Song for "Speak Out" from High School Musical: The Musical: The Series	Doug Rockwell, Tova Litvin and Joshua Bassett	Nominated	
