= Forever in Your Mind =

American pop boy band (2013–2018)

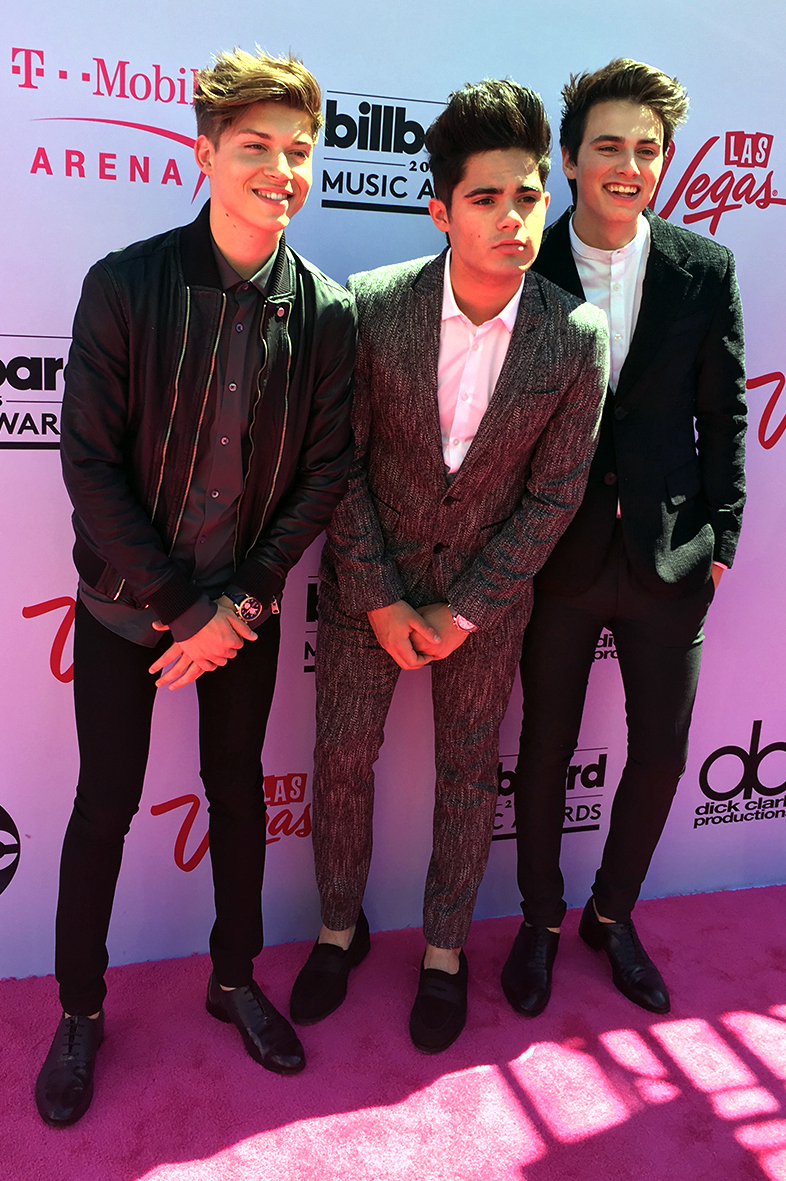
- Forever in Your Mind in 2016. Left to right: Garcia, Kelly, and Attridge.

Background information
- Also known as: FIYM
- Origin: Los Angeles, California
- Genre: Pop
- Years active: 2013–2018
- Label: Hollywood
- Past members: Emery Kelly; Ricky Garcia; Jon Klaasen; Liam Attridge
- Website: FIYM

Forever in Your Mind (FIYM) was an American pop boy band formed in 2013, consisting of Emery Kelly, Ricky Garcia, and Liam Attridge; their debut extended play, FIYM, was released through Hollywood Records on July 1, 2016.

== History ==
=== 2013–2015: Formation ===
In 2013, Emery Kelly (as a solo artist), age 16, and Ricky Garcia (as part of a group), age 14, auditioned for season 3 of The X Factor USA. They were eliminated during the boot camp round. However, judge Simon Cowell asked Kelly and Garcia to remain on the show, teaming them with Garcia's group member Jon Klaasen to form a trio he named Forever in Your Mind. They sang a cover of the Jonas Brothers' "Lovebug" and were the last contestants cut before the final sixteen. On November 7, 2013, their first music video, "She Lights the World," premiered on Just Jared Jr. The song was written by Charlie Midnight and Allen Copeland.

In June 2014, Klaasen left the band and was replaced the following month by Kelly's cousin, Liam Attridge. Klaasen would later reach Hollywood Week on American Idol season 15, followed by being a competitor on Boy Band.

Forever in Your Mind released the song "Sweet Little Something" on March 12, 2015; a second version featuring Jordyn Jones, a singer who was on Abby's Ultimate Dance Competition in her youth, was released three days later, on March 15. The band signed to Hollywood Records in November 2015 and released a music video for their holiday-themed song, "Wrapped Up for Christmas," in December 2015.

=== 2016: FIYM ===
Following the High School Musical 10-year anniversary special that aired on Disney Channel on January 20, 2016, Forever in Your Mind created a three-minute medley of songs from the movie. They later recorded a medley of five songs from Disney Channel films ("Wildside" from Adventures in Babysitting, "This Is Me" from Camp Rock, "Cruisin' for a Bruisin'" from Teen Beach Movie, "Rotten to the Core" from Descendants, and "Breaking Free" from High School Musical), which was included on the 2016 soundtrack, Your Favorite Songs from 100 Disney Channel Original Movies. Other cover songs the band recorded include Taylor Swift's "Wildest Dreams," the DNCE single "Cake by the Ocean," and Mark Ronson and Bruno Mars' "Uptown Funk".

On April 29, 2016, the group released "Hurricane," the only single from their then-upcoming extended play (EP). They co-wrote the song with Doug Rockwell and Dustin Atlas. It premiered on Radio Disney three days earlier. On June 30, 2016, Teen Vogue premiered the music video for the EP's second track, "Enough About Me," which the group co-wrote with Grammy certified songwriter Bill Grainer and Doug Rockwell. On July 1, 2016, Forever in Your Mind released their debut EP, FIYM.

=== 2017–2018: Euphoric ===
Forever in Your Mind released the non-album single, "Smooth," on April 28, 2017, after promoting their debut EP throughout much of 2016. The single release featured the B-side track, "Missing," a pop ballad that laments a relationship fractured beyond repair.

Toward the end of 2017, the band announced the upcoming release of their latest EP, Euphoric, preceded by its lead single, "Rabbit Hole". The EP became available for pre-order on December 15, 2017, and was fully released on January 12, 2018.

On October 28, 2018, Forever in Your Mind released their single "Let Go," their first musical release since Euphoric.

== Members ==
- Emery Kelly – vocals (2013–2018)
- Ricky Garcia – vocals (2013–2018)
- Jon Klaasen – vocals (2013–2014)
- Liam Attridge – vocals (2014–2018)

== Performances ==
Forever in Your Mind performed live with Demi Lovato, Fifth Harmony, Jesse McCartney, and Bea Miller, touring North America as a part of DigiTour in 2015. The band presented an award on stage at the 2016 Radio Disney Music Awards on May 1, 2016, and made their national television debut in a performance on ABC's Good Morning America on July 4, 2016. In 2016, the band toured with Olivia Holt, Ryland Lynch, and Isac Elliot. The band performed with Holt at the 2016 TJ Martell Family Foundation Day in Los Angeles on October 9, 2016. Their Euphoric tour concluded on July 20, 2018.

== Television ==
Garcia made a guest appearance in Girl Meets World, but is best known for his role as Naldo on the Disney Channel comedy series, Best Friends Whenever, which premiered on June 26, 2015. Kelly made an appearance on the show's first episode. The Forever in Your Mind song "Whenever" is the theme song on Best Friends Whenever, and their cover of KC and the Sunshine Band's "(Shake, Shake, Shake) Shake Your Booty" was in the seventh episode, a 1970s flashback, that aired on August 23, 2015.

In August 2016, it was announced that Disney Channel greenlit a supernatural comedy pilot starring Garcia, Kelly, and Attridge, titled Forever Boys. The series, directed by Adam Stein, would have followed three brothers bitten by a vampire during their first concert in 1957. After keeping their vampire identities secret for over half a century, a music producer convinced them to reemerge as a vampire boy band. On January 12, 2018, Forever in Your Mind revealed that the show was not picked up. If picked up, the series would have debuted in 2017.

Kelly played Lucas Mendoza on the Netflix series, Alexa & Katie, from 2018 to 2020. The first season released on March 23, 2018, the second seasonon December 26, 2018. In season 2, Garcia and Attridge appeared in several episodes as Cameron and Steve, two inexperienced musicians Lucas auditioned to be part of his band. The band performed in the season two finale.

=== Ricky Garcia ===
Year	Title	Role	Note	Ref.
2013	It's Always Sunny in Philadelphia	Cool Kid	Episode; "Gun Fever Too: Still Hot"	
2014	Girl Meets World	Asher	Episode; "Girl Meets Friendship"	
2014	Mantervention	Young Spencer	Feature film	
2015-2016	Best Friends Whenever	Naldo Montoya	Main cast	
2017	Bigger Fatter Liar	Kevin Shepherd	Feature film	
2018	Nicky, Ricky, Dicky & Dawn	Zeus	Episode; "Quadbusters"	
2018	Alexa & Katie	Cameron	4 episodes	
2019	Game Shakers	Wokeen	3 episodes	
2019	Red Ruby	Ian	7 episodes	
2019	Secrets at the Lake	Luke Pruitt	Feature film	
2019	Angel	Angel	Feature film	
2020	Finding ʻOhana	Monks	Feature film	
2022	Station 19	Aston	Episode; "In My Tree"	
2025	Law & Order: Special Victims Unit	Anthony Reed	Episode; "Master Key"	

=== Emery Kelly ===
Year	Title	Role	Note	Ref.
2015	Dog with a Blog	Dax	Episode; "You're Not My Sister Anymore"	
2015	Best Friends Whenever	Cameron	Episode; "A Time to Travel"	
2015	Lab Rats	Logan	2 episodes	
2018-2020	Alexa & Katie	Lucas Mendoza	Main cast	
2019	Max Winslow and the House of Secrets	Aiden	Feature film	
2021	Big Shot	Dylan	Recurring role (Season 1); 5 episodes	
2024	Prom Dates	Reggie	Feature film	
2024	The Lady of the Lake: The Legend of Lake Ronkonkoma	Rocky	Feature film	

=== Liam Attridge ===
Year	Title	Role	Note
2018	Millennial Rules	Ethan Larson	Television movie
2018	Alexa & Katie	Steve	3 episodes
2020	Bottle Monster	Jack	Feature film

== Discography ==
=== Extended plays ===
Title	Notes
FIYM	Released: July 1, 2016; Label: Hollywood; Format: CD, digital download
Euphoric	Released: January 12, 2018; Label: Hollywood; Format: CD, digital download

=== Singles ===
Title	Year	Album
"She Lights the World"	2013	Non-album singles
"Naughty List"	2014	Non-album singles
"Sweet Little Something"	2015	Non-album singles
"Wrapped Up for Christmas"	2015	Non-album singles
"Hurricane"	2016	FIYM
"Smooth"	2017	—N/a
"Rabbit Hole"	2017	Euphoric
"Let Go"	2018	—N/a

=== Other appearances ===
List of non-single guest appearances, with other performing artists, showing year released and album name
Year	Title	Other artist(s)	Album
2015	"Whenever" (from Best Friends Whenever)	None	Non-album singles
2015	"Shake Your Booty" (from Best Friends Whenever)	None	Non-album singles
2016	"DC Classics Medley"	None	Your Favorite Songs from 100 Disney Channel Original Movies
