= Alexa & Katie =

Netflix original sitcom

- Genre: Sitcom
- Created by: Heather Wordham
- Showrunners: Matthew Carlson (season 1); Heather Wordham (seasons 2 & 3)
- Starring: Paris Berelc; Isabel May; Jolie Jenkins; Emery Kelly; Eddie Shin; Finn Carr; Tiffani Thiessen; Jack Griffo
- Opening theme: "Alexa and Katie Main Title Theme" by Paris Berelc
- Ending theme: "Alexa and Katie Main Title Theme" (instrumental)
- Composers: Matt Mariano; Zach Stretten-Carlson
- Country of origin: United States
- Original language: English
- No. of seasons: 3 (4 parts)
- No. of episodes: 39

Production
- Executive producers: Heather Wordham; Matthew Carlson
- Producers: Bob Heath; Ray Lancon; Julia Miranda; Max Burnett
- Cinematography: Christian La Fountaine; Wayne Kennan
- Editor: Kirk Benson
- Camera setup: Multi-camera
- Running time: 23–37 minutes
- Production company: Vanity Logo Productions (season 1)

Original release
- Network: Netflix
- Release: March 23, 2018 – June 13, 2020

Alexa & Katie is an American sitcom created by Heather Wordham as a Netflix original series. Matthew Carlson serves as showrunner. The series stars Paris Berelc (Alexa) and Isabel May (Katie). Alexa is a high schooler living with cancer but, luckily, her best friend, Katie, helps her every step of the way. Jolie Jenkins, Emery Kelly, Eddie Shin, Finn Carr, Tiffani Thiessen, and Jack Griffo also star in this sitcom. The series debuted on Netflix on March 23, 2018, and ran for four parts, concluding on June 13, 2020.

== Premise ==
Lifelong best friends Alexa Mendoza and Katie Cooper are eagerly anticipating the start of their freshman year of high school. However, Alexa has cancer sadly, which leaves them feeling like outsiders at a time when what seems to matter most is fitting in. To support Alexa, Katie makes an important decision and shaves her head with Alexa. The girls try to navigate through all the troubles that high school seems to bring, together, while Alexa is dealing with cancer.

== Cast ==
=== Main ===
- Paris Berelc as Alexa Mendoza, an ambitious basketball player battling leukemia, (Note: season 3 episode 7) a type of cancer in the blood. A determined individual, she strives to live a normal life which often gives her rebellious tendencies. She also despises the pity she receives because of her illness.
- Isabel May as Katie Cooper, Alexa's best friend. Portrayed as quirky and awkward, she consistently supports Alexa's impulsive decisions when dealing with the illness. Katie also shares a liking for theatre. She seems to be attracted to Lucas, Alexa's older brother.
- Jolie Jenkins as Jennifer Cooper, Katie's divorced, single mother studying to finish college while working. She is the matriarch of the Cooper family. Because of her home situation, the Cooper family is less financially fortunate than the Mendoza family.
- Emery Kelly as Lucas Mendoza, Alexa's older brother. Often portrayed as dimwitted and conceited, he cares a great deal for Alexa and aspires to be a doctor, wanting to help others as the doctors helped her. In season two, he becomes the lead of his own band.
- Eddie Shin as Dave Mendoza, Alexa and Lucas' father, Lori's husband, and an airline pilot. When Alexa shaves her head, he struggles to cope with the reality but eventually realizes his faults. He is also shown to have competitive tendencies like his wife, Lori. He also loves to brag about being a pilot.
- Finn Carr as Jack Cooper, Jennifer's son and Katie's younger brother with an avid love for candy and video games. Despite his age, he understands Alexa's situation and helps her the best he can. He eventually adopts a dog, Potato in Season 1, Winter Formal, Part 2.
- Tiffani Thiessen as Lori Mendoza, Alexa and Lucas' mother, Dave's wife. Strong-willed, competitive, and at times overprotective, she helps guide Alexa through her fight with cancer and additional problems as a teen.
- Jack Griffo as Dylan Greene (recurring in season 1 & 3; main in season 2), Lucas' highly intelligent best friend. He begins tutoring Alexa in season one when her grades drop. Later, Dylan asks Alexa to the Winter Formal and the two begin dating. In season two, Alexa breaks up with Dylan when he does not know what will happen to them when he goes to college, but they eventually agree to be friends.

=== Recurring ===
- Kerri Medders as Gwenny, Alexa's self-absorbed and manipulative rival on the girls' basketball team. Much to Alexa's dismay, Gwenny begins acting kinder towards her after learning about Alexa's illness. She also begins dating Lucas in season two, but they break up in season three.
- Iman Benson as Reagan, a friend of Alexa and Katie. She is more sensible than Hannah. Often portrayed as self-centered, Reagan's selfishness is a running gag in the series.
- Merit Leighton as Hannah, a friend of Alexa and Katie. She is more naive and dimwitted than Reagan. In season two, she joins the school's cheerleading team. Hannah has two mothers. (Note: season 3 episode 1)
- Nathaniel J. Potvin as Ryan, an awkward friend of Katie who worked with her in the school play. Ryan becomes Katie's first kiss, and although the two have feelings for one another, they are not acknowledged directly until the season two finale. He also has a single father.
- Nadja Alaya as Megan, a friend of Alexa who also has cancer. Initially shown in the hospital, it is implied that Megan's sickness has begun to cease due to her attendance at Alexa's Sweet Sixteen.
- Alyssa Jirrels as Vanessa (season 1), a student who worked in the school play. Because she lost the lead role to Katie, Vanessa is often passive aggressive towards her.
- Ricky Garcia as Cameron (season 2), a dimwitted friend of Lucas and a member of his band. He often follows Lucas around, mirroring his style.
- Scott Wordham as Barry, the manager at Wired, a local coffee shop in Wellard. He is often pessimistic and negative, but allows Katie to work as a barista.
- Jordan Austin Smith as Cody (seasons 2–3), a new student whose locker is between Alexa and Katie's. Alexa befriends him, content with the realization that he is unaware of her cancer. He is also the school basketball team mascot.
- Constance Marie as Dr. Corts (season 3), Alexa's therapist. Katie is also treated by her for anxiety.
- Gunner Burkhardt as Spencer (season 3), a boy Alexa meets at the hospital who has cancer (Hodgkin lymphoma). (Note: season 3 episode 7) Although Alexa initially has no romantic feelings for him, Alexa later develops feelings for him and they start dating.
- Barrett Carnahan as Aiden (season 3), a stress-free guy that works at Putt Putt Golf and acts as an annoyance for Katie. However, as time goes on, they develop feelings for each other. He later works as a barista at Wired.
- Brady Smith as Joe Perry (season 3), a handyman that starts to date Jennifer.

=== Guest stars ===
- Anthony Keyvan as Nathan, a student who worked in the school play. A sensitive individual, his existence has become a running gag as he is often ignored.
- Megan Truong as Britney (season 1), a student on the girls' basketball team. She also worked in the school play.
- Tess Aubert as Mackenzie (season 1), a student on the girls' basketball team. She initially thinks that Britney is the student with cancer.
- Jenica Bergere as Coach Winters, the coach of the girls' basketball team. When Alexa tries out in season two, Winters disappoints her by putting her in junior varsity.
- Katie Walder as Ms. Rogers (season 1), the drama teacher who led the school's play in season one. A running gag is her constant mentioning of her one-sided relationship with her boyfriend.
- Carmella Riley as Nurse Lynda (season 1), a nurse who works at Alexa and Megan's hospital. It is implied that Alexa played pranks on her before being cleared.
- Alan Ritchson as Robbie (season 1), Katie and Jack's father and Jennifer's ex-husband.
- Avery Monsen as Nurse Chad, a nurse who works at Alexa and Megan's hospital. Often nervous, he is shown to be afraid of Alexa's competitive mother, Lori.
- Liam Attridge as Steve (season 2), a dimwitted friend of Lucas and a member of Lucas' band. Along with Cameron, he also follows and mirror's Lucas' style.
- Gregg Daniel as Dr. Breitweiser (season 2), Alexa's doctor who manages her checkups. In season two, he allows her to play basketball due to the improvement in her health.

== Production ==
Alexa & Katie is the first multi-camera sitcom produced by Netflix. The series was ordered in early 2017 with Wordham as executive producer. Berelc and May would star as the protagonists with Carlson serving as showrunner. In June 2017, Thiessen, Shin and Kelly were cast as Alexa's parents and older brother, with Jenkins cast as May's mother. In August 2017, Griffo, Medders and Leighton were cast as Berelc and May's classmates. The first season was released on March 23, 2018. Less than three weeks later, on April 9, Netflix renewed the series for a second season, with Wordham replacing Carlson as showrunner.

On February 15, 2019, the series was renewed for a third season of 16 episodes. The season was split into two parts, each featuring eight episodes and focusing on Berelc and May's characters navigating through their final years of high school. The first part of the third season premiered on December 30, 2019. The second part of the third season, which served as the series' conclusion, was released on June 13, 2020.

== Episodes ==
=== Series overview ===
Season	Episodes		Originally released
1	13		March 23, 2018
2	10		December 26, 2018
3	16	8	December 30, 2019
3	16	8	June 13, 2020

=== Season 1 (2018) ===
No. overall	No. in season	Title	Directed by	Written by	Original release date
1	1	"Bad Hair Day"	Andy Cadiff	Heather Wordham	March 23, 2018
Alexa has leukemia, a type of cancer, and after the doctor clears her for school, she and her best friend, Katie, get ready to start their first day of high school. However, due to Alexa's chemo, her hair begins to fall out, which leaves her distressed. She convinces Katie to teepee her rival, Gwenny's, house, but they then realize they accidentally teepee'd their principal Trugly's house. After being suspended for three days, Dave then finds out that Alexa knew she was teepee'ing Trugly, making Katie upset. After Jennifer returns Katie's ski cap, which Alexa had borrowed when they teepee'd Trugly's house, Katie finds Alexa's hair in the cap and realizes why Alexa wanted to get in trouble. After Katie confronts Alexa, Katie helps Alexa by shaving her hair off, claiming that Alexa will never have to go through anything alone. Guest stars: Kerri Medders as Gwenny, Iman Benson as Reagan, Merit Leighton as Hannah, Nadja Alaya as Megan, Carmella Riley as Nurse
2	2	"Wigs"	Andy Cadiff	Heather Wordham	March 23, 2018
After the girls shaved their hair off, they go to a department store to buy wigs. The wig Katie wants to buy, however, costs $300, more than she can afford. Not wanting to let Alexa know about her money troubles, she buys the wig anyway, along with a brightly colored one. They also avoid Hannah and Reagan on many occasions making them upset. Meanwhile, Dave struggles with seeing Alexa without any hair and offends her after seeing her in her expensive wig saying "There's my girl". Katie has to return the wig until Jennifer gets her paycheck. Alexa and Katie then attend their first day of high school in the brightly colored cheap wigs. Guest stars: Iman Benson as Reagan, Merit Leighton as Hannah, Clint Culp as Security Guard, Beverly Leech as Saleswoman, Cutter Garcia as Delivery Person
3	3	"Basketball"	Jeff Melman	Matthew Carlson	March 23, 2018
Alexa wants to try out for the basketball team and compete with her rival, but due to her chemo, she is not allowed to. Katie tries out for her as a sign of support. Subsequently, a rumor starts to spread that someone in the grade has cancer. Lori starts to work from home to be closer to Alexa, but it does not work out, due to Lori being so preoccupied with work as she struggles to parent. During basketball try-outs, Katie blocks a ball through an air jump, but causes Katie's wig to fall off and her bald head is revealed, leading everyone to believe she is the one with cancer. Guest stars: Jenica Bergere as Coach Winters, Kerri Medders as Gwenny, Iman Benson as Reagan, Merit Leighton as Hannah
4	4	"Ungroundable"	Jeff Melman	Nancy Cohen	March 23, 2018
Alexa continually ropes Katie into doing bad things with her to prove to her that her mother will not ground her. Including watching a rated R movie, spilling coffee on her mom's favorite sweater, etc. Then after having a heartfelt talk with Lori, Lori agrees to try to be around more. Eventually, Lori comes to her senses and grounds Alexa for getting a bad grade on her math test and hires a tutor, Lucas's friend Dylan. Guest stars: Jack Griffo as Dylan, Scott Wordham as Barry
5	5	"The Play, Part 1"	Jeff Melman	Gary Murphy	March 23, 2018
As everyone thinks Katie is the one with cancer, everyone begins being so nice to her. After getting the lead part in the play Romeo and Juliet, she is left wondering if she is getting special treatment so Alexa tells everyone that she is the one with cancer to give Katie a fair chance. Jennifer asks Lucas to babysit Jack, however it proves harder than he thought. Guest stars: Merit Leighton as Hannah, Nathaniel Potvin as Ryan, Katie Walder as Ms. Rogers, Alyssa Jirrels as Vanessa
6	6	"Picture Day (Note: Although shown as is in the episode list on Netflix, "Picture Day" and "The Play, Part 2" are listed in reverse chronological order.)"	Victor Gonzalez	Ray Lancon	March 23, 2018
Since Alexa has revealed she is the one with cancer everyone has started being very nice to her – even her rival, Gwenny. She continually plays pranks on Gwenny to get her to start being mean to her again, which ultimately works as Gwenny wrecks Alexa's wig right before the school photos, Lori was able to get a new wig in time but Alexa ends up changing her mind and takes the photo with out it. Jennifer and Jack form a rivalry with Dave over baseball. Guest stars: Kerri Medders as Gwenny, Iman Benson as Reagan, Ricky Garcia as Cameron
7	7	"The Play, Part 2"	Jeff Melman	Todd Linden	March 23, 2018
Katie starts to ignore Alexa more and more, as she becomes focused on the play. Lori gives Katie life lessons during rehearsals, which annoys Jennifer to a great extent. Guest stars: Jack Griffo as Dylan, Nathaniel Potvin as Ryan, Katie Walder as Ms. Rogers, Alyssa Jirrels as Vanessa, Joy Luthman as Garth, Anthony Keyvan as Nathan, Leonard Robinson as Bennet
8	8	"Support Group"	Phill Lewis	Erin Wagoner	March 23, 2018
Katie starts to feel left out as Alexa, who is back in the hospital, is receiving support from her fellow cancer patients. Lori stresses over her care, and bakes a load of cookies to try to bribe the hospital nurse into giving Alexa special treatment. Guest stars: Nadja Alaya as Megan, Gus Kamp as Justin, Carmella Riley as Nurse Lynda, Eris Baker as Michelle, Avery Monsen as Nurse Chad, Gabriel Rissa as Scott
9	9	"Winter Luau"	Trevor Kirschner	Kamon Naddaf	March 23, 2018
Due to her low immune system Alexa is ordered to stay home, however she video-chats with Katie on an iPad to access her lessons. Jennifer gets upset when Jack asks Dave to go to his school career day instead of her. Guest stars: Jack Griffo as Dylan, Kerri Medders as Gwenny, Iman Benson as Reagan, Merit Leighton as Hannah, Jenica Bergere as Coach Winters, Alyssa Jirrels as Vanessa, Curran Walters as Gabriel, Scott Wordham as Barry, Roberta Valderrama as Ms. Walsh, Declan Whaley as Student #1, Christian J. Simon as Student #2, Eliza Pryor as Student #3, Isla Farris as Student #4, Antonio Raul Corbo as Student #5
10	10	"Thanksgiving"	Trevor Kirschner	Gary Murphy	March 23, 2018
Alexa cooks Thanksgiving dinner, however it does not take long for it to be ruined. Meanwhile, Katie tries to reconnect with her father, but gets upset when he continues to treat her like a little girl. Guest stars: Joe Regalbuto as Sam, Alan Ritchson as Robbie, Lee Garlington as Loretta, Jessica Lorez as Zoe
11	11	"Secret Sleepover"	Katy Garretson	Nancy Cohen	March 23, 2018
Dave and Lori take Lucas on a trip to pilot-school interviews, leaving Alexa at Jennifer's for the weekend. She and Katie get up to no good while they are gone. Ryan asks Katie to the winter formal. Guest stars: Jack Griffo as Dylan, Iman Benson as Reagan, Merit Leighton as Hannah, Nathaniel Potvin as Ryan, Scott Wordham as Barry, Nicole J. Butler as Alice, Mimi Cozzens as Cyndi
12	12	"Winter Formal, Part 1"	Andy Cadiff	Blake J. Williger	March 23, 2018
Jack takes a 'stray' cat under his wing, which Dave develops an allergic reaction to. While Dylan and Alexa try to get closer, Lucas persistently interrupts the two and tries to break them up. Guest stars: Jack Griffo as Dylan, Nathaniel Potvin as Ryan, Jason Boegh as Mr. Bradford
13	13	"Winter Formal, Part 2"	Andy Cadiff	Matthew Carlson	March 23, 2018
Alexa and Katie get ready for the Winter Formal. Alexa convinces Katie to ask Ryan to the dance, and Hannah tells everyone. Eventually, the news gets to Ryan, and he says yes before Katie can even ask him. On the day of the dance, they find out there is a flu outbreak, meaning Alexa cannot go. However Katie gets an idea which will allow Alexa to go; wearing a medical mask. Meanwhile, Jack tries to persuade Jennifer to get a puppy, and in the end, Jennifer adopts a rescue, who Jack names Potato. Upon entering the dance, Alexa finds everyone with masks, including Gwenny. Alexa dances with Dylan, and the two kiss. The episode ends with everyone dancing together to Katy Perry's "Firework". Guest stars: Jack Griffo as Dylan, Nathaniel Potvin as Ryan, Kerri Medders as Gwenny, Merit Leighton as Hannah, Iman Benson as Reagan, Alyssa Jirrels as Vanessa, Ricky Garcia as Cameron, Nadja Alaya as Megan, Cutter Garcia as Pizza Guy

=== Season 2 (2018) ===
No. overall	No. in season	Title	Directed by	Written by	Original release date
14	1	"Second First Day"	Trevor Kirschner	Heather Wordham	December 26, 2018
The Mendozas struggle to deal with Alexa's upcoming checkup as her and Katie's first day of sophomore year arrives. Guest stars: Kerri Medderrs as Gwenny, Merit Leighton as Hannah, Iman Benson as Reagan, Nathaniel James Potvin as Ryan, Gregg Daniel as Dr. Bretweiser, Jordan Austin Smith as Cody
15	2	"ChoreCats"	Trevor Kirschner	Nancy Cohen	December 26, 2018
Katie uses a job-giving app to pay for an acting program in London with Alexa's help. Elsewhere, Jennifer and Jack take a bet on who can stay away from their addictions, coffee and chocolate, the longest. Guest stars: Merit Leighton as Hannah, Iman Benson as Reagan, Nathaniel James Potvin as Ryan, Emily Happe as Mary, Joachim Powell as Owen, Jessica Pressley as Sadie, Brooke Renaud as Violet
16	3	"#GWENCAS"	Victor Gonzalez	Ray Lancon	December 26, 2018
After Katie's ChoreCats idea fails, she decides to apply for a job at Wired without telling Jennifer. Meanwhile, she and Alexa also try to sabotage Lucas's new relationship with Gwenny and Jack annoys Jennifer by tap dancing; resolved by eardefenders. Guest stars: Kerri Medders as Gwenny, Scott Wordham as Barry, Alyssa Gabrielle Rodriguez as Waitress
17	4	"Tryouts and Latte Doubts"	Victor Gonzalez	Todd Linden	December 26, 2018
Katie struggles on her first day working at Wired, and Alexa realizes that her cancer has affected her basketball skills. Katie eventually learns how to deal with rude customers and Alexa accepts her position on Junior Varsity. Guest stars: Kerri Medders as Gwenny, Jenica Bergere as Coach Winters, Scott Wordham as Barry, Jordan Austin Smith as Cody, Alyvia Alyn Lind as Sasha, Avery Monsen as Nurse Chad, Katherine Tokarz as Ruby, Liam Attridge as Steve
18	5	"PB Without J"	Katy Garretson	Eric Horsted	December 26, 2018
Alexa and Dylan begin fighting over Alexa's friendship with Katie. Katie attempts to fix this at a Halloween party, which leads to a disastrous break up. Guest stars: Kerri Medders as Gwenny, Merit Leighton as Hannah, Iman Benson as Reagan, Nathaniel James Potvin as Ryan, Scott Wordham as Barry, Jordan Austin Smith as Cody, Lance Valentine Butler as Lloyd, Jamie Zwick as Biker Guy
19	6	"Shop 'Til You Cry"	Katy Garretson	Blake J. Williger	December 26, 2018
Alexa bottles her sadness about her break up with Dylan in order to go dress shopping with Katie, Lori and Jennifer. She eventually breaks down, realizing that her first relationship is over. Dave also helps Lucas with dating advice. Guest stars: Kerri Medders as Gwenny, Victoria Kelleher as Saleswoman, Ashton Arbab as Aaron, Alexis Jayde Burnett as Kim, Jason Spisak as Video Game Announcer
20	7	"Katie's Beautiful Mind"	Jody Margolin Hahn	Nancy Cohen	December 26, 2018
Alexa faces Dylan for the first time since their break up on Halloween, and Katie struggles to study for her midterms whilst working at Wired. Elsewhere, Lucas decides to create a band with his classmates Cameron and Steve, much to Lori and Dave's dismay. Katie eventually tells her mom about her job. Guest stars: Merit Leighton as Hannah, Iman Benson as Reagan, Nathaniel James Potvin as Ryan, Scott Wordham as Barry, Ricky Garcia as Cameron, Liam Attriidge as Steve, Lilly Cornell Warriner as Sue, Duane Ervin as Boy #1, James Blakely as Boy #2
21	8	"The Ghost of Cancer Past"	Victor Gonzalez	Julia Miranda	December 26, 2018
It's Christmas and Lori decides to do secret Santa. Jennifer gets Lori and does not know what to get for her. Alexa finds her old cancer bag and remembers when she first found out she had cancer. Guest stars: Nathaniel James Potvin as Ryan, Gregg Daniel as Dr. Breitweiser, Nadja Alaya as Megan
22	9	"New Year's ... Whoops"	Kelly Park	Erin Wagoner	December 26, 2018
Lori struggles to beat Dave and Jennifer during New Year's Eve activities with her naive partner, Jack. Elsewhere, Katie finally gains the courage to tell Ryan about her feelings for him, until she accidentally destroys Wired's coffee machine. Guest stars: Merit Leighton as Hannah, Iman Benson as Reagan, Nathaniel James Potvin as Ryan, Scott Wordham as Barry, Jordan Austin Smith as Cody, Anthony Keyvan as Nathan, Lilly Cornell as Warriner as Sue
23	10	"Sweet Sixteen"	Trevor Kirschner	Ray Lancon	December 26, 2018
In the aftermath of the coffee machine incident, Katie ends up using all the money she saved up for the London trip. She decides not to tell Alexa as she's scared it will ruin her Sweet 16. Jennifer and Jack decide to fake sick to avoid going to work and school, respectively, for one last day after the holidays. Lucas is having trouble writing lyrics with his bandmates, especially when Gwenny returns from her holiday vacation. Alexa finds out about Katie, so she decides to cancel her Sweet 16 venue and move the party to her house. The refund from the cancellation is enough to fund Katie's London trip. Lucas's band performs, Megan shows up, Dylan and Alexa settle on good terms, and Katie reveals her feelings to Ryan. Guest stars: Kerri Medders as Gwenny, Merit Leighton as Hannah, Iman Benson as Reagan, Nathaniel James Potvin as Ryan, Scott Wordham as Barry, Jordan Austin Smith as Cody, Ricky Garcia as Cameron, Liam Attridge as Steve, Nadja Alaya as Megan, Anthony Keyvan as Nathan, Jessica Leigh Gonzales as Repairwoman, Nathan Frizzel as Brian, John Lee Ames as Gerald

=== Season 3 (2019–20) ===
No. overall	No. in season	Title	Directed by	Written by	Original release date
Part 1
24	1	"1st Day of Junior Year"	Trevor Kirschner	Heather Wordham	December 30, 2019
Alexa and Katie are with Dr. Corts to talk about their argument, they recap the episode: Lucas goes to college until he gets kicked out for starting a fire. Dave and Lori celebrate their 20th anniversary and Dave promises to make Lori a gazebo, (which he continues to work on throughout the season). Alexa and Katie are happy it’s the first day of 11th grade and Gwenny befriends Alexa. Alexa does not know what to write for her personal essay for college. Dave, Lori and her friends (including Gwenny for the rest of the season) say she should write about her having cancer but Alexa declines. Alexa and Katie argue after pretending to drive, showing the fight was about nothing and that they were just burnt out after their first day. Alexa tells Dr. Corts she does not want to write it on cancer because she is more than just that, and Katie tells her she's anxious about not getting into the same college as Alexa. Guest stars: Kerri Medders as Gwenny, Merit Leighton as Hannah, Iman Benson as Reagan, Constance Marie as Dr. Corts, Nathaniel James Potvin as Ryan, Jordan Austin Smith as Cody
25	2	"Stupid Binder"	Gloria Calderón Kellett	Nancy Cohen	December 30, 2019
The family is excited for Alexa's final treatment appointment. While at the hospital Alexa meets Spencer in the gift shop and they exchange numbers. At her appointment Alexa is very upset to learn she has only upgraded to patient-centered care and will continue to needs check ups. Spencer later texts Alexa telling her that he has cancer. Meanwhile Katie wants the main role of Emily in the play Our Town, but also wants to join Peggy's study group, she ends up getting both but the study group has conflicting times with play practice, so she ends up picking a smaller part for the play so she can do both. At home Lucas is inspired by Alexa's doctors and wants to get into pre-med and Jennifer has started online dating.
26	3	"Always Something There to Remind Me"	Victor Gonzalez	Ray Lancon	December 30, 2019
Alexa has been keeping in contact with Spencer and does not want to date him as she believes he just needs a friend. She later meets him at the hospital to support him though chemotherapy and is reminded of her time in chemo. By the time he gets his port flushed it becomes too much for her and she leaves. Meanwhile Katie hopes to join Hannah clean up the park as she wants to demonstrate leadership skills for her college resume, but ends up taking Jack to taekwondo practice, and tries to get a job there with no experience. She later becomes the assistant manager at Wired. Back at home Lucas continues singing while studying leading his parents to think he has not learned anything, until he starts singing things about the human body. Jennifer practices her dating skills on Dave and Lori.
27	4	"Unconsciously Coupling"	Trevor Kirschner	Grant Levy & Dominik Rothbard	December 30, 2019
Alexa is looking forward to getting her drivers licence and is upset when she fails the test. She talks to Spencer about it over the phone and learns it's more than just driving – it's freedom. So she gets more driving practice with Dave and accidentally breaks the gazebo he was creating for Lori. Meanwhile, Katie has gotten bored of her boyfriend, but is scared to break up with him because she does not want to hurt his feelings. However, she does not realize he has been feeling the exact same way. She accidentally invites him over and they break up without hurting each other's feelings and remain friends. At home Lucas has been in the flow of studying. Dave, Lori and Brian (the party planner from “Sweet Sixteen”) plan a retirement party for one of Dave’s coworkers. Dave tells Lori she should be Brian’s assistant, as Lori has been bored of her Job.
28	5	"All I Want for Christmas is You"	Jody Margolin Hahn	Leo Chu & Eric S. Garcia	December 30, 2019
It's Christmas and Alexa is looking forward to seeing Dylan for the first time since he left for Stanford. She checks on Spencer first and he seems distracted while wearing a baseball cap. When Alexa meets up with Dylan she realizes he had changed at school. When he gifts her a Stanford baseball cap she realizes Spencer's losing his hair. She goes back to his house to give him a silk pillow case and helps him shave his head. They almost kiss. Meanwhile Katie is hosting a canned food drive at Wired for her college resume and struggles to hangout with her friends. Later she meets Aiden for the first time. She later wins the bet to make Barry laugh by falling over the cans. Lori has been coming home late because of her new job so the family begins to decorate without her. Jennifer chooses to miss her date to join Dave and Jack build a train set because she's scared to get back into the dating game. When Lori comes home she sees they have all waited for her so they can continue decorating as a family.
29	6	"Writer-Director-Nervous Wreck"	Victor Gonzalez	Lucas Brown Eyes	December 30, 2019
Alexa and Katie are competing in a play competition; instead of performing a play that already exists, Katie wants to write it herself for her college resume. Her friends' arguments over roles become so stressful that she rewrites the play numerous times. After Gwenny quits last minute, Hannah takes her role, but things continue to go badly. Alexa needs to see Spencer at the hospital, so Katie takes her place and provides Hannah with a script so she can remember her lines and things start going better. Even so, their team comes last out of three. At home, Lucas receives Bs on his report card and is told they are not good enough to become a doctor. This upsets him and he decides pre-med is not for him. Dave, Lori and Jennifer are annoyed their things are missing for the play.
30	7	"It's Just... Weird"	Kelly Park	Romi Barta	December 30, 2019
Alexa has been nervous to introduce Spencer to her friends and family before he comes to Wired and then attends her basketball game. Lori invites him over for dinner and while he's there Spencer explains to Jack that he does not have Leukemia like Alexa, but instead Hodgkin's lymphoma. As he talks about his cancer Alexa leaves the table and goes into the backyard. Spencer joins her in the gazebo and tells her that he should have kissed her after she shaved her head. Alexa tells him that she only wants to be friends and Spencer leaves, disappointed. Katie thinks her mom has gotten into a relationship via her dating app and investigates if it's Gwenny’s dad. After finding out it was not him she confronts Jennifer at the dinner table and learns her mom has been talking to a school board member named Mike about a new position as the counselor at Alexa and Katie's school.
31	8	"Panic! At The Putt-Putt"	Trevor Kirschner	Eric Horsted	December 30, 2019
Alexa and Katie decide to go Minigolfing to get their minds off their upcoming SAT and Spencer's lack of communication with Alexa since the night in her backyard. While at the mini golf place, Katie runs into Aiden and Alexa into Spencer. He tells her that he can accept being friends, but Alexa kisses him instead. After they make up, Alexa and Spencer see Aiden encouraging Katie to break the golf course as a form of stress management. Before the SAT, Katie has a panic attack, causing her and Alexa to miss the test. Meanwhile, Jennifer is having some trouble with her sliding door and gets a handyman named Joe Perry from Yelp to fix it. Finding herself attracted to him, Lori starts purposefully breaking things at her house to get him to stay around longer. Joe and Jennifer realize they have plenty in common and Joe ends up asking Jennifer on a date.
Part 2
32	9	"Last First Day"	Erika Kaestle	Julia Miranda	June 13, 2020
Alexa and Katie are excited for the start of senior year. While setting up their new lockers, we learn Alexa has started dating Spencer. When decorating the Douglas Wellard statue, Katie confesses to Alexa that she has been extra "amped up" to make the it their best last-first-day; when they started freshman year together, Katie did not know if Alexa would make it to senior year. They get pizza and wish lanterns to commemorate and remember their previous first days. Jennifer is nervous about becoming the school counselor and cuts Jack's hair badly. While at school, she struggles to make friends with the other teachers and hides in the bathroom. Alexa and Katie's wish lanterns set off the sprinklers, and Principal Trugly encourages Jennifer to suspend them for a week because it “feels good.” Lori and Dave have decided make Lucas more independent by making him learn how to do house chores. Jack agrees to teach him after Lucas offers to fix Jack's hair.
33	10	"Rules for Better Barista-ing"	Jody Margolin Hahn	Heather Wordham & Grant Levy & Dominik Rothbard	June 13, 2020
Alexa has gotten her driver's license. Spencer joins his college basketball team after Alexa supports him, but she worries he is receiving special treatment after a video about “Cancer Guy” making the team is released. After talking, Spencer says it does upset him, but he chooses to look at the positives instead—such as a new relationship. Katie needs to write an essay on an accomplishment for a scholarship. She also needs to teach a new Wired employee, who ends up being Aiden, to Katie’s dismay. Aiden's success at latte making leads to them getting along and cooperating on her essay. Lori is tasked with planning Brian’s party, but he invites more people last minute, causing the caterer to quit. The family is forced to prepare the food, but Lucas is self-taught at cooking and Jack needs glasses. Regardless, they end up enjoying the food for themselves after Brian cancels. For her work Brian gives Lori a partnership she hoped for.
34	11	"The Girl Who Cried Yelp"	Jody Margolin Hahn	Nancy Cohen & Ray Lancon	June 13, 2020
Alexa and Katie have finished the SATs and Jack now has glasses. Jenifer invites Joe over for dinner so he can meet the family, but Katie worries things are going too fast. Her worry increases when Jenifer invites Joe to Katie’s production of, Taming of the Shrew. To prove his fine they check his Yelp reviews and find one claiming Joe robbed a video store owner, they check the store to see if it’s true only to find a stuck-up old lady who thinks everything new is bad. Katie learns change is ok and goes back home. Joe fixes something Jake broke then teaches Jack not to keep secrets from his mother. Lori and Dave come on too strong on Joe, but in the end he did not mind. Jennifer ultimately thanks Katie for adjusting to the changes.
35	12	"Choose Your Own Adventure"	Erika Kaestle	Joshua Grossman & Nathan Frizzell	June 13, 2020
Everyone else knows what college major to study except Alexa. Jennifer suggests taking an online test to figure it out, and after receiving "interior designer" Alexa practices her skills on Katie’s bedroom. The result is well-done, but Alexa decides she would not want it as a career. Her parents later support her by telling her no matter what she does it will be amazing. Katie does remarkably as the main character in Taming of the Shrew, her last play before graduation. She tells her therapist about it and mentions she does not have anxiety when performing. Later, when closing Wired, she almost has a panic attack but is distracted by Aiden. While originallu planning on majoring in business, Katie changes her mind and applies for acting. The Mendozas are staying with the Coopers all week while Joe replaces their countertops. Jennifer slowly grows agitated but is surprised when Joe announces that he has finished early. The new countertops look suspiciously like the old ones.
36	13	"Speaking of Cancer"	Kelly Park	Leo Chu & Eric S. Garcia & Julia Miranda	June 13, 2020
Lori is planning a Stand Up to Cancer fundraiser and Katie agrees to give a speech. During the event she often avoids writing the speech and spends more time tying to win raffle tickets for Katie. In the end she still cannot stand the idea of being identified with cancer, so Lori gives a speech, but Alexa also joins in at the end, after leaning that cancer affects everyone in her life and not just her. Katie gets jealous of Aiden, hanging out with another girl at a Skee-Ball game instead of helping the Wired cart at the fundraiser, after speaking to Alexa she figures out she might have a crush on him. It turns out he was also winning tickets and wins her the Macbook she wanted. Lucus keeps humming in his headset. The entertainer was late so Lucus performs a song for the kids, and realised he missed singing. Jennifer has been lying to the kids about her and them being allergic to shellfish, for cost saving measures, and tries to eat as much as possible without them knowing, but it’s not long till Jack finds out.
37	14	"The Smoke Show"	Phill Lewis	Nancy Cohen & Lucas Brown Eyes	June 13, 2020
Alexa and Katie are excited they got into University of North Carolina. At Wired, Alexa meets Spencer to tell him, but he does not seem interested because he's busting to use the bathroom and she forgets to tell him about dinner. Alexa and Katie wonder if he would break up with Alexa if she's gone. Spencer notices shes been acting weird. After eating someone else's brisket Dave is eager to try making some himself, so he buys a smoker and cooks for 16 hours. Spencer joins when it's ready, Alexa tells him she was acting crazy because she would not want to be without him. Jenifer’s selling stuff to afford Katie going to college to keep her mind of her leaving. The girls realize this could also be why Jack has been so grumpy.
38	15	"Last Dance"	Kelly Park	Ray Lancon & Romi Barta	June 13, 2020
39	16	"This Feels Right"	Kelly Park	Eric Horsted & Grant Levy & Dominik Rothbard	June 13, 2020
The girls have graduated high school and started university, though not at the same school. The series ends with them returning home for the Thanksgiving holiday during their freshman year.

== Awards ==
In 2018, Alexa & Katie was nominated for the Primetime Emmy Award for Outstanding Children's Program. In 2019, the series was recognised at the 12th Television Academy Honors. The show won Favorite Kids TV Show at the 2021 Kids' Choice Awards.
