= Cigarette Smoke =

- "Walk in the Park" limited-edition vinyl cover

Promotional single by Olivia Rodrigo

from the album You Seem Pretty Sad for a Girl So in Love
- A-side: "Honeybee"
- Released: June 12, 2026
- Length: 5:40 (original version); 5:10 (album vinyl/cassette version)
- Label: Geffen
- Songwriters: Olivia Rodrigo; Dan Nigro
- Producer: Dan Nigro

Lyric video
- "Cigarette Smoke" on YouTube

"Cigarette Smoke" (stylized in all lowercase) is a song by the American singer-songwriter Olivia Rodrigo from her third studio album, You Seem Pretty Sad for a Girl So in Love. Rodrigo wrote it with its producer, Dan Nigro. The song became available as the album's 13th track on June 12, 2026, when it was released by Geffen Records.

== Background ==
In March 2026, Olivia Rodrigo described the thematic direction of her third album in an interview with British Vogue. She stated that the album predominantly features "sad love songs", explaining that many of her favorite romantic tracks derive their appeal from an undercurrent of fear or longing. The album takes inspiration from Rodrigo's time in London. Multiple tracks on the album are said to reference the relationship of Sex and the City characters Miranda Hobbes and Steve Brady. On April 2, 2026, the album title was unveiled after being painted on a pink wall in Los Angeles and hinted with the final word in the album title in many cities. Rodrigo continued her collaboration with Dan Nigro, who returned to be the album's producer. Rodrigo released "Drop Dead" as the lead single on April 17, 2026. A second song from the album, called "Begged", was performed on Saturday Night Live on May 2, 2026.

Speaking of the album's conception and the influence of Sex and the City on the tracks, Rodrigo stated: "Like, when Miranda and Steve are getting back together, she's crying. 'Steve, anytime something funny happens, I just want to tell you.' And I remember watching that and being like, 'Oh, my God, I have to write a song about this'".

== Composition ==
"Cigarette Smoke" is 5 minutes and 40 seconds long. Nigro produced and engineered the song, programming it alongside Bryn Bliska. Nigro provided drum programming and the string arrangement and played acoustic guitar, bass, guitar, and piano; and Paul Cartwright provided the string arrangement and played the viola and violin. Nigro mixed the song, and Randy Merrill mastered it.

== Critical reception ==
Ranking it as the second-best song on You Seem Pretty Sad for a Girl in Love, Billboard's Hannah Dailey wrote: "This song does not have the most clever or poetic lyrics on the album, but it does feel the most honest. Despite its title, “Cigarette Smoke” is both the deepest breath Rodrigo takes throughout the entire album as well as the most striking moment of clarity she has."

== Credits and personnel ==
Credits are adapted from the liner notes of You Seem Pretty Sad for a Girl So in Love.

- Dan Nigro – producer, songwriter, engineer, mixing, acoustic guitar, bass, drum programming, guitar, piano, string arrangement, programming, background vocals
- Olivia Rodrigo – vocals, background vocals, songwriter
- Paul Cartwright – string arrangement, viola, violin
- Bryn Bliska – programming
- Randy Merrill – mastering

== Charts ==
Chart positions for "Cigarette Smoke"
Chart (2026)	Peak position
Australia (ARIA)	22
Canada Hot 100 (Billboard)	30
Global 200 (Billboard)	27
New Zealand (Recorded Music NZ)	25
Singapore (RIAS)	28
UK Streaming (OCC)	38
US Billboard Hot 100	27
US Hot Rock & Alternative Songs (Billboard)	9
