= High School Musical: The Musical: The Series: The Soundtrack =

2020 soundtrack album

Soundtrack album by Cast of High School Musical: The Musical: The Series
- Released: January 3, 2020
- Recorded: February–June 2019
- Genres: Pop; teen pop; musical theatre
- Label: Walt Disney

High School Musical chronology
| Sharpay's Fabulous Adventure (2011) | High School Musical: The Musical: The Series: The Soundtrack (2020) | High School Musical: The Musical: The Holiday Special: The Soundtrack (2020) |

High School Musical: The Musical: The Series: The Soundtrack: Music from the Disney+ Original Series is the soundtrack album for the first season of the streaming television series High School Musical: The Musical: The Series, which was released on January 3, 2020, by Walt Disney Records. The program itself was first distributed on streaming service Disney+ on November 12, 2019; following a preview simulcast on ABC, Disney Channel and Freeform on November 8, 2019.

The soundtrack for the series features new songs and renditions of songs from the original High School Musical film.

== Background and composition ==
Series creator Tim Federle originally pitched High School Musical: The Musical: The Series for Disney+ with the idea of developing original songs to complement the franchise's back catalogue. The first season contains ten original songs, with one new piece of music featured in each episode.

=== Composition ===
The soundtrack features new recordings of songs from the original High School Musical film; "Start of Something New", "What I've Been Looking For", "Breaking Free", "Stick to the Status Quo", "Bop to the Top", "When There Was Me and You" and "We're All in This Together". The songs were "revamped" for the series. Steve Vincent, who worked on the original films, served as the musical supervisor for the series and sourced several composers to write new music. He also received submissions from songwriters based in Los Angeles. Cast member Olivia Rodrigo wrote an original song for the series, "All I Want"; and co-wrote "Just for a Moment" with Joshua Bassett and music producer, Dan Book.

Lucas Grabeel, who played Ryan Evans in the original films, appears as featured artist in the song "Role of a Lifetime" alongside cast member Kate Reinders. Federle confirmed that a cast member from the original film would make a cameo appearance in the series through a fantasy sequence.

Kelly Lawler of USA Today suggested that the original songs echo "2019 high-energy pop music", referring to "I Think I Kinda, You Know" and "Wondering".

=== Songs and lyrical content ===
The song "I Think I Kinda, You Know" details the relationship between characters Nini and Ricky. Rodrigo elaborated, "it was the song that Nini played for Ricky before they broke up." "Wondering" is a piano duet performed in-series by Nini and Ashlyn, written to potentially be included in their version of the musical. The lyrics relate to Nini's romantic involvement with Ricky and E.J. "Born to Be Brave" is described an "empowering" track resembling "We're All in This Together" from the original film. "A Billion Sorrys" is a song written by E.J. in the series as an apology to Nini for stealing her phone and reading her messages.

== Promotion ==
=== Release ===
The first song from the soundtrack, "The Medley, the Mashup" was released as a promotional single on November 1, 2019, with an accompanying music video on the DisneyMusicVEVO YouTube account. The track is presented as a mashup of the original film's songs.

Pre-orders for the soundtrack were opened on November 8, 2019. In the lead-up to the album's release, selected tracks were made available weekly to correlate with the episodes being distributed. After the preview telecast of the series, the songs "I Think I Kinda, You Know" (Duet) and "Start of Something New" (Nini Version) were released. On November 12, "Wondering" was released at the same time as the program's Disney+ premiere. This was followed by "A Billion Sorrys", which was added to the pre-release on November 19, and the release of "What I've Been Looking For" (Nini & E.J. Version) and "All I Want" on November 26. "Born to Be Brave" was made available on December 3, followed by "When There was Me and You" (Ricky Version) and "Truth, Justice and Songs in Our Key" on December 10, and "Out of the Old" on December 17. On December 24, "Role of a Lifetime" was released, while "Just for a Moment" and the performance versions of "Get'cha Head in the Game" and "Stick to the Status Quo" were added to the soundtrack on December 31.

=== Live performances ===
The cast of High School Musical: The Musical: The Series performed "Start of Something New" and "We're All in This Together" at D23 Expo on August 23, 2019 and on Good Morning America on November 8, 2019.

== Reception ==
Megan Vick of TV Guide commended Rodrigo and Julia Lester's vocal abilities in the song "Wondering".

== Track listing ==
High School Musical: The Musical: The Series track listing
| No. | Title | Writer(s) | Performer(s) | Length |
|---|---|---|---|---|
| 1. | "I Think I Kinda, You Know" (Nini Version) | Michael Weiner; Alan Zachary | Olivia Rodrigo | 1:16 |
| 2. | "Start of Something New" (Nini Version) | Matthew Gerrard; Robbie Nevil | Rodrigo | 1:41 |
| 3. | "I Think I Kinda, You Know" (Ricky Version) | Weiner; Zachary | Joshua Bassett | 1:57 |
| 4. | "Start of Something New" (E.J. Version) | Gerrard; Nevil | Matt Cornett | 0:36 |
| 5. | "Start of Something New" (Gina Version) | Gerrard; Nevil | Sofia Wylie | 1:18 |
| 6. | "I Think I Kinda, You Know" (Duet) | Weiner; Zachary | Rodrigo; Bassett | 2:52 |
| 7. | "Wondering" | Josh Cumbee; Jordan Powers | Rodrigo; Julia Lester | 3:45 |
| 8. | "Wondering" (Ashlyn & Nini Piano Version) | Cumbee; Powers | Rodrigo; Lester | 2:30 |
| 9. | "Stick to the Status Quo" (Rehearsal) | David Lawrence; Faye Greenberg | Cast of High School Musical: The Musical: The Series | 0:43 |
| 10. | "A Billion Sorrys" | Jeannie Lurie; Gabriel Mann | Cornett | 1:48 |
| 11. | "What I've Been Looking For" (Nini & E.J. Version) | Andy Dodd; Adam Watts | Rodrigo; Cornett | 2:05 |
| 12. | "All I Want" | Rodrigo | Rodrigo | 2:57 |
| 13. | "Bop to the Top" (Nini & Kourtney Version) | Randy Petersen; Kevin Quinn | Rodrigo; Dara Reneé | 0:35 |
| 14. | "Born to Be Brave" | Tova Litvin; Doug Rockwell | Cast of High School Musical: The Musical: The Series | 3:09 |
| 15. | "When There Was Me and You" (Ricky Version) | Jamie Houston | Bassett | 1:38 |
| 16. | "Truth, Justice and Songs in Our Key" | Lurie; Mann | Cast of High School Musical: The Musical: The Series | 2:17 |
| 17. | "Out of the Old" | Cumbee; Powers | Rodrigo | 2:48 |
| 18. | "Role of a Lifetime" | Lurie; Mann | Kate Reinders; Lucas Grabeel | 3:07 |
| 19. | "Get'cha Head in the Game" | Raymond Cham; Greg Cham; Andrew Seeley | Cast of High School Musical: The Musical: The Series | 2:21 |
| 20. | "Stick to the Status Quo" (Performance) | Lawrence; Greenberg | Cast of High School Musical: The Musical: The Series | 1:57 |
| 21. | "Just For A Moment" | Bassett; Rodrigo; Dan Book | Rodrigo; Bassett | 3:17 |
| 22. | "Breaking Free" (Nini, Ricky & E.J. Version) | Houston | Rodrigo; Bassett; Cornett | 2:37 |
| 23. | "We're All in This Together" (Cast) | Gerrard; Nevil | Cast of High School Musical: The Musical: The Series | 3:52 |
| 24. | "We're All in This Together" (Curtain Call) | Gerrard; Nevil | Cast of High School Musical: The Musical: The Series | 2:26 |
| 25. | "I Think I Kinda, You Know" (Acoustic Video Version) | Weiner; Zachary | Cast of High School Musical: The Musical: The Series | 2:48 |
| 26. | "Wondering" (Acoustic Video Version) | Cumbee; Powers | Cast of High School Musical: The Musical: The Series | 3:42 |
| 27. | "Born to Be Brave" (Acoustic Video Version) | Litvin; Rockwell | Cast of High School Musical: The Musical: The Series | 3:24 |
| 28. | "We're All in This Together" (Acoustic Video Version) | Gerrard; Nevil | Cast of High School Musical: The Musical: The Series | 3:51 |
| 29. | "The Medley, the Mashup" | Raymond Cham; Greg Cham; Gerrard; Greenberg; Houston; Lawrence; Nevil; Seeley | Cast of High School Musical: The Musical: The Series | 2:57 |
| 30. | "We're All in This Together" (Wildcat Chant) | Gerrard; Nevil | Cast of High School Musical: The Musical: The Series | 0:35 |
| Total length: | | | | 1:10:44 |

High School Musical: The Musical: The Series digital release additional tracks
| No. | Title | Writer(s) | Length |
|---|---|---|---|
| 31. | "Bop to the Top" (Instrumental) | Petersen; Quinn | 1:36 |
| 32. | "Stick to the Status Quo" (Instrumental) | Lawrence; Greenberg | 0:33 |
| 33. | "I Think I Kinda, You Know" (Instrumental) | Weiner; Zachary | 2:52 |
| 34. | "Wondering" (Instrumental) | Cumbee; Powers | 3:44 |
| 35. | "A Billion Sorrys" (Instrumental) | Jeannie Lurie; Gabriel Mann | 1:48 |
| 36. | "All I Want" (Instrumental) | Rodrigo | 2:56 |
| 37. | "Born to Be Brave" (Instrumental) | Litvin; Rockwell | 3:09 |
| 38. | "Truth, Justice and Songs in Our Key" (Instrumental) | Lurie; Mann | 2:16 |
| 39. | "Out of the Old" (Instrumental) | Cumbee; Powers | 2:48 |
| 40. | "Role of a Lifetime" (Instrumental) | Lurie; Mann | 3:07 |
| 41. | "Just For A Moment" (Instrumental) | Bassett; Dan Book; Rodrigo | 3:18 |
| Total length: | | | 1:38:51 |

== Charts ==
=== Weekly charts ===
Weekly chart performance for High School Musical: The Musical: The Series
| Chart (2020–2021) | Peak position |
|---|---|
| Australian Digital Albums (ARIA) | 22 |
| Canadian Albums (Billboard) | 38 |
| UK Compilation Albums (Official Charts) | 25 |
| US Billboard 200 | 31 |
| US Soundtrack Albums (Billboard) | 2 |

=== Year-end charts ===
Year-end chart performance for High School Musical: The Musical: The Series
| Chart (2021) | Position |
|---|---|
| US Soundtrack Albums (Billboard) | 21 |

== Certifications ==
Certifications and sales for High School Musical: The Musical: The Series: The Soundtrack
| Region | Certification | Certified units/sales |
|---|---|---|
| United States (RIAA) | Gold | 500,000^{‡} |
^{‡} Sales+streaming figures based on certification alone.

== See also ==
- High School Musical (soundtrack)
