= All I Want (Olivia Rodrigo song) =

2019 song by Olivia Rodrigo

- "Love That Lasts Mix" cover

Promotional single by Olivia Rodrigo

from the album High School Musical: The Musical: The Series: The Soundtrack
- Released: November 27, 2019
- Genre: Pop
- Length: 2:57
- Label: Walt Disney
- Songwriter: Olivia Rodrigo
- Producer: Matthew Tishler

Music video
- "All I Want" on YouTube

"All I Want" is a song written by American singer and songwriter Olivia Rodrigo for the mockumentary television series High School Musical: The Musical: The Series. It was performed by Rodrigo's character, Nina "Nini" Salazar-Roberts, in the fourth episode of the first season, "Blocking", which premiered on Disney+ on November 29, 2019. A ballad with piano and strings, "All I Want" was written in three days while Rodrigo was filming the first season. The song was produced by Matthew Tishler and recorded live for the episode during filming. It was released on November 27, 2019, through Walt Disney Records as a promotional single from the album High School Musical: The Musical: The Series: The Soundtrack.

Despite not being promoted as a radio single, "All I Want" was a minor hit; it debuted on the U.S. Billboard Hot 100 at number 90 in January 2020, mainly due to downloads. It was a trend on the social media platform TikTok and has been certified 3× Platinum by the Recording Industry Association of America—this success led to a contract with Interscope Records and the release of Rodrigo's debut single, "Drivers License", in 2021. "All I Want" is the most successful song from High School Musical: The Musical: The Series, and has been described as Rodrigo's "breakout hit".

== Composition ==
It's basically about Nini and, kind of, her boy troubles. She just found out that E.J. really betrayed her and did something really untrustworthy, so she's just grappling with that, and also looking back on her relationship with Ricky. I think it's a very relatable concept, at least for me.

— Olivia Rodrigo, on the song.

"All I Want" is a pop ballad featuring piano and string instruments. The song's arrangement was described as "traditional, [1970s], singer-songwriter style, with a sprinkle of showtune sparkle". In an episode of Verified by Genius, Rodrigo explained that the line "Is it something wrong with me?" came from a conversation with her mother about relationships. According to sheet music published by Hal Leonard LLC, "All I Want" is a moderately slow composition in E-flat major–later modulating to F major–with a mixed meter of alternating 3/4 and 4/4.

== Promotion ==
External videos
- "All I Want", Rodrigo's performance from High School Musical: The Musical: The Series, which was recorded live.

The scene with Rodrigo performing "All I Want" on High School Musical: The Musical: The Series was released to YouTube on the same day as its episode release. A number of videos were additionally released via Disney Music's Vevo channel, including a lyric video, an alternate video, and a live studio performance. Rodrigo performed the song on Live with Kelly and Ryan in February 2020, and for Z100 New York the following month. She also performed the song on the ukulele for Disney Channel's Summer Sing-Along on July 10, 2020.

A music video for "All I Want" was released on March 20, 2020, featuring Rodrigo playing a piano in a pink tulle dress with mountains in the background, accompanied by a string quartet. Directed by Stephen Wayne Mallett, it was filmed at the Bonneville Salt Flats in Wendover, Utah. A making-of for the music video and an American Sign Language version were also released.

Julia Lester covered "All I Want" as part of the #HSMTMTSCoverChallenge, where the cast members of High School Musical: The Musical: The Series covered songs originally performed by other characters. "All I Want" was also covered by a cappella group DCappella, and included on the track listing of their Japan-exclusive album All Ears, released in June 2020.

== Commercial performance ==
"All I Want" debuted on the U.S. Billboard Hot 100 at number 90 in January 2020, and stayed on the chart for two weeks. The song was not promoted as a radio single and its appearance on the chart was attributed mainly to download sales. As of September 2023, "All I Want" was Rodrigo's only Hot 100 entry to have never entered the top 40. It has been certified 3× Platinum in the US by the RIAA for 3,000,000 units. The success of Rodrigo's debut single "Drivers License" in early 2021 led to a resurgence of "All I Want" internationally, with a position of 119 on the Billboard Global 200 chart for the week ending January 30. The song reached number 32 on the UK Singles Chart and number 16 on the Irish Singles Chart.

== Track listing ==
Digital download
No.	Title	Length
1.	"All I Want"	2:57

Digital download
No.	Title	Length
1.	"All I Want" (Live at Vevo)	2:46

Digital download
No.	Title	Length
1.	"All I Want" (Love That Lasts Mix)	2:55

== Credits and personnel ==
Credits adapted from Tidal.

- Matthew Tishler – producer
- Olivia Rodrigo – vocals, composer, lyricist

== Charts ==
Weekly chart performance for "All I Want"
Chart (2019–2021)	Peak position
Belgium (Ultratip Bubbling Under Flanders)	–
Canada Hot 100 (Billboard)	78
Global 200 (Billboard)	119
Ireland (IRMA)	16
New Zealand Hot Singles (RMNZ)	19
Portugal (AFP)	111
Sweden (Sverigetopplistan)	88
UK Singles (Official Charts)	32
US Billboard Hot 100	90
US Kid Digital Song Sales (Billboard)	4

== Certifications ==
Certifications for "All I Want"
Region	Certification	Certified units/sales
Australia (ARIA)	3× Platinum	210,000^{‡}
Brazil (Pro-Música Brasil)	Diamond	160,000^{‡}
Canada (Music Canada)	4× Platinum	320,000^{‡}
Denmark (IFPI Danmark)	Platinum	90,000^{‡}
France (SNEP)	Gold	100,000^{‡}
New Zealand (RMNZ)	2× Platinum	60,000^{‡}
Norway (IFPI Norway)	Platinum	60,000^{‡}
Poland (ZPAV)	Gold	25,000^{‡}
Portugal (AFP)	Gold	5,000^{‡}
Spain (Promusicae)	Gold	30,000^{‡}
United Kingdom (BPI)	Platinum	600,000^{‡}
United States (RIAA)	3× Platinum	3,000,000^{‡}
Streaming
Sweden (GLF)	Gold	4,000,000^{†}
^{‡} Sales+streaming figures based on certification alone.^{†} Streaming-only figures based on certification alone.
