= Guts World Tour =

2024–2025 concert tour by Olivia Rodrigo

- Tour by Olivia Rodrigo
- Promotional poster
- Location: Asia; Australia; Europe; North America; South America
- Associated album: Guts
- Start date: February 23, 2024
- End date: July 1, 2025
- Legs: 6
- No. of shows: 102
- Supporting acts: Chappell Roan; The Breeders; Remi Wolf; PinkPantheress; Benee; Beabadoobee; St. Vincent; Florence Road
- Attendance: 1.6 million (101 shows)
- Box office: $208.6 million (101 shows)

Olivia Rodrigo concert chronology
- Sour Tour (2022); Guts World Tour (2024–2025); The Unraveled Tour (2026–2027)

The Guts World Tour was the second concert tour by American singer-songwriter Olivia Rodrigo, in support of her second studio album, Guts (2023). It began on February 23, 2024, at Acrisure Arena in Thousand Palms, United States, and concluded on July 1, 2025, at Co-op Live in Manchester, England, comprising 102 shows across North America, Europe, Asia, Australia, and Brazil. The Breeders, Chappell Roan, PinkPantheress, Remi Wolf, Benee, Beabadoobee, St. Vincent, and Florence Road served as supporting acts.

It was Rodrigo's first all-arena concert tour, after her debut tour was scheduled at intimate venues such as theaters and auditoriums. The set list consisted primarily of songs from Guts, in addition to some from Sour (2021). In line with the promoted album's themes, the show's nature was inspired by rock-driven music, more specifically by girl rock and riot grrrl live concerts. A brief 2025 extension billed as Guts World Tour: Spilled was headlined at stadiums.

The tour was met with highly positive reviews from critics, who praised Rodrigo's stage presence, vocals, and the pace of the show. It also experienced commercial success, being attended by 1.6 million people and grossing US$209.1 million from 101 shows, becoming the highest-grossing tour by an act born in the 21st century. Rodrigo's August 2024 shows at Intuit Dome in Inglewood were recorded for a television special, which was released on Netflix on October 29, 2024.

== Background and development ==
Olivia Rodrigo's second studio album, Guts, was released on September 8, 2023. The album and its cover art were announced on June 26, 2023, before the release of the lead single, "Vampire", and preorders began the same day. The album's track listing was teased on July 31, leading fans to search for clues, and the following day, Rodrigo revealed the titles of the album's twelve tracks. On September 7, she released a trailer for Guts on YouTube, wherein the titles of the album's four bonus tracks were revealed. Furthermore, three singles were released in promotion of Guts in 2023: "Vampire" on June 30; "Bad Idea Right?" on August 11; and "Get Him Back!" on September 15. A bonus track titled "Obsessed" was released as the album's fourth single on March 22, 2024.

Prior to the tour's official announcement, it was teased via social media by both Rodrigo and the venues that she was set to perform on a new series of concerts. Rodrigo announced the first set of dates for the Guts World Tour on September 13, 2023, on her official social media platforms, with shows in various different cities across the United States, Canada, and Europe. It is Rodrigo's second concert tour and first arena tour, following her debuting Sour Tour, which she embarked on throughout 2022 in support of her debut studio album, Sour (2021).

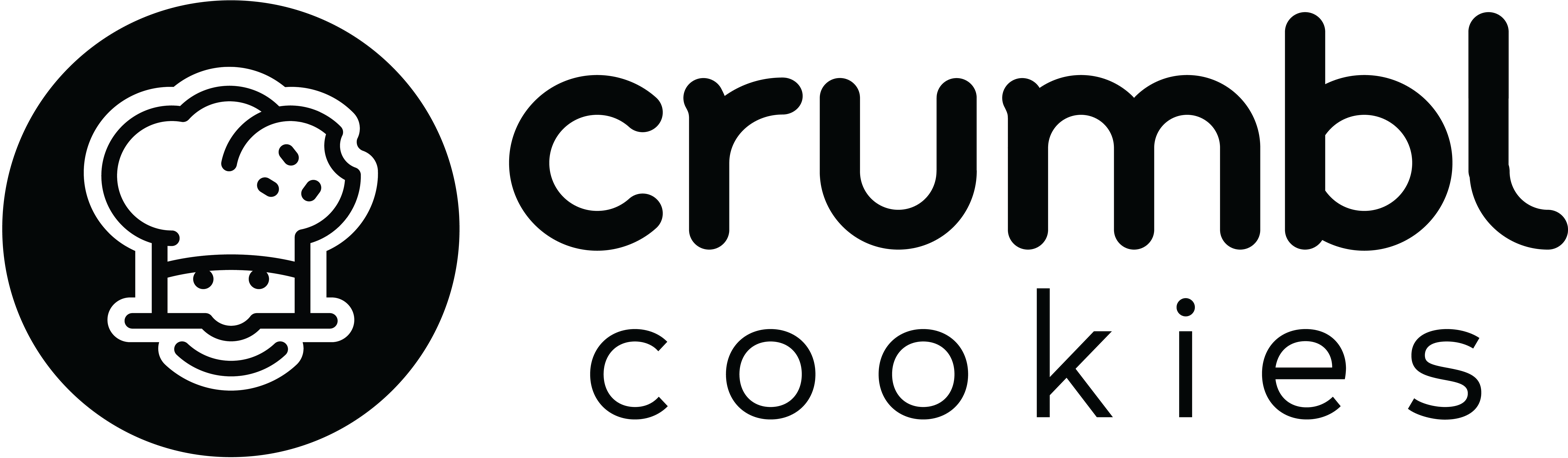
The tour was sponsored by Crumbl Cookies, which sold thematic boxes across North America.

Before its commencement, Rodrigo performed Guts in an exclusive concert at Los Angeles Theatre at Ace Hotel on October 9, 2023, from which all proceeds from ticket sales went to her Fund 4 Good nonprofit organization. The concert was streamed a day later on Rodrigo's official YouTube channel, including stories behind the composition of the album. Moreover, Crumbl Cookies launched a special Guts World Tour themed cookie that would be available in local stores across the US.

Nine new dates were added to the tour on May 8, 2024, with five corresponding to several Asian countries, while the remaining four were distributed between the Australian cities of Melbourne and Sydney, each with two concerts scheduled and New Zealand singer Benee as opening act. On September 10, 2024, a date in Santa Maria, Bulacan, was added to the Asian leg of the tour. Two rescheduled shows at Manchester's Co-op Live were announced on October 10, 2024, after the original dates had to be postponed due to technical issues with the venue. Besides the tour's official run, three dates for Curitiba, Mexico City, and Dublin were revealed on November 12, 2024. The all-stadium shows were billed as Guts World Tour: Spilled, with St. Vincent, Beabadoobee, and Florence Road serving as opening acts.

== Ticket sales ==
Alongside the tour's announcement, it was revealed that there would initially be no public on-sale. Fans could register for a chance to buy tickets until September 17, 2023, at 10 p.m. ET in one of two ways: through Ticketmaster, for access to the sale on September 21; or through American Express's Early Access, for access to the presale on September 20. However, the latter option was limited to American Express Card Members only.

In addition, all cities on the North American leg of the tour offered the "Silver Star Tickets" option, which consisted of a limited number of tickets available for $20 per show, purchasable only in pairs. This program ensured that concertgoers with these tickets would be seated next to each other, aiming to "make it as easy and affordable as possible for her fans to make it out to her shows". All tickets sold for the Santa Maria show were Silver Star Tickets. Ticketmaster deemed the demand "massive", noting that "there are still more fans who registered than tickets available". In response, the company implemented new policies to combat reselling, such as delaying ticket delivery until 72 hours before the concert and making tickets available only electronically.

On September 15, 2023, Rodrigo announced 18 additional dates across North America and Europe due to "overwhelming demand". Four days later, second shows were added in Lisbon and Antwerp due to "incredible demand", as well as a venue upgrade for the Oslo show. On May 15, 2024, two additional shows were announced in both Sydney and Melbourne, while in the following days, second dates were added in Seoul, Bangkok, and Singapore after the first shows sold out during the pre-sale. On June 17, 2024, two additional dates for Inglewood were announced to be held on August 20 and 21 at Intuit Dome, bringing the total to six shows in the city. A couple of days later, a second show in Tokyo was added. Due to high demand, a second date at Mexico City's Estadio GNP Seguros for the Spilled leg was added on November 19.

== Staging and production ==
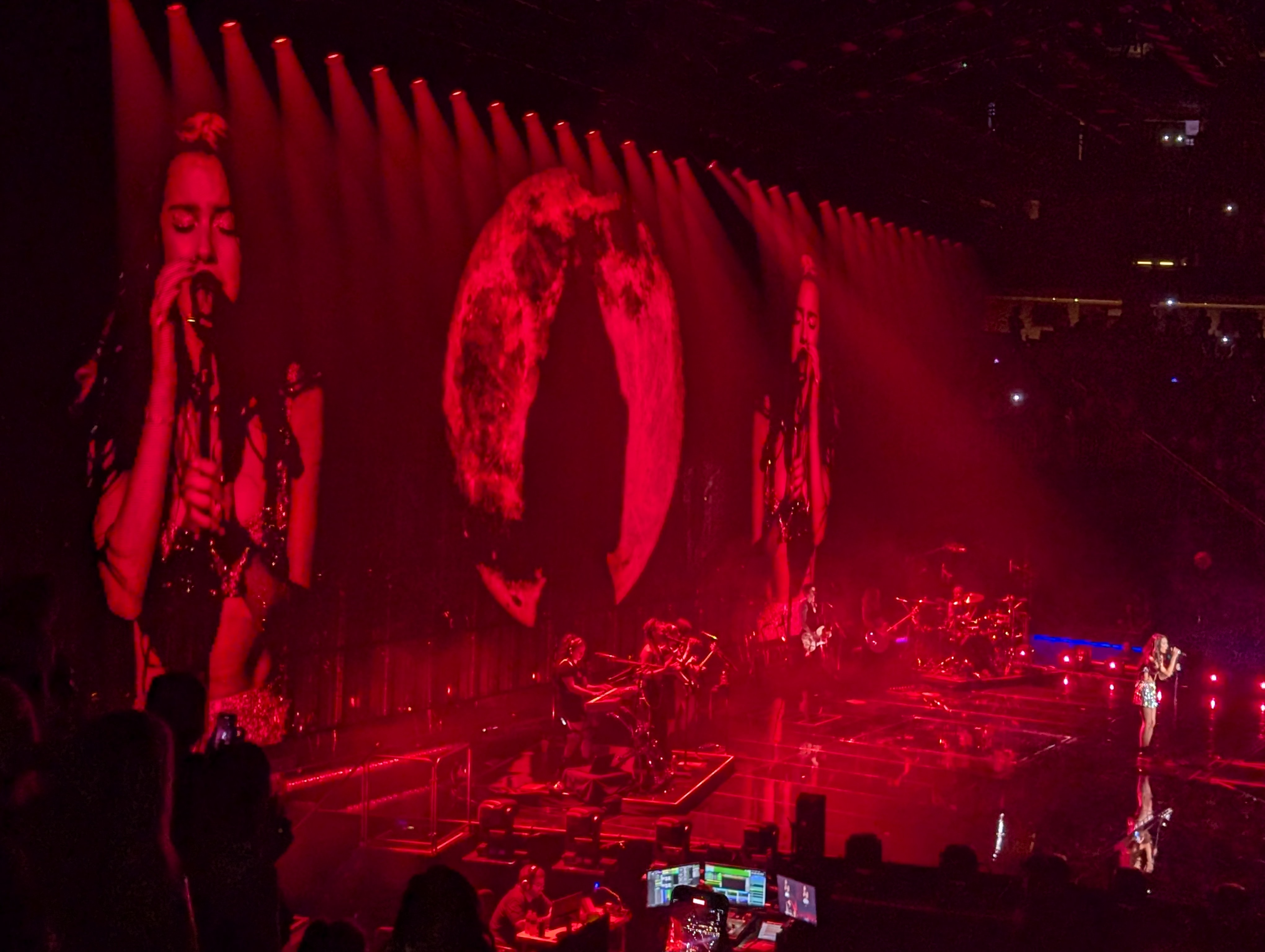
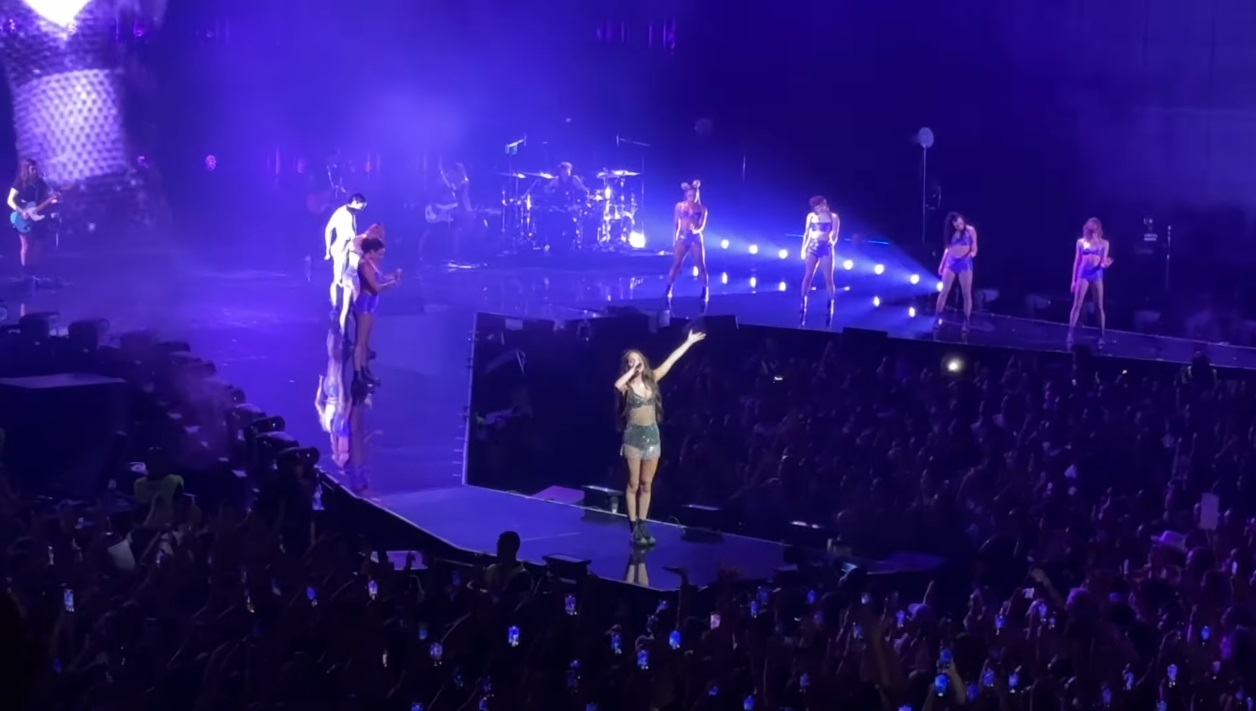
Faraway views of the stage, depicting the screen that was used as a backdrop (left) and the butterfly-shaped catwalks (right)

The stage design for arena shows extended into the crowd at a diagonal on two catwalks for both the left and right end sides, an open section where her music band remains visible throughout the show and a full digital screen element comprising the height and width behind the stage. Though modest, the production also includes elements like multiple camera set ups, a levitating quarter-moon shaped platform and mobile blocks that rise from the center platform. For the outdoor venues, the stage was reduced to a small catwalk and did not feature wardrobe changes nor the levitating platform.

== Concert synopsis ==
=== 2024 concerts ===
Heavily inspired by female rock bands such as the Breeders, Hole, Sleater-Kinney, L7, and Babes in Toyland, the show lasts approximately one hour and thirty minutes and begins with the album title Guts, spelled out with birthday candles, being displayed on the stage's screen. A black and white introductory video depicts Rodrigo running desperately across a somber hotel aisle, in which she eventually arrives to a room and knocks on the door with rings that appear on the cover art of Guts. She and her band then appear on stage to open the show with "Bad Idea Right?", preceding "Ballad of a Homeschooled Girl". Rodrigo then delivers a welcome note to the audience before singing "Vampire", which is followed by "Traitor". Rodrigo proceeds with piano renditions of "Drivers License" and "Teenage Dream" before transitioning to "Pretty Isn't Pretty".

After a wardrobe change, Rodrigo performs "Love Is Embarrassing", accompanied by a choreography routine, introduces her band and dancers, and performs "Making the Bed". Later, she performs "Logical" and "Enough for You" on the half-moon prop flying over the public. After a second costume change, Rodrigo sings "Lacy" in the middle of a retractable circle while dancers perform additional choreography surrounding the structure. Rodrigo then leaves the stage to perform "Jealousy, Jealousy" alongside her fans in the venue barricades. Upon returning to the stage, Rodrigo plays "Happier" and "Favorite Crime" with a band member accompanying on the acoustic guitar. Next, she performs "Deja Vu", before lowering the mood of the concert during "The Grudge".

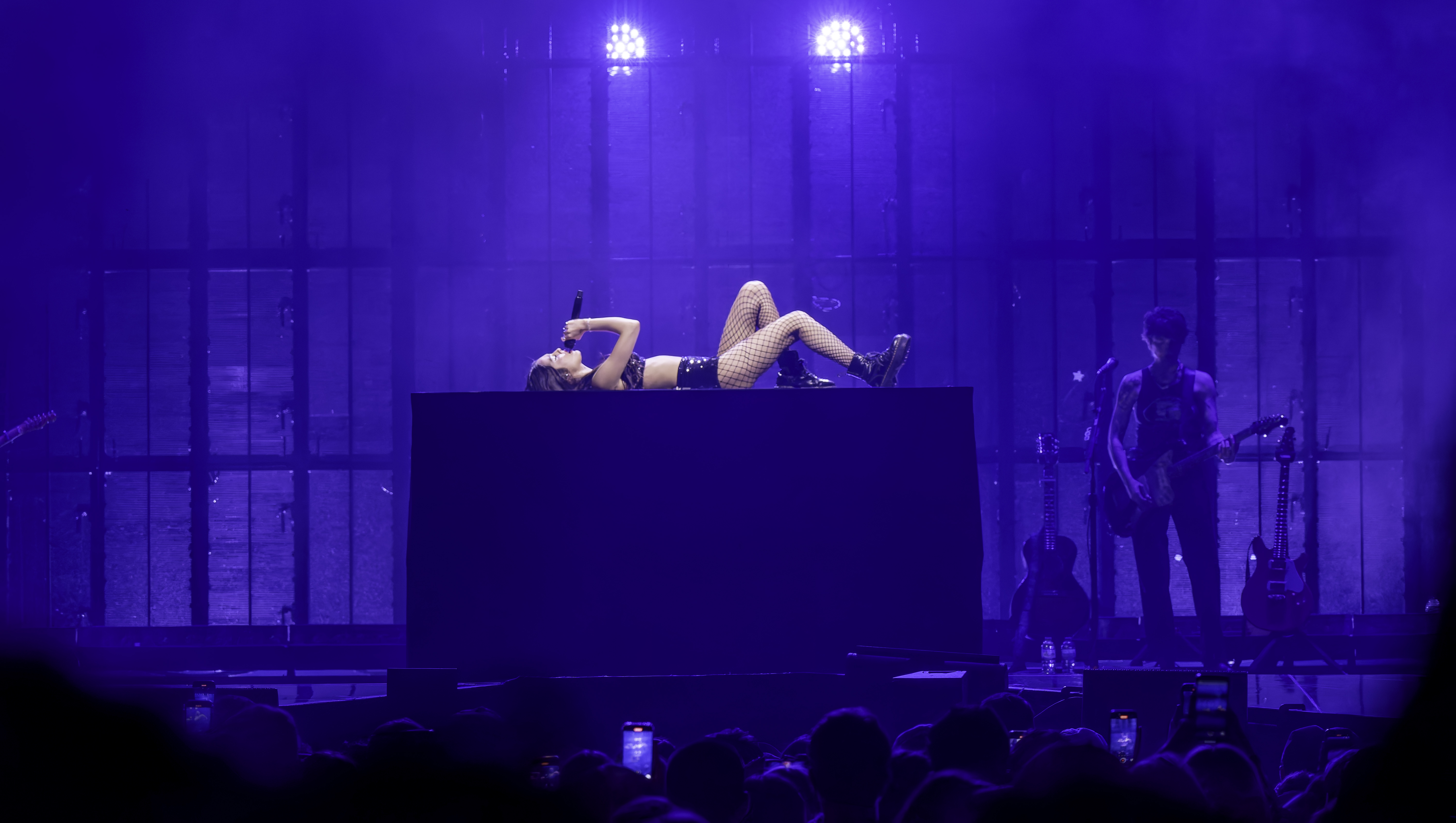
Rodrigo performing "Making the Bed" while lying on a moving block during her concert at the O_{2} Arena in London on May 15, 2024

For "Brutal", Rodrigo reappears after another wardrobe change, in which she follows with a performance of "Obsessed", where she plays the electric guitar herself. She then performs "All-American Bitch"; in the middle of the song, she tells the audience to "think about something or someone that really pisses you off" and "scream your heart out". An encore begins with the performance of "Good 4 U", while Rodrigo uses a red megaphone and wears a specific iron-on T-shirt for each date, including one referencing No Doubt's "Just a Girl". During the concluding song of the show, "Get Him Back!", confetti shoots up from the ceiling and the stage's lighting rigs heavily flash until turning off completely.

=== 2025 concerts ===
The shows during the tour's Spilled leg feature a nearly identical readjusted set list spanning the majority of the Guts album, with the exceptions of "Making the Bed", "Logical", and "The Grudge", while permanently incorporating the deluxe track "So American". The concert begins with a graphic showing Rodrigo slacklining and trying to catch a purple butterfly in front of a black background before falling off the rope, just to appear on stage to start the concert with "Obsessed" played on electric guitar. After performing "Ballad of a Homeschooled Girl" and "Vampire", Rodrigo welcomes the audience and proceeds to sing "Drivers License" and "Traitor" on piano. She then has another brief chat with the public as an introduction to "Bad Idea Right?", which is followed by "Love Is Embarrassing" accompanied by its choreography routine.

"Pretty Isn't Pretty" continues the set list before a full band execution of "Happier". Rodrigo then performs "Lacy" in the middle of the retractable circle while the dancers perform the additional choreography with long fabric ribbons surrounding the structure. After this, she plays "Enough for You" with an electric guitar in the middle of the stage catwalk, where she stays to sing "So American". During a musical intermission, Rodrigo introduces her band members, who abruptly start playing "Jealousy, Jealousy"; she performs the track upon a clear glass block where she writes "I ♡ U" with red lipstick.

A second video interlude depicts Rodrigo floating underwater in the middle of a purple ocean, turning into a lavender fog that leads to "Favorite Crime". Transitioning to "Teenage Dream", the screens display a birthday cake burning by the candles, followed by a "Deja Vu" performance with the dancers ensemble. A third and final video interlude preludes the encore, where Rodrigo lights up a ring of fire around her while guitarists Emily Rosenfield and Daisy Spencer play heavy electric guitar notes on stage. Rodrigo reappears to sing "Brutal", "All-American Bitch", and "Good 4 U". The show ends with Rodrigo performing "Get Him Back!" at the top of a small tower light using the red megaphone as confetti is being shot up from the stage and a bidding farewell from all the crew.

== Critical reception ==
=== North America ===
The show received rave reviews from critics; ABC News classified it as one of the best and biggest of 2024. Tomás Mier of Rolling Stone stated that "Rodrigo cemented her position in pop culture as a generation-defining artist. As a rockstar, and as an energy-filled idol that is only just beginning her career." Niki Kottmann of Desert Sun said that the concert did a good job of showcasing Rodrigo's various talents beyond just singing and songwriting.

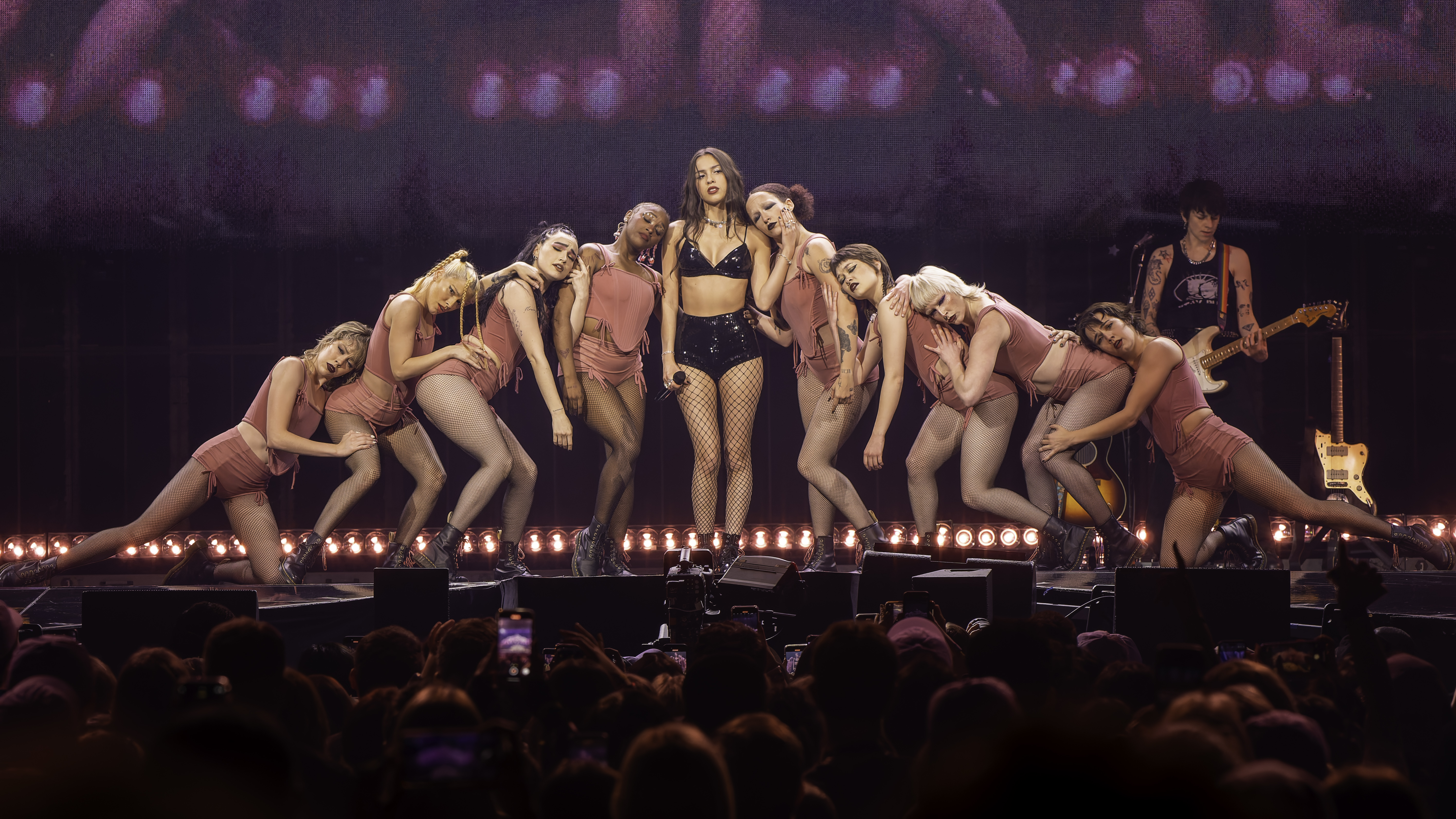
Critics praised Rodrigo's blending of theatrical performances and music.

In The New York Times, Jon Caramanica complimented Rodrigo's performance, which he praised for "the perfection and order of musical theater to the pop-punk and piano ballads her songs alternate with". Eric Fuller of Forbes praised Rodrigo for commanding the stage with "tremendous stage presence, abundant energy and the rare combination of humility in how she recognizes her crowd while belting out power pop rock songs she created". Variety's Chris Willman lauded Rodrigo for being "equally, proficiently gifted in the areas of singing, songcraft, self-revelation and the fine art of rocking out".

For Los Angeles Times, Mikael Wood commended the singer's vocals, stating that "the production never overwhelmed [her] performance, which showcased her strong live vocals", while Philip Cosores of Uproxx wrote that Rodrigo is "establishing herself as an artist that one generation will grow up with, and another can appreciate with a sense of nostalgia and camaraderie". Writing for The Arizona Republic, Ed Masley called Rodrigo a "gifted lyricist whose finest work speaks to the human condition with a winning blend of brutal-out-here honesty and wit", while declaring "if anyone is keeping rock alive in 2024, I'm just glad I got to see her concert".

=== Europe ===
The European leg of the tour received positive reviews from critics. Nicole Glenonn from the Irish Examiner gave the first show in Dublin a five-star review, applauding the all-female band and dancing crew that accompanied Rodrigo on the show, lauding as well the singer's confidence and charisma as "palpable". The Big Issue's Annie McNamee named Rodrigo "the definitive spokesperson for Gen Z girlhood" after the shows held in Glasgow, while writing that "[her] success was built on her understanding of one, fundamental truth; you should never, under any circumstances, underestimate the righteous anger of a teenage girl".

The four-date residency at London's O_{2} Arena was also well received by British media outlets. Thomas Smith from NME and El Hunt from the Evening Standard coincided that Rodrigo "has certainly done bigger and better things" since her debuting tour and that the concerts often felt "like a Greatest Hits show rather than her first arena tour". Mitch Stevens wrote for The Line of Best Fit that Rodrigo "is able to act as the conduit to bring language to the things that can't be communicated without a visceral response". Harvey Marwood concluded his review for Clash with "The set hybridisation between relatable and angry-at-times love music and more emotional tracks ... intertwined for the perfect concert. Olivia Rodrigo, take a bow."

== Commercial performance ==
Billboard and Pitchfork named the Guts World Tour one of the most anticipated tours of 2024. In March 2024, Pollstar reported that the tour grossed a total of $4,233,293 with an attendance of 27,594, from only two shows. According to reports submitted to Pollstar, twelve shows from the first North American leg grossed $17,274,683 and sold 174,431 tickets, while the four shows at New York City's Madison Square Garden grossed a total $7.7 million. The first six European shows grossed a total of $8,584,559 and gathered a total attendance of 80,039, whereas Rodrigo positioned at number eight on the May 2024 reports of Pollstar's Live 75 chart with an average gross of $1,500,592 and attendance of 13,481 per show from five estimated dates.

The tour marked a major milestone as Rodrigo became the youngest female solo artist to gross over $180 million in her debut arena tour. It grossed $184.6 million in total with 1.4 million tickets sold. On May 29, 2025, Billboard revealed that Rodrigo's first ever stadium shows in Mexico made a total revenue $12.1 million with over 114,000 tickets sold.

== Accolades ==
Awards and nominations for Guts World Tour
Organization	Year	Category	Result	Ref.
Nickelodeon Kids' Choice Awards	2024	Favorite Ticket of the Year	Nominated	
Billboard	2024	Billboard's Touring Artist of the Year	Won	
Hollywood Music In Media Awards	2024	Live Concert for Visual Media	Won	
Pollstar Awards	2025	Major Tour of the Year	Nominated	
Pollstar Awards	2025	Pop Tour of the Year	Nominated	
Pollstar Awards	2025	Support/Special Guest of the Year (Note: The nomination recipient is Chappell Roan.)	Won	
iHeartRadio Music Awards	2025	Favorite Tour Style	Nominated	
iHeartRadio Music Awards	2025	Favorite Tour Tradition	Nominated	
iHeartRadio Music Awards	2025	Favorite On Screen	Nominated	
iHeartRadio Music Awards	2025	Favorite Surprise Guest	Nominated	
iHeartRadio Music Awards	2025	Favorite Tour Photographer (Note: The nomination recipient is Miles Leavitt.)	Nominated	

== Philanthropy and activism ==
According to Billboard, Rodrigo donated over US$2 million to several organizations around the world. On the night of the tour's first show in Thousand Palms, Rodrigo spoke about Fund 4 Good and her support for reproductive rights through her Instagram. Rodrigo announced that the fund would directly support community nonprofit organizations that advocate for girls education, support reproductive rights, and prevent gender-based violence. Rodrigo also revealed that part of the proceeds from ticket sales from the tour would go to Fund 4 Good and the National Network of Abortion Funds of North America. On March 6, 2024, it was announced that HeadCount, a nonprofit organization that promotes participation in democracy in the US through music and culture, would have a booth at all shows of the tour in the country and would assist those who wish to register to vote in the US elections.

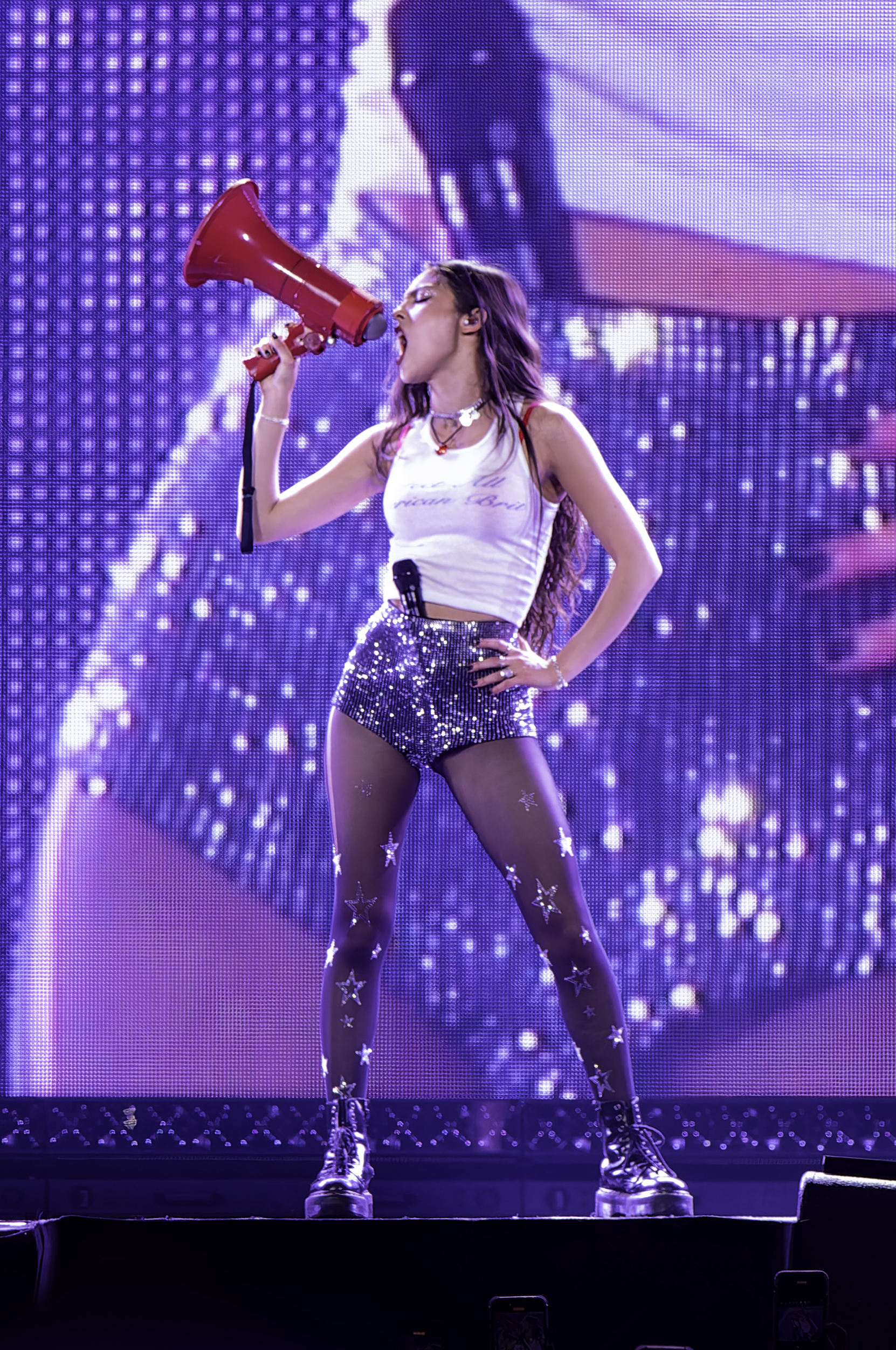
Rodrigo performing "Get Him Back!" with a megaphone while wearing a white tank top that sometimes included feminist phrases

At the March 12, 2024, show in St. Louis, Missouri, where abortion is banned, emergency contraceptives and condoms were distributed. The Missouri Abortion Fund, which provides financial assistance to those who cannot afford the full cost of abortion care, thanked Rodrigo for working with the organization, while joking on social media that "it's brutal out here in Missouri", playing on one of Rodrigo's lyrics. Republican Missouri state senator Bill Eigel posted on X that the singer should be "ashamed" for handing out an "abortifacient". However, morning-after pills do not end but prevent pregnancy. After some criticism, Rodrigo's management team prohibited the abortion funds from distributing contraceptives and supplies at future shows because they would be too accessible to young girls in the audience. Informational materials, hats, buttons, and stickers continued to be distributed.

On March 26, 2024, Rodrigo announced through her Instagram that she would be donating a portion of the proceeds from the tour's Canadian dates to Women's Shelters Canada, which supports women's shelters across the country and helps women and children who are fleeing abuse and violence. One month later, at the start of the European leg in Dublin on April 30, Rodrigo notified that part of the profits would be donated to Women Against Violence Europe, to prevent any type of violence against all women and their children.

During the Asian leg of the tour, Rodrigo made donations to the Pratthanadee Foundation in Thailand, the Korea Foundation for Women, Harmony House Limited in Hong Kong, NPO Women's Saya-Saya in Japan, and Aidha in Singapore. Rodrigo also donated all the ticket sale profits of her October 5 performance in Santa Maria to Jhpiego, a Johns Hopkins University-affiliated nonprofit organization that helps "women and girls, especially in underserved and conflict-affected areas". The concert, which was labeled a "Silver Star Show", sold tickets priced at ₱1,500 (approximately US$25) and was held at the Philippine Arena, which has a capacity of 55,000 as the world's largest indoor arena.

A special performance by Rodrigo at the FireAid benefit concert was announced as part of the tour's Spilled leg. The event took place in Inglewood at Intuit Dome on January 30, 2025, to raise funds for the population affected by the January 2025 Southern California wildfires.

== Concert film ==
Olivia Rodrigo: Guts World Tour
- Release poster
- Directed by: James Merryman
- Produced by: Aleen Keshishian; Michelle An; Tom Colbourne; James Merryman; Zack Morgenroth
- Starring: Olivia Rodrigo; Chappell Roan
- Cinematography: Brett Turnbull
- Edited by: Dom Whitworth
- Music by: Olivia Rodrigo; Chappell Roan
- Production companies: Brown Eyed Girl Productions; Interscope Records
- Distributed by: Netflix
- Release date: October 29, 2024
- Running time: 105 minutes
- Country: United States
- Language: English

On October 2, 2024, Rodrigo sent a newsletter to her fans announcing the Guts World Tour film. The concert was filmed during her two dates at Intuit Dome on August 20 and 21, 2024. The film was released on Netflix on October 29, 2024.

== Set list ==
=== 2024 ===
This set list is from the February 23, 2024, concert in Thousand Palms. It is not representative of all concerts for the duration of the tour.

1. "Bad Idea Right?"
2. "Ballad of a Homeschooled Girl"
3. "Vampire"
4. "Traitor"
5. "Drivers License"
6. "Teenage Dream"
7. "Pretty Isn't Pretty"
8. "Love Is Embarrassing"
9. "Making the Bed"
10. "Logical"
11. "Enough for You"
12. "Lacy"
13. "Jealousy, Jealousy"
14. "Happier"
15. "Favorite Crime"
16. "Deja Vu"
17. "The Grudge"
18. "Brutal"
19. "Obsessed"
20. "All-American Bitch"
  Encore
21. "Good 4 U"
22. "Get Him Back!"

=== 2025 ===
This set list is from the March 26, 2025, concert in Curitiba. It is not representative of all concerts for the duration of the tour.

1. "Obsessed"
2. "Ballad of a Homeschooled Girl"
3. "Vampire"
4. "Drivers License"
5. "Traitor"
6. "Bad Idea Right?"
7. "Love Is Embarrassing"
8. "Pretty Isn't Pretty"
9. "Happier"
10. "Lacy"
11. "Enough for You"
12. "So American"
13. "Jealousy, Jealousy"
14. "Favorite Crime"
15. "Teenage Dream"
16. "Deja Vu"
  Encore
17. "Brutal"
18. "All-American Bitch"
19. "Good 4 U"
20. "Get Him Back!"

=== Alterations ===
- Starting with the show in Miami, "Can't Catch Me Now" was added to the set list after "Jealousy, Jealousy".
- During the show in Nashville, Sheryl Crow joined Rodrigo onstage to perform "If It Makes You Happy".
- During the first show in New York City, Noah Kahan joined Rodrigo onstage to perform "Stick Season".
- During the last show in New York City, Jewel joined Rodrigo onstage to perform "You Were Meant for Me".
- Starting with the first show in Dublin, "So American" was added to the set list after "Lacy".
- Starting with the second show in Dublin, "Can't Catch Me Now" was removed from the set list.
- During the third show in London, Lily Allen joined Rodrigo onstage to perform "Smile".
- During the show in Lexington, Tyler Childers joined Rodrigo onstage to perform "All Your'n".
- During the fifth show in Inglewood, Chappell Roan joined Rodrigo onstage to perform "Hot to Go!". The performance was recorded as part of the concert film.
- Starting with the second show in Melbourne, "All I Want" was added to the set list after "Favorite Crime".
- During the Guts Spilled show in Dublin, Rodrigo performed a cover of "I Love You" by Fontaines D.C.
- During the shows in Manchester, Rodrigo re-added "Lacy", "All I Want", "The Grudge", and "Can't Catch Me Now" to the set list.

== Tour dates ==
List of 2024 concerts, showing date, city, country, venue, opening acts, attendance, and gross revenue
Date (2024)	City	Country	Venue	Opening act	Attendance	Revenue
February 23	Thousand Palms (Note: Labeled as Palm Springs in promotional material.)	United States	Acrisure Arena	Chappell Roan	9,998 / 9,998	$1,733,194
February 24	Phoenix	United States	Footprint Center	Chappell Roan	13,209 / 13,209	$2,351,767
February 27	Houston	United States	Toyota Center	Chappell Roan	13,180 / 13,180	$2,193,430
February 28	Austin	United States	Moody Center	Chappell Roan	12,131 / 12,131	$1,651,162
March 1	Dallas	United States	American Airlines Center	Chappell Roan	14,416 / 14,416	$2,430,009
March 2	New Orleans	United States	Smoothie King Center	Chappell Roan	13,124 / 13,124	$1,925,062
March 5	Orlando	United States	Kia Center	Chappell Roan	13,628 / 13,628	$1,820,488
March 6	Miami	United States	Kaseya Center	Chappell Roan	13,665 / 13,665	$2,253,713
March 8	Charlotte	United States	Spectrum Center	Chappell Roan	14,871 / 14,871	$2,195,950
March 9	Nashville	United States	Bridgestone Arena	Chappell Roan	15,166 / 15,166	$1,989,296
March 12	St. Louis	United States	Enterprise Center	Chappell Roan	13,451 / 13,451	$1,896,567
March 13	Omaha	United States	CHI Health Center	Chappell Roan	14,385 / 14,385	$1,881,526
March 15	Saint Paul	United States	Xcel Energy Center	Chappell Roan	14,871 / 14,871	$2,121,469
March 16	Milwaukee	United States	Fiserv Forum	Chappell Roan	12,160 / 12,160	$1,792,167
March 19	Chicago	United States	United Center	Chappell Roan	29,987 / 29,987	$4,998,707
March 20	Chicago	United States	United Center	Chappell Roan	29,987 / 29,987	$4,998,707
March 22	Columbus	United States	Nationwide Arena	Chappell Roan	14,468 / 14,468	$2,302,842
March 23	Detroit	United States	Little Caesars Arena	Chappell Roan	15,303 / 15,303	$2,240,292
March 26	Montreal	Canada	Bell Centre	Chappell Roan	31,556 / 31,556	$3,829,205
March 27	Montreal	Canada	Bell Centre	Chappell Roan	31,556 / 31,556	$3,829,205
March 29	Toronto	Canada	Scotiabank Arena	Chappell Roan	32,280 / 32,280	$3,859,134
March 30	Toronto	Canada	Scotiabank Arena	Chappell Roan	32,280 / 32,280	$3,859,134
April 1	Boston	United States	TD Garden	Chappell Roan	28,108 / 28,108	$4,789,154
April 2	Boston	United States	TD Garden	Chappell Roan	28,108 / 28,108	$4,789,154
April 5	New York City	United States	Madison Square Garden	The Breeders	57,943 / 57,943	$10,041,757
April 6	New York City	United States	Madison Square Garden	The Breeders	57,943 / 57,943	$10,041,757
April 8	New York City	United States	Madison Square Garden	The Breeders	57,943 / 57,943	$10,041,757
April 9	New York City	United States	Madison Square Garden	The Breeders	57,943 / 57,943	$10,041,757
April 30	Dublin	Ireland	3Arena	Remi Wolf	25,140 / 25,140	$2,312,837
May 1	Dublin	Ireland	3Arena	Remi Wolf	25,140 / 25,140	$2,312,837
May 7	Glasgow	Scotland	OVO Hydro	Remi Wolf	26,981 / 26,981	$3,276,742
May 8	Glasgow	Scotland	OVO Hydro	Remi Wolf	26,981 / 26,981	$3,276,742
May 10	Birmingham	England	Utilita Arena Birmingham	Remi Wolf	27,918 / 27,918	$2,994,980
May 11	Birmingham	England	Utilita Arena Birmingham	Remi Wolf	27,918 / 27,918	$2,994,980
May 14	London	England	The O_{2} Arena	Remi Wolf	75,470 / 75,470	$8,341,563
May 15	London	England	The O_{2} Arena	Remi Wolf	75,470 / 75,470	$8,341,563
May 17	London	England	The O_{2} Arena	Remi Wolf	75,470 / 75,470	$8,341,563
May 18	London	England	The O_{2} Arena	Remi Wolf	75,470 / 75,470	$8,341,563
May 21	Antwerp	Belgium	Sportpaleis	Remi Wolf	42,459 / 42,459	$3,922,061
May 22	Antwerp	Belgium	Sportpaleis	Remi Wolf	42,459 / 42,459	$3,922,061
May 24	Amsterdam	Netherlands	Ziggo Dome	Remi Wolf	31,569 / 31,569	$3,076,121
May 25	Amsterdam	Netherlands	Ziggo Dome	Remi Wolf	31,569 / 31,569	$3,076,121
May 28	Fornebu (Note: Labeled as Oslo in promotional material.)	Norway	Unity Arena (Note: The venue for the show on May 28, 2024, was upgraded from the Oslo Spektrum following high demand.)	Remi Wolf	23,565 / 23,565	$2,318,561
May 30	Copenhagen	Denmark	Royal Arena	Remi Wolf	15,525 / 15,525	$1,709,539
June 1	Berlin	Germany	Uber Arena	Remi Wolf	14,378 / 14,378	$1,515,642
June 4	Hamburg	Germany	Barclays Arena	Remi Wolf	12,120 / 12,120	$1,356,066
June 5	Frankfurt	Germany	Festhalle	Remi Wolf	11,266 / 11,266	$1,223,677
June 7	Munich	Germany	Olympiahalle	Remi Wolf	12,390 / 12,390	$1,383,068
June 9	Casalecchio di Reno (Note: Labeled as Bologna in promotional material.)	Italy	Unipol Arena	Remi Wolf	13,086 / 13,086	$1,331,556
June 11	Zürich	Switzerland	Hallenstadion	Remi Wolf	13,500 / 13,500	$2,022,872
June 12	Cologne	Germany	Lanxess Arena	Remi Wolf	16,595 / 16,595	$1,618,726
June 14	Paris	France	Accor Arena	Remi Wolf	32,901 / 32,901	$2,868,469
June 15	Paris	France	Accor Arena	Remi Wolf	32,901 / 32,901	$2,868,469
June 18	Barcelona	Spain	Palau Sant Jordi	Remi Wolf	17,635 / 17,635	$1,739,374
June 20	Madrid	Spain	WiZink Center	Remi Wolf	15,832 / 15,832	$1,543,275
June 22	Lisbon	Portugal	MEO Arena	Remi Wolf	37,854 / 37,854	$3,341,191
June 23	Lisbon	Portugal	MEO Arena	Remi Wolf	37,854 / 37,854	$3,341,191
July 19	Philadelphia	United States	Wells Fargo Center	PinkPantheress	14,902 / 14,902	$2,438,608
July 20	Washington, D.C.	United States	Capital One Arena	PinkPantheress	14,693 / 14,693	$2,437,106
July 23	Atlanta	United States	State Farm Arena	PinkPantheress	13,829 / 13,829	$1,899,981
July 24	Lexington	United States	Rupp Arena	PinkPantheress	16,200 / 16,200	$2,492,691
July 26	Kansas City	United States	T-Mobile Center	PinkPantheress	13,906 / 13,906	$2,158,193
July 27	Oklahoma City	United States	Paycom Center	—N/a (Note: The scheduled opening act was PinkPantheress; however, due to health reasons, the set was cancelled.)	13,616 / 13,616	$1,844,088
July 30	Denver	United States	Ball Arena	PinkPantheress	13,758 / 13,758	$2,141,197
July 31	Salt Lake City	United States	Delta Center	—N/a (Note: The scheduled opening act was PinkPantheress; however, due to health reasons, she had cancelled all of her remaining dates as an opener.)	13,162 / 13,162	$1,895,622
August 2	San Francisco	United States	Chase Center	—N/a	27,939 / 27,939	$4,557,754
August 3	San Francisco	United States	Chase Center	—N/a	27,939 / 27,939	$4,557,754
August 6	Seattle	United States	Climate Pledge Arena	—N/a	30,654 / 30,654	$5,357,638
August 7	Seattle	United States	Climate Pledge Arena	—N/a	30,654 / 30,654	$5,357,638
August 9	Vancouver	Canada	Rogers Arena	—N/a	15,661 / 15,661	$1,880,670
August 10	Portland	United States	Moda Center	—N/a	14,387 / 14,387	$1,993,924
August 13	Inglewood (Note: Labeled as Los Angeles in promotional material.)	United States	Kia Forum	The Breeders	58,669 / 58,669	$9,828,163
August 14	Inglewood	United States	Kia Forum	The Breeders	58,669 / 58,669	$9,828,163
August 16	Inglewood	United States	Kia Forum	The Breeders	58,669 / 58,669	$9,828,163
August 17	Inglewood	United States	Kia Forum	The Breeders	58,669 / 58,669	$9,828,163
August 20	Inglewood	United States	Intuit Dome	The Breeders	31,181 / 31,181	$5,717,015
August 21	Inglewood	United States	Intuit Dome	The Breeders	31,181 / 31,181	$5,717,015
September 15	Pak Kret (Note: Labeled as Bangkok in promotional material.)	Thailand	Impact Arena	—N/a	25,797 / 25,797	$3,711,573
September 16	Pak Kret	Thailand	Impact Arena	—N/a	25,797 / 25,797	$3,711,573
September 20	Seoul	South Korea	Jamsil Arena	—N/a	23,851 / 23,851	$2,740,513
September 21	Seoul	South Korea	Jamsil Arena	—N/a	23,851 / 23,851	$2,740,513
September 24	Hong Kong		AsiaWorld–Arena	—N/a	11,831 / 11,831	$1,821,586
September 27	Tokyo	Japan	Ariake Arena	—N/a	24,555 / 24,555	$2,479,943
September 28	Tokyo	Japan	Ariake Arena	—N/a	24,555 / 24,555	$2,479,943
October 1	Singapore		Singapore Indoor Stadium	—N/a	20,263 / 20,263	$2,598,801
October 2	Singapore		Singapore Indoor Stadium	—N/a	20,263 / 20,263	$2,598,801
October 5	Santa Maria (Note: Labeled as Manila in promotional material.)	Philippines	Philippine Arena	—N/a	48,829 / 48,829	$1,222,691
October 9	Melbourne	Australia	Rod Laver Arena	Benee	57,130 / 57,130	$6,809,897
October 10	Melbourne	Australia	Rod Laver Arena	Benee	57,130 / 57,130	$6,809,897
October 13	Melbourne	Australia	Rod Laver Arena	Benee	57,130 / 57,130	$6,809,897
October 14	Melbourne	Australia	Rod Laver Arena	Benee	57,130 / 57,130	$6,809,897
October 17	Sydney	Australia	Qudos Bank Arena	Benee	64,096 / 64,096	$7,197,262
October 18	Sydney	Australia	Qudos Bank Arena	Benee	64,096 / 64,096	$7,197,262
October 21	Sydney	Australia	Qudos Bank Arena	Benee	64,096 / 64,096	$7,197,262
October 22	Sydney	Australia	Qudos Bank Arena	Benee	64,096 / 64,096	$7,197,262

List of 2025 concerts, showing date, city, country, venue, opening acts, attendance, and gross revenue
Date (2025)	City	Country	Venue	Opening act	Attendance	Revenue
January 30 (Note: The concert on January 30, 2025, at Intuit Dome in Inglewood was part of FireAid, and was additionally billed as Guts World Tour: Spilled.)	Inglewood	United States	Intuit Dome	—N/a		
March 26 (Note: Billed as Guts World Tour: Spilled.)	Curitiba	Brazil	Estádio Couto Pereira	St. Vincent	36,198 / 36,198	$3,881,676
April 2	Mexico City	Mexico	Estadio GNP Seguros	St. Vincent	114,168 / 114,168	$12,116,268
April 3	Mexico City	Mexico	Estadio GNP Seguros	St. Vincent	114,168 / 114,168	$12,116,268
June 24	Dublin	Ireland	Marlay Park	Beabadoobee; Florence Road	40,000 / 40,000	$4,517,599
June 30 (Note: The concerts on June 30 and July 1, 2025, at Co-Op Live in Manchester were originally scheduled to take place on May 3 and 4, 2024, but were rescheduled due to technical issues with the venue.)	Manchester	England	Co-op Live	—N/a	35,108 / 35,108	$4,137,917
July 1	Manchester	England	Co-op Live	—N/a	35,108 / 35,108	$4,137,917
Total					1,657,377 / 1,657,377 (100%)	$208,648,942

== Personnel ==
Adapted from the credits of Guts World Tour concert film

Musicians

- Hayley Brownell – drums (2024)
- India Carney – backing vocals
- Anilee List – backing vocals
- Camila Mora – keyboards, backing vocals
- Moa Munoz – bass, backing vocals
- Jordi Radnoti – drums (2025)
- Olivia Rodrigo – lead vocals, piano, acoustic and rhythm guitar
- Emily Rosenfield – lead guitar, backing vocals
- Daisy Spencer – rhythm and acoustic guitar, backing vocals

Dancers

- Devan Aischa
- Julia Alaimo
- Kyra Cole
- Myranda Gibson
- Maya-Daeja Holley
- Forest Lee
- Iyana Monet
- Paris Simpson
- Alex White

Additional personnel

- Jorge Alejandrro – editor
- Michelle An – creative consultant
- Amanda Balen – assistant choreographer
- Joe Bay – lighting programmer
- Steve Berman – executive producer
- Bret Chin-Quon – road manager
- Tom Colbourne – producer
- Elizabeth Cook – line producer
- Jason Danter – production manager
- Magalie Desrochers – line producer
- Christiana Divona – creative consultant
- Candice Dragonas – executive producer
- Molly Fischer – day to day
- Peter Forster – lighting director
- Craig Frank – assistant musical director
- Aude Guivarc'h – content director
- Hard Feelings – video content, tour visuals
- Clayton Hawkins – hairdresser
- Chloe Heller – assistant costume designer
- Marty Hom – tour manager
- John Janick – executive producer
- Daniel Jean – executive producer
- Stacy Jones – musical director
- Aleen Keshishian – management
- Sienna Lyons – assistant choreographer
- Tommy Maneykowski – drum technician
- Karissa Marie – make-up artist
- James B. Merryman – camera director
- Tarik Mikou – show director, creative director
- Alina Moffat – music clearances
- Zack Morgenroth – management
- Carl Ryan – talent relations (Interscope)
- Moath Hattab – A&R (Interscope), creative director
- Valerie Morehouse – vocal coach
- Luis Munoz – guitar technician
- Melissa Myrtle – choreographer
- Moment Factory – creative director, production designer
- Dan Norman – lighting designer, production designer
- Tiffany Olsen – associate creative director
- Marie-Eve Pageau – project manager, spatial designer
- Heather Picchiottino – costume designer
- Maurizio Pino – guitar and keyboard technician
- James Richardson – production manager
- Alexandra Rollier – content producer
- James Thompson – management
- Jean-Baptiste Verguin – spatial designer
- Sveta Yermolayeva – content producer
- Polina Zakharova – content director, concept research

== See also ==
- List of awards and nominations received by Olivia Rodrigo
- List of highest-grossing concert tours by women
- List of Olivia Rodrigo live performances
