= Get Him Back! =

Single by Olivia Rodrigo

from the album Guts
- Released: September 15, 2023
- Studio: Amusement (Los Angeles)
- Genre: Rap rock; pop rap; pop-punk; pop rock
- Length: 3:31
- Label: Geffen; EMI
- Songwriters: Olivia Rodrigo; Dan Nigro
- Producer: Dan Nigro

Olivia Rodrigo singles chronology
"Bad Idea Right?" (2023)	"Get Him Back!" (2023)	"Can't Catch Me Now" (2023)

Music video
- "Get Him Back!" on YouTube

"Get Him Back!" (stylized in all lowercase) is a song by American singer-songwriter Olivia Rodrigo from her second studio album, Guts (2023). Rodrigo wrote the song with its producer, Dan Nigro. EMI Records released it as the album's third single on September 15, 2023. A rap rock, pop rap, pop-punk, and pop rock song, "Get Him Back!" explores Rodrigo's desire to exact revenge on her ex-partner while simultaneously wanting to reconcile with him; the titular phrase conveys this through its double meaning.

Music critics described "Get Him Back!" as a highlight on Guts, praised the humorous lyricism and chorus, and also commented on Rodrigo's rapping. It was included on several year-end lists of the best songs of 2023. The track reached the top 10 in Australia, Ireland, New Zealand, and the United Kingdom as well as the top 20 in Canada, Greece, Norway, Singapore, and the United States. It received double platinum certifications in Australia and Canada and platinum certifications in Brazil and New Zealand.

Jack Begert directed the music video for "Get Him Back!" entirely on an iPhone 15 Pro Max. It depicts clones of Rodrigo as they destroy her ex-partner's house, throwing around knives and household objects. She performed the song on The Today Show and at the 2023 MTV Video Music Awards; the latter was positively received. Rodrigo included it as the last song on the set list of her 2024–2025 concert tour, the Guts World Tour, as part of an encore.

== Background and release ==
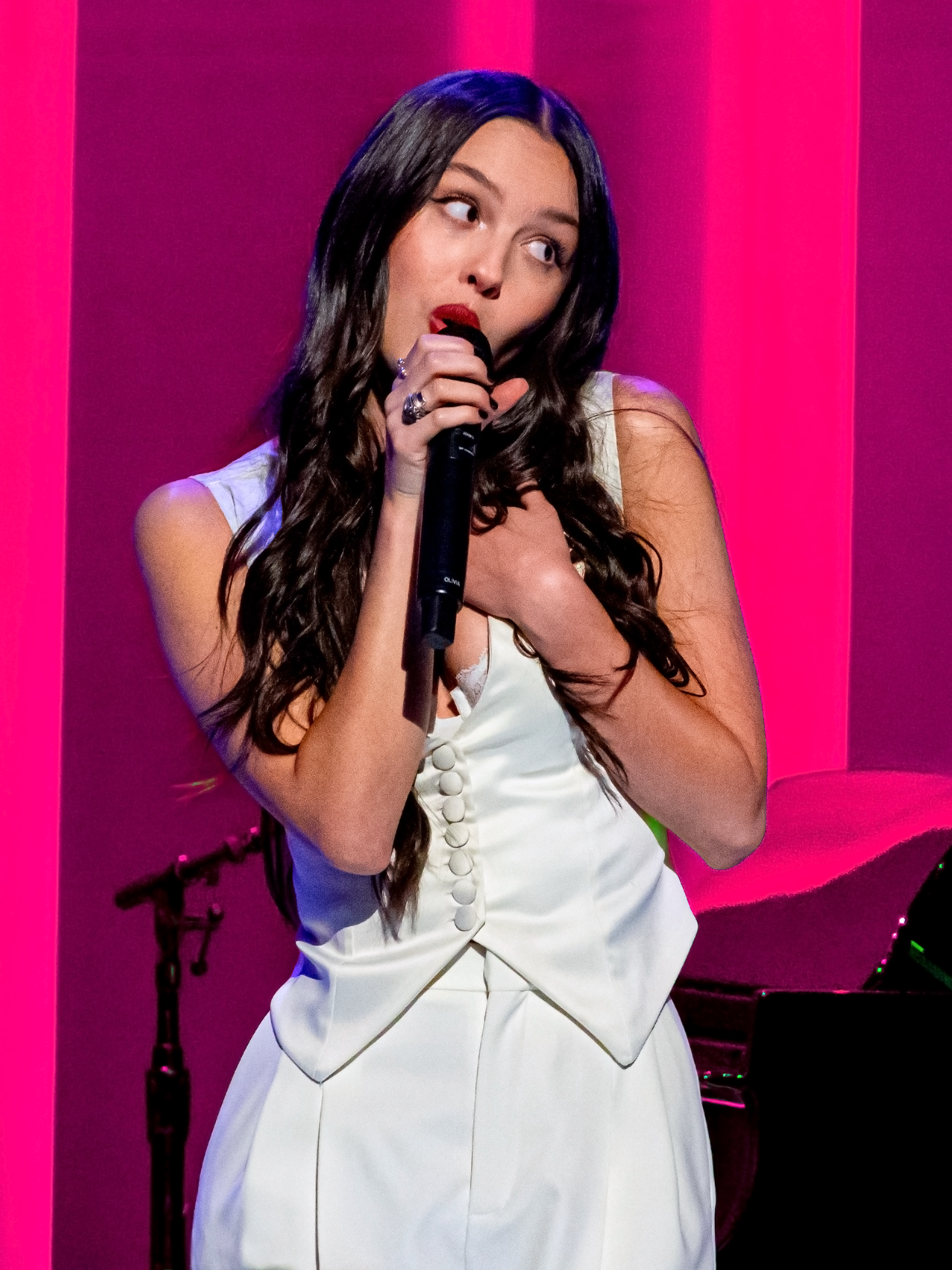
"Get Him Back!" was inspired by questionable decisions made by Olivia Rodrigo (pictured in 2023) due to people's expectations.

Olivia Rodrigo's debut studio album, Sour, was released in May 2021, following which she took a break from songwriting for six months. She conceived the follow-up album, Guts (2023), at the age of 19, while experiencing "lots of confusion, mistakes, awkwardness & good old fashioned teen angst". Sour's producer, Dan Nigro, returned to produce every track on it. They wrote over 100 songs and included the more rock-oriented tracks on the album because they drew a bigger reaction from her audiences during live shows.

In a studio session for Guts at the Electric Lady Studios, Nigro wanted to create a track using just two chords after his father said that the best songs generally possessed three chords. Rodrigo and Nigro wrote a song she was dissatisfied with, which made her doubt her songwriting abilities. After taking a brief recess, they ended up creating "Get Him Back!". The song was inspired by the compulsion Rodrigo felt to conform to people's expectations, which led her to make questionable decisions and date people she should not have. Though they used more than two chords in it, Nigro believed that "we failed [...] But we ended up writing something that we really liked with three chords." Rodrigo stated that "Get Him Back!" was very enjoyable to write and became one of her favorite songs. She felt its chorus was catchy and suitable for a crowd to sing along to.

Rodrigo announced the album title on June 26, 2023, and its lead single, "Vampire", was released four days later. On August 1, 2023, she revealed Guts' tracklist, which featured "Get Him Back!" as the eighth track. A teaser clip released alongside the tracklist included letters addressed to "258 get him back drive". The song became available for digital download on the album, which was released on September 8, 2023. EMI Records sent it for radio airplay in Italy seven days later, and Geffen Records promoted it to contemporary hit radio stations in the United States. "Get Him Back!" was featured in the first trailer for the 2024 film adaptation of the 2017 musical Mean Girls, prompting criticism from reviewers who believed original music would have been better suited. The song was also included in the video game Fortnite Festival.

== Music and production ==
"Get Him Back!"
"Get Him Back!" is a rap rock, pop rap, and pop-punk song. Rodrigo initially uses the sprechgesang technique and then shouts in the pop rock-influenced chorus.

"Get Him Back!" is 3 minutes and 31 seconds long. Nigro produced the song and provided vocal production, and he handled engineering with its co-producers, Alexander 23 and Ian Kirkpatrick. He played acoustic guitar, electric guitar, percussion, piano, bass, synthesizer, and programmed drums; Alexander 23 played drums, slide guitar, bass, and synthesizer; Kirkpatrick played synthesizer and programmed drums; and Sterling Laws played drums. Mitch McCarthy mixed the song at Amusement Studios in Los Angeles, where it was also recorded, and Randy Merrill mastered it.

"Get Him Back!" is a rap rock, pop rap, pop-punk, and pop rock song, the latter being most present in the chorus. It has been likened to 1990s and 2000s rock music. The song has a "quiet-loud dynamic" according to Pitchfork's Arielle Gordon, as Rodrigo raps the verses in a swaddled tone but chants the choruses in an energetic way. She uses the sprechgesang technique, which was compared to the music of Wet Leg by Alexis Petridis of The Guardian. "Get Him Back!" has a three-chord melody and a heavy and offbeat rhythm. In the song's whispered bridge, Rodrigo sniggers with chanted vocals and jagged guitars in the backdrop, representing an increase in her rage; this "sends the frenetic peak of the song's last chorus into orbit" in Gordon's view.

The synchronized shouted vocals in the chorus recall Taylor Swift's 2012 single "We Are Never Ever Getting Back Together" according to some critics, while the melody received comparisons to Len's 1999 single "Steal My Sunshine". Stereogum's Chris DeVille described the song as "half 'So What'cha Want' and half 'Steal My Sunshine'". Lisa Wright of DIY likened the melody to Charli XCX's 2014 album Sucker, and Puja Patel of Pitchfork compared its "stadium stomp" quality to the song "Boom Clap" (2014) from the album. Patel believed "Get Him Back!" contained elements from several songs and musicians—Bleachers' "I Wanna Get Better" (2014), "We Are Never Ever Getting Back Together", Sleigh Bells, Kreayshawn's song "Gucci Gucci" (2011), and the Beastie Boys. Critics also compared it to songs like Beck's "Loser" (1993), Butthole Surfers' "Pepper" (1996), Sum 41's "Fat Lip" (2001), Weezer's "Beverly Hills" (2005), and the music of Avril Lavigne.

== Lyrical interpretation ==
The lyrics of "Get Him Back!" explore Rodrigo's desire to exact revenge towards her ex-partner while simultaneously wanting to reconcile with him; the titular phrase conveys this through its double meaning. The song's verses consist of personal details about the relationship. In the first one, she declares it commenced during summertime and concluded by spring. Rodrigo derides the ex-partner, describing him as egotistical and short-tempered, and she claims he lied about being six feet and two inches tall. She recalls both the positive and negative experiences they had together: calling him "so much fun" and reminiscing about parties and trips to France, while also noting his habit of making sexual advances toward her friends.

In the chorus, Rodrigo repeats the titular lyric: "I wanna get him back", articulating her desire to make him envious and being unhappy because she misses him in the alternate lines. She confesses to writing letters for him and not sending them, and missing his kisses and humor, in the second verse. (Note: The lyric "Cause I miss the way he kisses and the way he made me laugh" was originally intended to be "Cause I miss the way he kisses and the way he grabbed my ass" before Rodrigo changed it.) Rodrigo also states that she writes text messages but refrains from sending them because it would disappoint her friends, which The New York Times' Jon Caramanica believed symbolized that her relationships with her friends were "the real casualties" documented in the song. Despite the ex-partner's shortcomings, she believes that "I am my father's daughter, so maybe I can fix him?", a reference to her father being a therapist. In the bridge, Rodrigo sings about her conflicting thoughts, wanting to damage his car, hurt him emotionally, and then heal the pain she caused all at the same time. In its final line, Rodrigo states she wants to meet his mother to say that "her son sucks", which Caramanica thought might be a double entendre. Lindsay Zoladz of The New York Times believed the self-contradictory "do-I-love-them-or-wish-they-were-dead" theme of "Get Him Back!" recalled early 2000s emo music of bands like Saves the Day, Taking Back Sunday, and Nigro's own As Tall As Lions.

== Critical reception ==
"Get Him Back!" received positive reviews from music critics, who described it as a highlight on Guts and one of the most potential commercial hits. Variety's Chris Willman thought the song was among the most charismatic ones on the album, and Billboard's Jason Lipshutz considered it the best track and an "older-sister version" of "Drivers License" (2021). Charles Lyons-Burt of Slant Magazine believed its conflicted essence unveils a new attitude or emotion with every play.

Some critics believed the lyricism of "Get Him Back!" was clever and exemplified Rodrigo's growth as a songwriter. Wright said the song displayed "winking lyrical smarts". Gordon and Lyons-Burt thought its messiness mirrored breakups in most relationships, and the latter believed it encapsulated the progression of her formula. Reviewers described "Get Him Back!" as one of Rodrigo's funnier songs, and some called the lyricism age-suitably immature, scathing, and "squishy". GQ's Jessie Atkinson included the line about her wanting to meet the ex-partner's mother in her list of the album's standout and "gutsiest" lyrics, and Nylon's Steffanee Wang included it alongside the reference to Rodrigo's father in her list of Guts' impeccable lyrics. Celia Almeida of Miami New Times named the latter among Rodrigo's most "scathing" lyrics.

Critics like DeVille and the Los Angeles Times' Mikael Wood believed Rodrigo's rap flow was well synchronized with the beat of "Get Him Back!". On the other hand, John Murphy of MusicOMH thought it "falls a bit flat". Writing for The Independent, Helen Brown believed she matched the "rhythmic spirit" of Debbie Harry in "One Way or Another" (1979) on it. According to Gordon, Rodrigo's vocal cadence embodied a "school bully" during the verses and a cheerleader during the choruses, while Wood said "Get Him Back!" benefited from her background as an actress, displaying "pitch-perfect line readings that shift between comic registers on a dime — from naturalistic to screwball, faux-earnest to deadpan".

The chorus of "Get Him Back!" was also the subject of praise; critics described it as massive, glorious, rousing, and brain-devouring. Pitchfork's Cat Zhang believed the chorus deserved to be screamed in every location, and Paste's Rachel Saywitz thought it "drives the point home". "Get Him Back!" was included on critical lists of the best songs of 2023 at number four by DeVille, number five by Pitchfork, number seven by Rolling Stone, number nine by Billboard, number 41 by Slant Magazine, and unranked by Billboard Philippines and USA Today. Rolling Stone's Rob Sheffield ranked it as Rodrigo's third-best song in September 2023; he compared the line about her wanting to meet the ex-partner's mother to the lyricism of Joni Mitchell and picked his favorite lyric: "I wanna key his car, I wanna make him lunch."

== Commercial performance ==
"Get Him Back!" debuted and peaked just outside of the US Billboard Hot 100 and the Canadian Hot 100's top ten, both at number 11 for the charts dated September 23, 2023. The song was certified double platinum by Music Canada. It entered the UK Singles Chart at number seven and became Rodrigo's seventh top-10 single. "Get Him Back!" received a platinum certification in the United Kingdom from the British Phonographic Industry, and the Official Charts Company declared it her 14th-biggest song in the country in February 2024.

In Australia, "Get Him Back!" debuted at number six and became Rodrigo's seventh top-10 single. The song was certified double platinum by the Australian Recording Industry Association for selling 140,000 equivalent units. It entered at number five in New Zealand and became her ninth top-10 song. "Get Him Back!" received a platinum certification from Recorded Music NZ. The song charted at number seven on the Billboard Global 200. It also reached the top 40 at number 5 in Ireland, number 13 in Singapore, number 18 in Greece, number 19 in Norway, number 28 in Sweden, number 31 in Portugal, and number 37 in the Netherlands. "Get Him Back!" received a platinum certification in Brazil and gold in Mexico.

== Music video ==
A still from the "Get Him Back!" music video, in which Rodrigo sings while sitting on the bed while one of her clones kisses the mirror and another throws a lamp

Jack Begert directed the music video for "Get Him Back!" entirely on an iPhone 15 Pro Max in Los Angeles. This followed Rodrigo's 2021 "Brutal" music video, which was filmed on an iPad. Xiao Liu, the photography director, achieved the former video's quick shots using crash zoom on the device's 5x Telephoto camera. It was released on September 12, 2023, a few hours after Apple Inc. announced the iPhone 15 Pro Max.

In the video, eight identical versions of Rodrigo join to destroy her ex-partner's house. While one of them bakes cupcakes, the others throw around knives and household objects. Rodrigo then walks a traffic jammed street, where the clones smash car windows and sing along. DIY's Daisy Carter believed the inclusion of the clones encapsulated the "dual mentality" expressed by the song's titular phrase, and Consequence's Abby Jones thought they were "each representing one of the contradicting voices in Rodrigo's head telling her to key [her ex's] car". Savannah Salazar of Vulture believed the video upstaged the device to become the most enthralling thing unveiled on its release day. It was nominated for Best Visual Effects at the 2024 MTV Video Music Awards.

== Live performances ==
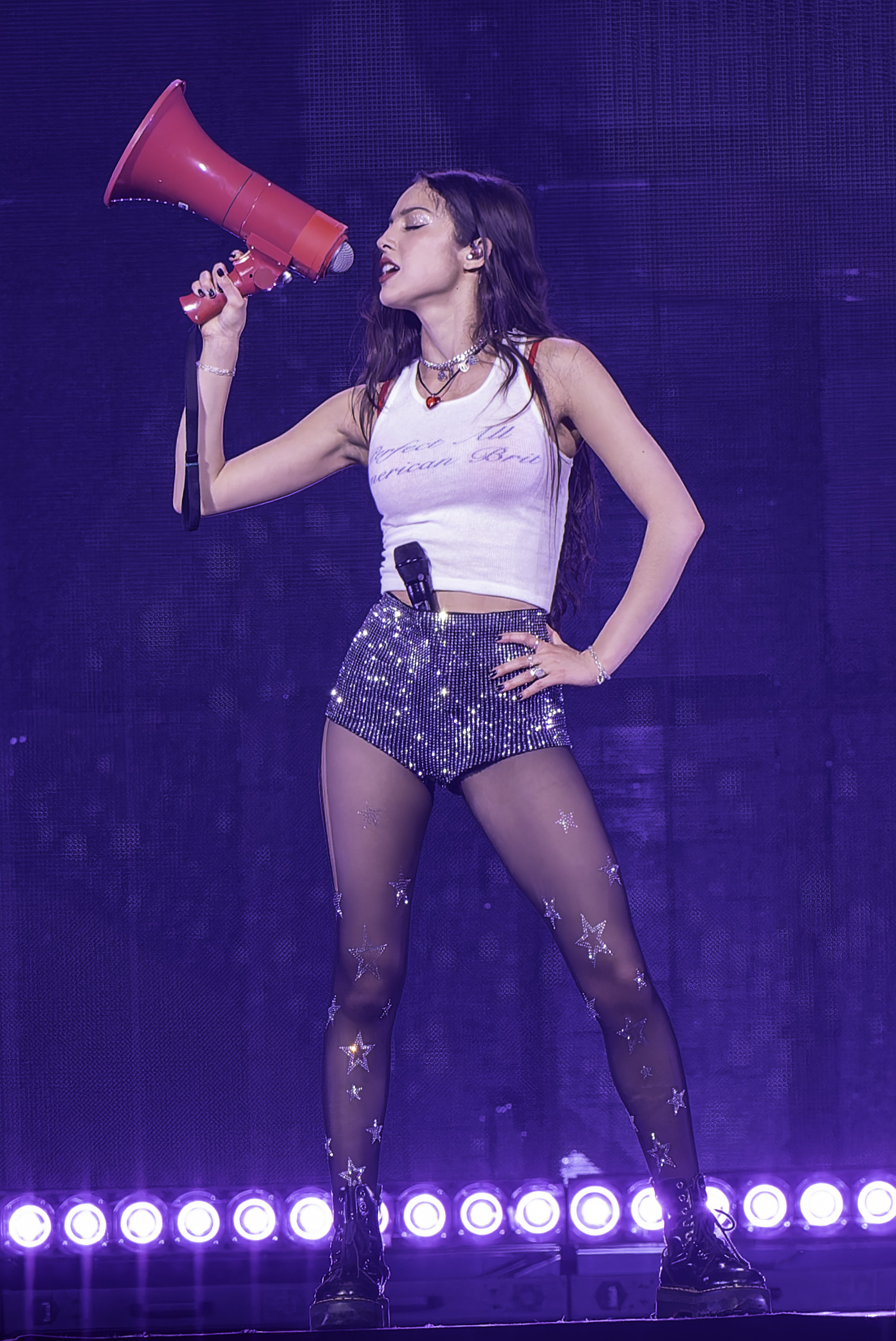
Rodrigo performing "Get Him Back!" on the Guts World Tour in May 2024

Rodrigo performed "Get Him Back!" live for the first time on The Today Show on September 8, 2023. Four days later, she gave a performance of "Vampire" and "Get Him Back!" at the 2023 MTV Video Music Awards, the creative direction of which was inspired by the songs' music videos. Rodrigo began by singing the former in white knee-high leg warmers along with a red sports bra and skirt. After the forest set was destroyed by fireworks, she was rushed off the stage by a staffer as a glitched version of her single "Good 4 U" (2021) played. The camera focused on Selena Gomez and the crowd, who appeared concerned, not realizing it was a recreation of the "Vampire" music video. Rodrigo returned to perform "Get Him Back!" in front of a curtain, accompanied by brunette dancers in identical pink outfits who referenced the clones in the music video. The performance was positively received by critics like Parade's Devon Forward, who thought Rodrigo gave it her all, and Rolling Stone's Angie Martoccio and Tomás Mier, who believed it heralded "Get Him Back!"'s real arrival to the stage despite being preceded by the Today Show performance. Stephen Daw of Billboard called it memorable, and The New York Times declared it the most unforgettable fake-out in their list of five memorable moments from the show.

Rodrigo reprised "Get Him Back!" with background singers at BBC Radio 1's Live Lounge on October 2, 2023. She sang the song at the Ace Hotel Los Angeles seven days later, in a concert exclusively for American Express cardholders. On December 1, 2023, Rodrigo reprised it at the KIIS-FM Jingle Ball. On December 18, she uploaded a Vevo Live performance of "Get Him Back!", in which she performed with a band in a faintly lit gritty basement amid grungy posters and exposed pipes. American Songwriter's Clayton Edwards believed the aesthetic choices did not upstage Rodrigo's contagious energy.

The song is included as the last one on the set list of Rodrigo's 2024–2025 concert tour, the Guts World Tour, as part of an encore. It is part of a set of rock-oriented songs, alongside "Brutal", "Obsessed" (2024), "All-American Bitch" (2023), and "Good 4 U", which together recalls 1990s rock artists like Alanis Morissette and Gwen Stefani according to Chicago Sun-Times' Selena Fragassi. During the performance, she sings the first verse through a megaphone, clad in glittering shorts and a midriff-baring top which bears phrases such as "and just like that", "Carrie Bradshaw AF", or "Never Se(a)ttle". Rodrigo later walks into the crowd as star-shaped confetti falls down. The Tennessean's Audrey Gibbs believed she belted, stomped, and leapt with intense energy during the encore, which she included in her standout moments of the show. Rodrigo closed her Lollapalooza Chile set with "Get Him Back!" in March 2025.

== Credits and personnel ==
Credits are adapted from the liner notes of Guts.

- Dan Nigro – producer, songwriter, engineer, acoustic guitar, electric guitar, percussion, piano, vocal producer, bass, synthesizer, drum programming, background vocals
- Olivia Rodrigo – vocals, background vocals, songwriter
- Alexander 23 – co-producer, drums, engineer, slide guitar, bass, synthesizer, background vocals
- Ian Kirkpatrick – co-producer, engineer, synthesizer, drum programming
- Sterling Laws – drums
- Chappell Roan – ad-libs
- Randy Merrill – mastering
- Mitch McCarthy – mixing

== Charts ==
=== Weekly charts ===
Weekly chart performance
Chart (2023–2024)	Peak position
Australia (ARIA)	6
Austria (Ö3 Austria Top 40)	52
Canada Hot 100 (Billboard)	11
Canada CHR/Top 40 (Billboard)	12
Canada Hot AC (Billboard)	25
Czech Republic Singles Digital (ČNS IFPI)	63
France (SNEP)	188
Germany (GfK)	78
Global 200 (Billboard)	7
Greece (IFPI)	18
Ireland (IRMA)	5
Italy Airplay (EarOne)	55
Japan Hot Overseas (Billboard Japan)	15
Lithuania (AGATA)	70
Netherlands (Dutch Top 40)	37
Netherlands (Single Top 100)	48
New Zealand (Recorded Music NZ)	5
Norway (VG-lista)	19
Poland (Polish Streaming Top 100)	80
Portugal (AFP)	31
Singapore (RIAS)	13
Slovakia Airplay (ČNS IFPI)	50
Slovakia Singles Digital (ČNS IFPI)	75
Spain (Promusicae)	79
Sweden (Sverigetopplistan)	28
Switzerland (Schweizer Hitparade)	86
UK Singles (Official Charts)	7
US Billboard Hot 100	11
US Adult Contemporary (Billboard)	28
US Adult Pop Airplay (Billboard)	10
US Hot Rock & Alternative Songs (Billboard)	3
US Pop Airplay (Billboard)	8

=== Year-end charts ===
2023 year-end chart performance
Chart (2023)	Position
US Hot Rock & Alternative Songs (Billboard)	32

2024 year-end chart performance
Chart (2024)	Position
US Adult Top 40 (Billboard)	38
US Hot Rock & Alternative Songs (Billboard)	19
US Mainstream Top 40 (Billboard)	26
US Radio Songs (Billboard)	74

== Certifications ==
Certifications
Region	Certification	Certified units/sales
Australia (ARIA)	2× Platinum	140,000^{‡}
Brazil (Pro-Música Brasil)	Platinum	40,000^{‡}
Canada (Music Canada)	2× Platinum	160,000^{‡}
Mexico (AMPROFON)	Gold	70,000^{‡}
New Zealand (RMNZ)	Platinum	30,000^{‡}
United Kingdom (BPI)	Platinum	600,000^{‡}
^{‡} Sales+streaming figures based on certification alone.

== Release history ==
Release dates and formats
Region	Date	Format	Label	Ref.
Italy	September 15, 2023	Radio airplay	EMI	
United States	September 19, 2023	Contemporary hit radio	Geffen	
