= Making the Bed =

Song by Olivia Rodrigo

from the album Guts
- Released: September 8, 2023
- Studio: Amusement (Los Angeles); Electric Lady (New York City)
- Genre: Pop
- Length: 3:18
- Label: Geffen
- Songwriters: Olivia Rodrigo; Dan Nigro
- Producer: Dan Nigro

Lyric video
- "Making the Bed" on YouTube

"Making the Bed" (stylized in all lowercase) is a song by American singer-songwriter Olivia Rodrigo from her second studio album, Guts (2023). Rodrigo wrote it with its producer, Dan Nigro. The song became available as the album's sixth track on September 8, 2023, when it was released by Geffen Records. A pop song which incorporates piano, guitars, synthesizers, and percussion and evokes dream pop, "Making the Bed" has introspective lyrics which feature Rodrigo reflecting on her flaws and attempting to persevere in spite of them, as it explores her disillusionment with fame and recurring dreams.

Music critics were divided about whether it was one of the better tracks on Guts but welcomed the display of personal accountability and maturity in its lyrics. The song reached the top 20 in Australia, Canada, Ireland, New Zealand, and the United States and entered the charts in some other countries. Rodrigo performed it at the Bluebird Café, at the Grammy Museum, and during a Tiny Desk concert. She included "Making the Bed" on the set list of her 2024 concert tour, the Guts World Tour.

== Background and release ==
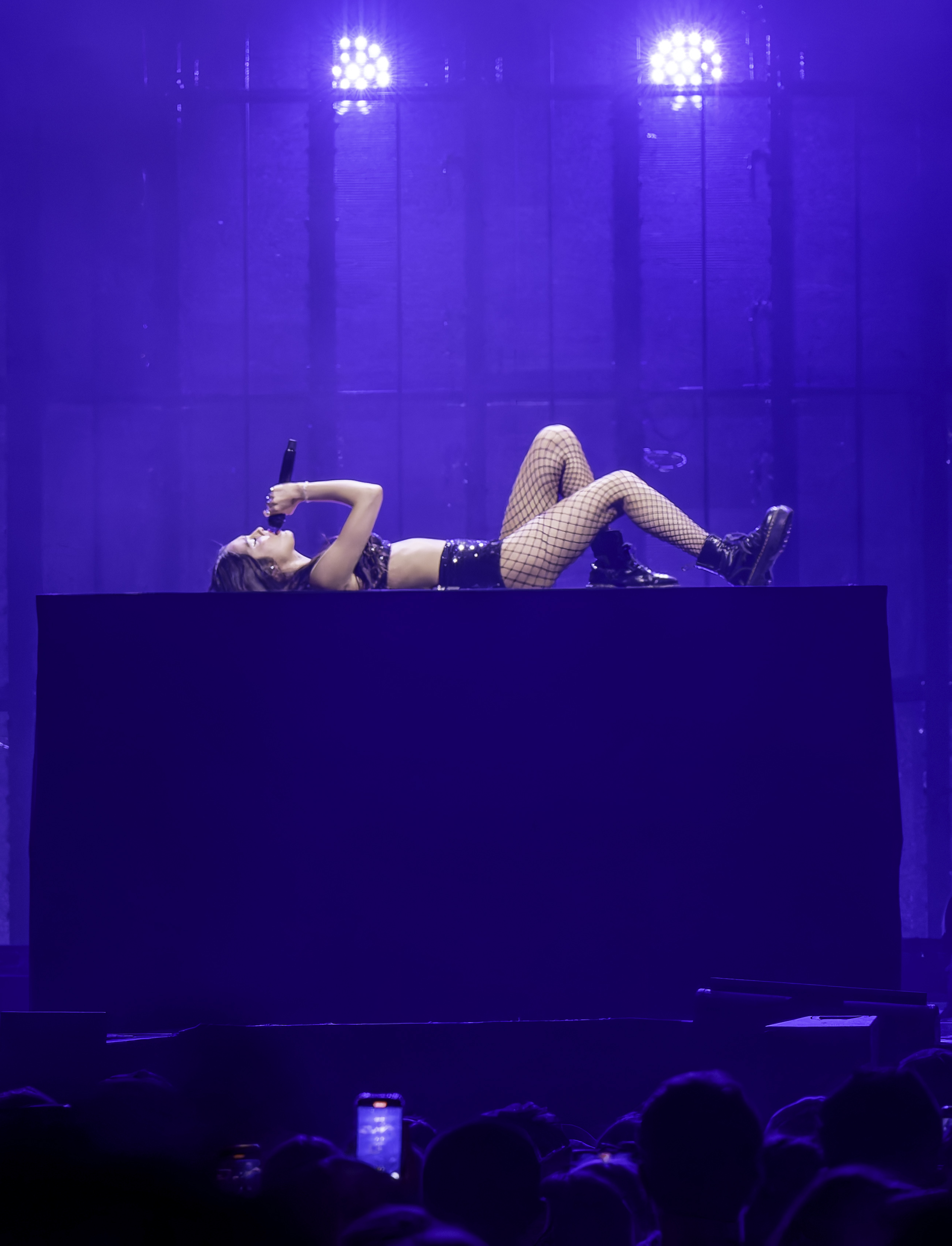
Olivia Rodrigo performing "Making the Bed" on the Guts World Tour in May 2024

Olivia Rodrigo's debut studio album, Sour (2021), was released in May 2021, following which she decided to take a break from songwriting for six months. She felt pressure to conform to people's expectations, which led her to make questionable decisions and date people she believed she should not have. Rodrigo conceived the follow-up album, Guts (2023), at the age of 19, while experiencing "lots of confusion, mistakes, awkwardness and good old fashioned teen angst". Dan Nigro returned to produce every single track on Guts, which was created over ten months, with songwriting and recording consuming the first eight and the final two being used for mixing and fine-tuning. After completing a set of gleeful and up-tempo songs for the album, Rodrigo and Nigro decided to create something more serious.

Rodrigo and Nigro wrote the song "Making the Bed" in New York, inspired by Rodrigo's belief that she was placing herself in situations or with people that did not bring her true happiness and peace, which reflected the album's general theme of taking self-responsibility and dealing with difficult relationships. She reflected on the self-doubt caused by her shifting priorities after becoming famous at the age of 19, feeling full of energy and enthusiasm but also being overwhelmed by the many fascinating people, exciting opportunities, and glamorous new experiences the industry offered her. Of more than 100 songs written for it, Rodrigo included the more rock-oriented tracks on the album because they drew a bigger reaction from her audiences during live shows.

Rodrigo announced the album title on June 26, 2023, and its lead single, "Vampire", was released four days later. On August 1, 2023, she revealed Guts's tracklist, which features "Making the Bed" as the sixth track. The song became available for digital download on the album, which was released on September 8, 2023. Its lyric video included an easter egg indicating that Rodrigo would tour in support of the album before one was officially announced. On September 29, Rodrigo performed it on a piano at the Bluebird Café. She reprised "Making the Bed" on a piano at the Grammy Museum on October 4, 2023. Rodrigo sang the song during a Tiny Desk concert in December 2023. It was included on the set list of her 2024 concert tour, the Guts World Tour. Lying on her back on a platform, Rodrigo sings "Making the Bed" with organ instrumentation and purple lights while people in the audience shine their cellphone lights. It is one of the few gentle songs in the set, which rock-influenced pop songs mostly dominate.

== Composition ==
"Making the Bed"
"Making the Bed" prominently features synth drones and gentle guitars, evoking the sound of dream pop. Its melody was compared to Kate Bush's 1978 single "Wuthering Heights".

"Making the Bed" is three minutes and 18 seconds long. Nigro handled production and vocal production, and he engineered it with Dani Perez and the assistant Austen Healey. Nigro plays guitar, piano, bass, synthesizer, and drum programming; Sam Stewart plays guitar; and Ryan Linvill plays saxophone. Serban Ghenea mixed the song at MixStar Studios in Virginia Beach, Virginia, with assistance from Bryce Bordone, and Randy Merrill mastered it. Recording took place at Amusement Studios in Los Angeles and Electric Lady Studios in New York City.

"Making the Bed" begins as a melancholic pop ballad and later prominently features synth drones and gentle guitars, evoking the sound of dream pop. The song's production has been described as hazy. According to The Independent's Helen Brown, its melody is reminiscent of Kate Bush's 1978 single "Wuthering Heights" and the intimate and slow-paced tone recalls the work of Taylor Swift. Amidst glimmering guitars, a sorrowful piano melody, steady percussion, echoing guitar fuzz, subtle keyboard tones, and the wistful twang of a reverb-laden electric guitar, Rodrigo expresses her sorrow, her voice quivering with remorse. Melissa Ruggieri of USA Today wrote that the "sumptuous melody escalates into a fury of guitars".

"Making the Bed" features Rodrigo reflecting on her flaws and attempting to persevere in spite of them, as it explores her disillusionment with fame and a recurring dream which is caused by her anxiety. Through the lens of a young adult grappling with the realities of fame, Rodrigo reflects on the challenges of growing up and the consequences of achieving her dreams. She experiences self-doubt upon realizing that she is acting older than her age and attempts to hide and "pull the sheets over my head". The song portrays her feelings of being a Hollywood misfit, as she admits to leaving old friends behind, partying with a new crowd, and pushing away the people who knew her better. She believes these new friends are not reliable, describing them as "fair weather friends". Though people tell Rodrigo they love her, she perceives this as superficial and compares it to how someone would admire a tourist attraction. Rodrigo then recounts a recurring dream of her driving a car without brakes. Despite attaining what she once desired, she realizes that fame has brought more turmoil than fulfillment: "I got the things I wanted / It's just not what I imagined."

== Critical reception ==
Some critics praised the lyricism of "Making the Bed" while others were less enthusiastic. The Guardian's Laura Snapes considered the song a standout on Guts. Likewise, Ruggieri named it one of the two best songs on the album and believed it succeeded due to Rodrigo's authenticity, without which it could have come across as "whiny". Gabriel Saulog of Billboard Philippines thought "Making the Bed" showcased the best songwriting among all the tracks and was one of the most serious compositions she had ever created. Punch Liwanag of the Manila Bulletin compared the songwriting to Taylor Swift and named it as a reflective track where Rodrigo delved into her inner thoughts. On the other hand, The Australian's Jules LeFevre believed "Making the Bed" was forgettable, and The Wall Street Journal's Mark Richardson said it was a tad overly sweet and sentimental. Spencer Kornhaber of The Atlantic considered it overly maudlin, generic, and one of the ballads where Rodrigo's straightforwardness can be vexing.

Music critics viewed Rodrigo taking accountability in the lyrics of "Making the Bed" positively. Sputnikmusic's Sowing and Rolling Stone's Larisha Paul highlighted it as an introspective song. Lucas Martins of Beats Per Minute believed the song was a rare instance on Guts where she contemplated her life in showbusiness, bringing a sense of realism that is less common in her other work. Writing for Variety, Chris Willman thought that "Making the Bed" potentially marked Rodrigo's most significant step toward a mature self-awareness on the album, as a track that shifted away from seeking retribution or placing blame and instead acknowledged that she is facing consequences of her own choices. Heather Phares of AllMusic opined that the song showcased an increase in her wisdom and injected a refreshing sense of self-awareness into the catharsis of "Drivers License".

Critics commented on the production and Rodrigo's vocal performance on "Making the Bed". DIY's Lisa Wright thought it was one of the few ballads on Guts that she did not manage to infuse with enough bold energy to seamlessly connect it with the more upbeat tracks. Mikael Wood of the Los Angeles Times noted the emotionality in Rodrigo's voice, describing it as "trembling with regret". Writing for The Daily Telegraph, Poppie Platt believed the song did not reflect any sonic or thematic growth for Rodrigo and felt like a "mere overhang from her debut".

Sheffield ranked "Making the Bed" as Rodrigo's 14th-best song in September 2023 and picked his favorite lyric: "I tell someone I love them, just as a distraction/And they tell me that they love me like I’m some tourist attraction." Nylon included "And I'm playing the victim so well in my head/ But it's me who's been making the bed" in its list of Guts's most impeccable lyrics. Austin American-Statesman's Deborah Sengupta Stith declared "I got the things I wanted / It's just not what I imagined" as one of her 10 favorite Rodrigo lines.

== Commercial performance ==
"Making the Bed" debuted at number 19 on the US Billboard Hot 100 issued for September 23, 2023. In Canada, the song entered at number 20 on the Canadian Hot 100 issued for the same date and was certified platinum by Music Canada. In the United Kingdom, it debuted at number 19 on the Official Audio Streaming Chart and Billboard. "Making the Bed" received a gold certification in the United Kingdom from the British Phonographic Industry. In Australia, the song entered at number 18 and received a gold certification from the Australian Recording Industry Association. It debuted at number 13 in New Zealand. "Making the Bed" charted at number 16 on the Billboard Global 200. The song also reached national record charts at number 14 in Ireland, number 43 in Portugal, and number 46 in Greece. It received a platinum certification in Brazil.

== Credits and personnel ==
Credits are adapted from the liner notes of Guts.

- Dan Nigro – producer, songwriter, engineer, guitar, piano, vocal producer, bass, synthesizer, drum programming, background vocals
- Olivia Rodrigo – vocals, background vocals, songwriter
- Sam Stewart – guitar
- Ryan Linvill – saxophone
- Dani Perez – engineer
- Austen Healey – record engineering assistance
- Randy Merrill – mastering
- Serban Ghenea – mixing
- Bryce Bordone – mixing assistance

== Charts ==
Chart positions for "Making the Bed"
Chart (2023)	Peak position
Australia (ARIA)	18
Canada Hot 100 (Billboard)	20
Global 200 (Billboard)	16
Greece (IFPI)	46
Ireland (Billboard)	14
New Zealand (Recorded Music NZ)	13
Portugal (AFP)	43
UK (Billboard)	19
UK Streaming (OCC)	19
US Billboard Hot 100	19

== Certifications ==
Certifications for "Making the Bed"
Region	Certification	Certified units/sales
Australia (ARIA)	Platinum	70,000^{‡}
Brazil (Pro-Música Brasil)	Platinum	40,000^{‡}
Canada (Music Canada)	Platinum	80,000^{‡}
New Zealand (RMNZ)	Gold	15,000^{‡}
United Kingdom (BPI)	Gold	400,000^{‡}
^{‡} Sales+streaming figures based on certification alone.
