= Obsessed (Olivia Rodrigo song) =

2024 single by Olivia Rodrigo

Single by Olivia Rodrigo

from the album Guts (Spilled)
- Released: March 26, 2024
- Studio: Amusement (Los Angeles)
- Genre: Pop-punk; power pop; dance-rock; pop rock
- Length: 2:50
- Label: Geffen
- Songwriters: Olivia Rodrigo; Annie Clark; Dan Nigro
- Producer: Dan Nigro

Olivia Rodrigo singles chronology
"Can't Catch Me Now" (2023)	"Obsessed" (2024)	"Drop Dead" (2026)

Music video
- "Obsessed" on YouTube

"Obsessed" (stylized in all lowercase) is a song by American singer-songwriter Olivia Rodrigo from Guts (Spilled), the 2024 deluxe edition of her second studio album, Guts (2023). Rodrigo wrote it with American musician St. Vincent and its producer, Dan Nigro. Geffen Records released it as a single alongside the deluxe edition on March 22, 2024. A pop-punk, power pop, dance-rock, and pop rock song with grunge, alternative rock, pop metal, and punk rock influences, "Obsessed" details Rodrigo's jealousy and preoccupation with her partner's ex-girlfriend.

Music critics believed "Obsessed" achieved an edgier sound than Rodrigo's previous output and directed praise towards its upbeat nature and lyrics. In the United Kingdom, the song peaked at number 10 on the UK singles chart and became Rodrigo's eighth top-10 single. It reached the top 20 in Australia, Canada, Ireland, and the United States. "Obsessed" received a platinum certification in Australia and silver in the United Kingdom.

Mitch Ryan directed the music video for "Obsessed", which depicts Rodrigo facing her partner's ex-girlfriends in a beauty pageant and performing the song in an adjoining room. She included it on the set list for her 2024–2025 concert tour, the Guts World Tour, where she sang it while spinning around and played a guitar solo. These performances received positive reviews alongside comparisons to 1990s rock artists, and the song attained viral popularity on video-sharing service TikTok.

== Background and release ==
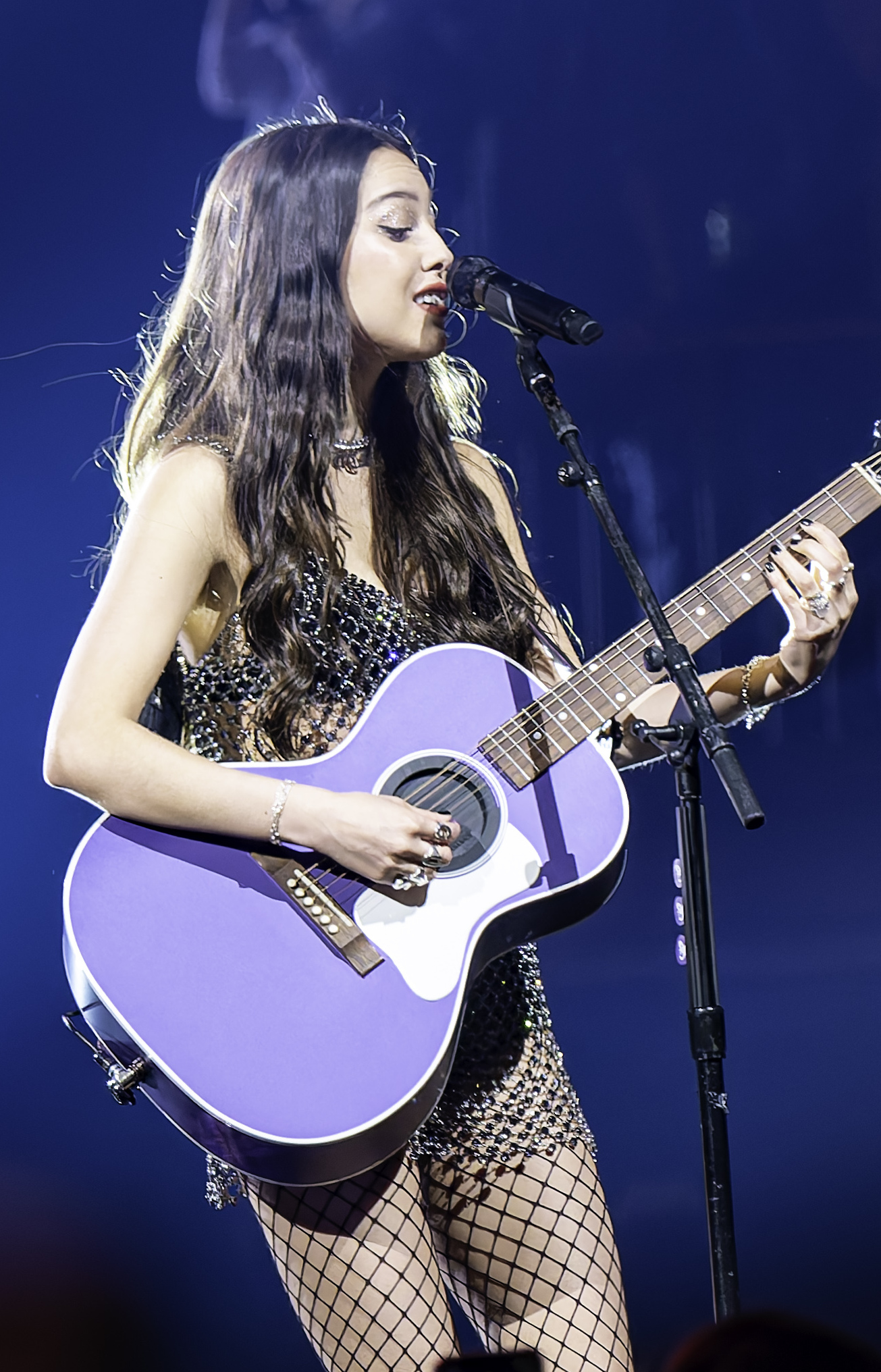
Olivia Rodrigo performing on the Guts World Tour in May 2024

At the age of 19, Olivia Rodrigo conceived her second studio album, Guts (2023), while experiencing "lots of confusion, mistakes, awkwardness & good old fashioned teen angst". Dan Nigro produced every track on it. They wrote over 100 songs, of which Rodrigo included the more rock-oriented tracks on the album because they drew a bigger reaction from her audiences during live shows. Out of the 25 songs recorded, 12 made it onto the standard edition of Guts. Rodrigo excluded some of them to not overpower the tracklist with too many similar songs and believed they would be released at some point in the future. She had recorded the track "Obsessed" in 2021 after writing it with Nigro and Annie Clark, a mentor to her during the album's creation process.

Two days before the album's release, Rodrigo uploaded a parody infomercial which teased the names of four additional tracks, including "Obsessed". They were each included as a hidden track on a different color variant of its vinyls, with "Obsessed" appearing on some of them. Third Man Records released the four tracks on a limited-edition vinyl, titled Guts: The Secret Tracks, on November 24, 2023, to commemorate Record Store Day.

In 2024, "Obsessed" became the only hidden track to be included on the set list of Rodrigo's Guts World Tour (2024–2025), and it attained viral popularity on video-sharing service TikTok. In March 2024, Rodrigo's fan hotline began playing a snippet of "Obsessed", and it was subsequently announced as a single alongside the album's deluxe edition, Guts (Spilled) (2024). She stated her enjoyment about performing the song on the Guts World Tour but noted that it had already been among her favorite tracks. Geffen Records promoted it to contemporary hit radio stations in the United States on March 26.

== Composition ==
"Obsessed"
"Obsessed" is a pop-punk, power pop, dance-rock, and pop rock song with influences of grunge, alternative rock, pop metal, and punk rock. It incorporates distorted guitars and distorted vocals.

"Obsessed" is 2 minutes and 50 seconds long. Nigro produced the song and provided vocal production, and he handled engineering with Dave Schiffman and Ryan Linvill. He played guitar, bass, synthesizer, and drum programming; St. Vincent played guitar; and Garret Ray played drums. Spike Stent mixed the song at SLS Studios in London, and Randy Merrill mastered it. Recording took place in Amusement Studios in Los Angeles.

"Obsessed" is a pop-punk, power pop, dance-rock, and pop rock song with influences of grunge, alternative rock, pop metal, and punk rock. The song opens with Rodrigo harmonizing with herself: "Da da-da-da da-da-da", before yelling with increasing force. It later incorporates distorted guitars, distorted vocals, heavy bass, and drums. "Obsessed" has gentle verses but a loud chorus, during which it becomes more panicky according to Billboard Philippines' Gabriel Saulog. Eddino Abdul Hadi of The Straits Times likened this dynamic to old alternative rock bands, and Aadya Dusad of the South China Morning Post compared the song to the work of Avril Lavigne.

The lyrics of "Obsessed" are about Rodrigo's jealousy and preoccupation with her partner's ex-girlfriend. The theme is explored through a sapphic narrative, similarly to the track "Lacy" from the album's standard edition. "Obsessed" is also about insecurity, channeling the negative inner voice in teenagers' minds, and their persistent obsessive and envious thoughts. Rodrigo admits to spending unusual amounts of time thinking about and looking at pictures of the partner's ex and researching personal details like her astrological sign and blood type. In the chorus, she wonders if the ex had slept in the partner's bed and warns him to be careful because she recalls everything he has told Rodrigo about her. In the bridge, Rodrigo asks him questions about the ex's sexual performance and behavior and if she was well-traveled and knowledgeable.

== Critical reception ==
Critical reviews for "Obsessed" were generally positive, with some highlighting its upbeat nature. Variety's Chris Willman believed that like other songs on Guts: The Secret Tracks, which were "B+ tracks at worst", it was deserving of a placement on the main edition of Guts. He and the Official Charts Company's George Griffiths both described "Obsessed" as a "banger"; Willman thought it fit with the more upbeat songs on the album, and the latter positively compared it to Katy Perry's song "I Kissed A Girl" (2008) and Charli XCX's album Sucker (2014). Notion found the song catchy, and Uproxx's Lexi Lane described it as a standout and included it in the website's weekly roundup of the Best New Pop Music.

Some critics believed "Obsessed" achieved an edgier sound than Rodrigo's previous output. Including it at number 25 in Billboard's list of the best songs of 2024 as of June, Andrew Unterberger stated that it was her "most deliciously thrashing" and "least-likely radio hit", unsure if its production hurt or helped its commercial prospects. Steffanee Wang of Nylon believed the song was the "edgiest" Rodrigo had ever sounded and she should take the same direction in her future material, and Andrew Pulver of The Guardian opined that she had never sounded more scathing or biting. Hadi described her delivery as progressively manic and thought it was perfectly complemented by the chorus's captivating hook.

Others commented on the lyrics. Hadi thought they accurately encapsulated adolescent drama, and Dusad believed "Obsessed" expertly captured the theme of insecurity in relationships and would be relatable to teenagers who are insecure about the topic as well as enjoyable at karaoke bars. She picked two of the most memorable lyrics: "I'm staring at her like I wanna get hurt" and "I'm so obsessed with your ex." The track was included on a critical list of the best songs of 2024 at number nine by Business Insider's Callie Ahlgrim.

== Commercial performance ==
"Obsessed" debuted at number 14 on the US Billboard Hot 100 issued for April 6, 2024. The song became Rodrigo's seventh to reach the top 10 of the Pop Airplay chart, at number 10. It was her ninth to achieve the same milestone on the Hot Rock & Alternative Songs chart, at number 2. In Canada, "Obsessed" entered at number 20 on the Canadian Hot 100 issued for the same date. The song debuted at number 10 on the UK Singles Chart and became Rodrigo's eighth top-10 single. It was certified gold by the British Phonographic Industry.

In Australia, "Obsessed" entered at number 16 and received a platinum certification from the Australian Recording Industry Association. The song charted at number 26 in New Zealand. It debuted at number 17 on the Billboard Global 200. "Obsessed" also reached number 12 in Ireland, number 20 on the Japan Hot Overseas chart, number 43 in Greece, number 54 in Portugal, number 59 in Sweden, number 73 in Austria and the Netherlands, and number 92 in Poland.

== Music video ==
Mitch Ryan directed the music video for "Obsessed". On March 20, 2024, Rodrigo uploaded a teaser of it, in which she proceeds into a hall full of her partner's exes in white dresses. Each woman dons a sash bearing different superlatives like "Miss Still His 'Closest Friend'", "Miss 2 Summers Ago", and "Miss Mom's Favorite", while Rodrigo's reads: "Miss Right Now". The hairstylist Clayton Hawkins styled Rodrigo's hair into rough pixie cut bangs, with gentle flowing Bohemian waves reminiscent of the 1970s and two long braids. Her outfit was a gothic and bare-shouldered black prom dress with an overlay and Steve Madden's Lotti Mary Jane loafers and socks. The video was released two days later.

In the video, Rodrigo enters a hotel ballroom and encounters the partner's exes, one of whom blows smoke towards her. The women compete in a beauty pageant titled "Exes Gala", which turns into an award show where Rodrigo presents them trophies bearing titles like "The Life of Every Fucking Party", "Good with Kids", and "She Even Speaks Kindly About Me". She gives a deadpan facial expression during most of the video, which Saulog believed represents her envy towards the exes. In other scenes, Rodrigo performs the song in an adjoining room with a tuxedo-clad band and sings the bridge while encircled by some of the exes. The video concludes with her cleaning up the venue after everyone else has left.

Saulog thought the events in the video represent the chaos in Rodrigo's mind: "[an] almost rage-filled party in her head". Rolling Stone's Tomás Mier described the video as a "fever dream", and Rania Aniftos of Billboard believed the concept flawlessly complements its lyrics about envy. It was nominated for Best Cinematography at the 2024 MTV Video Music Awards and Best International Pop Video at the 2024 UK Music Video Awards.

== Live performances ==
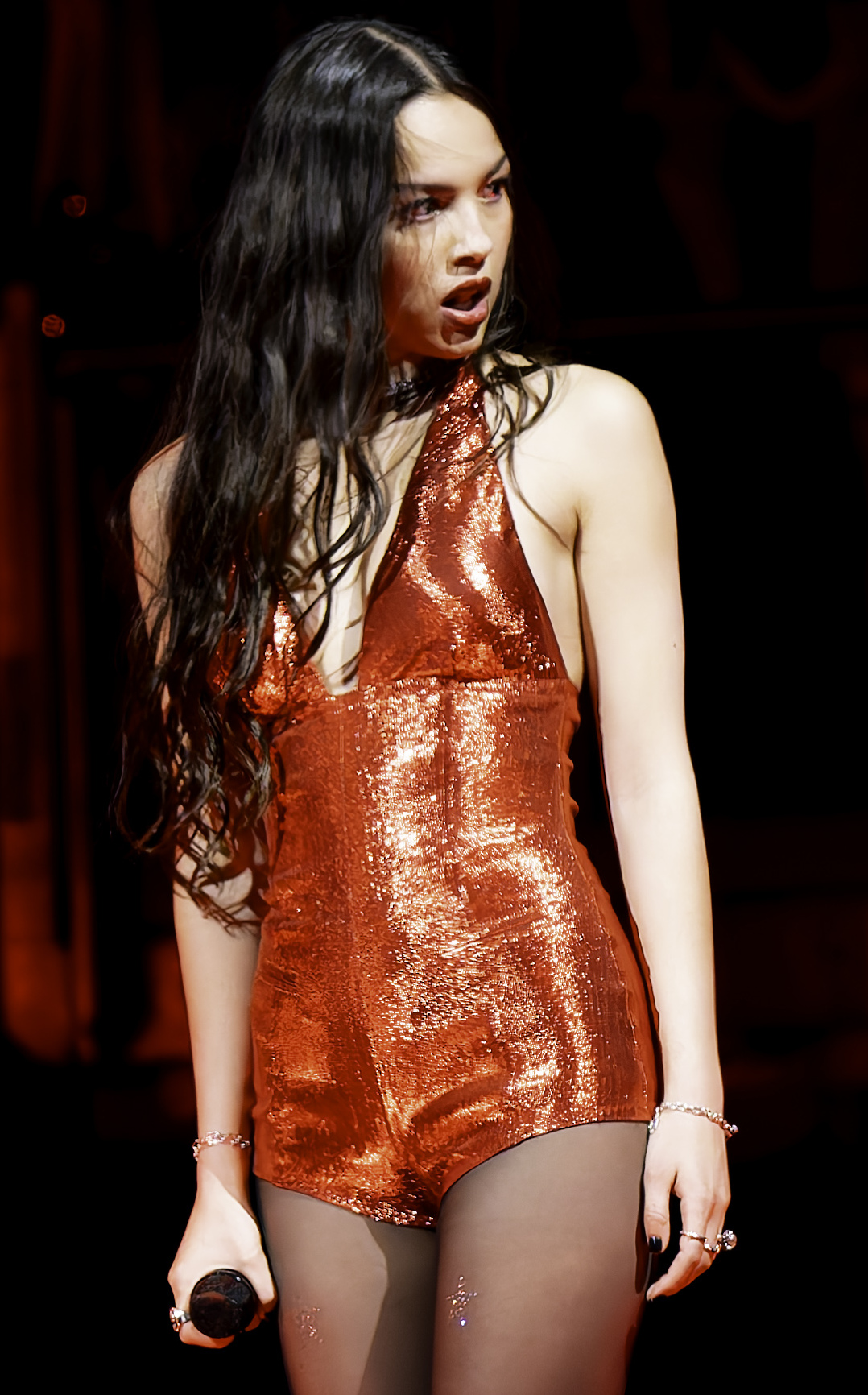
Rodrigo performing "Obsessed" in a red bodysuit on the Guts World Tour

On the Guts World Tour, "Obsessed" appears as part of a set of rock-oriented songs, alongside "Brutal" (2021), "All-American Bitch" (2023), "Good 4 U" (2021), and "Get Him Back!" (2023), which together recalls 1990s rock artists like Alanis Morissette and Gwen Stefani according to Chicago Sun-Times' Selena Fragassi. After a white sheet burning to ashes is projected on a screen during a progressive rock-metal interlude, symbolizing "the death of innocence" according to The Tennessean's Audrey Gibbs, Rodrigo sings "Brutal". She performs "Obsessed" in a red bodysuit while spinning around on the ground and being shot by a camera from below. Rodrigo is joined by a seven-piece support band, from whom she clutches a drumstick and tosses it into the audience. She concludes with a solo on Music Man's St. Vincent Goldie signature guitar.

Performances of the song received a highly positive fan reaction; many critics described it as a highlight, (Note: such as Unterberger, Gibbs, USA Today's Melissa Ruggieri, Toronto Star's Emilie Hanskamp, and Billboard's Hannah Dailey) and Mier believed it was delivered "as if it were a single". Kevin C. Johnson of St. Louis Post-Dispatch considered it the show's "most badass moment", and Melissa Ruggieri of USA Today praised the use of camera effects. Critics also characterized the performance as influenced by several genres. Michael Rietmulder of The Seattle Times thought it was influenced by grunge, and Sarah John of Nylon believed it was one of the moments that encapsulated the "pop-punk and riot-grrrl sensibilities" demonstrated throughout the show. Writing for the Vancouver Sun, Stuart Derdeyn likened the energy to Elastica and Hole and thought Rodrigo was a convincing rock performer, while USA Today's Ed Masley opined that it leaned into the reckless vitality of punk and the post-Nirvana alternative rock of the 1990s. A rehearsal video of her performing "Obsessed" was uploaded on April 9, 2024. Rodrigo opened her Lollapalooza Chile set with the song in March 2025.

== Credits and personnel ==
Credits are adapted from the liner notes of Guts (Spilled).

- Olivia Rodrigo – vocals, background vocals, songwriter, rhythm guitar on live performances
- Dan Nigro – producer, songwriter, engineer, guitar, vocal producer, bass, synthesizer, drum programming, background vocals
- St. Vincent – songwriter, guitar, background vocals
- Garret Ray – drums
- Dave Schiffman – engineer
- Ryan Linvill – engineer
- Chappell Roan – background vocals
- Randy Merrill – mastering
- Spike Stent – mixing

== Charts ==
=== Weekly charts ===
Weekly chart performance
Chart (2024)	Peak position
Australia (ARIA)	16
Austria (Ö3 Austria Top 40)	73
Canada Hot 100 (Billboard)	20
Canada CHR/Top 40 (Billboard)	15
Canada Hot AC (Billboard)	24
Global 200 (Billboard)	17
Greece International (IFPI)	43
Ireland (IRMA)	12
Japan Hot Overseas (Billboard Japan)	20
Netherlands (Single Top 100)	73
New Zealand (Recorded Music NZ)	26
Poland (Polish Streaming Top 100)	92
Portugal (AFP)	54
Sweden (Sverigetopplistan)	59
UK Singles (Official Charts)	10
US Billboard Hot 100	14
US Adult Pop Airplay (Billboard)	11
US Hot Rock & Alternative Songs (Billboard)	2
US Pop Airplay (Billboard)	10

=== Year-end charts ===
2024 year-end chart performance
Chart (2024)	Position
US Adult Top 40 (Billboard)	44
US Hot Rock & Alternative Songs (Billboard)	21
US Mainstream Top 40 (Billboard)	42

== Certifications ==
Certifications
Region	Certification	Certified units/sales
Australia (ARIA)	Platinum	70,000^{‡}
Brazil (Pro-Música Brasil)	2× Platinum	80,000^{‡}
Canada (Music Canada)	Platinum	80,000^{‡}
New Zealand (RMNZ)	Gold	15,000^{‡}
United Kingdom (BPI)	Gold	400,000^{‡}
^{‡} Sales+streaming figures based on certification alone.

== Release history ==
Release date and format
Region	Date	Format	Label	Ref.
United States	March 26, 2024	Contemporary hit radio	Geffen	
