= All-American Bitch =

2023 song by Olivia Rodrigo

Song by Olivia Rodrigo

from the album Guts
- Released: September 8, 2023
- Studio: Amusement (Los Angeles); East West (Los Angeles)
- Genre: Pop-punk; rock
- Length: 2:46
- Label: Geffen
- Songwriters: Olivia Rodrigo; Dan Nigro
- Producer: Dan Nigro

Lyric video
- "All-American Bitch" on YouTube

"All-American Bitch" (stylized in all lowercase) is a song by American singer-songwriter Olivia Rodrigo, released in 2023 from her second studio album, Guts. Rodrigo wrote the song with its producer, Dan Nigro. It became available as the album's first track on September 8, 2023, when the album was released by Geffen Records. "All-American Bitch" is a pop-punk and rock track begins with a folk and folk-pop verse and transitions into pop-punk during the chorus, incorporating influences of punk rock, grunge, and pop rock. Lyrically, it is a satirical song that explores Rodrigo's concerns about society's double standards and contradictory expectations for women.

Music critics believe "All-American Bitch" was a successful opening track and appealed to Generation Z. They described Rodrigo's vocal performance in the verses as angelic and compared the song to the work of other rock artists. In the United States, "All-American Bitch" debuted at number 13 on the Billboard Hot 100. The song reached the top 10 in Australia, Ireland, and New Zealand, receiving a double platinum certification in Brazil, platinum certifications in Australia and Canada, and a gold certification in New Zealand.

"All-American Bitch" was promoted with a rehearsal video and a Vevo Live performance in an abandoned theater. Rodrigo also performed the song on Saturday Night Live, where she stabbed a red-colored cake at a tea party and splattered a white-colored cake on her face; the performance received positive reviews from critics. She included the song on the set list of her 2024–2025 concert tour, the Guts World Tour.

== Background and release ==
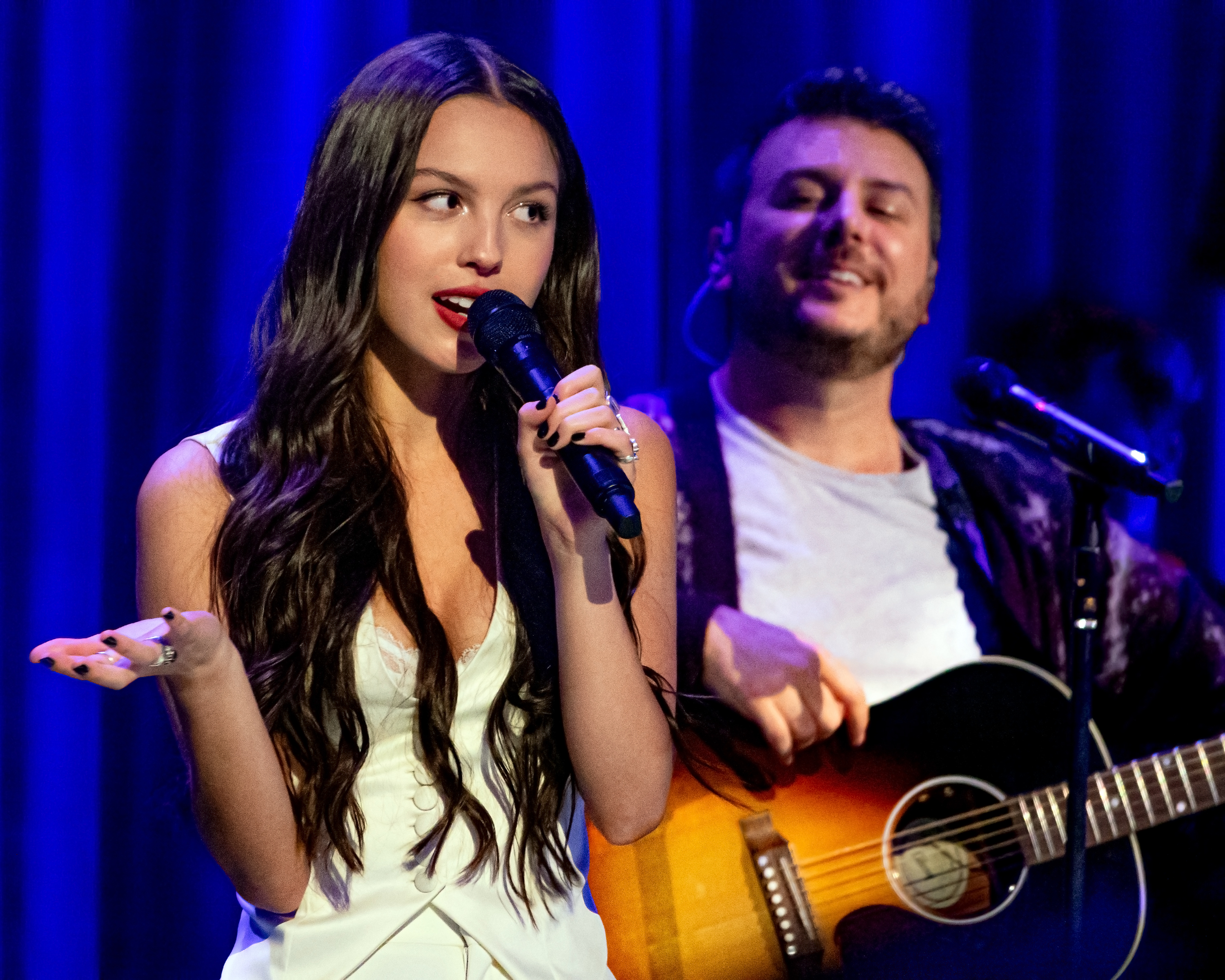
Olivia Rodrigo and Dan Nigro wrote "All-American Bitch".

Olivia Rodrigo's debut studio album, Sour (2021), was released in May 2021, following which she took a break from songwriting for six months. She conceived the follow-up album, Guts (2023), at the age of 19, while experiencing "lots of confusion, mistakes, awkwardness & good old fashioned teen angst". Sour's producer, Dan Nigro, returned to produce every track on it. Rodrigo listened to one of her favorite bands, Rage Against the Machine, on the way to studio sessions. She wrote over 100 songs with Nigro, and included the more rock-oriented tracks on the album because they drew a bigger reaction from Rodrigo's audiences during live shows.

Rodrigo and Nigro had completed two disparate sets of songs for Guts, some that were fun and uptempo and others that were serious. Nigro wondered how to "bridge this together", worried that the two halves sounded too different from each other. Rodrigo conceived the idea for a song titled "All-American Bitch" while reading the titular essay in Joan Didion's 1968 book Slouching Towards Bethlehem, wherein one of the runaway hippies describes his mother as an "all-American bitch", later reflecting: "I was like, 'Wow, that's so cool.' It's such a provocative set of words." After the song was written on a piano, Nigro was thrilled and envisioned it as the album's opening track. It was turned into a rock song with a live band. Rodrigo lost her voice after screaming for 15 minutes in Nigro's garage, which he layered to create what he described as a "choir of screams" for the song. She viewed it as one of her best-written songs and believed it captured repressed feelings she had wanted to express since the age of 15. Rodrigo had always experienced emotional turmoil over her rage and dissatisfaction, which she could not express as she felt pressured to portray gratitude, and she struggled wanting to be the "perfect American girl" but not always feeling that way.

Rodrigo announced the album title on June 26, 2023, and its lead single, "Vampire", was released four days later. On August 1, 2023, she revealed Guts' tracklist, which featured "All-American Bitch" as the first track. The song became available for digital download on the album, which was released on September 8, 2023. A rehearsal video accompanied its release, in which Rodrigo sports a shirt with a picture of Fiona Apple.

== Composition ==
"All-American Bitch"
"All-American Bitch" begins as a folk and folk-pop song and transitions into pop-punk during the chorus. Rodrigo's tone is gentle in the verses and furious in the choruses.

"All-American Bitch" is two minutes and 45 seconds long. It was recorded at Amusement Studios and East West Studios in Los Angeles. Nigro engineered the song with Sam Stewart, Sterling Laws, Dave Schiffman, and Jasmine Chen and provided production and vocal production. He played acoustic guitar, electric guitar, percussion, bass, synthesizer, and drum programming; Stewart played acoustic guitar and electric guitar; Laws played drums; and Ryan Linvill played bass. Spike Stent mixed the song at SLS Studios in London, and Randy Merrill mastered it.

"All-American Bitch" is a pop-punk and rock song that begins with a folk and folk-pop verse, and transitions into pop-punk during the chorus, incorporating influences of punk rock, grunge, and pop rock. Spin's Ilana Kaplan believed the song combines Hole's grunge sound with the pop-punk essence of Avril Lavigne and the fictional band Pink Slip from the 2003 movie Freaky Friday. It begins with gently strummed acoustic guitars and Rodrigo delivers falsetto vocals with a soft coo. She assumes a gentle tone in the verses and a furious one in the choruses. A full band plays electric guitars and drums in the chorus as Rodrigo's delivery gets more aggressive. She screams loudly after singing the song's lyric about "scream[ing] inside". Hannah Dailey of Billboard believed it shifts from "ethereal choral moments to screamed grungey punk sections", and Heather Phares of AllMusic compared the transition to the work of Phoebe Bridgers and Courtney Love. Rodrigo credited the transition to the influence of Rage Against the Machine, which American Songwriter's Patrick Hosken also observed. Writing for The Forty-Five, Rhian Daly thought Rodrigo's delivery went from "pretty to blood-curdling", and Pitchfork's Cat Zhang likened her jeering tone to Lavigne and the All-American Rejects. The song's production received comparisons to Bikini Kill, Sleater-Kinney, and Paramore.

"All-American Bitch" is a satirical song, in which Rodrigo expresses concerns about society's difficult expectations for women by sarcastically describing herself as someone who satisfies them. She uses pop culture references to suggest that the expectations are contradictory in nature, as women are expected to be alluring yet innocent, selfless yet ambitious, and also constantly grateful: "I am light as a feather, I'm as stiff as a board." Among other inconsistencies, Rodrigo perceives that they are expected to allow crude jokes to pass unchallenged, be empathetic but never to the point of making others uncomfortable, never show their anger, and internalize their emotions. In the chorus, Rodrigo announces that she is aware of her age and acts accordingly, reflecting a common motif in most of her music. She references the Kennedy family while declaring her desire to meet ideals: "I got class and integrity, just like a goddamn Kennedy". Some lyrics focus specifically on Rodrigo's experiences as a famous woman and how prominent women face pressure to not appear too emotional. The song closes out with Rodrigo alluding to her award acceptance speeches in the final lines. Writing for The Guardian, Laura Snapes described the song as "a satirical diatribe against the expectations and double standards she still feels bound by", and PopMatters' Jeffrey Davies called it a 2023 version of Meredith Brooks's 1997 single "Bitch".

== Critical reception ==
Music critics believed "All-American Bitch" fulfilled its job as the opening track of Guts. (Note: These critics included Billboard's Jason Lipshutz, Slant Magazine's Charles Lyons-Burt, The Australian's Jules LeFevre, and Elle's Erica Gonzales.) Elle's Erica Gonzales thought it was a "killer opener", and The Australian's Jules LeFevre opined the song was an ideal way to begin the album. Rob Sheffield of Rolling Stone thought it started Guts off with "a fantastic pop-punk angst rant", and Sowing of Sputnikmusic believed that the album was irrefutably successful and this began with the song. Writing for Billboard, Jason Lipshutz ranked "All-American Bitch" as Guts' second best track and thought it proved that Rodrigo had a talent for "genre refraction". He, Sheffield, and The New York Times' Lindsay Zoladz each drew parallels between the song and Sour's opener "Brutal".

Reviewers praised Rodrigo's vocal performance and the production of "All-American Bitch". Kaplan and The A.V. Club's Mary Kate Carr opined that the song would be suitable to soundtrack the 1999 film 10 Things I Hate About You. Punch Liwanag of the Manila Bulletin believed the production and Rodrigo's vocals on "All-American Bitch" came across as effortless, and Gabriel Saulog of Billboard Philippines thought the guitar riff flawlessly captured her turmoil and inner struggles. Gonzales opined the drums in the chorus of "All-American Bitch" hit "like a tantrum" and the melody oscillated from "sweet to sour" and "angelic to chaotic". Several critics described Rodrigo's vocals in the verses as angelic, and MusicOMH's John Murphy believed her screams in the latter half were attention-grabbing and could compete with Black Francis.

Critics were also positive about the lyrical themes of "All-American Bitch" and believed it captured feelings experienced by Generation Z. Beats Per Minute's Lucas Martins thought the song combined youthful drama and introspection to create an earnest expression of frustration, which embodied Rodrigo's generation and resonated perfectly with the zeitgeist. Chris Willman of Variety opined that it tapped into a significant aspect of Rodrigo's appeal, embracing the essence of adolescence without attempting to sound "too seasoned" prematurely. The Line of Best Fit's Matthew Kim viewed "All-American Bitch" as a compelling work of social commentary, and Lipshutz stated his respect for the lyrics about Rodrigo's award acceptance speeches. Writing for the Chicago Tribune, Bob Gendron called the song a potential "generational anthem".

Reviewers highlighted specific lyrics and some included "All-American Bitch" on best-of-2023 lists. Sheffield ranked it as Rodrigo's fourth-best song in September 2023, describing it as a display of her attitude and the "perfect theme song" for Guts. He picked his favorite lyric: "I know my age and I act like it/I got what you can't resist/I'm a perfect all-American bitch." GQ placed the Kennedy reference in its list of the album's standout and "gutsiest" lyrics, and Nylon included it alongside the titular lines in its list of Guts' impeccable lyrics. "All-American Bitch" was placed on critical lists of the best songs of 2023 at number five by BBC News and in the top twenty by Esquire. The latter magazine's Bria McNeal believed that Rodrigo traipsed through an age-old story, but she transformed it into something completely modern and displayed "perfect, unfiltered rage against the machine".

== Commercial performance ==
"All-American Bitch" debuted at number 13 on the US Billboard Hot 100 issued for September 23, 2023. In Canada, the song entered at number 15 on the Canadian Hot 100 issued for the same date and was certified double platinum by Music Canada. It debuted at number 78 on the UK Singles Chart. "All-American Bitch" received a gold certification in the United Kingdom from the British Phonographic Industry, and the Official Charts Company declared it her 17th-biggest song in the country in February 2024.

In Australia, "All-American Bitch" entered at number 10 and became Rodrigo's eighth top-10 song. The song was certified platinum by the Australian Recording Industry Association (ARIA) for selling 70,000 equivalent units. It debuted at number seven in New Zealand and became her 10th top-10 song. "All-American Bitch" received a gold certification from Recorded Music NZ. The song charted at number nine on the Billboard Global 200. Elsewhere, it reached national record charts at number 7 on the Sweden Heatseeker chart, number 8 in Ireland, number 22 in Singapore, number 29 in Greece, number 34 in Portugal, number 96 in Poland, and number 171 in France. "All-American Bitch" received a double platinum certification in Brazil.

== Live performances and other usage ==
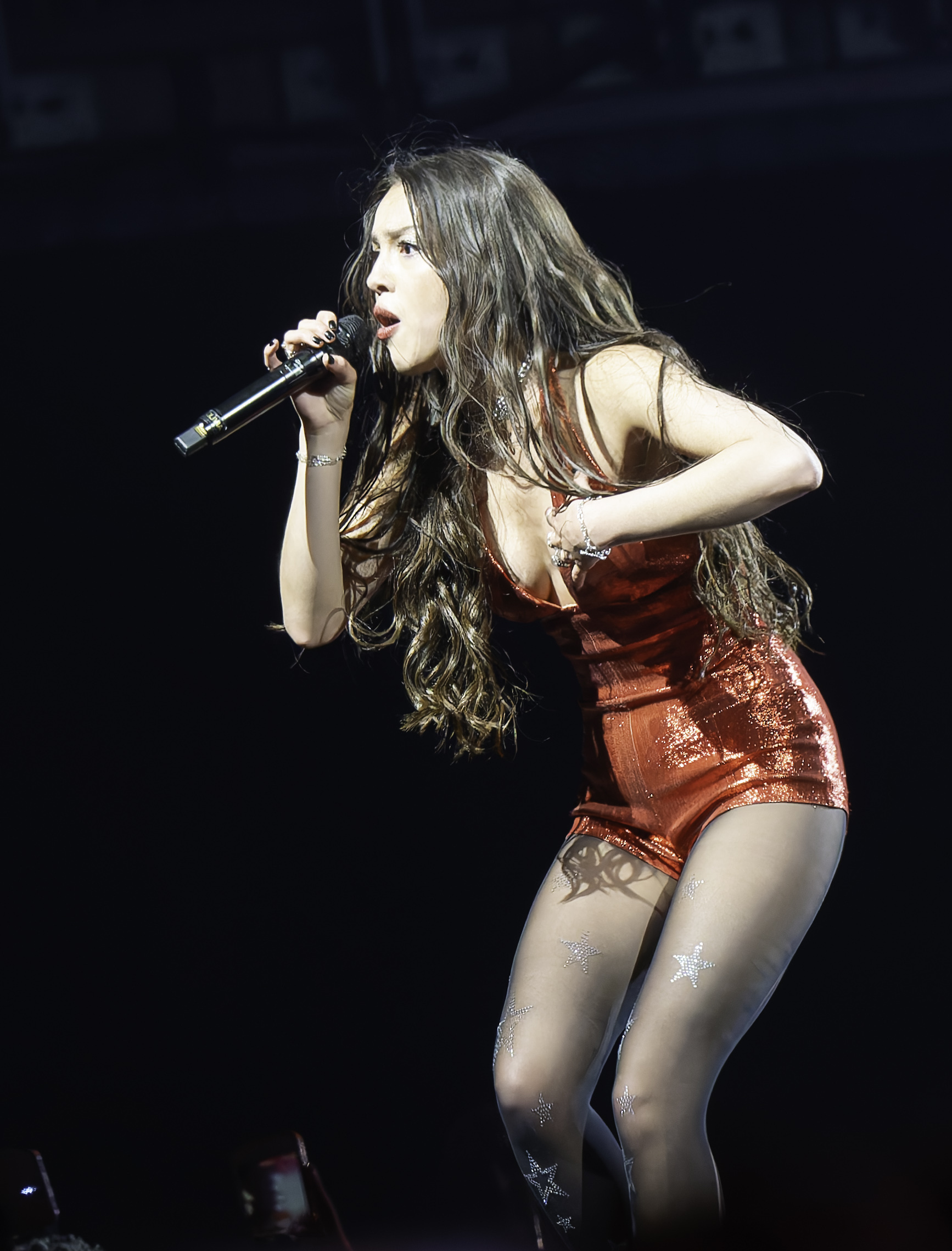
Rodrigo performing "All-American Bitch" on the Guts World Tour in May 2024

Rodrigo performed "All-American Bitch" at the Ace Hotel Los Angeles on October 9, 2023, in an exclusive concert for American Express cardholders. On December 1, 2023, she reprised the song at the KIIS-FM Jingle Ball.

Rodrigo sang "All-American Bitch" on Saturday Night Live on December 9. The performance began with her innocently sitting at a tea party in a high-neck pink dress, drinking tea behind a table covered with cakes and other items and humming soft vocals. During the chorus, Rodrigo jumped up and laid down on the table, stabbing one cake with a knife and dancing on the others, as the lights changed from white to quick red flashes to reflect the change in her mood. As the song approached a climax, she screamed while splattering red-colored cake on her face. Rodrigo concluded by sticking her tongue out for the camera. The performance received positive reviews, with critics describing it as stunning, stellar, scorching, and memorable. Exclaim!'s Vish Khanna called it "a blast of theatrical mall punk" and believed the props were used creatively and Rodrigo was mesmerizing. The bakery that provided 20 cakes for the performance received attention on social media. On December 13, the singer Noelle Denton alleged that the concept was "stolen" from the music video for her 2021 song "Your Mom Calls Me" and the creative director might have seen her video when it was shared by a mutual friend.

On December 15, Rodrigo uploaded a Vevo Live performance of "All-American Bitch", in which she performed in an abandoned theater in a shiny blue dress. The song was included on the set list of her 2024–2025 concert tour, the Guts World Tour, as part of a set of rock-oriented songs, alongside "Brutal", "Obsessed" (2024), "Good 4 U" (2021), and "Get Him Back!" (2023). The set recalls 1990s rock artists like Alanis Morissette and Gwen Stefani according to Chicago Sun-Times' Selena Fragassi. Rodrigo performed it in a red bodysuit while red talking lips, pictures, and news stories symbolizing misogyny and unattainable beauty ideals were projected on a screen behind her. She replaced the word "hips" and sang the original lyric: "Perfect all-american tits". Midway, she asked the crowd to think of a person or thing that really upset them and scream, to which the audience obliged; Rania Aniftos of Billboard described this as "a hilarious and healing moment of emotion" and included it among the show's five best moments, with Carly May Gravley of Dallas Observer commented that it led to an intense emotional release and left everyone's hearing permanently damaged. Rodrigo reprised "All-American Bitch" during her Lollapalooza Chile set in March 2025. The song appeared in the trailer for the Apple TV+ series The Buccaneers (2023).

In November 2025, the song was featured in a joint Instagram video by the White House and the Department of Homeland Security that showed Immigration and Customs Enforcement officers detaining and deporting people to promote self-deportation as an alternative. Rodrigo commented on the post, "don't ever use my songs to promote your racist, hateful propaganda."

== Credits and personnel ==
Credits are adapted from the liner notes of Guts.

- Dan Nigro – producer, songwriter, engineer, acoustic guitar, electric guitar, percussion, vocal producer, bass, synthesizer, drum programming, background vocals
- Olivia Rodrigo – vocals, background vocals, songwriter
- Sam Stewart – engineer, acoustic guitar, electric guitar
- Sterling Laws – drums, engineer
- Dave Schiffman – engineer
- Jasmine Chen – engineer
- Ryan Linvill – bass
- Randy Merrill – mastering
- Spike Stent – mixing

== Charts ==
=== Weekly charts ===
Weekly chart performance for "All-American Bitch"
| Chart (2023) | Peak position |
|---|---|
| Australia (ARIA) | 10 |
| Canada Hot 100 (Billboard) | 15 |
| France (SNEP) | 171 |
| Global 200 (Billboard) | 9 |
| Greece (IFPI) | 29 |
| Ireland (Billboard) | 8 |
| New Zealand (Recorded Music NZ) | 7 |
| Poland (Polish Streaming Top 100) | 96 |
| Portugal (AFP) | 34 |
| Singapore (RIAS) | 22 |
| Sweden Heatseeker (Sverigetopplistan) | 7 |
| UK Singles (Official Charts) | 78 |
| US Billboard Hot 100 | 13 |
| US Hot Rock & Alternative Songs (Billboard) | 4 |

=== Year-end charts ===
Year-end chart performance for "All-American Bitch"
| Chart (2023) | Position |
|---|---|
| US Hot Rock & Alternative Songs (Billboard) | 48 |
| Chart (2024) | Position |
| US Hot Rock & Alternative Songs (Billboard) | 68 |

== Certifications ==
Certifications for "All-American Bitch"
| Region | Certification | Certified units/sales |
|---|---|---|
| Australia (ARIA) | Platinum | 70,000^{‡} |
| Brazil (Pro-Música Brasil) | 2× Platinum | 80,000^{‡} |
| Canada (Music Canada) | 2× Platinum | 160,000^{‡} |
| New Zealand (RMNZ) | Gold | 15,000^{‡} |
| United Kingdom (BPI) | Gold | 400,000^{‡} |
^{‡} Sales+streaming figures based on certification alone.
