= Aidha =

- Founded: 2006
- Type: Non-governmental organization
- Registration no.: 201006653E
- Region served: Singapore
- Key people: Jacqueline Loh (CEO)
- Website: www.aidha.org

Aidha is a non-governmental organisation in Singapore. It provides financial literacy and self-development training programmes for foreign domestic workers and lower-income women, and empower them to transform their lives through sustainable wealth creation.

== History ==
Aidha is a Sanskrit word which means "That to which we aspire".

== Training programmes ==
The following courses are provided to help domestic workers develop savings habits and skills needed to start a sustainable business for their families.

- Financial literacy course (such as Money management)
- Computer literacy course
- Leadership course
- Entrepreneurial skills course
