= Lady Gaga videography =

Videos and media by American singer

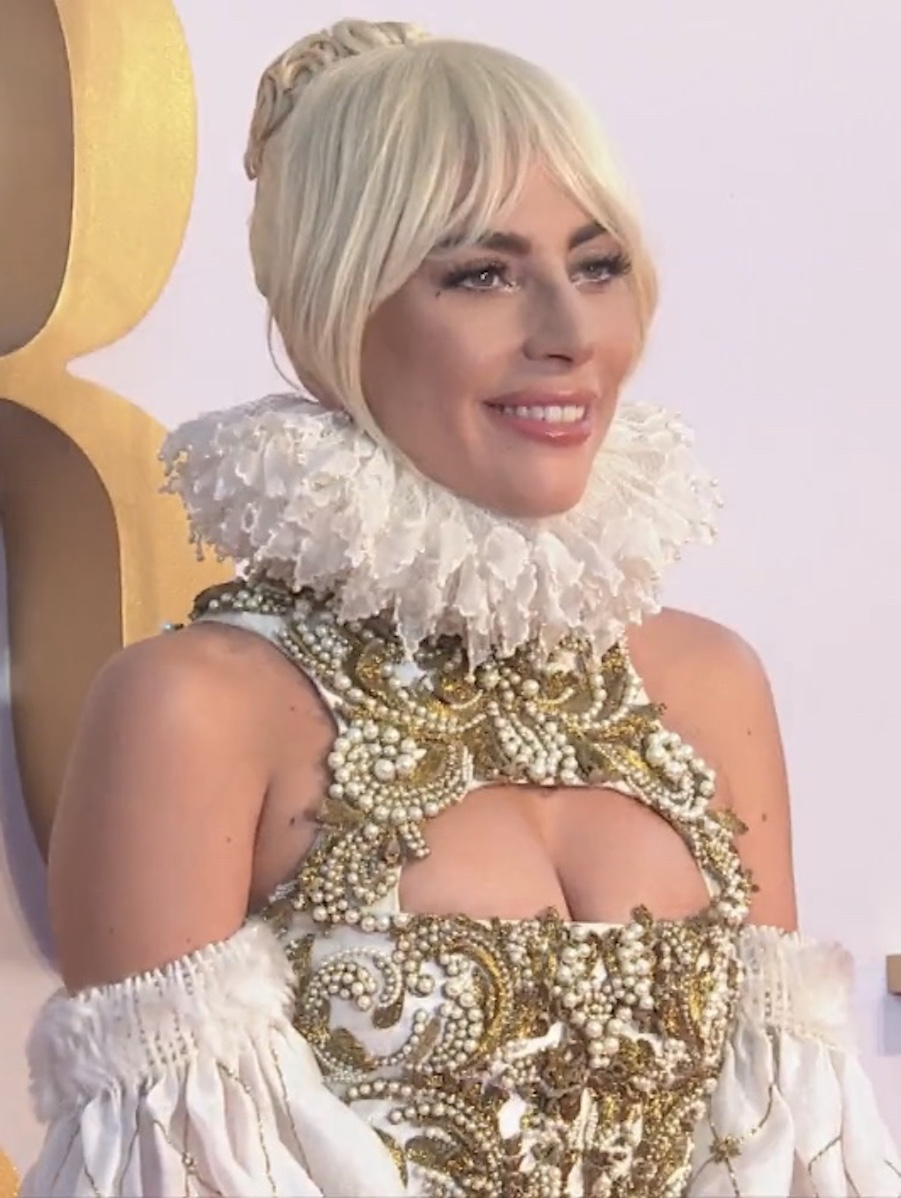
Lady Gaga at A Star is Born (2018) premiere in London

American singer Lady Gaga has released three video albums and has been featured in over fifty music videos. From her debut album The Fame (2008), she released music videos for the singles "Just Dance", "Poker Face", "Eh, Eh (Nothing Else I Can Say)", "LoveGame", and "Paparazzi". In the latter, Gaga portrays a doomed starlet taking revenge on her lover. She also shot a video for the album's promotional single "Beautiful, Dirty, Rich". Gaga reissued her first album as The Fame Monster (2009), preceded by a music video for the lead single "Bad Romance", which won a Grammy Award for Best Music Video and seven MTV Video Music Awards, including Video of the Year in 2010. The following year, Jonas Åkerlund directed the music video for "Telephone"—a continuation of "Paparazzi"—which was shot as a short film. It received an MTV Video Music Award for Video of the Year nomination, and was named the Best Music Video of the Decade by Billboard in January 2015. For her 2010 video "Alejandro", Gaga received positive reviews from critics, though she was criticized by the Catholic League that alleged blasphemy.

Gaga's second studio album Born This Way (2011) released the music video for the eponymous lead single, in which she gives birth to a new race. The music video won the Best Female Video and Best Video with a Social Message awards at the 2011 MTV Video Music Awards. In the following video, "Judas", she portrays Mary Magdalene, and Norman Reedus plays the title role. The video for "The Edge of Glory" consists mostly of interchanging shots of Gaga dancing and singing on the street and was considered the simplest of her career. In the same year, she released "You and I", which focuses on her trying to get her boyfriend back in Nebraska. She also introduces her male alter ego Jo Calderone in the video. Gaga directed her 14-minute video for "Marry the Night", which narrates her story to find success in the music industry, but she ultimately suffers setback.

In 2013, Gaga released her third album Artpop, with "Applause" as its lead single, whose music video includes artistic and complex scenes. The 11-minute video for "G.U.Y." was filmed at the Hearst Castle, and features cameos from Andy Cohen and The Real Housewives of Beverly Hills stars. In 2014, Gaga released a jazz album with Tony Bennett called Cheek to Cheek, which generated four studio videos showing the album's recording process. In 2015, she released the music video for "Til It Happens to You", a song about campus rape in the United States. Her fifth studio album, Joanne, was released in 2016, and the music video for its lead single, "Perfect Illusion", was shot in the desert with a story that continues in her subsequent videos "Million Reasons", "John Wayne", and "Joanne". Gaga's sixth studio album Chromatica (2020) spawned the music video for the lead single "Stupid Love", followed by "Rain on Me", which features Ariana Grande. She also released a short film for "911", which focuses on a variety of surreal hallucination she has after getting involved in a serious car accident. As part of Love for Sale's (2021) promotion, Gaga and Bennett released numerous studio videos shot during recording sessions of each song.

Gaga has appeared in television shows, including in guest judging roles in American Idol and So You Think You Can Dance, as well as starring in an episode of The Simpsons. She is also featured in several movies and commercials, and has held two Thanksgiving television specials—A Very Gaga Thanksgiving (2011) and Lady Gaga and the Muppets Holiday Spectacular (2013). Gaga starred in the fifth season of the horror anthology series American Horror Story, entitled Hotel (2015–2016), for which she won a Golden Globe Award for Best Actress – Miniseries or Television Film. She also appeared in its sixth season, entitled Roanoke (2016). Gaga was later the focus of the 2017 documentary Gaga: Five Foot Two, which explored the creation of Joanne and her preparation for the Super Bowl LI halftime show. She went onto star as a singer named Ally in the successful musical romantic drama A Star Is Born (2018) alongside Bradley Cooper. For her work, Gaga was nominated for an Academy Award, a BAFTA Award, a Golden Globe Award and a Screen Actors Guild Award for Best Actress, while winning the Critics' Choice and National Board of Review awards. Her second leading role was in the biographical crime film House of Gucci, released in 2021. Gaga starred as Harley Quinn alongside Joaquin Phoenix as the Joker in Todd Phillips' musical psychological thriller Joker: Folie à Deux, which was released in 2024.

== Music videos ==
Key
•	Denotes music videos directed by Lady Gaga

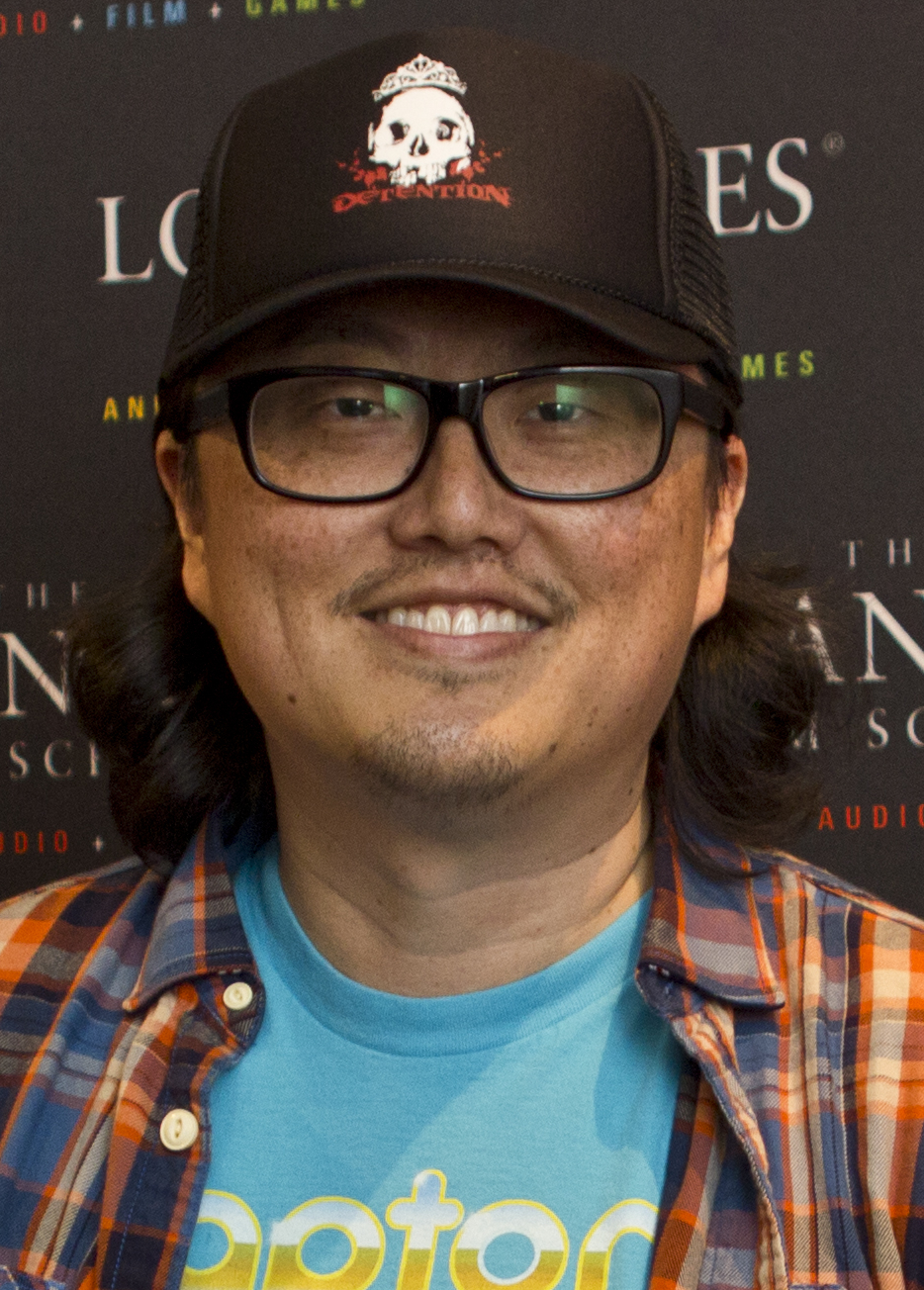
The music videos for "Eh, Eh (Nothing Else I Can Say)" and "LoveGame" were directed by Joseph Kahn.

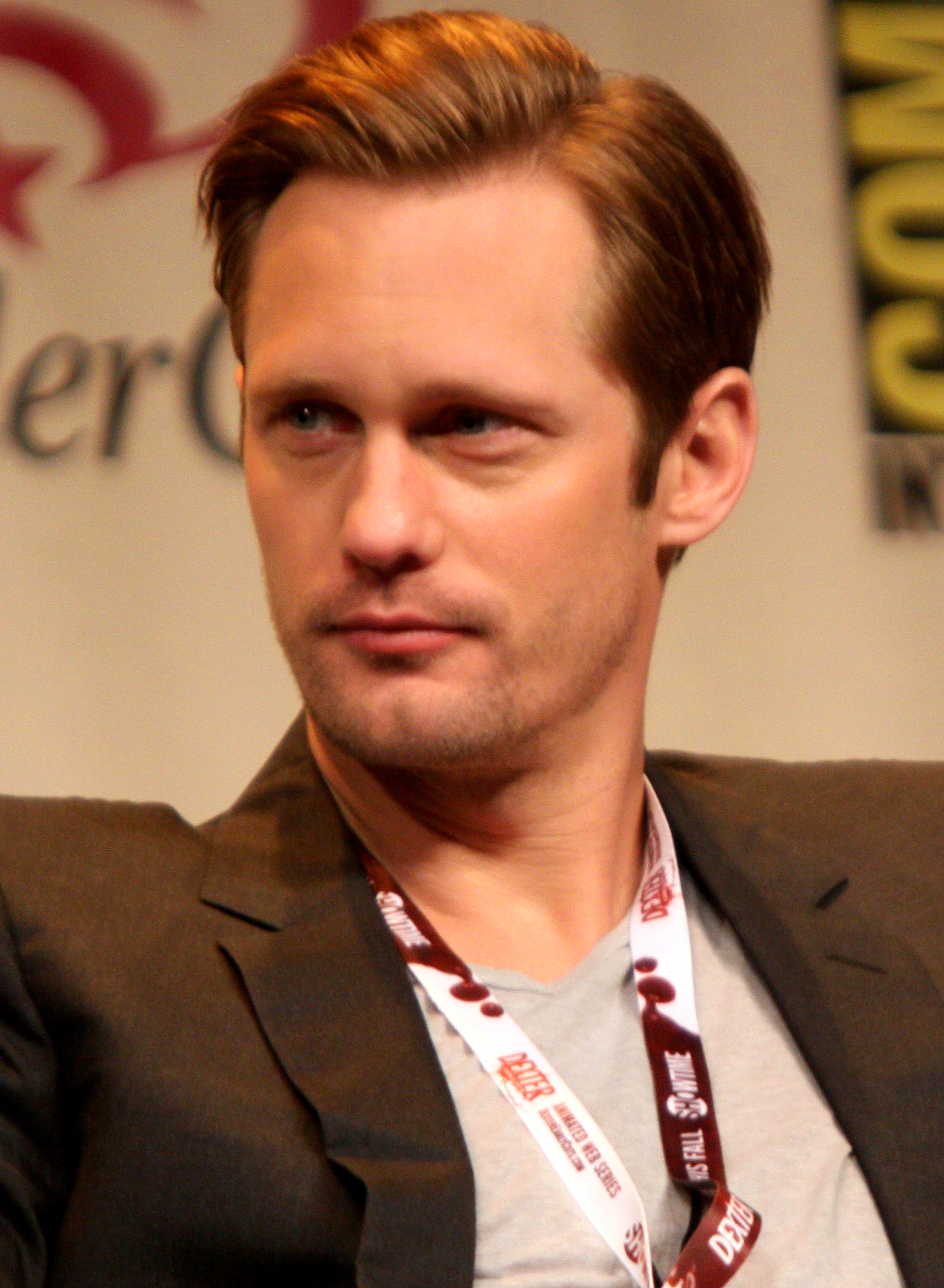
Swedish actor Alexander Skarsgård appears as Gaga's boyfriend in the video for "Paparazzi".

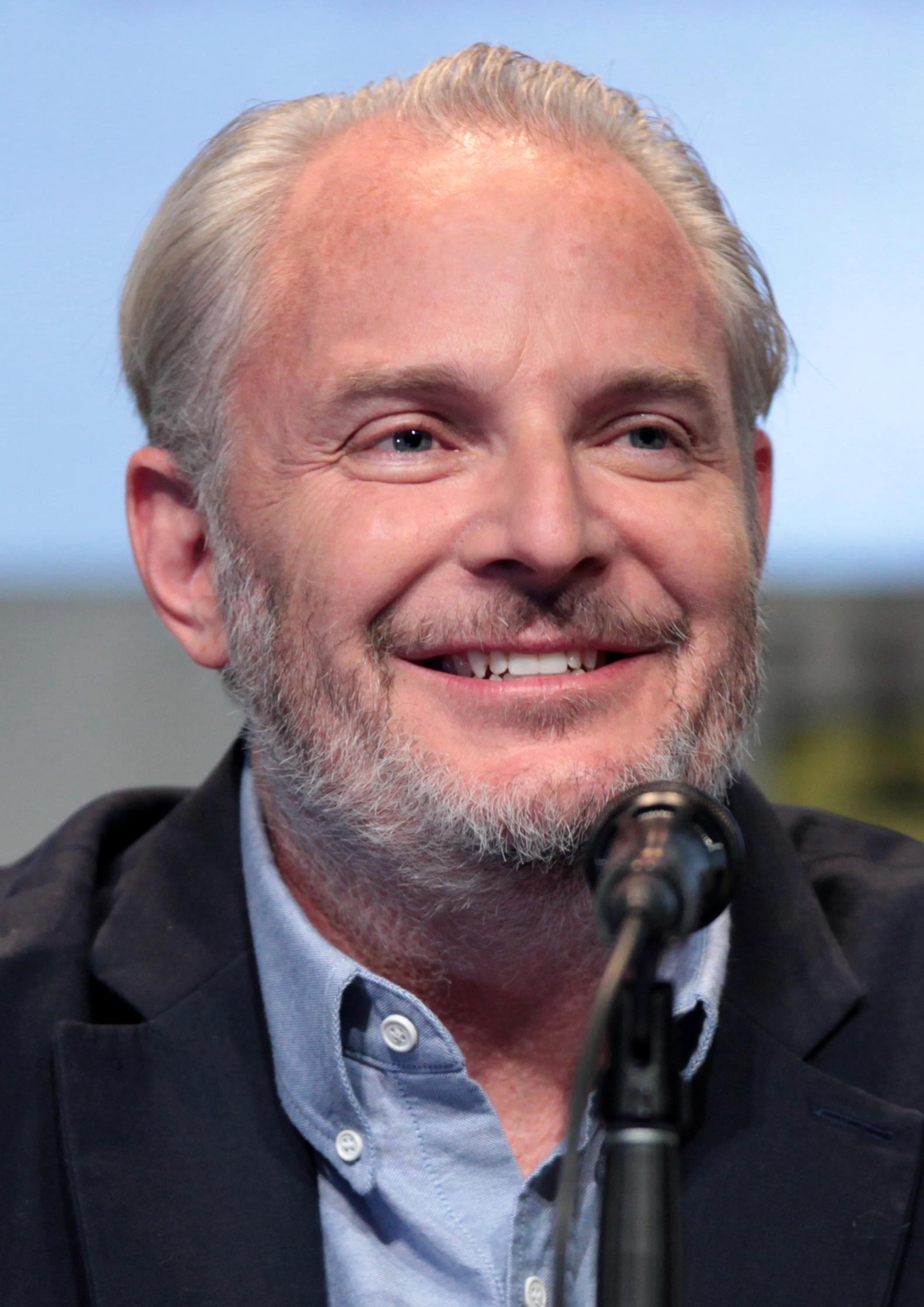
Francis Lawrence directed the music video for "Bad Romance".

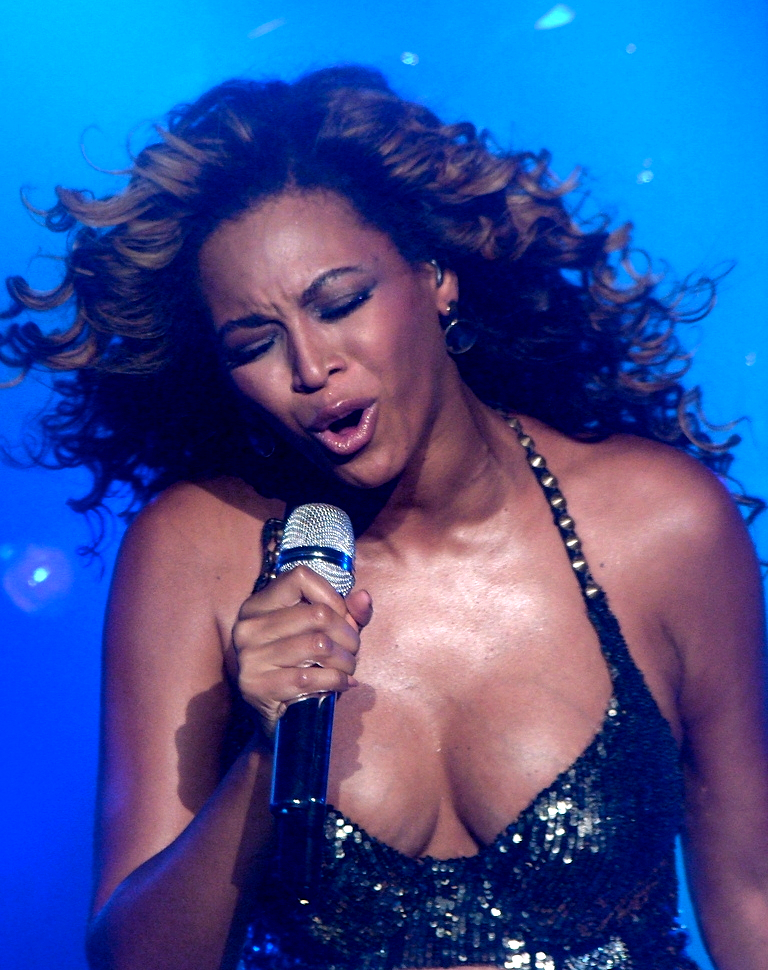
Beyoncé features in the music videos for "Video Phone" and "Telephone".

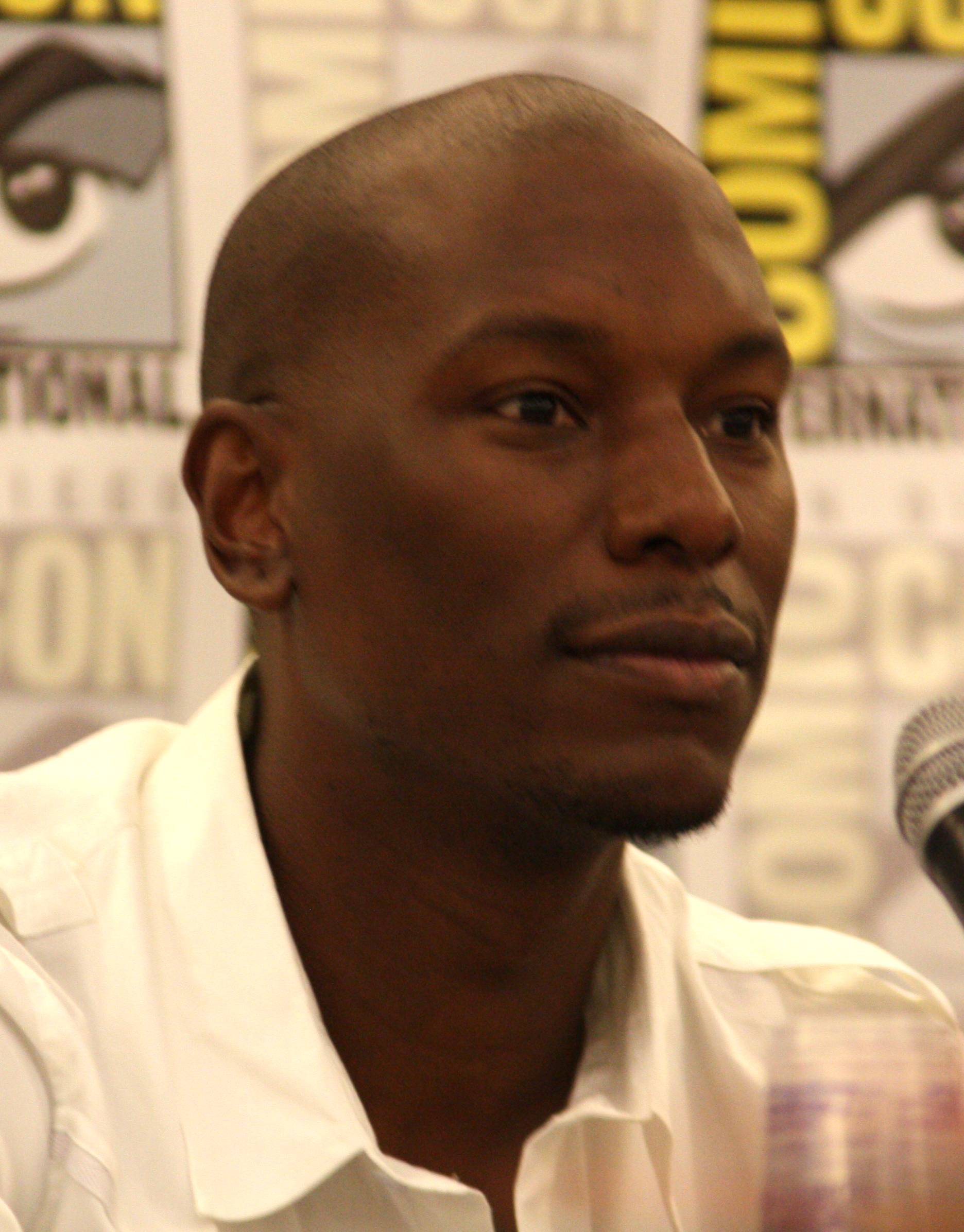
Tyrese Gibson makes a cameo appearance in the "Telephone" video.

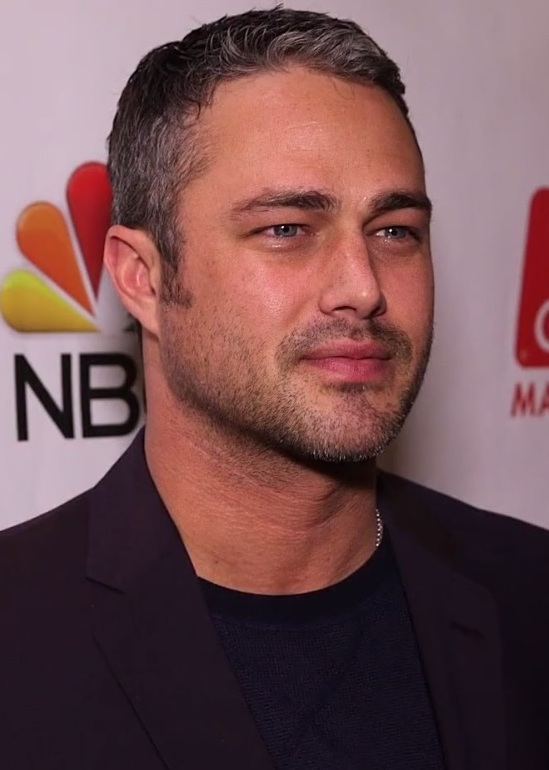
Taylor Kinney plays a mad scientist in the music video for "You and I".

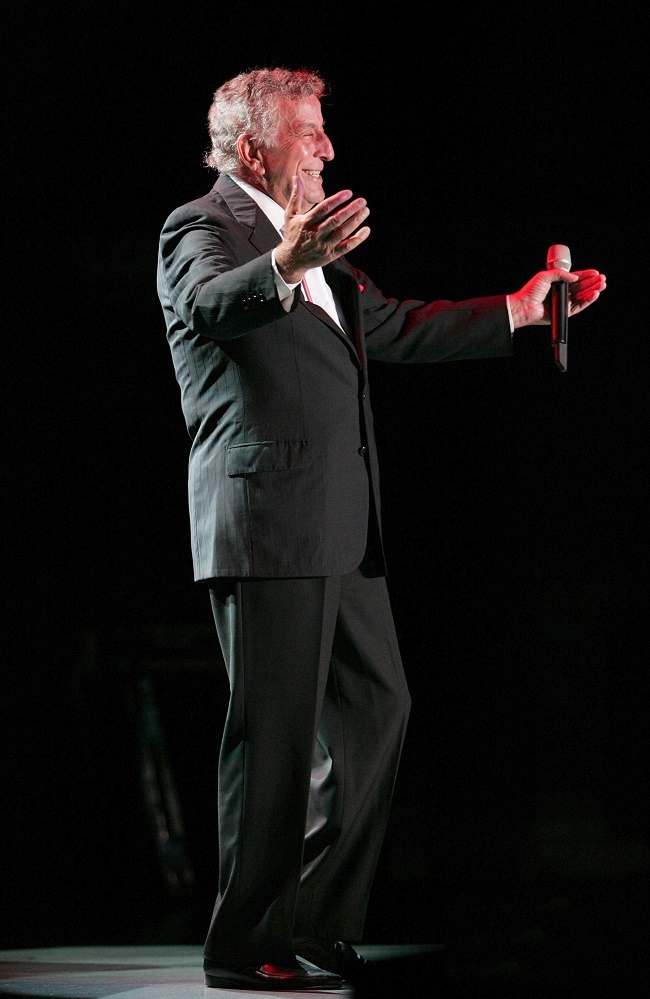
Tony Bennett appears in the music video for "The Lady Is a Tramp" and many others from Cheek to Cheek (2014) and Love for Sale (2021).

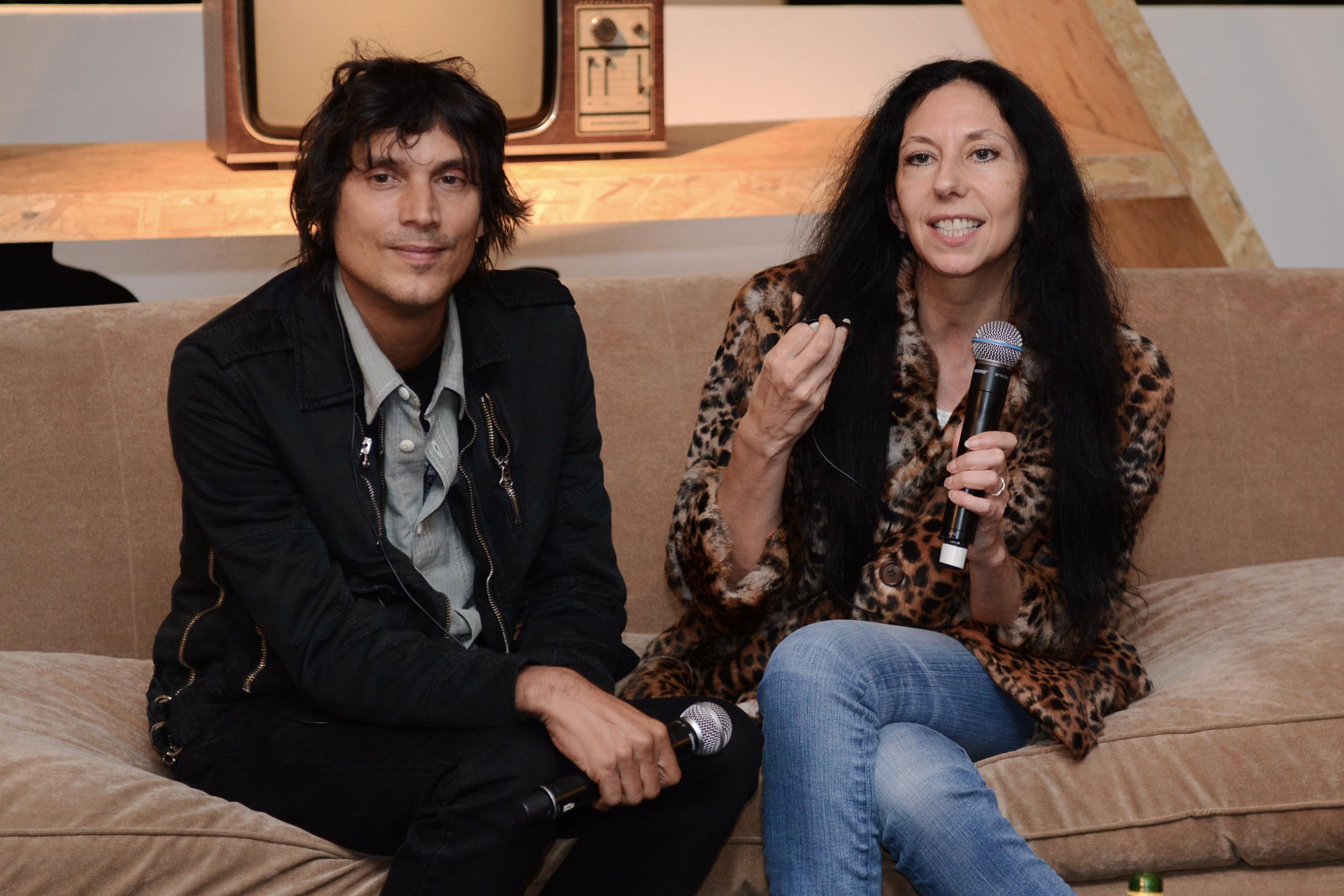
The music video for "Applause" was directed by Inez and Vinoodh.

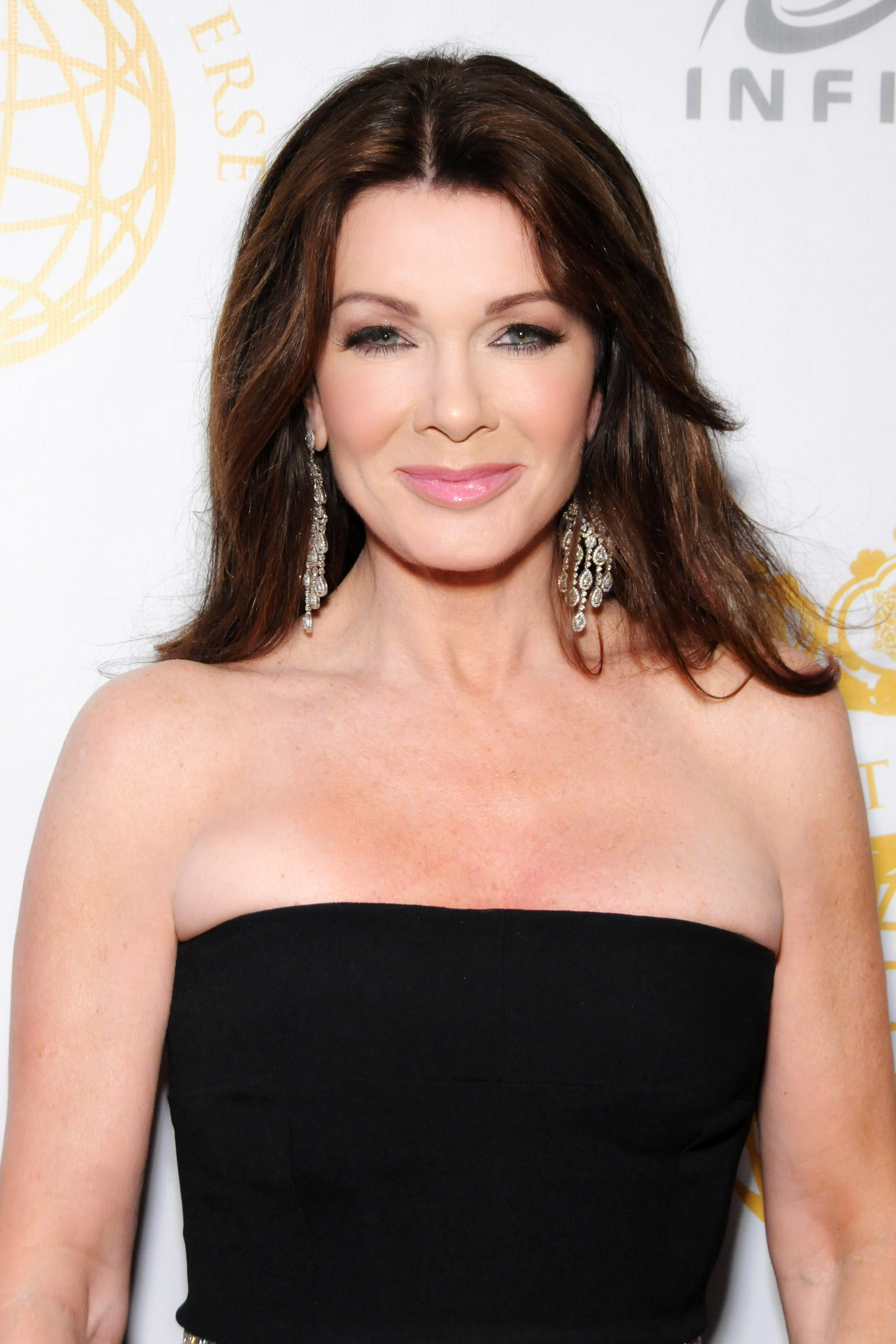
Lisa Vanderpump appears in the music video for "G.U.Y." as Gaga's accomplice.

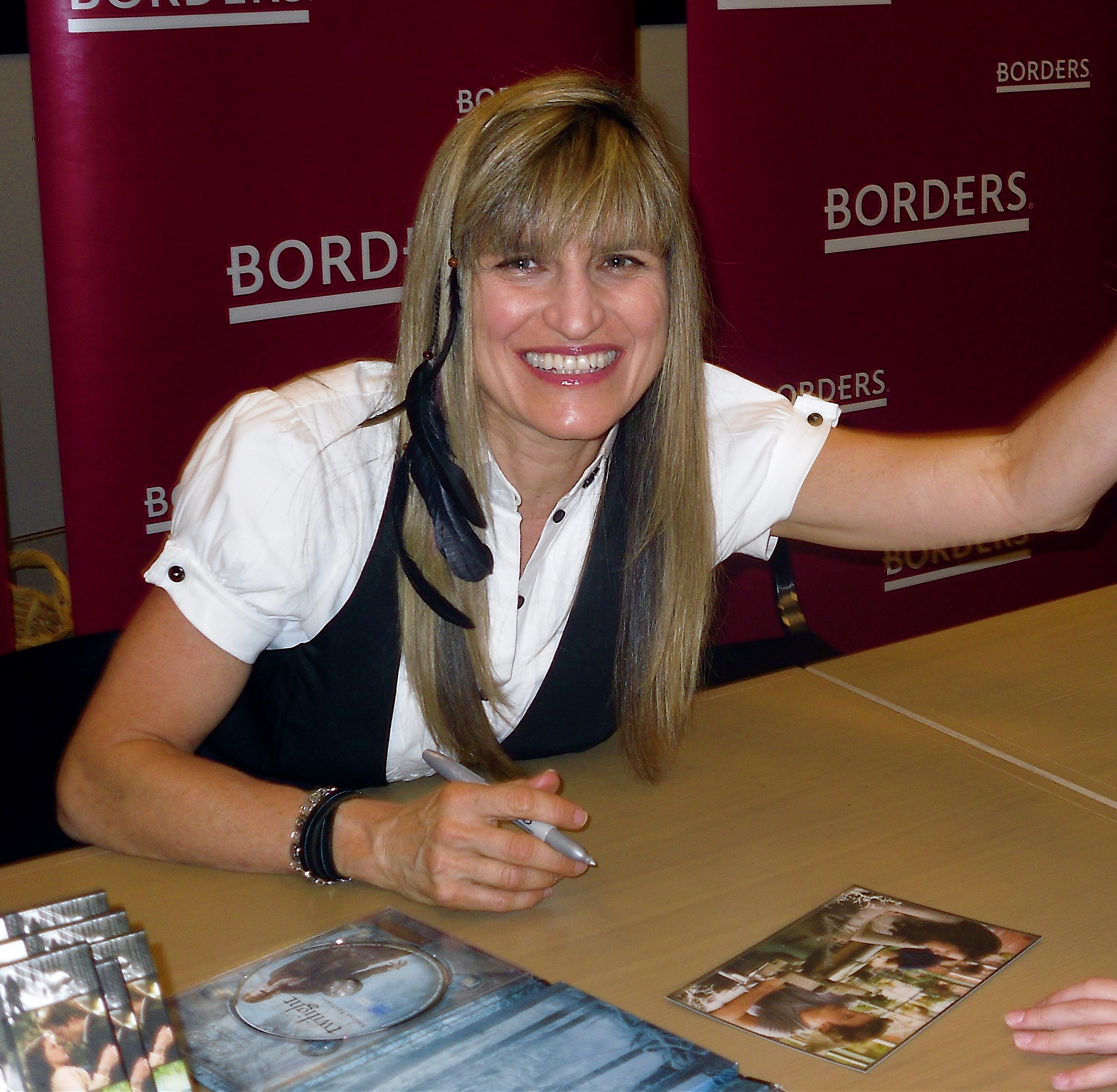
Twilight's (2008) film director Catherine Hardwicke, directed the music video for "Til It Happens to You".

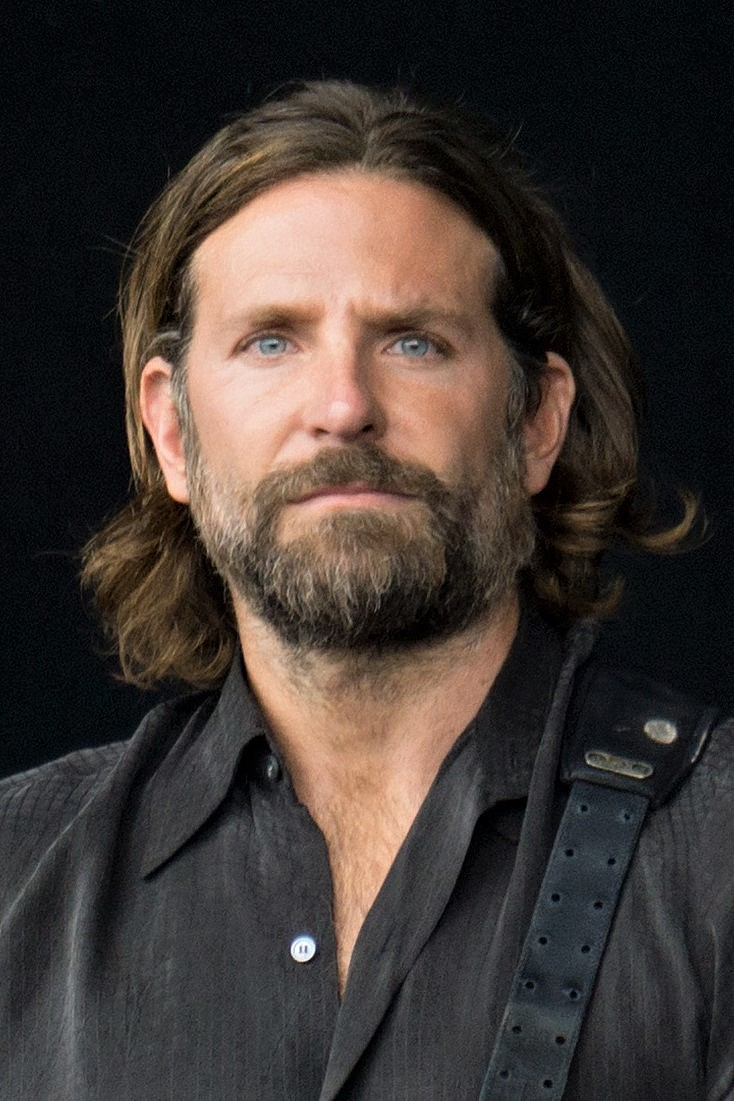
Bradley Cooper appears in many music videos from A Star Is Born (2018).

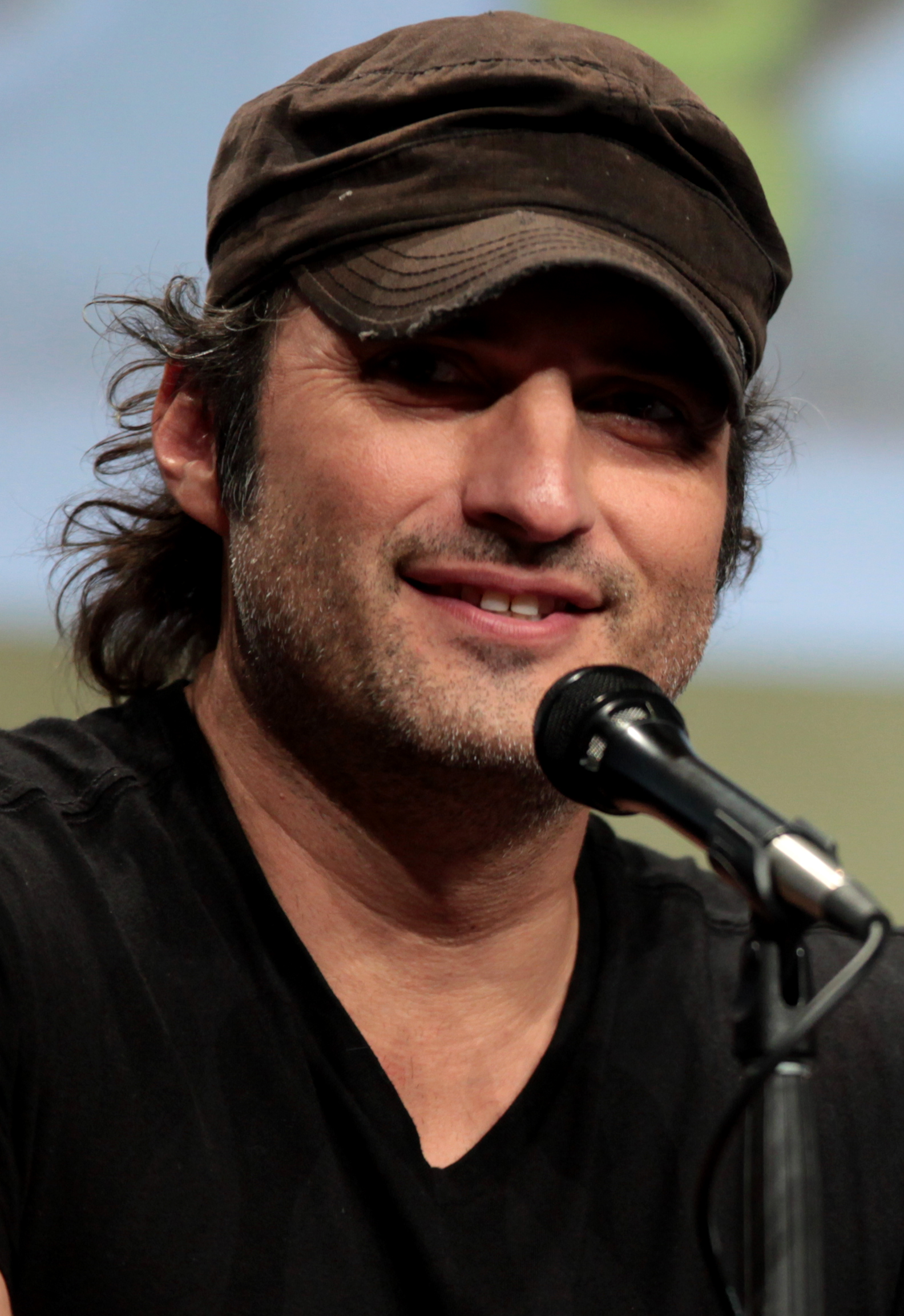
Robert Rodriguez, who had previously worked with Gaga on the films Machete Kills (2013) and Sin City: A Dame to Kill For (2014), directed the music video for "Rain on Me".

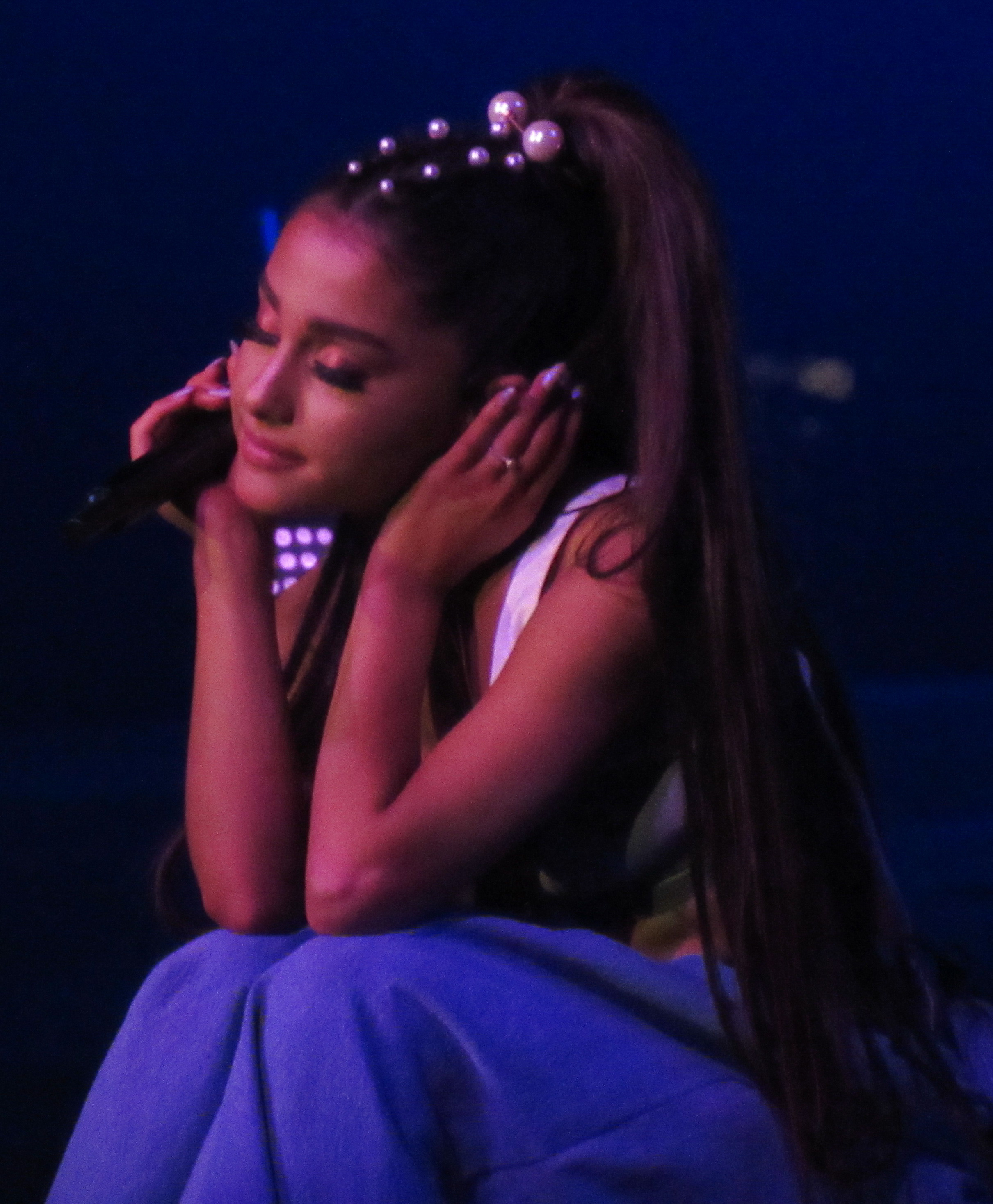
Ariana Grande features in the "Rain on Me" video.

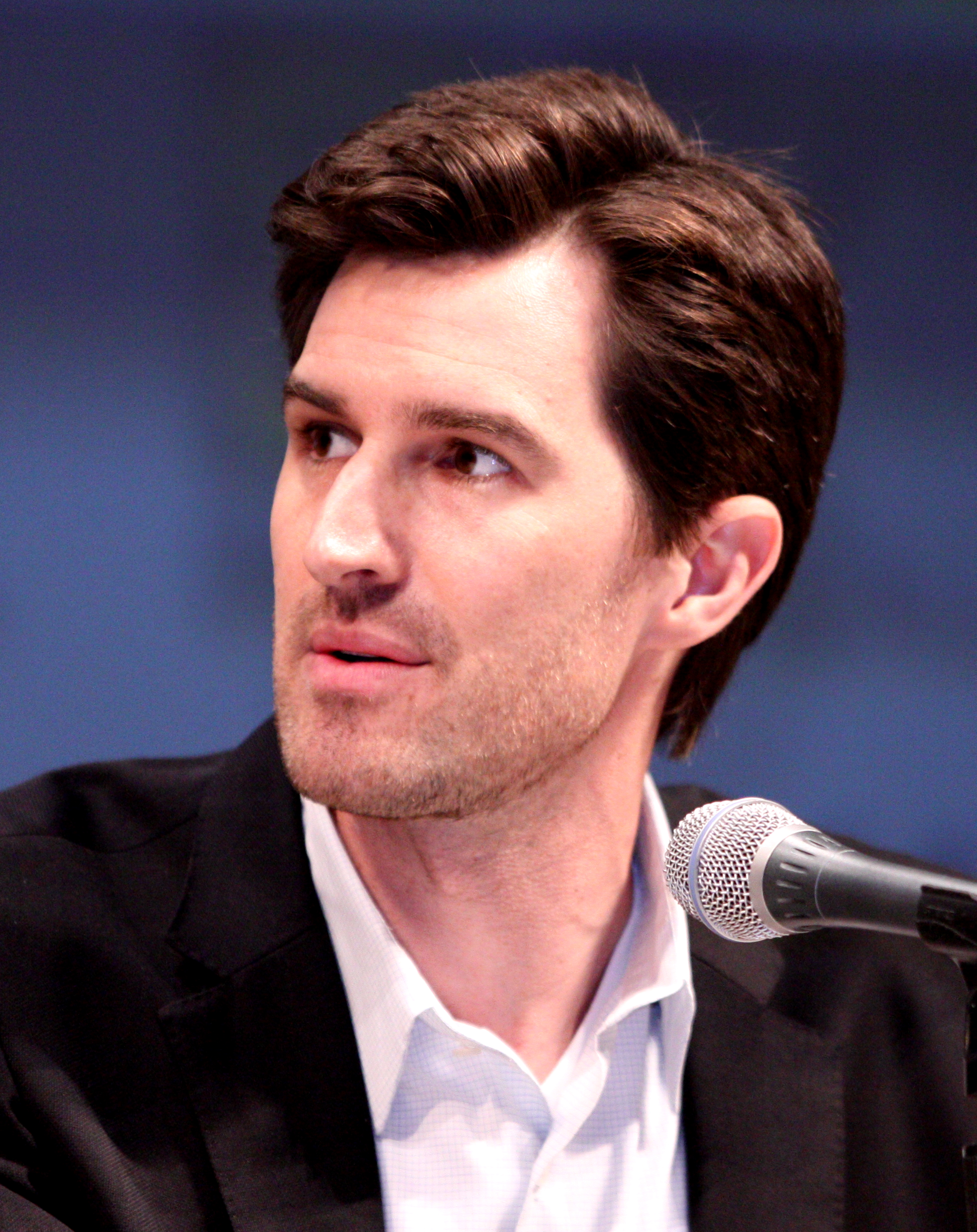
Joseph Kosinski directed the music video for "Hold My Hand".

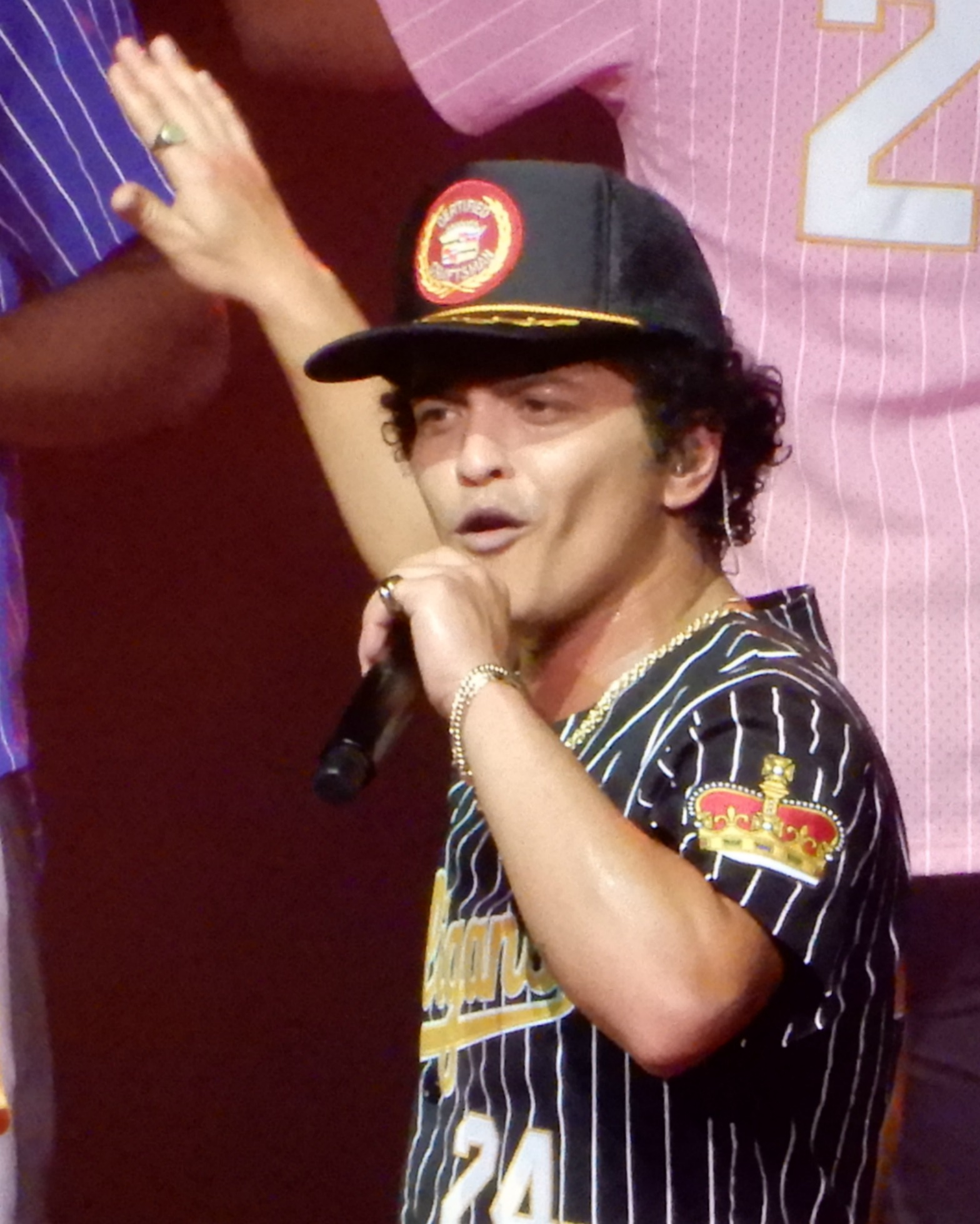
Bruno Mars features in the "Die with a Smile" music video.

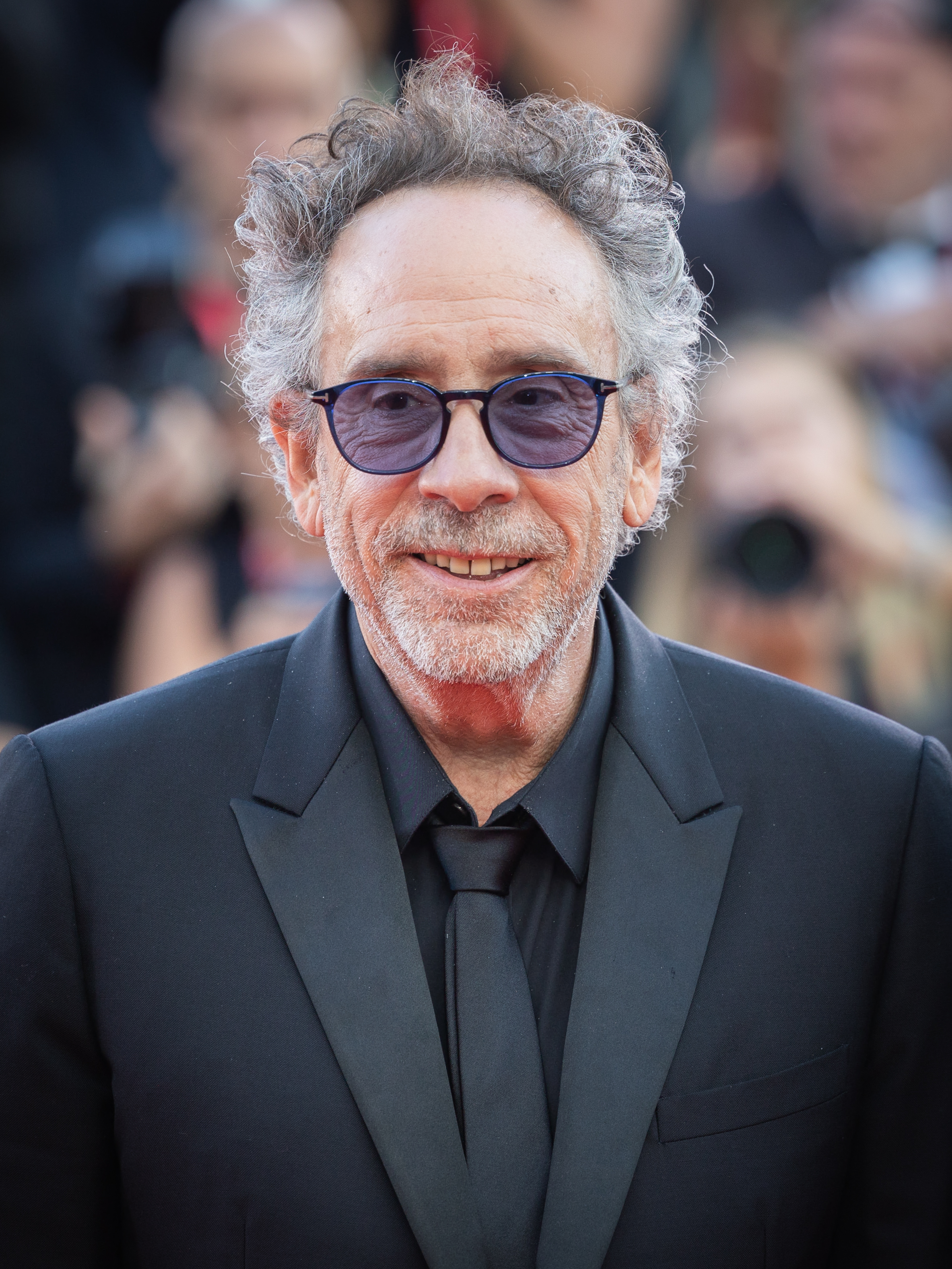
Tim Burton directed the music video for "The Dead Dance".

List of music videos, with the directors and descriptions
Title	Year	Other performer(s) credited	Director(s)	Description	Ref.
"Just Dance"	2008	Colby O'Donis	Melina Matsoukas	The video begins with Gaga and her dancers arriving at an already ended house party, and starts playing the song prompting the asleep party-goers to wake up and start dancing to the music. The video features Gaga in her early fashion and incorporation of David Bowie's Ziggy Stardust character, her primary inspiration. Akon and Space Cowboy make cameos.	
"Beautiful, Dirty, Rich"	2008	None	Melina Matsoukas	Shot in a mansion, the music video has two versions, one intercut with clips from the ABC channel's TV series Dirty Sexy Money and the other without them. Gaga and her dancers walk and dance through various parts of the building, while also burning money. Matsoukas employed heavy use of frontal lighting and low camera angles.	
"Poker Face"	2008	None	Ray Kay	Filmed in a luxury villa sponsored by Bwin, the music video portrays Gaga's fashion adopted for The Fame (2008) era and her ideas behind pop culture. It shows Gaga coming out of a pool in a mirror masquerade mask and a black full-body leotard. She then attends a party and plays strip poker. The imagery used in "Poker Face" shows futuristic science-fiction stylings and Gaga provoking the men to strip at the poker game rather than herself.	
"Don't Give Up"	2009	Nathan Ferraro	Unknown	The video is a remake of the original version by Peter Gabriel and Kate Bush, and features Gaga and Ferraro singing the song, all the while remaining in an embrace with each other.	
"Eh, Eh (Nothing Else I Can Say)"	2009	None	Joseph Kahn	The Italian-American 1950s-inspired music video was shot back-to-back with the video for "LoveGame" at Little Italy. A contrast from her earlier releases, "Eh, Eh" finds Gaga and her friends roaming around the streets of an Italian neighborhood; Gaga riding a Vespa and also singing the song while at home with her boyfriend. The visuals portray stereotypical male personas like mustached chefs and macho men in wife beaters.	
"LoveGame"	2009	None	Joseph Kahn	Inspired by the New York underground, the music video portrays Gaga dancing at an underground subway station and in a parking lot. It is a tribute from the singer to the New York lifestyle, including its glamour, fans and fashion. The video takes several influences from Michael Jackson's "Bad" music video, which also took place in a subway station.	
"Chillin"	2009	Wale	Chris Robinson	The music video features Wale and Gaga at the District of Columbia's Cardozo Senior High School and Wale in various venues and streets in the District. In the United States, the video was added to BET's TV rotation.	
"Paparazzi"	2009	None	Jonas Åkerlund	The music video portrays Gaga as a doomed starlet, who is followed by photographers everywhere. She is almost killed by her boyfriend, but survives and poisons him to revenge herself. It finishes with Gaga being arrested. Gaga's inspirations for the video ranged from classic films and fashion photography, while the visuals portray dead models, newspaper reports for the plot, as well as a number of encoded meanings.	
"Bad Romance"	2009	None	Francis Lawrence	The video features Gaga inside a surreal white bathhouse. There, she gets kidnapped by a group of supermodels who drug her and sell her to the Russian mafia for sexual slavery. The music video ends with Gaga killing the man who bought her by setting him on fire.	
"Video Phone"	2009	Beyoncé	Hype Williams	The video portrays Gaga and Beyoncé in a number of costumes, brandishing colorful guns towards men and paying homage to the film Reservoir Dogs (1992) and pin-up model Bettie Page. It won a BET Award for Video of the Year and various nominations at the 2010 MTV Video Music Awards.	
"Telephone"	2010	Beyoncé	Jonas Åkerlund	The music video is a continuation of the plot from the "Paparazzi" video and was shot as a short film. After Gaga gets bailed out of prison by Beyoncé, they go to a diner to get revenge on Beyoncé's boyfriend, but accidentally end up killing all the patrons having breakfast. Upon escape from the crime scene, the two end up in a high-speed police chase. The video referenced Quentin Tarantino's films Kill Bill: Volume 1 (2003) and Pulp Fiction (1994).	
"Alejandro"	2010	None	Steven Klein	Inspired by Gaga's love for the gay community, the video showed the singer dancing with a group of soldiers in a cabaret, interspersed with scenes of Gaga as a nun swallowing a rosary and near-naked men holding machine guns. Critics complimented its idea and dark nature while the Catholic League criticized Gaga for blasphemy.	
"Born This Way"	2011	None	Nick Knight	Inspired by painters like Salvador Dalí and Francis Bacon and their surrealistic images, Gaga is depicted as giving birth to a new human race free of prejudice during the video's prologue. The scenes alternate between various dance sequences and Gaga singing on a throne in space.	
"Judas" •	2011	None	Lady Gaga; Laurieann Gibson	Co-starring Norman Reedus, the video has a Biblical storyline where Reedus plays Judas Iscariot and Gaga plays Mary Magdalene. The video portrays them as modern day missionaries, representing the Twelve Apostles going with Jesus to Jerusalem. It includes the Biblical story of Judas betraying Jesus, and ends with Gaga as Mary Magdalene getting stoned to death.	
"The Edge of Glory"	2011	None	Haus of Gaga	A simple video in contrast to much of Gaga's previous work, it portrays her dancing on an apartment building's fire escape and walking on a lonely street in New York City. Differences to Gaga's previous videos include the lack of intricate choreography and back-up dancers, as well as using only one outfit, which was designed by Versace. Aside from Gaga herself, Clarence Clemons is the only other person to appear in the video.	
"3-Way (The Golden Rule)"	2011	The Lonely Island; Justin Timberlake	Akiva Schaffer; Jorma Taccone	The video features shots of Timberlake and Andy Samberg singing around town. Timberlake tells his plan to have a sexual encounter with a girl he met, while Samberg reveals a similar plan. They both meet outside of Gaga's apartment, where it is revealed that both of them met the same girl, without each other knowing. Gaga explains that she invited them both so that they could have a threesome, which they agree to do because of "the golden rule". The music video aired as part of the SNL Digital Short series.	
"You and I"	2011	None	Laurieann Gibson	Shot in Springfield, Nebraska, the video features Jo Calderone, Gaga's male alter ego, and Yüyi, her mermaid alter ego. The main concept behind the video is Gaga's journey to be with her beloved one, a mad scientist, portrayed by Taylor Kinney.	
"The Lady Is a Tramp"	2011	Tony Bennett	Unjoo Moon	The video shows Bennett and Gaga singing together in a studio in front of music stands.	
"Marry the Night" •	2011	None	Lady Gaga	Filmed in New York City, it tells the story of Gaga getting signed by her record label Interscope Records after being dropped from her former label, Def Jam Recordings. Alternates between scenes in a clinic, a dance studio, her own New York apartment and on a car's rooftop at a parking lot.	
"Applause"	2013	None	Inez and Vinoodh	The video draws inspiration from the arts, including Sandro Botticelli's Birth of Venus, Andy Warhol's depiction of Marilyn Monroe and John Galliano's fall 2009 fashion show. Alternating between color and black-and-white, it shows artistic and complex scenes such as Gaga's head on a swan, a scene in a bird cage, and the singer seated in a large top hat. Gaga also wears hand-shaped lingerie and a seashell bra with matching shell bikini. Near the climax, the singer features in a violet, crystal-like scene, and at the end, the name of her album Artpop (2013) is spelled using hand gestures.	
"G.U.Y. – An Artpop Film" •	2014	None	Lady Gaga	The music video was shot at Hearst Castle, near San Simeon, California. The video featured reality television show actors like The Real Housewives of Beverly Hills, and art works of artist Nathan Sawaya and YouTube's Minecraft entertainer SkyDoesMinecraft. Running for over eleven minutes, the video shows Gaga as a fallen and wounded angel, who is revived by her followers in a pool. Once rejuvenated, she takes revenge on the men who hunted her and replaces them with clones known as G.U.Y.	
"Anything Goes"	2014	Tony Bennett	Nicole Ehrlich; Harvey White	A studio video featuring Gaga and Bennett recording songs for Cheek to Cheek (2014).	
"I Can't Give You Anything but Love"	2014	Tony Bennett	Nicole Ehrlich; Harvey White	A studio video featuring Gaga and Bennett recording songs for Cheek to Cheek (2014).	
"But Beautiful"	2014	Tony Bennett	Nicole Ehrlich; Harvey White	A studio video featuring Gaga and Bennett recording songs for Cheek to Cheek (2014).	
"It Don't Mean a Thing (If It Ain't Got That Swing)"	2014	Tony Bennett	Nicole Ehrlich; Harvey White	A studio video featuring Gaga and Bennett recording songs for Cheek to Cheek (2014).	
"Til It Happens to You"	2015	None	Catherine Hardwicke	Shot in black-and-white for the 2015 documentary film The Hunting Ground, and part of a public service announcement video, it depicts various instances of violence against women, as well as sexual assaults. It ends with a cautionary note on their effects, and the victims finding solace with their close friends and relatives. Gaga is not featured in the video.	
"Perfect Illusion"	2016	None	Ruth Hogben; Andrea Gelardin	Gaga is seen performing in a crowd in the desert, including the song's producers Kevin Parker, Mark Ronson, and BloodPop.	
"Million Reasons"	2016	None	Ruth Hogben; Andrea Gelardin	A continuation from the music video for "Perfect Illusion", it shows Gaga being picked up from the desert by her friends and workmates. Afterwards, she goes into a studio to film a music video for the song.	
"John Wayne"	2017	None	Jonas Åkerlund	A continuation from the music video for "Million Reasons", it features Gaga riding a horse and getting involved in a dangerous motorcycle chase. The video intercuts with scenes of Gaga dancing under neon lights and gun shoots.	
"Joanne (Where Do You Think You're Goin'?)"	2018	None	Ruth Hogben; Andrea Gelardin; Haus of Gaga	The video depicts Gaga playing instruments and walking outdoors in a backyard, along with images of her at a bar with friends. The clip is a mixture of black and white and colored scenes.	
"Shallow"	2018	Bradley Cooper	Bradley Cooper	The video is composed of various clips from Gaga's film A Star Is Born (2018). Gaga's character, Ally, and Jackson Maine, played by Bradley Cooper, perform the song for the first time at a sold-out venue.	
"Look What I Found"	2018	None	Bradley Cooper	The video is composed of various clips from A Star Is Born (2018). Gaga's character, Ally, records "Look What I Found" in a recording studio.	
"I'll Never Love Again"	2018	None	Bradley Cooper	The video is composed of various clips from A Star Is Born (2018). Features Gaga's character singing a tribute to her late husband Jackson (played by Bradley Cooper).	
"Always Remember Us This Way"	2018	None	Bradley Cooper	The video is composed of various clips from A Star Is Born (2018). Features Gaga's character going onstage to sing the song, introduced by Bradley Cooper's character Jackson. A vertical video was also released to Spotify.	
"Stupid Love"	2020	None	Daniel Askill	The main concept of the video is bringing different kinds of people together under music and dance. It is represented with separate groups of dancers, each forming a unique tribe with a corresponding color and logo.	
"Rain on Me"	2020	Ariana Grande	Robert Rodriguez	The video continues the story of Chromatica (2020) and the dual mirror worlds with which Gaga and Grande's characters exist. It ends with a shot of the two singers hugging each other.	
"911"	2020	None	Tarsem Singh	Heavily inspired by Sergei Parajanov's The Color of Pomegranates (1969), the video reveals to be an elaborate hallucination, as Gaga suddenly snaps back into reality in an ambulance after being involved in a serious car accident. It also features "Chromatica II" and "Chromatica III".	
"I Get a Kick Out of You"	2021	Tony Bennett	Jennifer Lebeau	A studio video featuring Gaga and Bennett recording the song.	
"Love for Sale"	2021	Tony Bennett	Jennifer Lebeau	A studio video featuring Gaga and Bennett recording the song.	
"I've Got You Under My Skin"	2021	Tony Bennett	Jennifer Lebeau	A studio video featuring Gaga and Bennett recording the song.	
"I Concentrate on You"	2021	Tony Bennett	Jennifer Lebeau	The video shows the sketch session which resulted in Bennett's drawing appearing on the album cover of Love for Sale's (2021) standard edition.	
"Dream Dancing"	2021	Tony Bennett	Jennifer Lebeau	A studio video featuring Gaga and Bennett recording the song.	
"Night and Day"	2021	Tony Bennett	Jennifer Lebeau	A studio video featuring Gaga and Bennett recording the song.	
"Hold My Hand"	2022	None	Joseph Kosinski	Directed by Top Gun: Maverick's (2022) director, Joseph Kosinski, it shows Gaga singing under a jet, while playing a piano on a plane runway. The video is spliced with scenes of the film as well. It ends with Gaga belting the lyrics as jets take off.	
"Die with a Smile"	2024	Bruno Mars	Daniel Ramos; Bruno Mars	It shows the duo performing the song on a retro stage of a television studio set, populated by faceless mannequins, as a black-and-white camera records them.	
"Disease"	2024	None	Tanu Muino	It shows two Gagas being pitted against each other in the presence of a mysterious, gimp-suited figure eventually revealed to be Gaga herself.	
"Abracadabra" •	2025	None	Lady Gaga; Parris Goebel; Bethany Vargas	The music video opens with Gaga, standing on the upper level of a grand venue, dressed in a spiked red latex outfit. She declares, "The category is dance or die," setting off an intense choreography sequence featuring a crowd of forty dancers, all dressed in white.	
"The Dead Dance"	2025	None	Tim Burton	The music video takes place in a graveyard and begins with Gaga perched motionless on a wall surrounded by dozens of dolls, which gradually come to life as she starts to dance. The visual opens in black and white but introduces color as it progresses.	
"Runway"	2026	Doechii	Parris Goebel	The music video is set against a high-fashion backdrop and takes place in a stylized setting with bold lighting and theatrical staging, where a group of dancers posed in sculptural outfits perform synchronized choreography.	

=== Guest appearances ===
List of music videos, with the directors and descriptions
Title	Year	Performer(s)	Director(s)	Description	Ref.
"Stiff Upper Lip"	2000	AC/DC	Andy Morahan	Lady Gaga made a debut as an extra in music video for AC/DC in New York City. Gaga can be seen dancing and shaking her head.	
"Magnetic Baby"	2007	Semi Precious Weapons	Pamela Romanowsky	Original version of "Magnetic Baby". The video shows Gaga as a brunette pouring alcohol on a member of the band, and then kissing him and dancing.	
"Fat Juicy & Wet"	2025	Bruno Mars; Sexyy Red	Bruno Mars; Daniel Ramos	It shows Gaga popping champagne and dancing with Mars, Red and Rosé.	

== Video albums ==
List of video albums with descriptions
Title	Album details	Description
The Fame Monster: Video EP	Released: May 7, 2010; Label: Streamline, Interscope, Cherrytree, KonLive; Format: Download	Contains the music videos for Gaga's first seven singles as lead artist.
Lady Gaga Presents the Monster Ball Tour: At Madison Square Garden	Released: November 21, 2011; Label: Streamline, Interscope, Kon Live; Formats: DVD, Blu-ray, download	Contains the concert special as it originally aired on HBO in May 2011 along with new content.
Tony Bennett and Lady Gaga: Cheek to Cheek Live!	Released: January 20, 2015; Label: Streamline, Interscope, Columbia; Formats: DVD, Blu-ray, download	Contains the concert television special featuring live performances by Tony Bennett and Lady Gaga, originally filmed on July 28, 2014, and aired on PBS on October 24, 2014.
Apple Music Live: Mayhem Requiem	Released: May 16, 2026; Label: Interscope; Formats: Download	Contains the one-night-only concert performance of the standard edition of Mayhem. Produced in collaboration with Apple Music.

== Filmography ==
=== Film ===
List of films and roles
Title	Year	Role	Notes	Ref.
Machete Kills	2013	La Chameleón	Supporting role	
Muppets Most Wanted	2014	Herself	Cameo appearance	
Sin City: A Dame to Kill For	2014	Bertha	Supporting role	
Gaga: Five Foot Two	2017	Herself	Documentary film; also producer	
A Star Is Born	2018	Ally Maine	Lead role	
House of Gucci	2021	Patrizia Reggiani	Lead role	
Joker: Folie à Deux	2024	Harleen "Lee" Quinzel	Lead role	
The Lady and The Legend	2026	Herself	Documentary film	
The Devil Wears Prada 2	2026	Herself	Cameo appearance	

=== Television ===
List of television appearances and roles
Title	Year	Role	Notes	Ref.
The Sopranos	2001	Classmate	Episode: "The Telltale Moozadell"; Uncredited	
Boiling Points	2005	Herself	Uncredited	
The Hills	2008	Herself	Episode: "Something Has to Change"	
Gossip Girl	2009	Herself	Episode: "The Last Days of Disco Stick"; Cameo appearance	
Saturday Night Live	2009	Musical Guest	Episode: "Ryan Reynolds / Lady Gaga"	
Double Exposure	2010	Herself	Episode: "No One Can Work Like This"	
Lady Gaga Presents the Monster Ball Tour: At Madison Square Garden	2011	Herself	Television special	
American Idol	2011	Mentor	Season 10	
Saturday Night Live	2011	Musical Guest	Episode: "Justin Timberlake / Lady Gaga"	
Lady Gaga: Inside the Outside	2011	Herself	Television documentary	
So You Think You Can Dance	2011	Guest Judge	Season 8, episode 3	
A Very Gaga Thanksgiving	2011	Herself	Television special; also director	
Dick Clark's New Year's Rockin' Eve	2011	Herself	Television special	
The Simpsons	2012	Herself (voice)	Episode: "Lisa Goes Gaga"	
Opening Act	2012	Herself	Episode: "Von & Lady Gaga"	
Who the F–k is Arthur Fogel?	2013	Herself	Documentary	
Saturday Night Live	2013	Host / Musical Guest	Episode: "Lady Gaga"	
Lady Gaga and the Muppets Holiday Spectacular	2013	Herself	Television special	
Tony Bennett and Lady Gaga: Cheek to Cheek Live!	2014	Herself	Television special	
American Horror Story: Hotel	2015–2016	Elizabeth Johnson / The Countess (Note: Gaga plays a single character who has two different names. For her performance in the role, she won a Golden Globe Award for Best Actress – Miniseries or Television Film.)	Season 5 of American Horror Story	
Variety Studio: Actors on Actors	2016; 2019; 2022	Herself	Season 4 (with Jamie Lee Curtis); Season 9 (with Lin-Manuel Miranda); Season 15 (with Jake Gyllenhaal)	
American Horror Story: Roanoke	2016	Scáthach	Season 6 of American Horror Story	
Saturday Night Live	2016	Musical Guest	Episode: "Tom Hanks / Lady Gaga"	
The Late Late Show with James Corden	2016	Herself	Carpool Karaoke	
Tony Bennett Celebrates 90: The Best Is Yet to Come	2016	Herself	Television special	
Super Bowl LI halftime show	2017	Herself / Headliner	Super Bowl LI	
RuPaul's Drag Race	2017	Herself / Guest Judge	Episode: "Oh My Gaga"	
The Defiant Ones	2017	Herself	Television documentary	
One World: Together at Home	2020	Herself	Television special	
The Me You Can't See	2021	Herself	Episode: "Say It Out Loud"	
Friends: The Reunion	2021	Herself	Television special	
One Last Time: An Evening with Tony Bennett and Lady Gaga	2021	Herself	Television special	
MTV Unplugged Presents: Tony Bennett & Lady Gaga	2021	Herself	Television special	
Gaga Chromatica Ball	2024	Herself	Television special; also director	
Saturday Night Live	2025	Host / Musical Guest	Episode: "Lady Gaga"	
Wednesday	2025	Rosaline Rotwood	Episode: "Woe Thyself"	
Super Bowl LX halftime show	2026	Herself / Guest	Super Bowl LX	

Key
†	Denotes films that have not yet been released

== Commercials ==
List of commercials, with the directors, featured songs, and descriptions
Company and product	Year	Director(s)	Featured song(s)	Description	Ref.
F1 Rocks	2009	Unknown	"Just Dance" "LoveGame" "The Fame" "I Like It Rough" "Poker Face"	In the video, Gaga is promoting Singapore as a tourist destination for F1 Rocks.	
RTL II	2009	Matthew Williams	"LoveGame"	Titled "It's fun", the video shows Gaga dancing and doing various poses.	
RTL II	2011	Stephanie Wimmer	"The Edge of Glory"	A series of television commercials for RTL, a German commercial television station, inspired by films, such as Metropolis (1927), 2046 (2004) and Sin City (2005), and feature Gaga interacting with their new 3D logo.	
MAC Cosmetics	2011	Nick Knight	None	In the abstract film with tons of ghostly imagery, she is completely silent and can be seen putting on the Viva Glam Lipstick.	
Google Chrome	2011	Laurieann Gibson	"The Edge of Glory"	The commercial premiered during her appearance on Saturday Night Live, featuring Gaga running over the Brooklyn Bridge, rehearsing her dancing, and interacting with her fans over the internet.	
MTV Video Music Awards	2011	Unknown	"Government Hooker" "Heavy Metal Lover"	The video features Gaga drinking and dancing with her crew. Semi Precious Weapons, The Dirty Pearls, Lady Starlight and Darian Darling make cameo.	
Fame	2012	Steven Klein	"Scheiße"	The video features Gaga scratching off black ooze, representing her black eau de parfum, from the male model's face. At the end of the commercial, Lady Gaga's "Gulliver pose" is transformed into a golden statue similar to the cap of the bottle.	
O_{2} Tracks	2013	David Wilson	"Do What U Want"	Used to promote O_{2}'s app music, which customers would listen to Artpop (2013) six days earlier its official release date. It features Gaga in many shots in a big blue balloon room.	
The O_{2} Arena	2014	David Wilson	"Applause"	Used to promote the European leg of ArtRave: The Artpop Ball, it begins with a giant silver balloon explodes from which Gaga emerges. Then she starts walking to the front of the arena while the music and cheers get louder.	
Eau de Gaga	2014	Steven Klein	"I Can't Give You Anything but Love"	The commercial features her atop a pile of shirtless male models, rolling around them.	
H&M	2014	Johan Renck	"It Don't Mean a Thing"	Titled "Magical Holidays", Gaga and Tony Bennett appear as hosts of beautiful models, who enjoy a glamorous 1940's style bash.	
Shiseido	2015	Ellen von Unwerth	"Cheek to Cheek"	Multiple clips of Gaga at her own New York City apartment with her dog. Some scenes feature Gaga with some friends in a party.	
Tom Ford	2015	Nick Knight	"I Want Your Love"	A fashion film for Tom Ford's 2016 spring campaign, which depicts Gaga among several models dancing around a catwalk.	
Barnes & Noble	2015	Jonas Åkerlund	"Baby, It's Cold Outside"	Gaga and Tony Bennett feature in the bookstore chain's holiday television ad, where they walk the aisles of a Barnes & Noble store while looking for a gift for each other.	
Intel	2016	Ruth Hogben	None	In a long, brightly lit hallway stands Gaga who speaks about creating something different with Intel, which would be revealed at the 58th Annual Grammy Awards.	
Tiffany & Co.	2017	Grace Coddington	None	In the video, she talks about growing up in New York and what it means to be creative. It was officially aired before Gaga's performance at the halftime show on Super Bowl 51.	
Revlon	2017	Brett Ratner	"Million Reasons"	Titled "The Love Project", Gaga, Pharrell Williams and Ellen DeGeneres share what love means to them. The campaign was intended to raise money for charities, such as the Born This Way Foundation, From One Hand to Another and The Trevor Project.	
Staples Inc.	2017	Unknown	"Born This Way"	In partnership with DonorsChoose.org and Born This Way Foundation, Gaga plays a substitute teacher and asks students what they want to be in the future in the video.	
Montres Tudor SA	2017	Mark Romanek	"Rondo Alla Turca"	Titled "Born to Dare", Gaga takes on two roles as she battles herself on dueling pianos with her own dark alter-ego.	
Haus Laboratories	2019	Daniel Sannwald	"Babylon" (Haus Labs version)	Serving as the launch video, Gaga encourages the embrace of individuality and expressing it through bold makeup and body art with her collection of makeup. The campaign is titled "Our Haus. Your Rules".	
Haus Laboratories	2019	Unknown	Unknown	In the video, Gaga is along with other models sporting the new range, promoting the part 1 of the Cosmic Love Holiday Collection.	
Apple Inc.	2020	Daniel Askill	"Stupid Love"	Titled "Shot on iPhone 11 Pro", it features 1 minute of Stupid Love's music video.	
Haus Laboratories	2020	Unknown	Unknown	The commercial features Gaga doing various poses, alternating with multiple clips of the brand's new gel pencil eyeliner, named Eye-Dentify.	
Valentino	2020	Harmony Korine	"Sine from Above" (piano version)	For the Voce Viva fragrance's campaign, titled "My Voice, My Strength", Gaga appears in a red dress in natural landscapes, with the images being interspersed with people of various ethnicities doing the performances, representing the world union.	
Dom Pérignon	2021	Nick Knight	"Free Woman"	Titled "The Queendom", it shows Gaga holding a giant champagne bottle, making moves while blending with the background in swirling patterns of movement, before joining a group of others for a toast.	

== Web ==
List of web appearances and roles
Title	Year	Role	Notes	Ref.
Gagavision	2008–2020 (Note: Web series overview: Episodes 1–27 were released in 2008; Episodes 28–40 were released in 2009; Episodes 41–44 were released in 2011; Episodes 45–46 were released in 2014; Episodes 47–49 were released in 2020.)	Herself	Web series	
Monstervision	2012	Herself	Web series	
ArtRave	2013	Herself	Live-streamed promotional event	
Lady Gaga Live at Roseland Ballroom	2014	Herself	Live-streamed concert residency	
Dive Bar Tour	2016	Herself	Live-streamed promotional concert tour	
RuPaul's Drag Race: Untucked	2017	Herself / Guest judge	1 episode, companion show to RuPaul's Drag Race	
Dear Class of 2020	2020	Herself	Virtual event	
Paper x Club Quarantine Presents: Lady Gaga's Chromatica Fundrager	2020	Herself	Zoom party	
Beloved Community Talks – The Power of Unlearning	2021	Herself	Virtual event	
The Power of Kindness	2021	Herself	Virtual event	
