= Dairy Farm Nature Park =

Public park in Singapore

Coordinates: 1.3638°N 103.7736°E

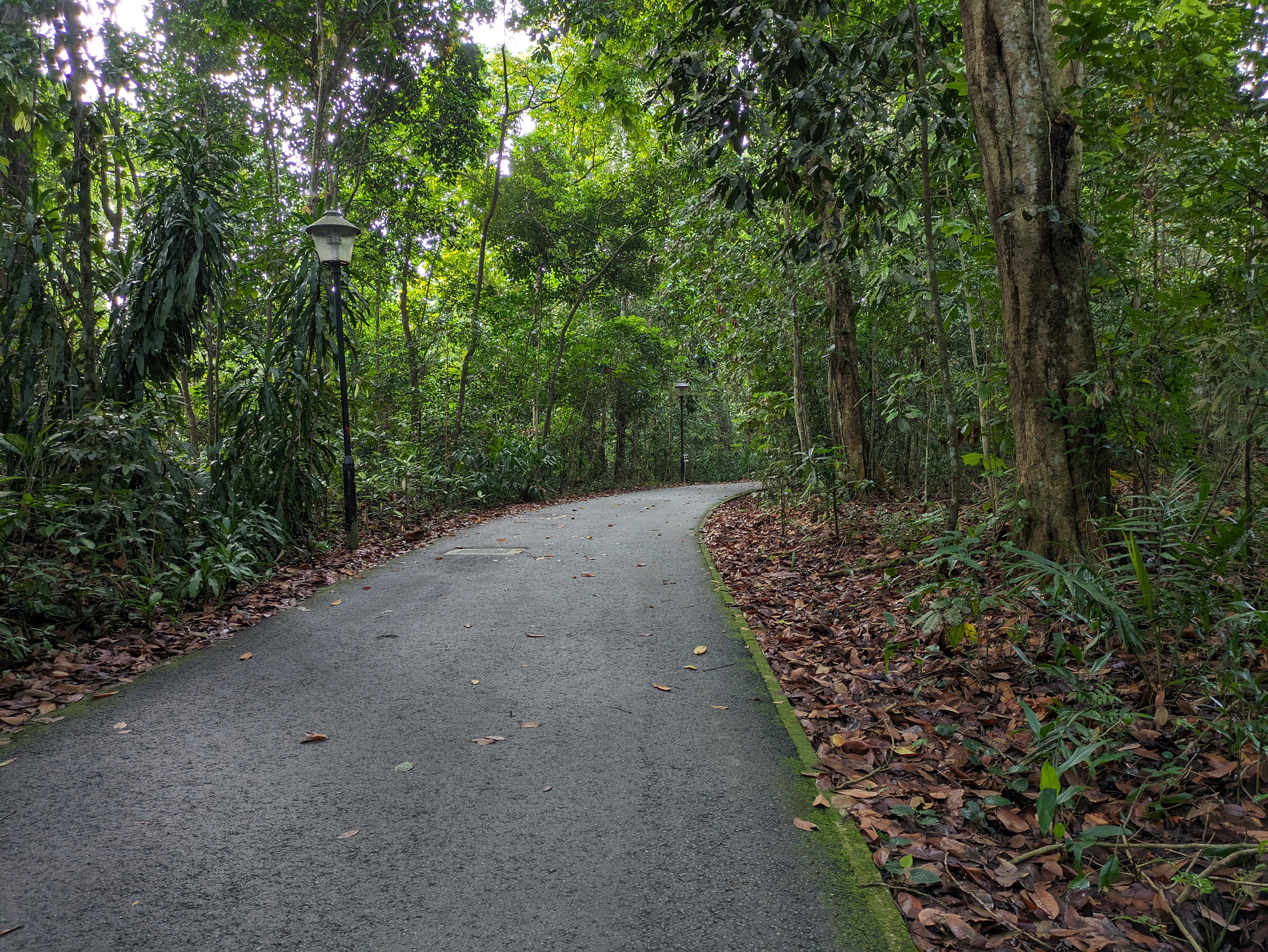
- Wallace Trail

- Location within Singapore
- Type: Nature park
- Location: Singapore
- Area: 63 hectares (630,000 m^{2})
- Opened: 2009
Dairy Farm Nature Park
- Subzone of Bukit Panjang Planning Area
Name transcription(s)
- Interactive map of Dairy Farm Nature Park
- Country: Singapore

Dairy Farm Nature Park is a 63-hectare public nature park located at 100 Dairy Farm Road in Upper Bukit Timah, on the west side of Singapore. The park opened in 2009 and is a popular recreational area with a variety of attractions for visitors centered around two quarries. Singapore Quarry offers a scenic lake view and wildlife, while Dairy Farm Quarry offers an experience of the region's geological history surrounded by lush greenery and rock cliffs.

Dairy Farm Nature Park is open from 7:00 AM to 7:00 PM daily. The park offers facilities such as restrooms, parking areas, and shelter huts for guests to utilize during their visit. Popular recreational activities at the park include hiking and mountain biking.

== History ==
The present site of Dairy Farm Nature Park was once part of Singapore's lush woodlands, which were cut down for pepper and gambier plantations in the 1800s. Originally, in 1929, this land was utilized for pig raising. However, it later evolved into a dairy farm founded by Cold Storage in 1930, which became renowned as the world's first tropical dairy farm. This operation was conducted by Fred Heron, then-Managing Director of Cold Storage. Heron established the 60-acre site as a dairy farm due to the shortage of fresh milk available at that time. There was demand for high-quality pasteurized milk for children of expatriates living in Singapore. The dairy farm was the only successful farm that reared Friesian cows in Singapore, which was attractive to foreign scientists and farming experts. The farm operated until the 1980s, when the National Parks Board began devoting time and resources to renovating and upgrading the land. Dairy Farm Nature Park officially opened to the public in 2009.

== Education ==
Dairy Farm Nature Park is home to the Wallace Education Centre, dedicated to Alfred Russel Wallace, the renowned British naturalist who conducted observations in the area that is now the park during his explorations in the 19th century. In 1854, Wallace stayed for several weeks at the foothills of Bukit Timah Hill, where he spent time collecting and observing the local flora and fauna. To get closer to the remaining primary forests, he stayed with a French Roman Catholic missionary at St. Joseph's in the Bukit Timah district. Wallace collected over 700 species of beetles both at Dairy Farm and in the wider Bukit Timah area. Minister Desmond Lee expressed appreciation for Wallace's contributions during his speech at the reopening of the Wallace Education Centre in 2020. He highlighted that the centre serves as a permanent exhibition dedicated to showcasing Wallace's discoveries and emphasized that Wallace's works had significantly influenced Singapore's biodiversity conservation efforts. The Wallace Education Centre provides a platform for learning about the diverse species of wildlife native to the Malay Archipelago, as documented by Wallace. The Wallace Education Centre seeks to raise public understanding and appreciation of the rich natural heritage present in the park and beyond through a variety of events and interactive exhibits.

The Wallace Education Centre also provides educational institutions with an invaluable chance to plan field trips that allow students to learn about Singapore's abundant biodiversity. As per the National Parks Board, reservations for educational purposes can be made by email. The Wallace Education Centre is also open to the general public between 8:30 AM and 5:00 PM from Tuesday to Sunday, and closed on Monday.

== Wildlife ==
Visitors to the farm can expect to encounter different types of wildlife such as crimson sunbirds, peacock ferns, clouded monitor lizards, and also longhorn beetles when they are within the vicinity of the park. Several parks along the park connectors, such as Dairy Farm Nature Park, provide habitats for a wide variety of bird species, as noted by Belinda Yuen, Lily Kong, and Clive Briffett. Based on an extensive survey, their findings highlight the tremendous numbers of avian species that may be found in these places. A variety of bird species have been observed and reported on the eBird website, where birdwatchers share their findings. Among the notable sightings contributed by multiple observers are the Asian brown flycatcher (Muscicapa dauurica), greater coucal (Centropus sinensis), and red-legged crake (Rallina fasciata), along with many others. With the amount of different bird species spotted at Dairy Farm Nature Park, it is no wonder that bird lovers will frequent the park.

In 2012, researchers Zestin Wen Wen Soh and Robin Wen Jiang Ngiam conducted a study across seven different parks, including Dairy Farm Nature Park, and discovered a significant presence of flower-visiting fauna. Both Soh and Ngiam discovered species from the Hymenoptera, Lepidoptera, Diptera, Coleoptera, and Blattodea. This biodiversity is complemented by the park's distinct habitats, which sustain a variety of plant species.

In 2014, the National University of Singapore's Singapore Biodiversity Records documented the sighting of a striped tree skink (Lipinia vittigera) at Dairy Farm Nature Park. The observation took place on 12 August 2012, within the park's limits. The skink, which was observed on a tree trunk, was around 10 cm long. The lizard's vivid yellow tail is thought to serve as bait to draw in prey.

In 2019, another record published by the National University of Singapore's Singapore Biodiversity Records by Marcus F.C. Ng described a bombardier dragonfly (Lyriothemis cleis) at Dairy Farm Nature Park on 2 February. According to Ng, this species of dragonfly is considered rare and restricted in Singapore. Adding on to the list of different biodiversity observed at Dairy Farm Nature Park, another publication by the National University of Singapore, featured in its Nature in Singapore series, was released in June 2021 by authors Khoo, Soh, and Lee. During their observations at Dairy Farm Nature Park, they encountered a singular Raffles' banded langur (Presbytis femoralis), a critically endangered species which had not been seen in the wild since 1987.

Some interesting butterflies spotted include the common banded demon (Notocrypta paralysos), the Malayan eggfly (Hypolimnas anomala), the majestic common Mormon swallowtail (Papilio polytes), the common archduke (Lexias pardalis), the elbowed Pierrot (Caleta elna) and many more.

Dragonflies observed in the area include the blue marsh hawk (Orthetrum glaucum), common flashwing (Vestalis amethystina), dark-tipped forest skimmer (Cratilla metallica), and grenadier (Agrionoptera insignis). The rufous-legged grasshopper (Xenocatantops humile) and Wagler's pit viper (Tropidolaemus wagleri) have been recorded in the park.

The list of plants native to the park ranges from massive and flourishing fruit trees like the rambutan, jackfruit and mango trees to the stunning and bright-colored tiger orchid flowers, which are the largest orchid species in the world. For those who enjoy birdwatching, the crimson sunbird and oriental magpie robin are common sights. As with many other parks in Singapore, long-tailed macaques also roam freely around the park.

== Activities ==
With a variety of hiking pathways to explore, Dairy Farm Nature Park is known as a refuge for nature lovers and fitness enthusiasts. The Wallace Trail, a 2.2-kilometer walkway that leads from the Rail Corridor to the Wallace Education Center, is the park's most notable feature. For children and the elderly who wish to spend some time in nature, this trail is relatively easy, with a difficulty rating of easy to moderate. The National Parks Board website offers some advice for visitors who wish to try out the Wallace Trail. Some of the advice includes packing a bottle of water to stay hydrated and a towel to wipe off sweat.

The Wallace Trail once used to be home to kampungs and there are still remnants found in the area, tucked away among the plantations. The Wallace Trail is demarcated by wooden signages along the trail to indicate its boundaries and reassure hikers that they are headed in the correct direction. Species visible while hiking on the Wallace Trail include the chempedak tree (Artocarpus integer), various fruit trees, squirrels scampering from one tree to another, and figs.

== Access and directions ==
The park is accessible by private and public transport. A carpark is available for private transport and visitors can reach the park via bus (bus services 700, 700A and 966) and Hillview MRT station.

== See also ==
- List of parks in Singapore
