= Suzanne Saroff =

American photographer and creative director

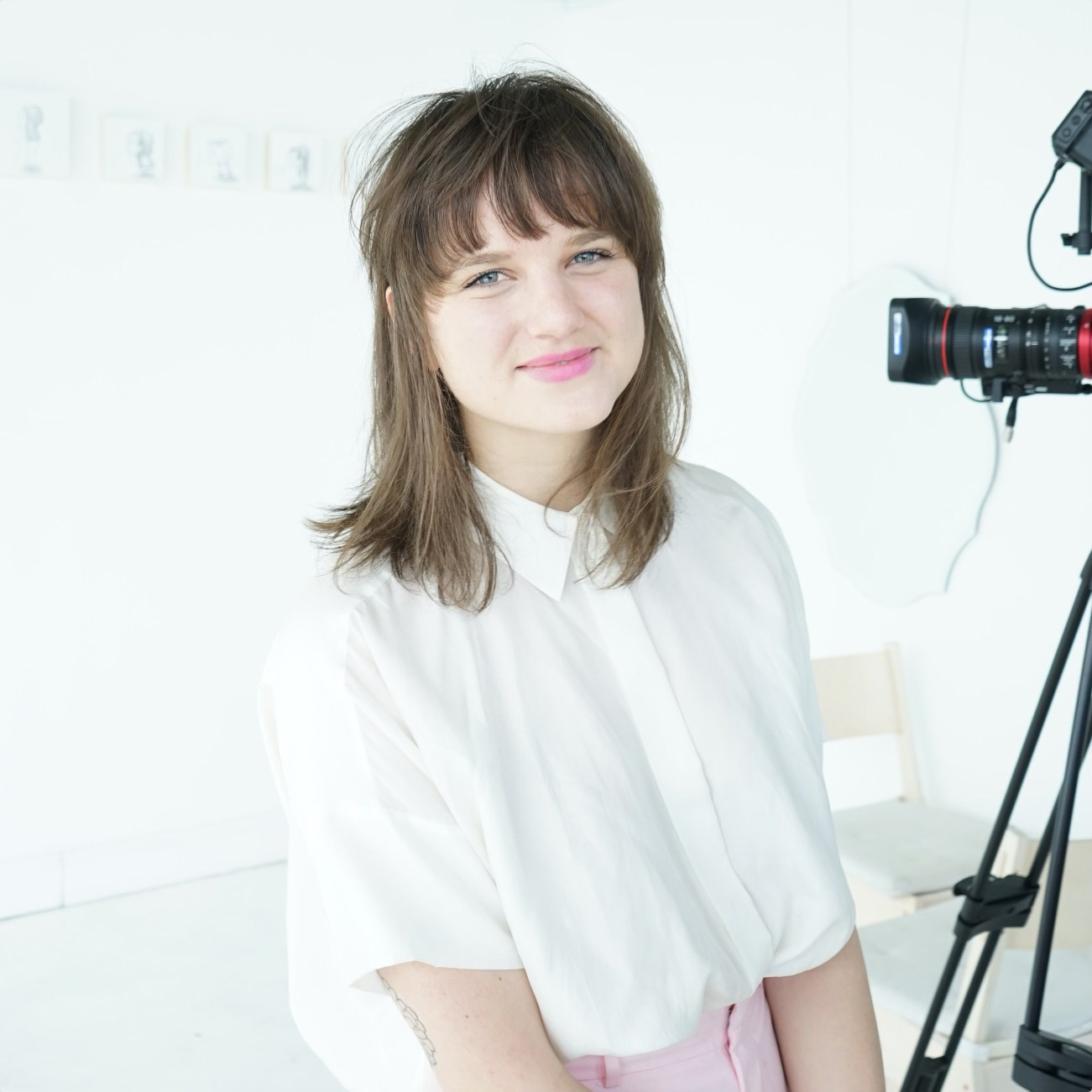
- Born: Missoula, Montana
- Known for: Photography
- Website: www.hisuzanne.com

Suzanne Saroff is an American photographer, video artist, and creative director.

== Early life and education ==
Saroff was born in Missoula, MT.

== Career ==
Saroff is a art director and photographer who makes work of food, flowers and other natural elements, emphasizing luscious colors while distorting images. Her photojournalism has appeared in The New Yorker, The New York Times, Vogue, Harvard Business Review, The Wall Street Journal, and Elle Italy. In May 2026, Saroff was named to Adweek's Creative 100 list. Saroff is a 2023 Young Guns award recipient from The One Club. Her commercial clients include Gucci, Prada, Glossier, Clinique, NARS, Warby Parker, Tin Building by Jean-Georges, Haus Labs by Lady Gaga, Bvlgari.
