= Lady Gaga Fame =

Fragrance created by Lady Gaga

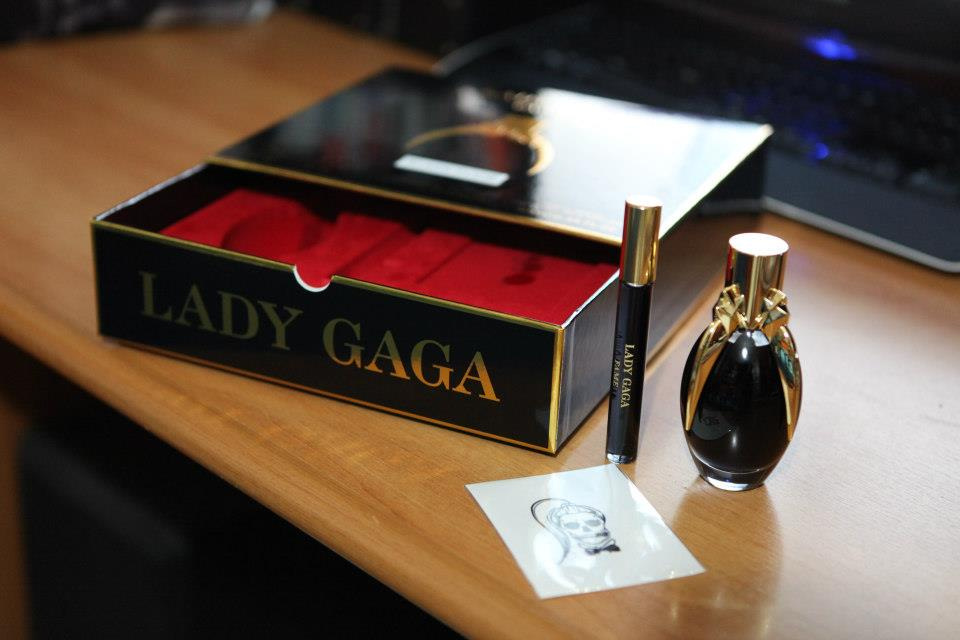

Fragrance by Lady Gaga
- Notes: Atropa belladonna, incense, honey, saffron, apricot, tiger orchid
- Released: August 1, 2012
- Label: Haus Laboratories in association with Coty, Inc.
- Tagline: The first ever black eau de parfum
- Successor: Eau de Gaga
- Website: hauslaboratories.com

Lady Gaga Fame is the first fragrance created by American singer Lady Gaga. A unisex fragrance, it was released in Guggenheim Museum and in Macy's stores in the United States and a range of different stores in the United Kingdom on August 22, 2012, and worldwide in September through the singer's Haus Laboratories label in association with Coty, Inc. According to promotional materials, the perfume uses "push-pull technology", rather than the pyramidal structure traditional of perfumes, to combine notes of atropa belladonna, tiger orchid, incense, apricot, saffron, and honey.

== Development ==
In July 2010, British magazine Marketing reported that singer Lady Gaga had begun working on an "unusual" fragrance with Coty, Inc., set for release around Christmas of that year and to be accompanied by a large advertising campaign. "I know nothing of this project," Coty Beauty vice president Steve Mormoris said at the time. "It is a totally false rumor." Months later, in September, Mormoris announced that the singer had agreed to a long-term licensing deal allowing Coty to release fragrances under her name, with the first perfume expected to be released in spring 2012. In June 2012, Coty announced in a press release that the perfume would be titled Lady Gaga Fame.

== Scent and packaging ==
Reports circulated in early 2011 that Gaga wanted the perfume to smell of blood and semen. The packaging lists the perfume's notes as "tears of belladonna, crushed heart of tiger orchidea with a black veil of incense, pulverized apricot and the combinative essences of saffron and honey drops". According to the product packaging, instead of the pyramidal structure used in most perfumes, Lady Gaga Fame uses "push-pull technology", where the ingredients demonstrate aspects of each note without precedence. Rather than utilizing top, middle, and base notes, the perfume is based on three accords – "dark" (containing the Belladonna notes), "sensual" (containing the honey, saffron, and apricot notes), and "light" (containing the Tiger Orchid notes) which come together to produce a floral, fruity scent.

The perfume references the allure of fame and fortune with its sweet scent and gold crown, a theme Gaga has often explored in her career; the inclusion of the poisonous belladonna, along with the black liquid, represent the dark or destructive effect fame can have on an individual. Gaga states on the back of the packaging that the perfume is "black, like the soul of fame".

Uniquely, Fame is a black perfume that sprays clear and becomes invisible once airborne; according to the Coty press release, it is the first perfume to utilize such technology. The bottle, designed by Gaga and photographer Nick Knight, was described by Billboard magazine as "simple and unfussy" and "crowned with an edgy and alien-like gold cap". Many high personalities were surprised by the perfume's sophistication when compared to other celebrity scents. Two versions of the perfume were released: a less expensive version, which includes a smaller bottle with a plastic cap, while a more expensive "premiere edition", known as Le Masterpiece, includes a larger bottle with a solid metal cap.

== Release and reception ==
Lady Gaga Fame was released worldwide in September 2012 through Gaga's own Paris-based Haus Laboratories label in association with Coty. In the US, it was released in Macy's stores on August 22. The advertising campaign was directed and photographed by Steven Klein, who previously directed Gaga's music video for "Alejandro". The campaign has been compared to the novel Gulliver's Travels. On July 18, 2012, a black and white short film titled, "Formulation", by Todd Tourso, Reggie Know, Rob English, Kenneth Robin, voice and soundtrack by Jean Marc Virard "4THSEX" was released. The two-minute short features attractive male models in various laboratory clothing mixing and boiling chemicals to create the fragrance. Gaga does not appear in the visual. Gaga appeared on the September 2012 cover of Vogue magazine to promote the perfume. Within six months since its release the perfume earned a total revenue of $30 million in the US.

=== Promotional video ===
On August 14, 2012, Gaga released a 30-second trailer of the Lady Gaga Fame commercial which uses her song "Scheiße" as background music. On August 23, 2012, a day after the official launch of the fragrance at Macy's, Lady Gaga aired a second follow-up commercial. It follows the same story line and features Gaga scratching off black ooze, representing her black eau de parfum, from the male model's face. At the end of the ad, Lady Gaga's "Gulliver pose" is transformed into a golden statue similar to the cap from Le Masterpiece. Later the same day, a third subsequent ad was premiered on TV. It features Gaga parading between two sets of male models. On one side there are partially nude men dressed in latex; on the other side are giant size male figures frontally clothed in a half-gown and nude at the side and seemingly at the back. Their faces are disguised by a plastic shield. The two "Gulliver" statues of Gaga are also featured, one with tiny men climbing all over her and the other cast in gold.

The complete commercial video debuted on September 13, 2012 at the Guggenheim Museum, in New York and was released online on the same day at Littlemonsters.com. It was directed by Steven Klein.

== Awards and nominations ==
Year	Award	Category	Result	Ref.
2013	FiFi Awards	Media Campaign of the Year – Women's	Nominated	
2013	FiFi Awards	Consumer Choice – Women's	Nominated	
2013	FiFi Awards (UK)	Best New Celebrity Fragrance	Runner-up	
2013	FiFi Awards (UK)	Best New Female Print Advertisement	Runner-up	
2013	FiFi Awards (UK)	Best New Female Commercial	Nominated	
2013	FiFi Awards (UK)	Ultimate Launch	Nominated	
