= Steven Klein (artist) =

American photographer (born 1965)

Steven Klein (born April 30, 1965 in Cranston, Rhode Island) is an American photographer and videographer based in New York City. He has worked with numerous pop culture figures, including American singer-songwriter Madonna.

== History ==
Steven Klein trained in fine art with a concentration on painting. After studying painting at the Rhode Island School of Design, he moved into the field of photography. Steven Klein began his photographic career in the 1990s in Paris. Klein shot high-profile advertising campaigns for various clients, including Calvin Klein, Dolce & Gabbana, Louis Vuitton, Balenciaga, Alexander McQueen and Nike and is a regular contributor to magazines including American and Paris Vogue, where he photographed Björk. Other publications he worked with include i-D, Numéro, W, and Arena. His work has been featured in numerous exhibitions, most recently at the Gagosian Gallery, California and the Brancolini Grimaldi Gallery in Florence. Steven Klein's photographic shots are mixed with high fashion and transgressive fashion film. Klein is well known for his Interview, and W magazine editorials with various celebrities, including Madonna, Tom Ford, Brad Pitt and Angelina Jolie, Rihanna. He often works with cinematographer David Devlin. He shot the promotional pictures -including the album cover- of Britney Spears' third studio album, Britney. He also worked with Lady Gaga on numerous occasions including a music video for "Alejandro", the album cover for Gaga and Tony Bennett's album Cheek to Cheek, as well as two fragrance campaigns.

== X-STaTIC PRO=CeSS ==
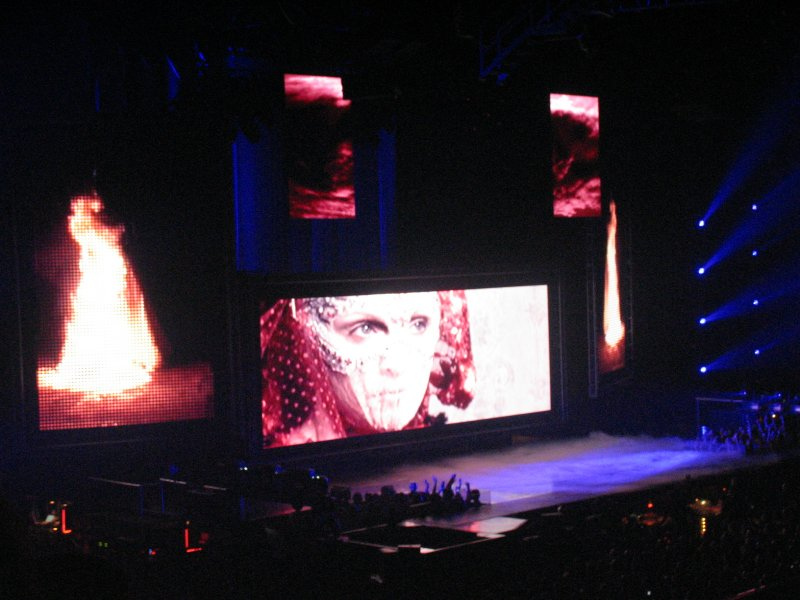
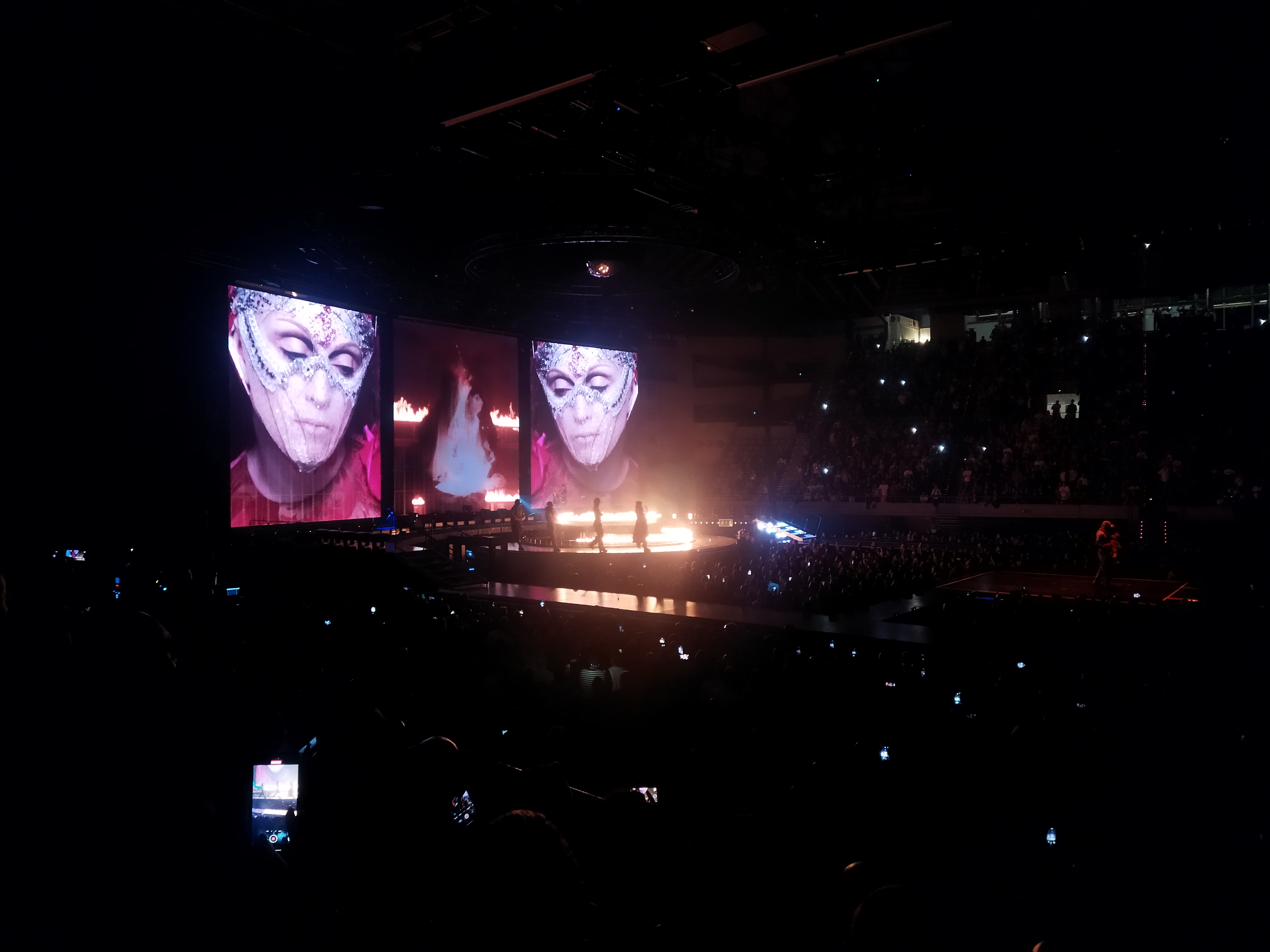
During the Re-Invention World Tour, Madonna used images of X-STaTIC Pro=CeSS in its backdrop videos (left), and once again during her 2023-2024 Celebration Tour (right).

In 2003, Klein collaborated with Madonna, creating an exhibition installation named X-STaTIC PRO=CeSS. It included photography from the photoshoot in W magazine and seven video segments. The installation ran from March 28 to May 3, 2003 in New York gallery, Deitch Projects, it then travelled the world in an edited form.

The title of the exhibition comes from a song called "X-Static Process" on Madonna's 2003 album American Life.

A coffee table book was also released to accompany the exhibition which retailed for $350 and was limited to 1000 copies. The book was designed by Giovanni Bianco and was hand-bound and printed in Italy on customized paper with brushed cotton paper slipcase.

Madonna later used video from the exhibition in her 2004 Re-Invention World Tour during the performances of "The Beast Within" and "Vogue" and in her 2023 The Celebration Tour during “The Beast Within”. Madonna has become a frequent collaborator with Klein, having used his photography on the albums Confessions on a Dance Floor and Hard Candy. He has also contributed videos to her 2006 Confessions Tour and various magazine photo shoots.

== Videography ==
=== Concert backdrop videos ===
- Madonna – "The Beast Within" (2004, Re-Invention World Tour and 2023, The Celebration Tour)
- Madonna – "Vogue" (2004, Re-Invention World Tour)
- Madonna – "Future Lovers"/"I Feel Love" (2006, Confessions Tour)
- Madonna – "Get Together" (2006, Confessions Tour)
- Madonna – "Music Inferno" (2006, Confessions Tour)
- Madonna – "Human Nature" (2008–2009, Sticky & Sweet Tour)
- Madonna – "Get Stupid" (2008–2009, Sticky & Sweet Tour)
- Madonna – "Iconic" (2015–2016, Rebel Heart Tour)

=== Films ===
- Madonna – "Secretprojectrevolution"
- Madonna – "Superstar (Director - Guy Ritchie)"

=== Commercials ===
- Lady Gaga – Fame (Fragrance)
- Lady Gaga – Eau de Gaga (Fragrance)

=== Music Videos ===
- Lady Gaga – Alejandro (2010)
- Brooke Candy – Opulence (2014)
- Kanye West – Wolves (2016)
- Nicki Minaj – Chun-Li (2018)

=== Museum exhibitions ===
- Killer Heels – Brooklyn Museum, 2014.
