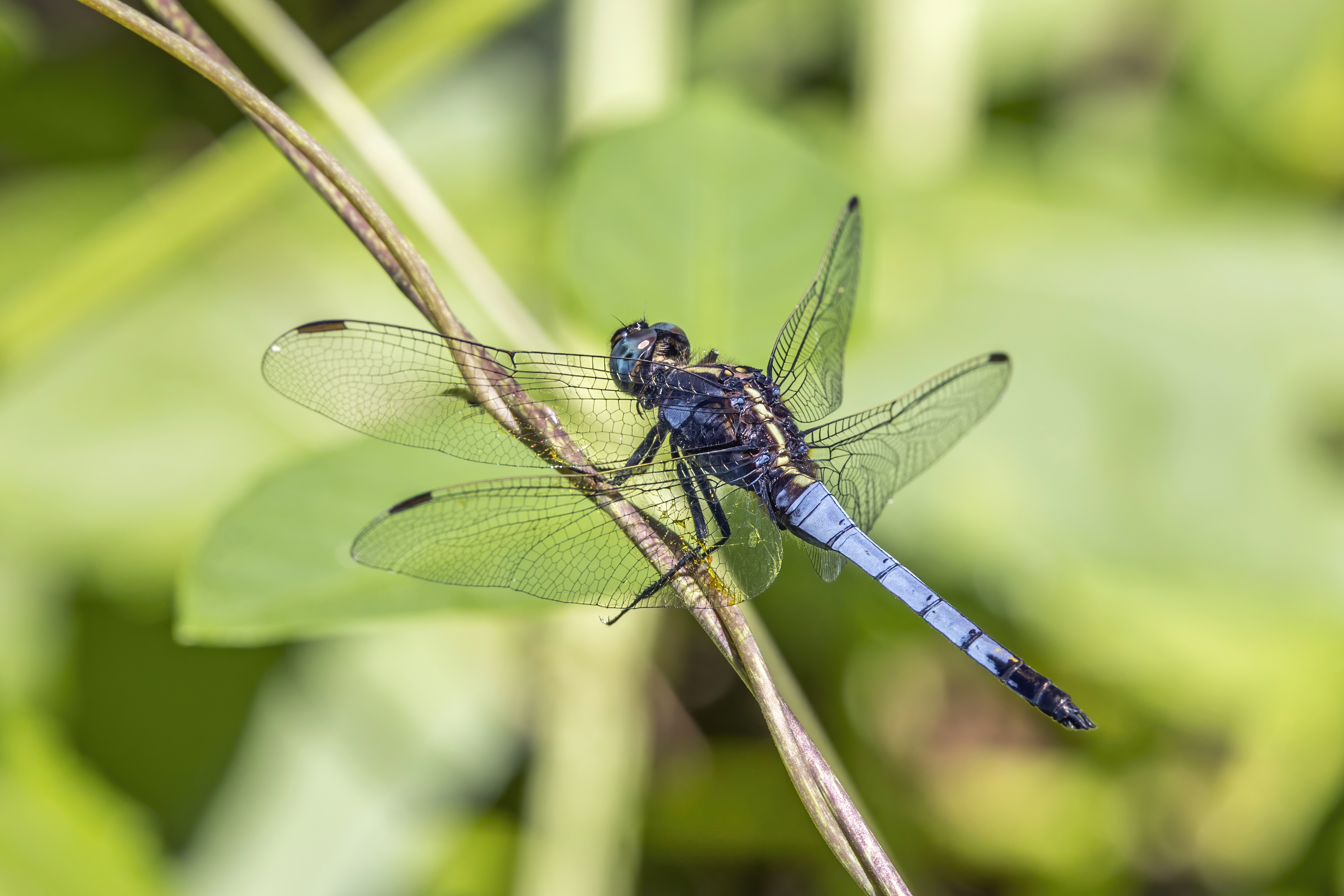
- male
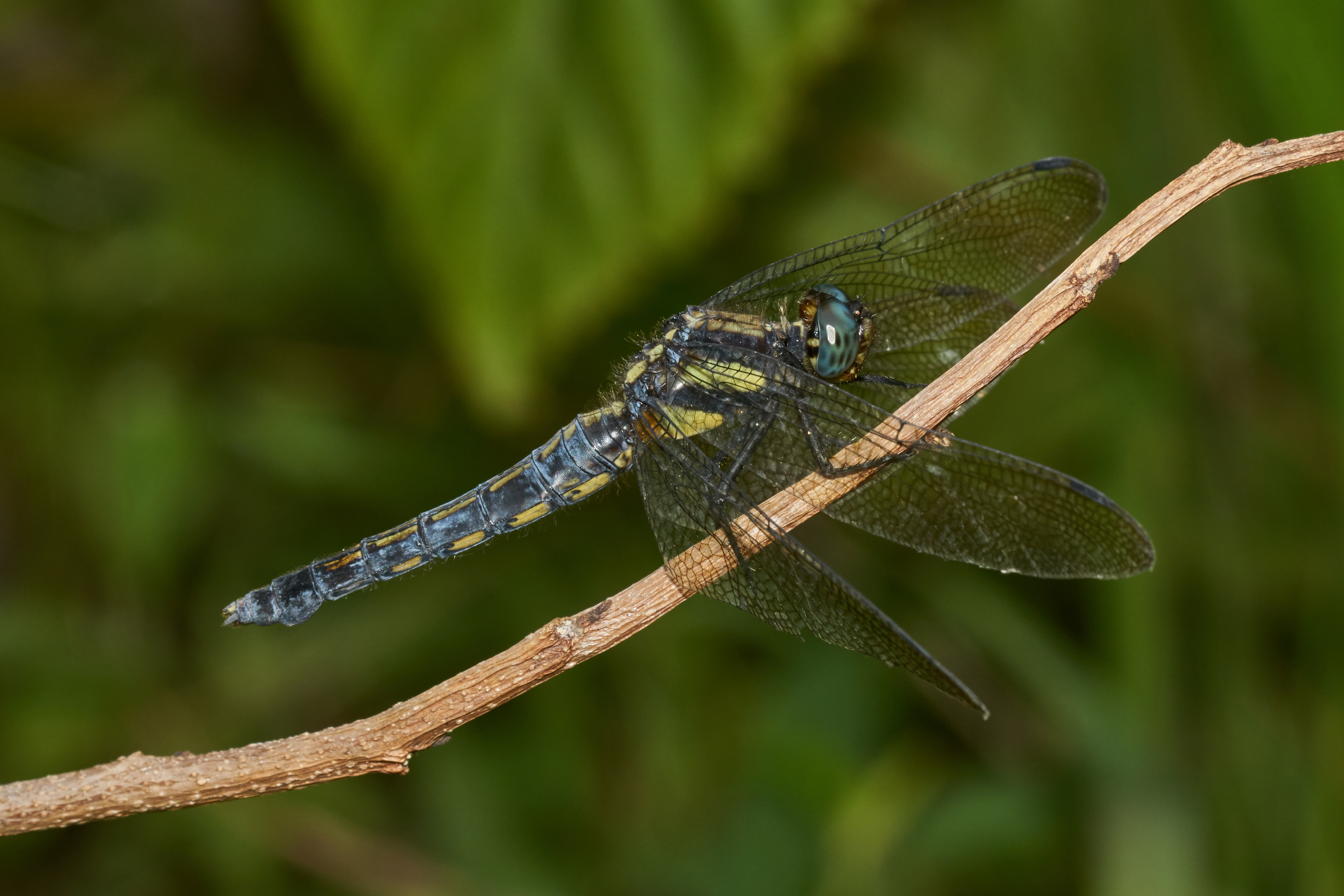
- female

Conservation status
- Least Concern (IUCN 3.1)

Scientific classification
- Kingdom: Animalia
- Phylum: Arthropoda
- Clade: Pancrustacea
- Class: Insecta
- Order: Odonata
- Infraorder: Anisoptera
- Family: Libellulidae
- Genus: Orthetrum
- Species: O. glaucum

Binomial name
- Orthetrum glaucum (Brauer, 1865)

Synonyms
- Orthetrum gangi Sahni, 1965; Orthetrum nicevillei Kirby, 1894

= Orthetrum glaucum =

Species of dragonfly

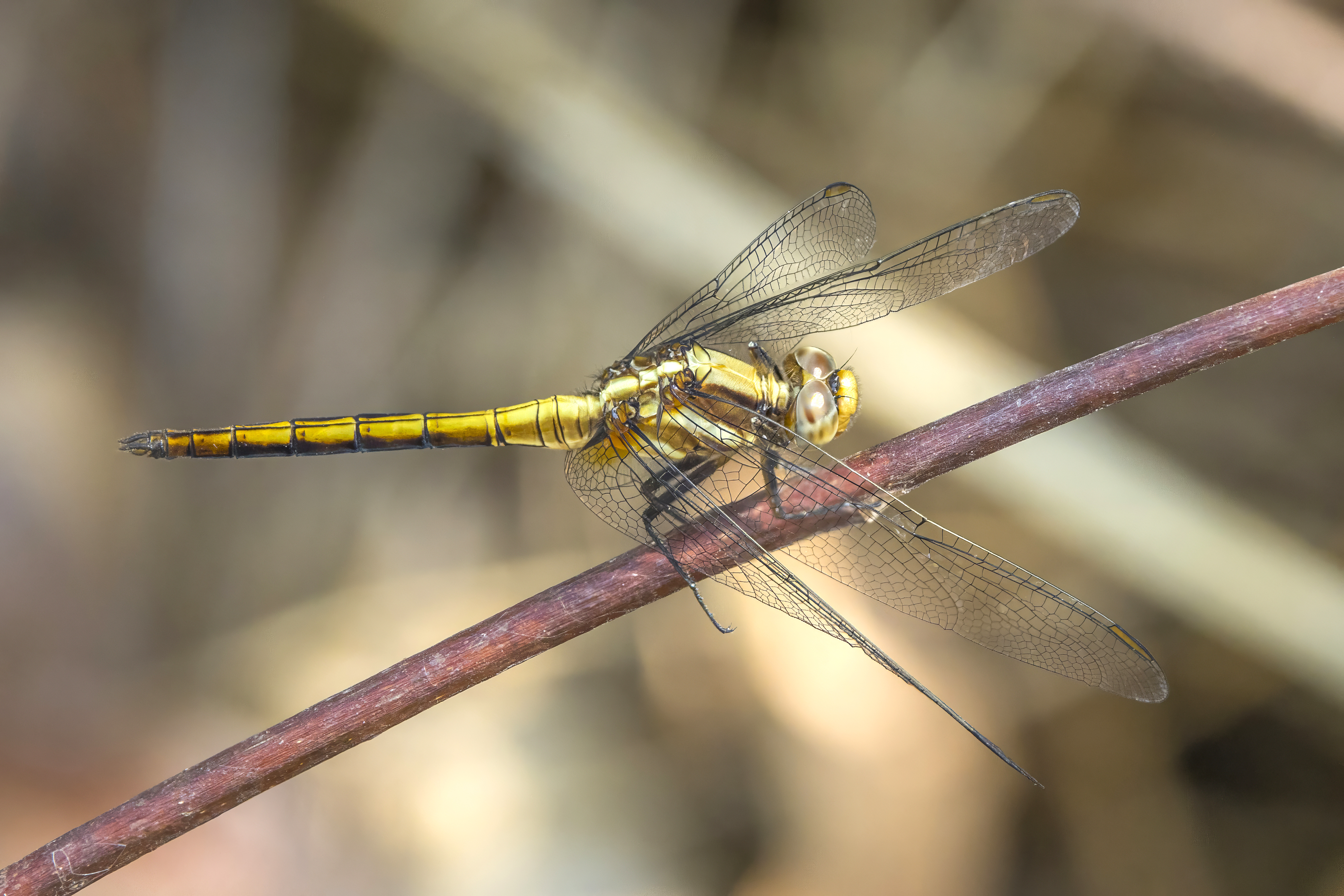
immature male, Laos

Orthetrum glaucum is an Asian dragonfly species, common across much of tropical and subtropical Asia. The common name for this species is blue marsh hawk.

== Description and habitat ==
It is a medium sized dragonfly with dark face and greenish blue eyes. The thorax of old males are dark blue due to pruinescence. Its wings are transparent with dark amber-yellow tint in the extreme base. Its abdomen is pruinosed with blue color up to segment 8; last two segments are black. The abdomens of females and juvenile males are golden in color, with brown stripes along the sides of the thorax. Despite their visual similarities, females and juvenile males can be distinguished by the shape of their final abdomen segment.

It breeds in marshes associated with forest streams, plantations and canals.
