= Eau de Gaga =

Fragrance created by Lady Gaga

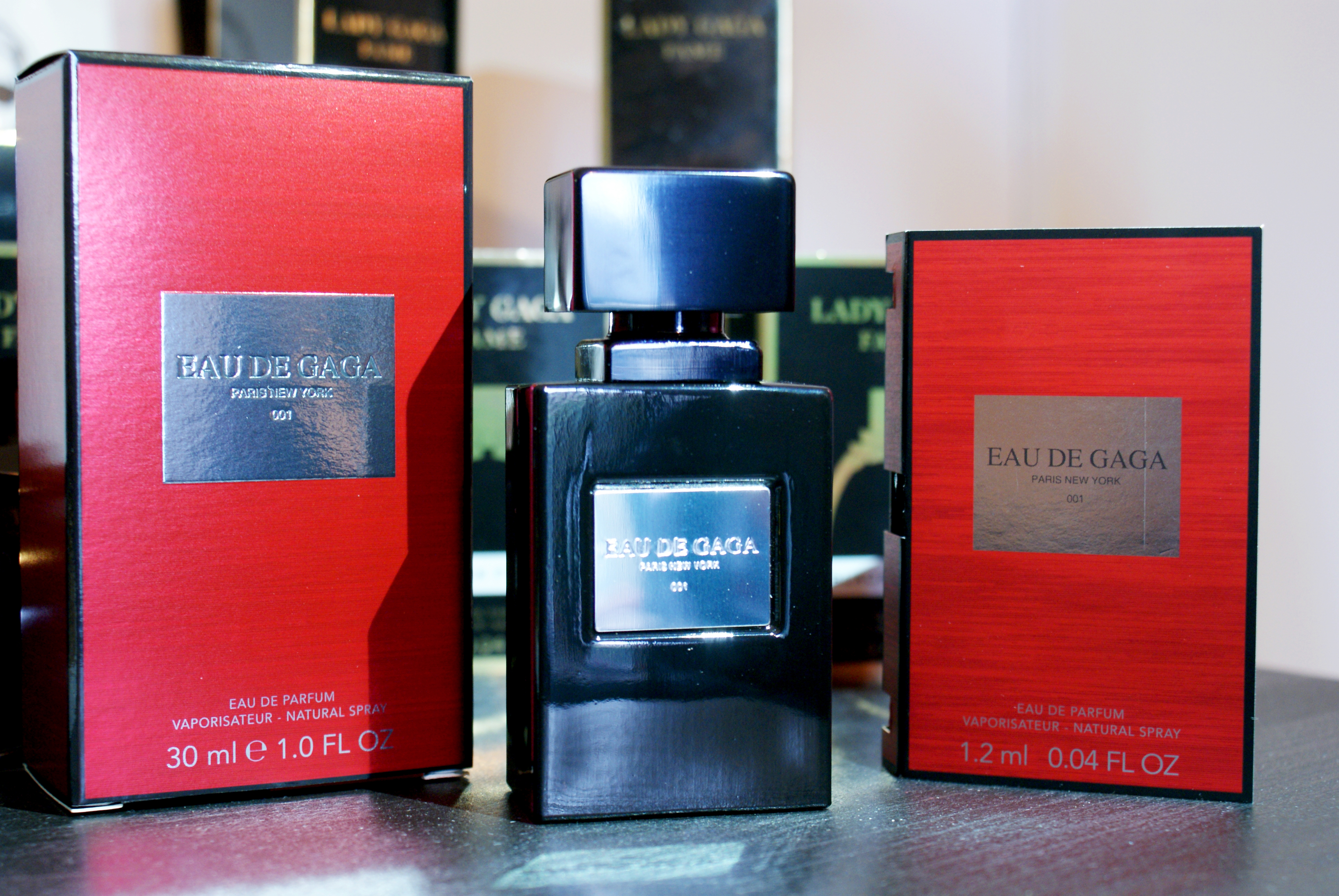

Fragrance by Lady Gaga
- Notes: White violet, lime, leather
- Released: September 1, 2014
- Label: Haus Laboratories in association with Coty, Inc.
- Tagline: For the adventurous woman and the man who loves her
- Predecessor: Fame
- Website: hauslaboratories.com

Eau de Gaga is the second fragrance created by American singer Lady Gaga. The announcement and details of the fragrance were announced on her Haus Laboratories website. The fragrance's notes include white violet, lime, and leather, and it is marketed as being suitable for both men and women.

== Development ==
In August 2014, through social networks, Gaga announced that her second fragrance by Haus Laboratories in association with Coty, Inc. was named Eau de Gaga. She also revealed the first promotional image from the photo shoot of her along with many men which represents how the fragrance can be worn by both genders. The advertising campaign was directed and photographed by Steven Klein, who worked with her first fragrance, Fame. It was first released in September in France, Poland, Germany, U.K., Spain and other countries of Europe. Asia, Oceania, Russia, Denmark and also in some European countries had their launches in November. In the US and Canada, Eau de Gaga landed at retail on January 15, 2015.

== Packaging and collection ==
The Eau de Gaga's bottle is black and meant to simulate both masculine and feminine aesthetics and comes in a rectangular red box. The front of the box reads "Eau de Gaga: Paris New York 001". The 001 is referring to this fragrance being the first out of the entire collection, which is still to be continued. There is also a body lotion and shower gel which is sold separately from the fragrance. The bottles for both the body lotion and shower gel are slim and both have the same box design as the fragrance. The fragrance is available in 15ml, 30ml, 50ml and 75ml. Both the body lotion and the shower gel are available in 75ml and 200ml.

== Promotion ==
In August 2014, Gaga presented the first promotional image for the fragrance. It shows herself in a long gown lying on top of many males. This was represented as the scent being suitable for both men and women to wear. Later, the official poster was revealed by Gaga on her social networks. On the Haus Laboratories website a countdown began, which served to show more details for the upcoming scent. Once the countdown was over, more promotional images were shown on the website, plus retail prices, ingredients and much more. Lady Gaga stated that this fragrance was only volume 001 and that there will be an entire collection of Eau de Gaga fragrances.

On September 19, 2014, a commercial video was released, showing Gaga with long blond hair and wearing a low-cut gown, atop a pile of shirtless male models while her duet with Tony Bennett, "I Can't Give You Anything but Love" plays in the background. The song choice is from her collaborative jazz album with Bennett, called Cheek to Cheek. The black-and-white video is one minute long and was shot and directed by Steven Klein. According to the Washington Jewish Week, Eau de Gaga was the tenth best-selling perfume for 2014, with estimated sales of 23,000 units.
