= Haus Labs =

Cosmetics brand

Haus Labs by Lady Gaga
- Official logo
- Formerly: Haus Laboratories (2019–2022)
- Type: Private
- Industry: Cosmetics
- Founded: September 17, 2019; 7 years ago
- Founder: Lady Gaga
- Headquarters: El Segundo, California, United States
- Area served: Worldwide
- Key people: Lady Gaga (Co-Founder)
- Products: Cosmetics; Beauty products
- Website: hauslabs.com

Haus Labs by Lady Gaga (or simply Haus Labs; formerly known as Haus Laboratories) is an American vegan and cruelty-free cosmetics brand founded by singer Lady Gaga. First launched on September 17, 2019, it was the first beauty line to launch exclusively on Amazon as a retailer partner, and released in nine countries including France, Germany, Japan, the United Kingdom, and the United States. Haus Labs relaunched on June 9, 2022 with new retail partner Sephora.

== History ==
=== Background ===
Lady Gaga first used the trademark "Haus Laboratories" between 2012 and 2014, releasing two fragrances, Fame and Eau de Gaga, in association with Coty.

In February 2018, Gaga filed for trademarks for "Haus Beauty" and "Haus Labs" through her company, Ate My Heart Inc. At the Met Gala in May 2019, fans began to suspect that the makeup she wore was a preview of her upcoming brand. She had also used the hashtag #HausBeauty on several posts on her Instagram. Haus Laboratories is Gaga's first solo cosmetics venture; previously, she had collaborated with MAC Cosmetics for their 2011 Viva Glam Lipstick campaign, starring in a video directed by Nick Knight.

"Our key principles are: a spirit of art, a spirit of science, and the spirit of kindness. As long as those three things are present, I feel like we are doing the thing that we’ve set out to do. I used to always say, 'The world doesn’t necessarily need another beauty brand, but if we can create something that is pushing the boundaries of what it means to make make-up, then it’s worth it.' We want to make make-up for people that love to explore the artist within themselves and see themselves as a canvas. We want to be the supplier of tools, and for those tools to be truly good for you."

— Gaga in an article by British Vogue, 2023

Gaga stated in an interview with The Business of Fashion that she partnered with Amazon because it was the only retailer willing to let her commercialize a brand that aligned with her principles, saying "no message of self-acceptance, no deal".

The first iteration of the team assembled by Gaga and ex-CEO Ben Jones, the former executive at The Honest Company and Zynga (a mobile game company behind FarmVille and Words with Friends), consisted of 15 people, such as veterans from Milk Makeup and Benefit Cosmetics owned by LVMH, as well as Gaga's makeup artist, Sarah Tanno, the brand's global artistry director. They also secured backing from Lightspeed Venture Partners, an investor in companies including Goop and Stitch Fix.

=== Beauty line launch (2019–2022) ===
Haus Labs' first products were available for pre-order for Amazon Prime members and through the company's website on July 15, 2019. For the official launch, Gaga hosted a party, called "Haus Party", with 500 guests, on September 16, 2019, in Santa Monica. During her speech, she claimed "we're not just launching makeup. This is a glamour attack on the world to be accepting, humble, brave and, above all, empowered to be kind. No matter how you identify, all are welcome at Haus Laboratories". It was launched simultaneously on Amazon in nine countries, including the US, France, and Germany, while customers from other locations could order from the company's online store. The first products included lip liner, lip gloss, and liquid-to-powder shimmer.

=== Rebranding (2022–present) ===
In 2022, Haus Laboratories was renamed "Haus Labs by Lady Gaga" as part of its rebranding campaign. The brand was relaunched June 9, 2022, moving from Amazon to Sephora as its retail outlet. The first round of products became available at select outlets, with plans to roll out to over 500 outlets across the United States and Canada in fall. According to Gaga, 2,700 "dirty" ingredients were removed during the rebranding process, replaced with ingredients such as hyaluronic acid and vegan collagen.

== Business ==
=== Marketing ===
A one-minute launch video titled "Our Haus. Your Rules." was released on July 9, 2019. It was directed by Daniel Sannwald and featured Gaga encouraging people to embrace the individuality and express it through bold makeup and body art with her collection of makeup. The video was accompanied by the then-unreleased "Babylon" (Haus Labs version), produced by Gaga in collaboration with Bloodpop, Tchami, and Boys Noize. Promoting part one of the Cosmic Love Holiday Collection, Haus Labs released a video featuring Gaga along with other models wearing the new products. On May 18, 2020, the brand released a video with Gaga accompanied by guests such as RuPaul's Drag Race All Stars season 2 winner Alaska Thunderfuck, RuPaul's Drag Race season 10 winner Aquaria, and the YouTubers Aaliyah Jay and Patrick Starrr among others, lip syncing to "Stupid Love", promoting the eye shadow palette of the same name. On July 31, 2020, a video featuring Gaga was released to promote their gel pencil eyeliners, named Eye-Dentify.

Haus Labs had a failed launch in 2019 on Amazon and relaunched on Sephora in 2022 with a 400% revenue growth.

=== Sales ===
According to reports by WWD, Haus Labs had the third-highest media value of celebrity makeup brands in 2020, earning over $141.7 million, only behind Fenty Beauty and Kylie Cosmetics. In 2021, the brand had a revenue of around $20 million, according to Business Insider.

== Products ==
On September 17, 2019, Haus Laboratories launched the first products, six kits inspired by the houses of the 1980s ball culture. They featured three products each: Glam Attack (a shimmer pigment), R.I.P. Lip Liner, and Le Riot Lip Gloss. On November 14, the line announced that they would be launching their first holiday collection, titled Cosmic Love, with a new formula and more glittered lip liners, lip gloss, and shimmer powders, along with their first-ever bullet lipstick. It was released on November 18, 2019.

On May 19, 2020, Haus Labs launched the Stupid Love Palette, inspired by Gaga's sixth studio album, Chromatica (2020). On August 4, 2020, the brand released their new collection of gel pencil eyeliners, made into 20 different shades and available in three different finishes. Both Gaga and Ariana Grande wore these eyeliners in the music video for "Rain On Me". On October 6, 2020, Haus Labs launched a blush–highlighter duo and a bronzing–highlighter duo. In an interview with Refinery29, Gaga stated "we formulated them to be a silky powder, that leaves a clean buildable finish with rich, flirtatious hues and beaming highlighters. I've named them Heat Spell and Head Rush to indicate the ecstasy of celebrating you."

As part of the celebration of the tenth anniversary of Born This Way, on June 8, 2021, Haus Labs released the Bad Kid Vault, a limited-edition makeup box set including 16 products, such as eyeliners, lip crayons, lip glosses and a red sparkle lipstick. The brand also launched the Be Kind. Be Brave. Be You. Bundle, which included Gaga's anthology book, Channel Kindness: Stories of Kindness and Community and three lip crayons. On September 28 of that year, Haus Labs released the Love for Sale Eyeshadow Palette, inspired by her second collaborative album with Tony Bennett, Love for Sale (2021).

On September 8, 2022, the brand launched their first line of complexion products, the Triclone Skin Tech liquid foundation. Designed to be inclusive to a wide range of skin tones, it is sold in 51 different shades.

== Awards and accolades ==
=== Haus Laboratories ===
- Best New Brand, 2020 Allure Readers' Choice Awards

Edge Precision Brow Pencil

- Best Brow Pencil, 2021 Allure Best of Beauty Awards

=== Haus Labs By Lady Gaga ===
Triclone Skin Tech Medium Coverage Foundation

- Best Breakthrough Product (Color Cosmetics), BeautyMatter NEXT Awards 2023
- Best Clean Makeup, Allure Best of Beauty Awards 2023
- Best Lightweight Foundation For Smooth Coverage, PureWow "The 19 Best Lightweight Foundations for Smooth Coverage" 2023
- Best Foundation For Redness, Real Simple "The 15 Best Foundations of 2023, Tested & Reviewed" 2023
- Best Foundation For Redness, Woman's World "The 12 Best Foundations for Mature Skin That Will Cover + Repair Flaws" 2023
- Best Foundations For Dry Skin: Medium Coverage, VOGUE "The Best Foundations for Dry Skin, According to Pro Makeup Artists and Vogue Editors" 2023
- Nourishing Foundation, Oprah Daily Beauty O-Wards 2023
- Best Foundation Overall, New York Post "We tested the best full-coverage foundations of 2023: Here are our 14 favorites" 2023
- Best Foundation For Calming, ELLE "12 Best Waterproof Foundations for Streak-Free Days" 2023
- Best Clean Foundation For Dry Skin, Forbes "The 10 Best Foundations For Dry Skin That Hydrate And Boost Radiance" 2023
- Best Overall Foundation, Who What Wear "I Tested Natural-Looking Foundations—These 10 Look Just Like My Skin But Better" 2023
- Best Foundation, Women's Health Beauty Awards 2023

== Philanthropy ==
One dollar from every purchase on Haus Labs' official website is donated to the Born This Way Foundation, a non-profit organization founded in 2012 by Gaga and her mother, Cynthia Germanotta. The same amount from every purchase of the Love for Sale Eyeshadow Palette was donated to Tony Bennett's charity, Exploring the Arts, founded in 1999.

== See also ==
- Fenty Beauty
- Rare Beauty
