= Tiger orchid =

Tiger orchid is a common name for several orchids and may refer to:

- Diuris sulphurea, native to eastern Australia
- Elleanthus, native to the neotropics
- Grammatophyllum speciosum, the world's largest orchid, native to southeast Asia
- Maxillaria, native to the neotropics
- Rossioglossum grande, native to Central America

== Gallery ==
Flowers of Grammatophyllum speciosum

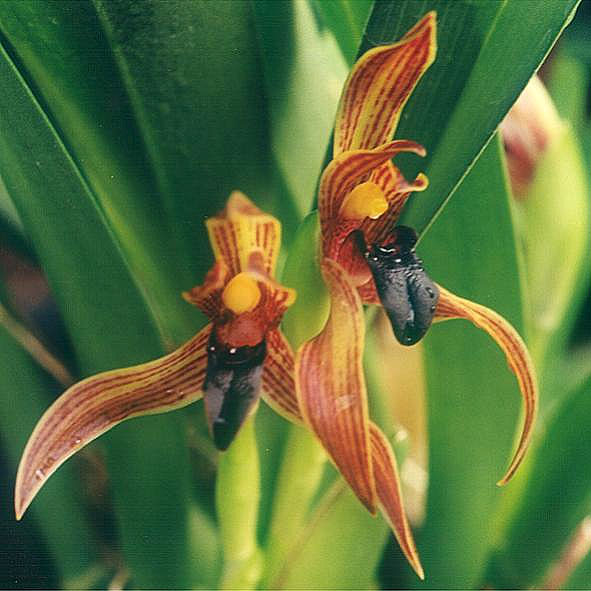
Flowers of a species of Maxillaria

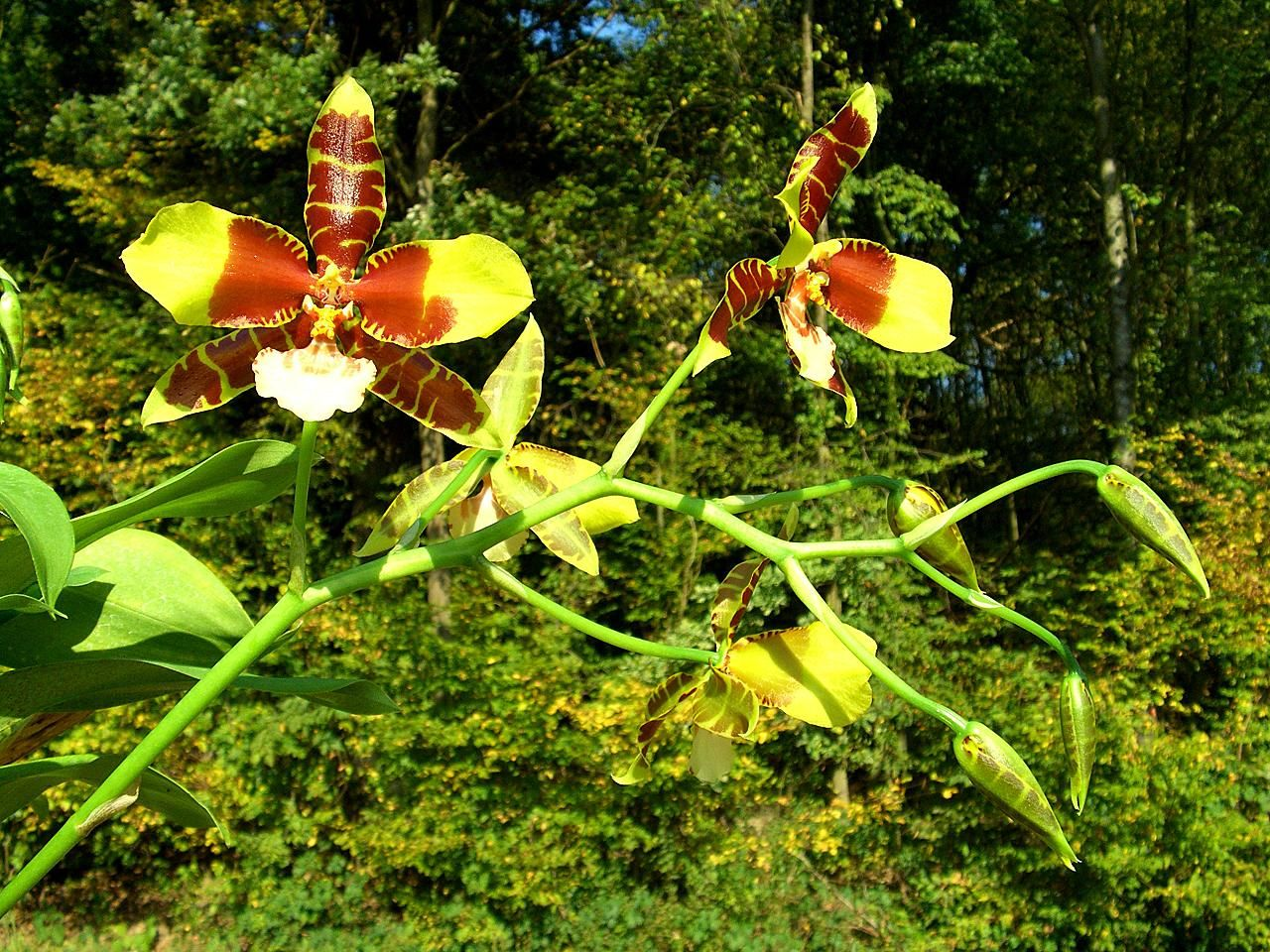
Flowers of Rossioglossum grande
