= Babylon (Lady Gaga song) =

2020 song by Lady Gaga

Song by Lady Gaga

from the album Chromatica
- Released: May 29, 2020
- Studio: Henson (Los Angeles)
- Genre: House
- Length: 2:41
- Label: Interscope
- Songwriters: Lady Gaga; BloodPop; Matthew Burns
- Producers: BloodPop; Burns; Tchami

Audio video
- "Babylon" on YouTube

"Babylon" is a song by the American singer Lady Gaga recorded for her sixth studio album, Chromatica (2020). It appears as the album's final track on its standard edition. Written by Gaga, BloodPop and Burns, and produced by the latter two with additional production from Tchami, it is a house song featuring piano, saxophone, a gospel choir and partly rapped vocals. Influenced by late-1980s and 1990s dance music, the song addresses gossip through references to the ancient city of Babylon and the biblical Tower of Babel. Gaga viewed the song as a celebration of personal growth and finding freedom despite the gossip that had once affected her.

Music critics praised the song's camp sensibility and its effectiveness as the album's closing track, although some criticized its lyrics and lack of originality. "Babylon" drew numerous comparisons to Madonna's 1990 single "Vogue", with critics divided over the similarities between the two songs. An early version of "Babylon" was previewed in a 2019 promotional video for Gaga's cosmetics brand Haus Laboratories. It was subsequently released as the "Haus Labs Version" on her remix album Dawn of Chromatica (2021), alongside a separate remix featuring Bree Runway and Jimmy Edgar. Gaga performed the song on The Chromatica Ball stadium tour (2022).

== Background and development ==
Lady Gaga began working on demos with BloodPop for her sixth studio album Chromatica at her home studio around the time of the filming of A Star Is Born (2018) and following the Joanne World Tour (2017–2018). Gaga recalled developing lyrics, melodies and chord progressions at the piano while BloodPop either sat beside her or worked at a computer in the control room. She said that writing with BloodPop helped her deal with the challenging period she was going through at the time. BloodPop recalled that they were initially unsure what direction to take with the album, but songs such as "Babylon", "Enigma" and "Alice" helped Gaga figure out what she wanted it to be. In early 2019, BloodPop invited British producer Burns to work on the album, at which point much of the songwriting was already underway but its sound had yet to be fully developed. The collaborators later moved to Henson Recording Studios to complete the album.

In an interview with Zane Lowe, Gaga said the healing she described in "Sine from Above" allowed her to close Chromatica by dancing to "Babylon", a song about gossip. She recalled that gossip once made her feel "so small and so chained", but she had since learned to dance "with the chains on" and still feel free. In commentary for Spotify, she described "Babylon" as a celebration of the album's conclusion and the new beginnings that follow. She explained that moving through pain and change allowed her to become "a new me", giving her something to celebrate. Ahead of The Chromatica Ball tour in July 2022, Gaga connected the lyric "battle for your life" to her personal experiences, recalling that she had been fighting for her own well-being while making Chromatica.

== Recording and composition ==
"Babylon"
A 17-second sample of "Babylon" featuring its house production, a loon call, and lyrics referencing an ancient city.

"Babylon" is a house song featuring piano, saxophone and a partly rapped vocal delivery. Critics also noted influences from ballroom culture and hi-NRG music. According to the sheet music published on Musicnotes, the song is set in common time at a tempo of 116 beats per minute. Gaga uses four different vocal approaches and a key change within the song's first 35 seconds, with a gospel choir joining later in the track. The song was recorded at Henson Recording Studios in Los Angeles by Benjamin Rice, who also handled its vocal production. Burns cited 808 State, the Future Sound of London and the Beloved as influences on "Babylon". To evoke the sound of 1990s dance music, the producers used a Roland TR-909 drum machine, a Korg M1 and a Roland SH-101 synthesizer. More specifically, Burns drew inspiration from 808 State's "Pacific State" (1989), incorporating a sample of a Canadian loon into "Babylon" as a tribute to the song and the acid house music of the late 1980s and early 1990s. Mixing engineer Tom Norris also used the Inphonik RX950 Classic AD/DA converter effect on "Babylon" to emulate the sound of the Akai S950 sampler heard on "Pacific State".

The lyrics reference the ancient city of Babylon and the biblical Tower of Babel, incorporating wordplay between "babble on" and "Babylon". Callie Ahlgrim of Insider noted that the song places the harmful effects of gossip within the biblical story of Babylon, which concerns difficulties in communication across different cultures. Jackson McHenry of Vulture interpreted the lyrics as a commentary on celebrity gossip and Gaga's public image, suggesting that the line "Money don't talk, rip that song" pokes fun at her reputation for having her music leaked. Laura Dzubay of Consequence of Sound viewed it as a condemnation of gossip and the tendency to trust others' opinions over one's own understanding of oneself. Alessa Dominguez of BuzzFeed News compared its themes of decadence and gossip to those of Gaga's earlier track "Donatella" from Artpop (2013). Variety's Jem Aswad noted that the lyric "We can party like it's B.C." acquired a new meaning during the COVID-19 pandemic, with "B.C." also interpretable as "before coronavirus".

== Critical reception ==
Joe Lynch of Billboard called "Babylon" a "diva house delight", identifying it as one of the album's "emotionally resonant dancefloor bangers". Reanna Cruz of NPR Music considered the song's campiness one of its strongest aspects, imagining a music video featuring people in togas and laurel headbands "voguing down a cobblestone runway". Adam White of The Independent described "Babylon" as "camp as Christmas" and "a final shot of energy" on its parent album. Michael Cragg of The Guardian felt that "Babylon" "pulls off the very Gaga trick of conflating the big and the small", combining biblical and mythological references with the complexities of fame. Neil McCormick of The Daily Telegraph cited "Babylon", alongside Chromatica's "Stupid Love" and "Enigma", as an example of Gaga's ability to convey escapism through her music. Katherine St. Asaph of Pitchfork identified "Babylon" and "Alice" as the two high-concept songs on Chromatica, describing the former as "deliberately silly". Jeremy J. Fisette of Beats Per Minute found it "fun, funny, and slightly ridiculous".

Patrick Gomez of The A.V. Club felt that "Babylon" ended Chromatica "with a smile", likening it to a RuPaul's Drag Race performance. Matthew Hocter of Albumism considered it the album's best track, calling it a "made-for-PRIDE paean to the LGBTQ community". Writing for The New York Times, Wesley Morris regarded "Babylon" as a possible "return to form" for Gaga, enjoying its catchy lyrics and camp delivery, while the outlet's Lindsay Zoladz called the song "ridiculous" but counted it among her favorites from Chromatica, expressing regret that the pandemic prevented audiences from experiencing it at live concerts. Nylon's Salvatore Maicki characterized it as "a gaudy and glorious number that sounds like something the Flintstones might vogue to." Insider's Callie Ahlgrim considered "Babylon" a fitting album closer, finding that it recalled Gaga's earlier music while still sounding fresh and modern. Courteney Larocca from the same publication called the song "killer", believing that it was "exactly what was missing from Gaga's discography".

Kristen S. Hé of Vulture likened the track to "a puzzle where the pieces don't quite fit" because of its combination of house snares, saxophone, and a gospel choir, while commending Gaga's delivery for making the unusual mix work. Carl Wilson of Slate criticized the wordplay between "babble on" and "Babylon" as unoriginal, but ultimately enjoyed the song, calling it "so kooky and obliviously tasteless and self-affirming" in a "quintessentially Gaga fashion". Mesfin Fekadu of the Associated Press preferred "Babylon" and "911" to much of Chromatica, though he thought both sounded like "leftover tracks" from 2011's Born This Way. Slant Magazine's writers were more negative; Sal Cinquemani criticized the song for "nonsensically" conflating tabloid culture with ancient Mesopotamian history, while Alexa Camp took issue with Gaga's "wooden delivery". Konstantinos Pappis of Our Culture Mag found the track "derivative" and felt that Gaga took its absurd premise too far.

Madonna singing "Vogue" during her 2012 tour. "Babylon" received several comparisons to the song.

"Babylon" has been widely compared to Madonna's 1990 single "Vogue" by journalists. Stephen Daw of Billboard found the resemblance particularly striking, citing similarities in the songs' piano arrangements, spoken-sung choruses and chord progressions. Nick Smith of musicOMH similarly called "Babylon" a "deconstructed Vogue", interpreting it as a tribute to Madonna and Shep Pettibone (co-writer and co-producer of "Vogue") while still considering it "classic Gaga". Wesley Morris in The New York Times likened the song's sound to a combination of the B-52's and Grace Jones reworking Madonna's "Vogue" into "Like a Prayer". Kory Grow of Rolling Stone called Gaga's rap delivery on the track "near-plagiaristic" of "Vogue", thinking that the latter's line "Bette Davis, we love you" could be sung over Gaga's lyrics without disrupting the rhythm.

The A.V. Club's Patrick Gomez and Mikael Wood of the Los Angeles Times both argued that "Babylon" borrowed more overtly from "Vogue" than Gaga's "Born This Way" did from Madonna's "Express Yourself", with Gomez suggesting that the resemblance would further anger Madonna's fans. Caryn Ganz of The New York Times, however, welcomed Gaga's "willingness to gesture to 'Vogue'" despite the earlier criticism surrounding "Born This Way". Beats Per Minute's Fisette acknowledged the song's close resemblance to "Vogue", but pointed out that Madonna herself had borrowed from New York's drag and ballroom culture. Dan Weiss of Spin criticized "Babylon" for its lack of originality, arguing that despite Gaga's ability to turn awkward lyrics into camp classics, the song "isn't the 'Vogue' it wants to be".

== Commercial performance ==
"Babylon" peaked at number 17 on the US Billboard Hot Dance/Electronic Songs chart. Internationally, the song reached number 77 on Greece's International Digital Singles Chart and number 136 in Portugal. It also reached number 97 on the UK Audio Streaming Chart. The Haus Labs version separately peaked at number 30 on the US Hot Dance/Electronic Songs chart in 2021.

== Live performances ==
Gaga performing "Babylon" on The Chromatica Ball (2022)

"Babylon" was included in the set list of The Chromatica Ball (2022), Gaga's first all-stadium concert tour. Ahead of the tour's opening concert, Gaga alluded to the song in a social media post, writing, "I'll see you in BABYLON". Billboard's Joe Lynch compared the tour's stage design to Fritz Lang's film Metropolis (1927), suggesting that the similarities might have been intentional given the references to Babylon in both the film and Gaga's song. "Babylon" was the first track performed in the show's third act, following the instrumental interlude "Chromatica III". Gaga and her dancers appeared in matching gold satin outfits for the song and performed voguing-inspired choreography. Gaga's metallic gold moiré ensemble, consisting of a tailored jacket, a sleeveless top and wide-leg trousers, was created by the fashion house Alexander McQueen. She dedicated the performance to its late founder. Towards the song's gospel-style finale, Gaga added a floor-length cape to her outfit.

David Cobbald of The Line of Best Fit described the performance as featuring "space-age god-like imagery", while Selena Fragassi of the Chicago Sun-Times called it Gaga's "Babylonian golden goddess moment". Echoing the earlier comparisons to Madonna's "Vogue", Bob Gendron of the Chicago Tribune interpreted Gaga's "power-suit" outfit as another nod to the singer. Lauren O'Neill of The i Paper described the choreography as "thrilling" and influenced by the style of Bob Fosse. Mikael Wood of the Los Angeles Times wrote of the "grit" in Gaga's voice as she reached a high note during "Babylon", calling her "a live singer through and through".

== Remixes ==
An instrumental excerpt of an early version of "Babylon" was previewed on July 9, 2019, in a promotional video announcing Gaga's cosmetics brand Haus Laboratories. The video and its accompanying social media post used the song's lyric "battle for your life", with the latter crediting the music to Gaga, BloodPop, Tchami and Boys Noize. In June 2020, producer BloodPop confirmed that the alternate recording would eventually be released. Titled "Babylon (Haus Labs Version)", it was included on Gaga's remix album Dawn of Chromatica, released on September 3, 2021, alongside a separate remix featuring British musician Bree Runway and American producer Jimmy Edgar. BloodPop and Tchami are credited as remixers on the released Haus Labs version. Joey Nolfi of Entertainment Weekly described the music heard in the advertisement as "sledgehammering" and considered the finished version worthy of release as a single. James Hodge of Attitude likened the Haus Labs version to "a track from the runway of a ballroom competition", noting its "more manic energy" from the heavier use of drums and guitar.

Runway first revealed her involvement with the Chromatica remix project in May 2021, before hinting that she would appear on "Babylon" that August by posting the song's lyrics on social media. She later explained that BloodPop had invited her to participate and that she had chosen "Babylon" herself. She waited several weeks before writing her verse, nervous about disappointing Gaga, whom she regarded as an idol. Nolfi described the remix as a "throbbing techno revamp". Runway's verse references Gaga's earlier singles "Just Dance" and "Poker Face", and she sings harmonies with Gaga and the backing choir. Edgar adds heavier beats and more prominent beat drops to the production. For NPR Music, Reanna Cruz praised Runway's confident vocal delivery, singling out the line "Face card on and it never declines", as well as the replacement of the original's 1980s-inspired piano with a bass synthesizer, which she wrote gave the song "that final push to conquer the clubs". In an Entertainment Weekly article selecting the best song from each of Gaga's albums, Marcus Jones chose the remix as the standout track from Dawn of Chromatica, writing that among the album's more unconventional collaborations, "it's Bree Runway who shines". Slant Magazine's Alexa Camp commended Runway for bringing "some swagger" to the song, while Lauren O'Neill of Vice called the remix "superlative". Runway performed the remix at Birmingham Pride in September 2021.

== Credits and personnel ==
Credits adapted from the liner notes of Chromatica.

=== Management ===
- Published by Sony/ATV and FlyEye
- Recorded and mixed at Henson Recording Studios (Los Angeles, California)
- Mastered at Sterling Sound

=== Personnel ===
- Lady Gaga – vocals, songwriter
- BloodPop – producer, songwriter, drums, bass, keyboards, percussion
- Burns – producer, songwriter, drums, bass, keyboards, percussion
- Tchami – additional producer
- Benjamin Rice – recording engineer, mixing engineer, vocal producer
- Tom Norris – mixing engineer
- E. Scott Kelly – mixing assistant
- Randy Merrill – mastering engineer
- Rachel Mazer – saxophone
- Adryon De Leon – background vocals, choir
- Daniel Ozan – background vocals, choir
- India Carney – background vocals, choir
- Jantre Christian – background vocals, choir
- Jyvonne Haskin – background vocals, choir
- Laurhan Beato – background vocals, choir
- Matthew Bloyd – background vocals, choir
- Ronald O'Hannon – background vocals, choir
- Shameka Dwight – background vocals, choir
- Tia Britt – background vocals, choir
- Vanessa Bryan – background vocals, choir
- William Washington – background vocals, choir

== Charts ==
Weekly chart performance for "Babylon" (original version)
Chart (2020)	Peak position
Greece International (IFPI Greece)	77
Portugal (AFP)	136
UK Audio Streaming (Official Charts Company)	97
US Hot Dance/Electronic Songs (Billboard)	17

Weekly chart performance for "Babylon" (Haus Labs version)
Chart (2021)	Peak position
US Hot Dance/Electronic Songs (Billboard)	30
