= Chester Lockhart =

American actor and musician

- Born: Riverside, California, U.S.
- Occupations: Musician; actor

Chester Lockhart (born 1997) is an American musician and actor.

== Early life ==
Lockhart was born on April 3 in Riverside County, California. Their mother is from South Korea, and their father is of Danish heritage. Lockhart grew up in a very Christian household.

== Career ==
Lockhart has been described as an actor, dancer, and musician, and as a "California alt-pop artist".

Lockhart had a small part in the original cut of the 2013 film The Purge, but did not make it into the theatrical release.

In 2018, Lockhart released a video for a cover version of "I Put a Spell on You". They were featured in the music video for Taylor Swift's "You Need to Calm Down" in 2019.

In July 2020, Lockhart joined Monique Heart, Jay Jurden, and Patrick Rogers in hosting The Rearview podcast by Grindr and the Forever Dog Network, a queer roundtable where each week, all four hosts and a guest come together to discuss pop culture, sex, dating, and politics. On September 16, 2020, Lockhart released an EP titled Wet Metal, taking on a hyperpop sound.

In 2021, Lockhart created a satirical parody talkshow titled Girlboss Today which critiques queerphobic elements of Christianity as well as rainbow capitalism. The series is broadcast live on Lockhart's Twitch channel, Lockhart plays a wine-loving Karen character that is obsessed with being an independent business owner.

On September 3, 2021, Lockhart appeared on Lady Gaga's Dawn of Chromatica album, remixing "Sine from Above" featuring Elton John along with Mood Killer and Lil Texas. The remix peaked at number 39 on the Billboard Hot Dance/Electronic Songs chart.

In November 2021, Lockhart directed Rina Sawayama's Dynasty Tour in the United Kingdom and Ireland, as well as choreographed the music video for "My Agenda" by Dorian Electra.

== Personal life ==
Lockhart identifies as queer, uses singular they pronouns as well as she, and described themselves as non-binary.

== Discography ==
=== Extended plays ===
Title	Details
Wet Metal	Released: September 16, 2020

=== Singles ===
Title	Year	Album
"Kiss"	2016	non-album singles
"Save Me from Myself"	2017	non-album singles
"In Loving Memory"	2018	non-album singles
"Spell on You"	2018	non-album singles
"The Night"	2019	non-album singles
"Cry"	2020	Wet Metal
"Bound"	2020	Wet Metal
"Our God Is an Awesome God"	2021	TBA
"Firework"	2021	TBA

=== Other charted songs ===
Title	Year	Peak chart positions	Album
Title	Year	US Dance	Album
"Sine from Above" (Chester Lockhart, Mood Killer, and Lil Texas Remix)	2021	39	Dawn of Chromatica

== Filmography ==
=== Television ===
Year	Title	Role	Notes
2018	RuPaul's Drag Race	Sonny Bono	Episode: "The Unauthorized Rusical"
2019	Into the Dark	Zachary	Episode: "Midnight Kiss"
2019	Glamorous	Dizmal	TV movie
2020	Shameless	Cole	Episode: "Now Leaving Illinois"
