= Doss (musician) =

American electronic musician (born 1990)

- Born: 1990 (age 35–36)
- Origin: New York City, New York, U.S.
- Genres: Dream trance; electro house; techno; shoegaze; downtempo; electroclash; chiptune
- Occupations: Musician; singer; songwriter; record producer; DJ
- Labels: LuckyMe; Acéphale
- Website: doss.world

Doss (born 1990) is an American musician, singer, songwriter, record producer, and DJ from New York City.

== Career ==
Doss began releasing music under her stage name in 2012 with a remix of the song "& It Was U" by How to Dress Well, as well as a remix of Wildarms' "Full Hearts" in 2013. After signing to Acéphale Records in 2014, Doss released her eponymous debut EP, which received critical acclaim among online music publications. The single release of "The Way I Feel" from the EP featured four new remixes from Recycle Culture, Ana Caprix, and PC Music act Life Sim.

Doss took a hiatus from releasing original music until 2021, returning with the song "Puppy" as the lead single of her second EP 4 New Hit Songs. The EP landed on numerous "Best Of" end of the year lists. Doss also contributed to Lady Gaga's third remix album Dawn of Chromatica with a remix of "Enigma". In November 2021, she released a Spotify-exclusive song titled "Cherry" with vocal contributions from Cecilia Gault.

In 2022, Doss released a new song titled "Jumpin". In October of the same year, she released an accompanying remix EP to 4 New Hit Songs, featuring contributions from Rye Rye, Hudson Mohawke, and Plush.

== Discography ==
=== Extended plays ===
Title	Details
Doss	Released: April 29, 2014; Label: Acéphale; Format: LP, digital download
4 New Hit Songs	Released: May 7, 2021; Label: LuckyMe; Format: LP, digital download
4 New Hit Songs *Remixes	Released: October 26, 2022; Label: LuckyMe, Duet; Format: Digital download

=== Singles ===
Title	Year	Album
"The Way I Feel"	2014	Doss
"Here Tonight"	2014	Doss
"Puppy"	2021	4 New Hit Songs
"Look"	2021	4 New Hit Songs
"Strawberry"	2021	4 New Hit Songs
"On Your Mind"	2021	4 New Hit Songs
"Cherry"	2021	Non-album single
"Jumpin'"	2022	TBA
"Drugs"	2023	TBA

=== Remixes ===
Title	Year	Artist
"& It Was U" (Doss Remix)	2012	How to Dress Well
"Full Hearts" (Doss Remix)	2013	Wildarms
"I Can’t Control Myself" (Doss Remix)	2015	Strange Names
"Whole New World" (Sophie & Doss Remix)	2019	Sophie
"For Now" (Doss Remix)	2021	Zsela
"Airhead" (Doss Remix)	2021	A. G. Cook
"Enigma" (Doss Remix)	2021	Lady Gaga
"High Tide" (Doss Remix)	2022	Eartheater
"Bunny Is a Rider" (Doss Remix)	2023	Caroline Polachek
"Underground (Doss Remix)	2024	f5ve
