= Dawn of Chromatica =

2021 remix album by Lady Gaga

Remix album by Lady Gaga
- Released: September 3, 2021
- Genres: Pop; hyperpop
- Length: 49:49
- Labels: Streamline; Interscope
- Producers: BloodPop (executive producer); Lsdxoxo; Coucou Chloe; Arca; Clarence Clarity; Brabo; A. G. Cook; Oscar Scheller; Mura Masa; Doss; Dorian Electra; Count Baldor; Chris Greatti; Chester Lockhart; Mood Killer; Lil Texas; Planningtorock; Jimmy Edgar; Tchami

Lady Gaga chronology
Chromatica (2020)	Dawn of Chromatica (2021)	Love for Sale (2021)

Dawn of Chromatica is the third remix album by American singer-songwriter Lady Gaga, released on September 3, 2021, by Streamline and Interscope Records. Consisting of remixes of songs from Gaga's sixth studio album, Chromatica (2020), the album was executive produced by BloodPop and embraces an underground and hyperpop-influenced sound. Gaga conceived the project as a way to highlight emerging artists and producers. It features collaborations with numerous pop and electronic musicians, including Arca, Rina Sawayama, Pabllo Vittar, Charli XCX, Ashnikko, Shygirl, Dorian Electra and Bree Runway, while retaining the contributions of Ariana Grande, Blackpink, and Elton John from the original album.

Dawn of Chromatica received generally favorable reviews from music critics, who highlighted its experimental production and use of alternative electronic styles. Commercially, it peaked at number 66 on the US Billboard 200, while topping the Dance/Electronic Albums chart. It also charted in several international territories, including Australia, New Zealand, Greece, and Hungary.

== Background and development ==
On March 2, 2020, American singer Lady Gaga announced that her sixth album, Chromatica, would be released on April 10. The album was later postponed due to the COVID-19 pandemic, though it was eventually released on May 29. On April 4, 2021, the album's executive producer BloodPop teased the possibility of a Chromatica remix album, asking fans online to suggest artists they would like to see featured on the project. He later replied to his tweet and tagged Japanese-British musician Rina Sawayama, who responded with a smirking emoji. BloodPop also confirmed that he was working with British musician Charli XCX on a remix of the album's third single "911". He also revealed that the project would include an early version of "Babylon" that was previously used in an advertisement for Gaga's cosmetics brand Haus Laboratories.

On May 8, 2021, BloodPop revealed on Twitter that American musician Dorian Electra would appear on the album. Electra later said that being invited to contribute to the project was exciting but also somewhat daunting due to concerns about how Gaga's fanbase might react. They explained that the remix went through multiple versions as they worked to create something that would appeal to both their own audience and Gaga's fans. During an interview at the 2021 Brit Awards, Sawayama discussed the project, stating that "The wish is on the internet, and I've done my bit, let's just say that. So, it's in the works", while hinting that she was featured on "Free Woman". Earlier in March, during a Q&A on Twitter, Charli XCX revealed that BloodPop had previously contacted her about contributing to a remix of "911", though a communication error meant she had not initially received the song's stems. The issue was later clarified by the producer, and XCX confirmed in May that work on the remix had begun.

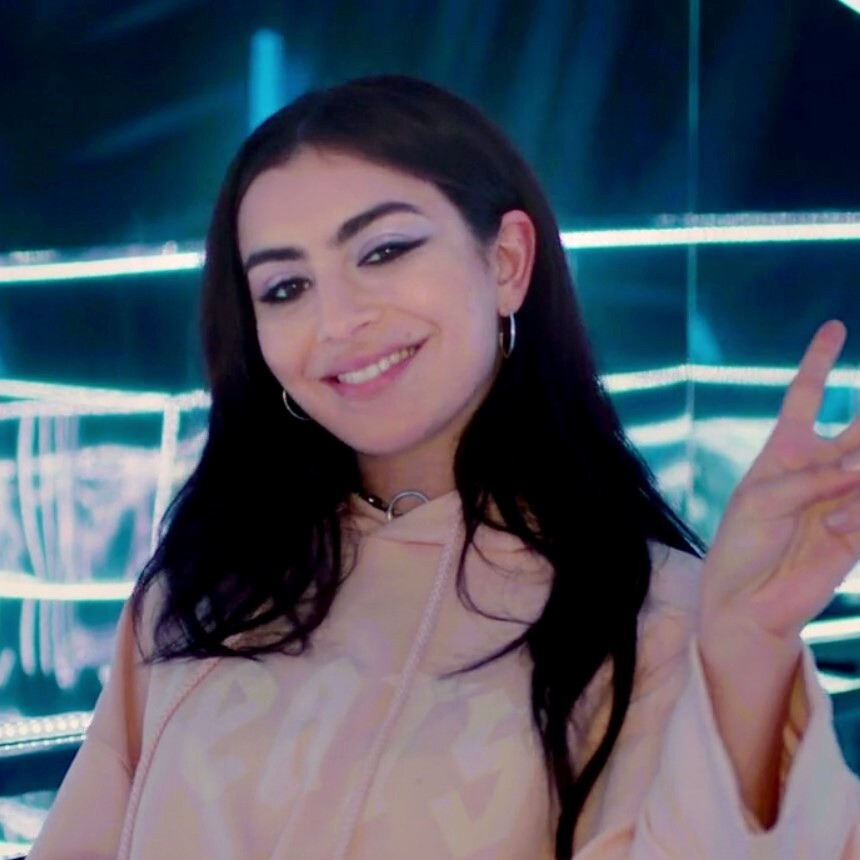
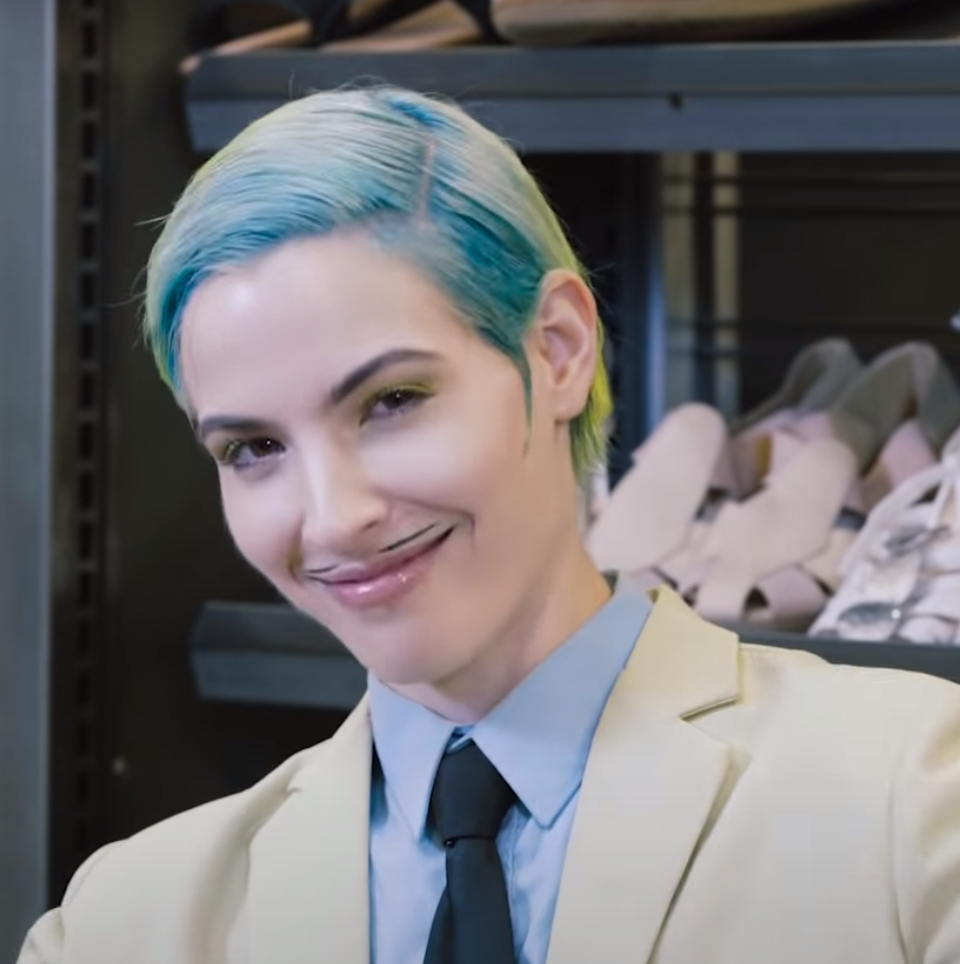
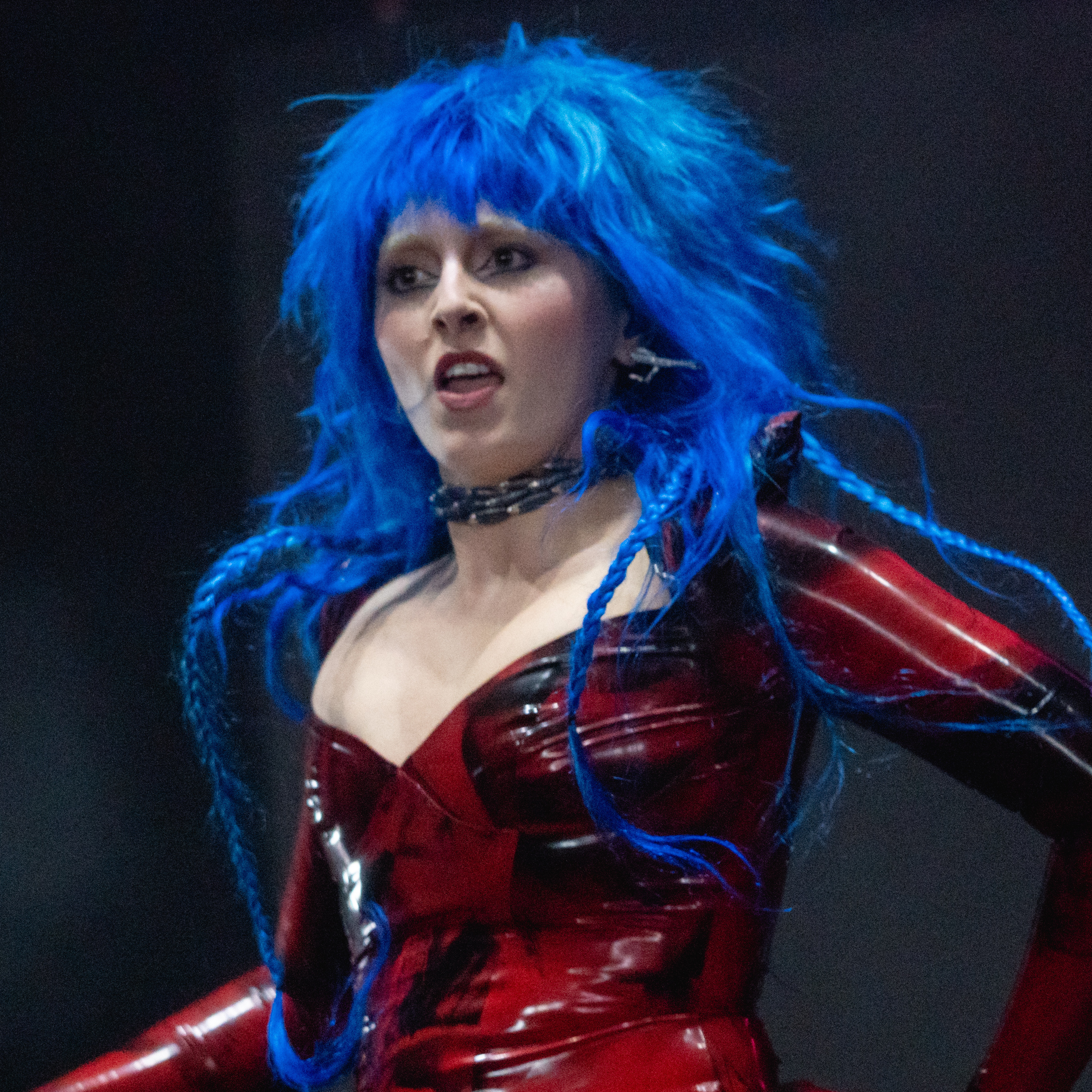
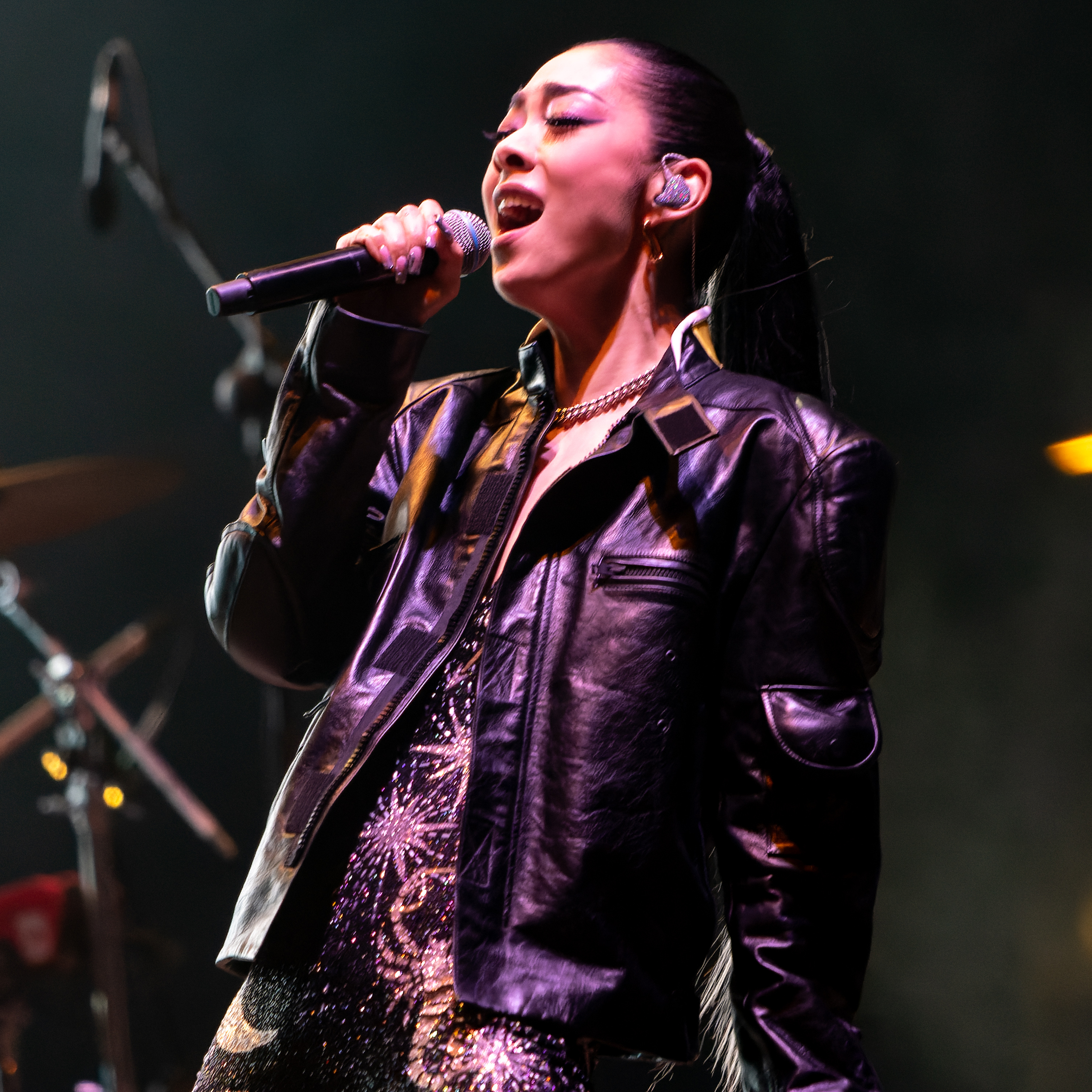
Singers who contributed vocals to the remix album include Charli XCX, Dorian Electra, Rina Sawayama, and Ashnikko (clockwise, from top left).

Additional collaborators were gradually revealed throughout 2021. British musician Bree Runway said during an interview on The Jonathan Ross Show in May that she was involved with the project, later announcing in August that she would appear on a remix of "Babylon" by tweeting out its lyrics. Runway later explained that she had chosen the song herself and delayed writing her verse for several weeks because she feared disappointing Gaga, whom she considered one of her idols. On August 10, Gaga acknowledged the remix project publicly for the first time, describing it as "so f*cking fuego" in a tweet. American singer and rapper Ashnikko confirmed her involvement with the project by responding to Gaga's post. She later explained that BloodPop had invited her to participate and that she recorded her remix of "Plastic Doll" with producer Oscar Scheller while the pair were in Mexico, improvising a vocal booth by singing under a duvet. A snippet of the remix was teased by RuPaul's Drag Race winner Aquaria during a DJ set in the weeks leading up to the album's announcement.

Around the same period, Brazilian singer and drag queen Pabllo Vittar hinted that she would be featured on a remix of "Fun Tonight", while American producer Lil Texas confirmed his involvement by posting a snippet of his remix of "Sine from Above". The latter track was later revealed to have been reworked by producers Chester Lockhart, Mood Killer and Lil Texas, who were contacted by BloodPop and asked to complete the remix within two days. After agreeing to take part, the trio divided the production between them, each handling different sections of the track, with Lockhart producing the opening portion, Mood Killer reworking Elton John's part, and Lil Texas completing the final segment. The producers cited the orchestral elements and vivid imagery in the lyrics of the original track as inspirations, alongside saxophones and circus-style instrumentation, while also drawing influence from Gaga's 2014 single "G.U.Y.".

Other contributors included British musician Shygirl, who later revealed that she became involved in the project through BloodPop despite not knowing Gaga personally. She said she specifically requested to remix "Sour Candy", describing it as the best fit for her style. While Shygirl loved the original track, she felt it only hinted at its full potential. She collaborated with producer Mura Masa on the remix, marking her first time working on an official remix release. Venezuelan producer Arca also revealed to her Discord fan server that she had remixed Chromatica's second single "Rain on Me", which features American singer Ariana Grande.

In July 2021, Canadian producer and singer Grimes disclosed that she had produced remixes of the three interludes featured on Chromatica. She mentioned that she had initially missed the deadline to submit them to the record label, but speculated that due to the project's delay there might still be time for them to be included. However, when the album was officially announced on August 30, her remixes were absent from the final tracklist.

== Composition ==
Dawn of Chromatica contains mainly underground pop and hyperpop sound. It opens with two songs described by Clash as "dancefloor bumpers": "Alice", remixed by Berlin-based Philadelphian rapper and producer Lsdxoxo, and "Stupid Love", remixed by the French producer Coucou Chloe. The latter strips away the single's bubblegum beats, replacing the production with a moodier, "macabre midnight romp". Arca's remix of "Rain on Me" follows as the third track; she introduces synths in the song and samples the songs "Time" and "Mequetrefe" off her fourth studio album Kick I (2020), as well as the changa tuki track "Mételo Sácalo" by DJ Yirvin. Rina Sawayama and English producer Clarence Clarity's remix of "Free Woman" incorporates metal influences with wailing riffs and drum fills reminiscent of Gaga's 2011 album Born This Way, with Sawayama opening the track by saying "Let's go Gaga". Pablo Vittar's reimagination of "Fun Tonight" incorporates elements of Brazilian music, including accordion and zabumba percussion, reflecting her electronic forró influences.

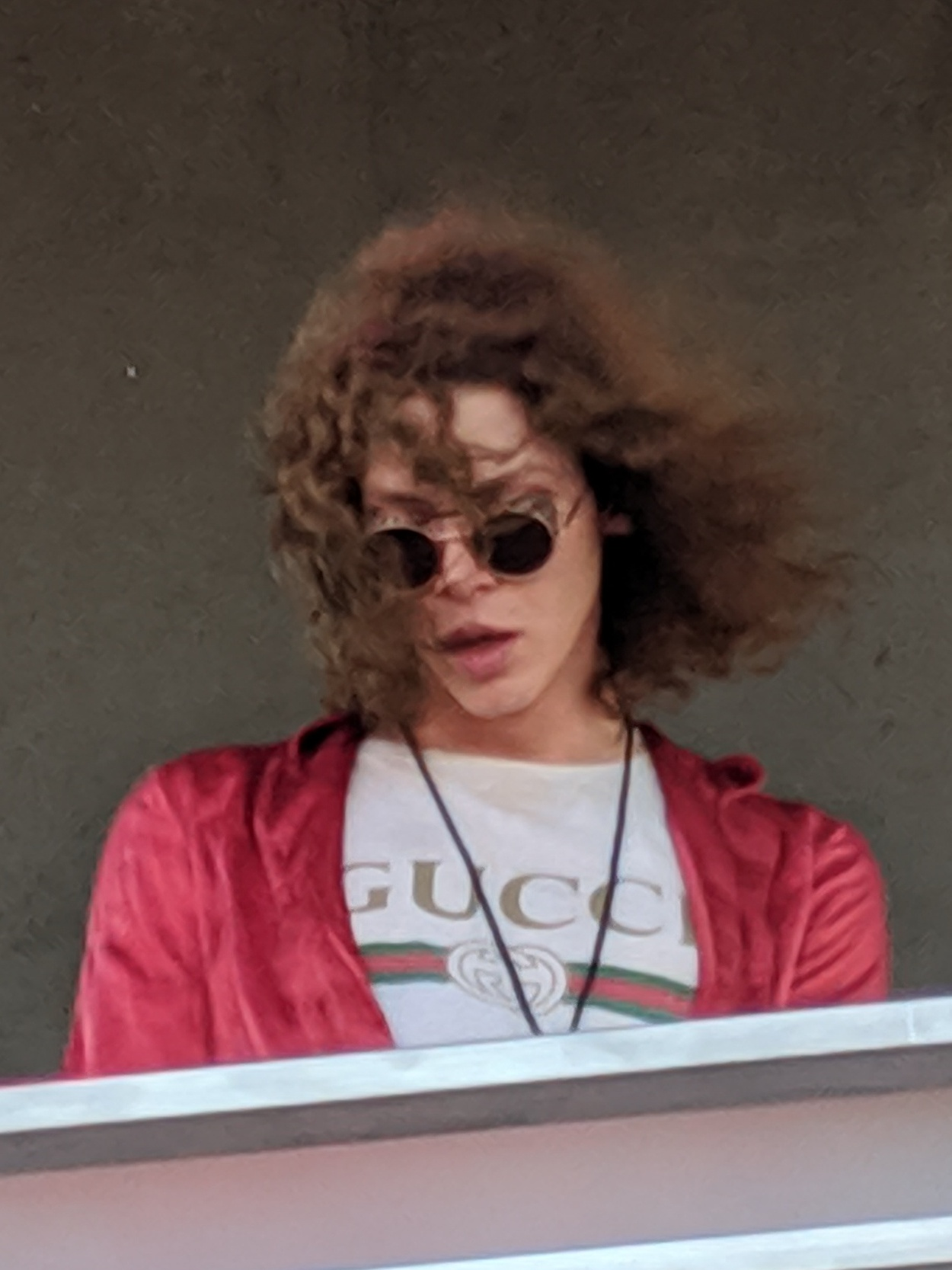
Scottish musician Sophie's work with Gaga remained unreleased, though her impact on Dawn of Chromatica was noted.

The Charli XCX and A. G. Cook remix of "911" gives a "transcendental" sound to the original version, with an overly distorted chorus and a new verse with lines such as "I look out to Venus and search for a place / And search for a place / And sometimes I hate myself" and "If it's all getting way harder / Turn it up, party to Gaga". Ashnikko remixed "Plastic Doll" into a trap version, altering the song's mid-tempo composition. "Sour Candy", featuring South Korean girl group Blackpink, receives a club version by Shygirl and the Guernsey producer Mura Masa, and includes metallic sound effects. The remix retains the vocal contributions of Blackpink members Rosé and Lisa while removing those of Jennie and Jisoo. The album continues with an EDM remix of "Enigma" by American producer Doss, featuring "pulsating drops". Dorian Electra's remix of "Replay" is influenced by metal and features "dramatic vocals" and "menacing growls".

The "Sine from Above" remix incorporates distorted bass, glitched trap, drum and bass, cartoonish sound samples, and a saxophone solo, before concluding with hardstyle elements. English musician Planningtorock transforms "1000 Doves" into a new wave-inspired track with house influence. The album closes with two versions of "Babylon": a "throbbing techno revamp" featuring Bree Runway and American producer Jimmy Edgar, alongside the "sledgehammering" Haus Labs version. In the former, Runway contributes lines that reference earlier works in Gaga's catalogue ("Just dance, Bree, it'll be okay/Don't act up with your poker face"). Runway's additional vocal harmonies complement both Gaga's lead and the surrounding choral arrangement, while Edgar enhances the production through more forceful rhythmic elements and pronounced beat drops.

Although BloodPop had previously teased potential releases of Gaga's collaborations with late Scottish producer Sophie that were scrapped from the original album, none of the songs appear on Dawn of Chromatica. Sam Murphy of Junkee nevertheless observed Sophie's influence on the album's futuristic pop sound, arguing that many of the contributing artists reflect the hyperpop movement associated with her work. The producers of the "Sine from Above" remix also highlighted her impact. Mood Killer stated that Sophie's "presence is all over the remix album", while Chesther Lockhart added that "many of the sounds and the forward-thinking-ness and the ability to use electronic instruments in a different way is inspired by Sophie's impact on this underground electronic music scene over the past decade."

== Release and promotion ==
Dawn of Chromatica was officially announced on August 30, 2021, and released on September 3, on streaming and digital download formats. Its CD was released on November 19, while the vinyl was released on February 4, 2022. The album cover is a reimagined version of the original Chromatica artwork, replacing its palette with vivid green and pink tones. Slant Magazine described it as "garish" and "cluttered". The visual redesign was created by Team Rolfes, a digital art and 3D‑animation studio led by brothers Sam and Andy Rolfes. Known for their use of motion capture and abstract digital imagery, the studio frequently blends surreal, exaggerated forms with immersive virtual environments.

"I love young artists and support them. All of them on the album have something to say, and they performed their hearts out."

— Lady Gaga to The Wall Street Journal

Upon release, executive producer BloodPop described Dawn of Chromatica as a continuation of the themes surrounding Chromatica, stating that while the original album was released "at the beginning of a global pandemic, a shred of light for many in a dark time", Dawn of Chromatica represented "the soundtrack to the sunrise after that long night", highlighting contributions from "forward-thinking artists" around the world. Discussing the project, Entertainment Weekly writer Marcus Jones observed that while remix albums typically serve as celebrations of the original artist's work, Gaga used Dawn of Chromatica to "spotlight some of the recent pop talent that's blossomed in her image."

On the release day, Gaga posted a video of herself with cartoon filters through her social media. It included a snippet from the breakdown of the "Sine from Above" remix, along with a message encouraging her followers to "smile and dance through the pain". In a further Twitter post, she invited her followers to celebrate the album's artists "who see the world, feel the world, and put that feeling into something bigger than all of us: music." Several of the contributing musicians later incorporated their Dawn of Chromatica remixes into their live performances, including Rina Sawayama, Shygirl, Bree Runway, Dorian Electra, Pabllo Vittar, and Coucou Chloe.

== Critical reception ==
Professional ratings
Aggregate scores
Source	Rating
Metacritic	74/100
Review scores
Source	Rating
AllMusic	4/5 stars
Clash	8/10
Pitchfork	6.7/10
Slant Magazine	2.5/5 stars
Tom Hull – on the Web	B+

Dawn of Chromatica received generally positive reviews from critics. According to Metacritic, which assigns a normalized rating out of 100 to reviews from mainstream critics, Dawn of Chromatica received a score of 74 based on four reviews, indicating "generally favorable reviews".

Neil Z. Yeung of AllMusic called the album "the daring and liberated sibling" to Chromatica, featuring "wild, sometimes noisy, and always thrilling reimaginings." Robin Murray of Clash described it as "brilliantly entertaining", writing that the remix compilation showcases Gaga's ability as "a cultural curator" and calling her "one of this generation's few – only – true interstellar pop talents". Sam Murphy of Junkee felt the album "unlocks the thrilling potential of the original", adding that it is "noisy and garish" but exciting for placing Gaga in a sonic space "uninhibited by what is happening in the mainstream". Wolfgang Ruth of Vulture wrote that the album is "filled with sliving remixes containing sliving features" and described it as "next level".

Jamieson Cox of Pitchfork wrote that the album is "less a wall-to-wall collection of club bangers than an expansion of the Chromatica cinematic universe," suggesting it feels "less like a celebration of a world-beating record and more like passing the torch." Tom Hull described the album as "beats sharpened, persona reduced", comparing it to "a filter that turns realistic photos into caricatures." Alexa Camp of Slant Magazine was more critical, writing that the album is "a mixed bag, swinging wildly between microgenres and quality from track to track", with some remixes sounding "noisy or just plain tuneless".

=== Retrospective commentary ===
In 2025, Solomon Pace-McCarrick of Dazed included Dawn of Chromatica among the ten best remix albums of all time, writing that it "proved the superstar was still able to stay ahead of music trends". In 2026, Craig Jenskins of Vulture credited Gaga with helping revive the pop remix album as a form of "holdover drop", noting that Dawn of Chromatica was released during the two-year pandemic delay before The Chromatica Ball (2022). Contrasting it with her earlier The Fame Monster remix release, The Remix (2010), which he characterized as more functional club material tied to her debut-era success, Jenkins argued that Dawn of Chromatica helped reposition remix albums as a route toward wider cultural visibility, later reflected in projects like Brat and It's Completely Different but Also Still Brat (2024) by Charli XCX, Fancy Some More? (2025) by PinkPantheress, and Midnight Sun: Girls Trip (2026) by Zara Larsson. In a retrospective review of Gaga's discography the same year, Al Shipley of Spin argued that Dawn of Chromatica's hyperpop-inspired remixes were a natural extension of Gaga's influence on the genre and that their "busier, noisier" sound matched Chromatica's cyberpunk aesthetic better than the original album's more conventional pop production.

== Commercial performance ==
In the United States, Dawn of Chromatica debuted at number 66 on the Billboard 200 chart with 11,000 album-equivalent units, while topping the Dance/Electronic Albums chart. This made Gaga tie the record for the most cumulative number one dance albums and extend her record as the artist with the most cumulative weeks at number one (at 211 weeks). She also became the first artist in history to occupy the top four positions in a single week, with Dawn of Chromatica, Born This Way (2011), The Fame (2008), and Chromatica (2020), respectively.

The album later returned to the top ten of the Dance/Electronic Albums chart following the release of additional physical formats. Its CD release in November 2021 propelled the album back to number five on the chart with 3,200 equivalent album units. The vinyl release in February 2022 prompted another re-entry, with the album reaching number six after earning 2,700 equivalent album units, including 2,300 from physical sales—2,200 of which were vinyl. The album's performance also helped Gaga secure the titles of Billboard's Top Dance/Electronic Artist and Top Dance/Electronic Albums Artist of 2021 on the publication's year-end charts.

Internationally, the album achieved moderate chart success across several territories. In Australia, it reached number 31, marking the second time a Lady Gaga remix album charted within the country's top 50, following 2010's The Remix. It also reached the top 40 in Greece and Hungary, peaking at numbers 39 and 38, respectively. Elsewhere, the album charted in multiple European countries, including Scotland (26) Ireland (45) Italy (49) and the United Kingdom (56), while also appearing on the charts in the Netherlands, Spain, France, Lithuania, Japan, and New Zealand.

== Track listing ==
Dawn of Chromatica track listing
No.	Title	Writer(s)	Remixer(s)	Length
1.	"Alice" (Lsdxoxo remix)	Axel Hedfors; Johannes Klahr; Justin Tranter; Michael Tucker; Stefani Germanotta	Lsdxoxo	2:40
2.	"Stupid Love" (Coucou Chloe remix)	Ely Weisfield; Karl Martin Sandberg; Martin Joseph Léonard Bresso; Tucker; Germanotta	Coucou Chloe	2:36
3.	"Rain on Me" (Arca remix; with Ariana Grande)	Alexander Ridha; Ariana Grande; Betty Wright; Jeremiah Burden; Lynn Williams; Bresso; Matthew Burns; Tucker; Nija Charles; Rami Yacoub; Germanotta	Arca	4:23
4.	"Free Woman" (Rina Sawayama and Clarence Clarity remix)	Ridha; Hedfors; Klahr; Tucker; Germanotta; Rina Sawayama	Clarence Clarity	3:53
5.	"Fun Tonight" (Pabllo Vittar remix)	Burns; Tucker; Yacoub; Germanotta	Brabo	2:20
6.	"911" (Charli XCX and A. G. Cook remix)	Hugo Pierre Leclercq; Tranter; Tucker; Germanotta; Charlotte Aitchison^{[a]}; A. G. Cook^{[a]}	A. G. Cook	4:13
7.	"Plastic Doll" (Ashnikko remix)	Jacob "JKash" Hindlin; Tucker; Yacoub; Sonny Moore; Germanotta; Ashnikko^{[a]}; Oscar Scheller^{[a]}	Oscar Scheller	2:29
8.	"Sour Candy" (Shygirl and Mura Masa remix; with Blackpink)	Madison Emiko Love; Burns; Tucker; Park Hong-jun; Yacoub; Germanotta; Shygirl^{[a]}	Mura Masa	3:45
9.	"Enigma" (Doss remix)	Hindlin; Burns; Tucker; Germanotta	Doss	4:29
10.	"Replay" (Dorian Electra remix)	Burns; Tucker; Nick Ashford; Yacoub; Germanotta; Valerie Simpson	Dorian Electra; Count Baldor; Chris Greatti	3:49
11.	"Sine from Above" (Chester Lockhart, Mood Killer and Lil Texas remix; with Elton John)	Hedfors; Benjamin Rice; Elton John; Klahr; Burns; Tucker; Yacoub; Richard Zastenker; Ryan Tedder; Salem Al Fakir; Sebastian Ingrosso; Germanotta; Vincent Ponte	Chester Lockhart; Mood Killer; Lil Texas	4:10
12.	"1000 Doves" (Planningtorock remix)	Bresso; Tucker; Yacoub; Germanotta	Planningtorock	5:05
13.	"Babylon" (Bree Runway and Jimmy Edgar remix)	Burns; Tucker; Germanotta; Bresso; Brenda Mensah	Jimmy Edgar	2:48
14.	"Babylon" (Haus Labs version)	Germanotta; Tucker; Bresso; Burns^{[a]}	BloodPop; Tchami	3:01
Total length:				49:41

=== Notes ===
- ^{^[a]} signifies a songwriter that is only listed on physical editions of the album.
- "Rain on Me" samples "All This Love That I'm Givin'", written by Jeremiah Burden, Lynn Williams and Betty Wright, performed by Gwen McCrae.
- "Replay" samples "It's My House", written by Nickolas Ashford and Valerie Simpson, performed by Diana Ross.
- Vinyl edition does not include track 14.

== Personnel ==
Credits and personnel adapted from AllMusic.

=== Remixers, producers and vocal contributors ===
- A. G. Cook – primary artist, programming, remix engineer
- Arca – primary artist, remix engineer
- Ashnikko – primary artist, vocals
- BloodPop – remix engineer, executive producer
- Bree Runway – primary artist, vocals
- Charli XCX – primary artist, vocals
- Chester Lockhart – primary artist, remix engineer, mixing
- Chris Greatti – remix engineer
- Clarence Clarity – primary artist, programming, remix engineer
- Coucou Chloe – primary artist, remix engineer, engineer
- Count Baldor – remix engineer
- Dorian Electra – primary artist, remix engineer, vocals
- Doss – primary artist, remix engineer, mixing
- Jimmy Edgar – primary artist, remix engineer, mixing
- Lil Texas – primary artist, remix engineer
- LSDXOXO – primary artist, remix engineer
- Mood Killer – primary artist, remix engineer
- Mura Masa – primary artist, programming, remix engineer, mixing, engineer, mastering engineer
- Oscar Scheller – remix engineer
- Pabllo Vittar – primary artist, remix engineer, vocals
- Planningtorock – primary artist, remix engineer, vocals, drums, keyboards, engineer
- Rina Sawayama – primary artist, vocals, background vocals, composer
- Shygirl – primary artist, vocals
- Tchami – remix engineer

=== Technical ===
- Geoff Swan – mixing
- Hector Fernandez – engineering
- John Greenham – mastering engineer
- Lars Stalfors – mixing
- Marta Salogni – mixing
- Rafael Fadul – mixing
- Rob Murray – mastering engineer
- Thomas Slinger – mixing
- Tom Norris – mixing

=== Musicians ===
- Maffalda – drums
- Rodrigo Gorky – synthesizer
- Will Bone – horn
- William Santos – accordion
- Zebu – bass, guitar

=== Original artists and songwriters ===
- Lady Gaga – primary artist, vocals, composer
- Ariana Grande – primary artist, composer
- Axwell – composer
- Benjamin Rice – composer
- Betty Wright – composer
- Blackpink – primary artist, vocals
- Boys Noize – composer
- Brenda Mensah – composer
- Elton John – primary artist, composer
- Ely Weisfeld – composer
- Hugo Leclercq – composer
- Jacob Kasher – composer
- Jeremiah Burden – composer
- Johannes Klahr – composer
- Justin Tranter – composer
- Lynn Williams – composer
- Madison Love – composer
- Martin Bresso – composer
- Matthew Burns – composer
- Max Martin – composer
- Michael Tucker – composer
- Nick Ashford – composer
- Nija Charles – composer
- Park Hong-Jun – composer
- Rami Yacoub – composer
- Richard Zastenker – composer
- Ryan Tedder – composer
- Salem Al Fakir – composer
- Sebastian Ingrosso – composer
- Sonny Moore – composer
- Valerie Simpson – composer
- Vincent Ponte – composer

== Charts ==
Weekly chart performance for Dawn of Chromatica
Chart (2021–2022)	Peak position
Australian Albums (ARIA)	31
Belgian Albums (Ultratop Flanders)	67
Belgian Albums (Ultratop Wallonia)	85
Canadian Albums (Billboard)	89
Dutch Albums (Album Top 100)	97
French Albums (SNEP)	108
Greek Albums (IFPI)	39
Hungarian Albums (MAHASZ)	38
Irish Albums (Official Charts)	45
Italian Albums (FIMI)	49
Japanese Albums (Oricon)	279
Lithuanian Albums (AGATA)	72
New Zealand Albums (RMNZ)	32
Scottish Albums (Official Charts)	26
Spanish Albums (Promusicae)	71
UK Albums (Official Charts)	56
US Billboard 200	66
US Top Dance Albums (Billboard)	1

== Release history ==
Release dates and formats for Dawn of Chromatica
Region	Date	Format(s)	Label	Ref.
Various	September 3, 2021	Digital download; streaming	Interscope	
Various	November 19, 2021	CD	Interscope	
Various	February 4, 2022	Vinyl	Interscope	
