= Sine from Above =

2020 song by Lady Gaga and Elton John

Song by Lady Gaga and Elton John

from the album Chromatica
- Studio: Henson (Hollywood, California)
- Genre: Electropop; EDM
- Length: 4:04
- Label: Interscope
- Songwriters: Lady Gaga; BloodPop; Elton John; Axel Hedfors; Johannes Klahr; Rami Yacoub; Richard Zastenker; Ryan Tedder; Sebastian Ingrosso; Benjamin Rice; Vincent Ponte; Salem Al Fakir
- Producers: BloodPop; Burns; Axwell; Liohn; Klahr

Audio video
- "Sine from Above" on YouTube

"Sine from Above" is a song by American singer Lady Gaga and English musician Elton John from the former's sixth studio album, Chromatica (2020). It is included as the album's fourteenth track, and is preceded by a string arrangement, "Chromatica III", which leads right into the beginning of the song. It was produced by BloodPop, Burns, Axwell, Liohn and Johannes Klahr, and had a wide array of songwriters involved. It is an electronica-influenced electropop song with a drum n' bass breakdown, and lyrically it talks about the healing power of music.

Several music critics found "Sine from Above" one of Chromatica's standouts and appreciated its experimental nature, whereas some others were critical of the breakdown of the track and the use of vocal effects on John's voice. The song had minor chart placements in a few countries, and in the United States it reached a peak position of number 14 on the Billboard Dance/Electronic Songs chart. Gaga sang a stripped-down version of "Sine from Above" in a Valentino campaign video, while a remix edit by Chester Lockhart, Mood Killer and Lil Texas appeared on her remix album, Dawn of Chromatica (2021).

== Background and recording ==
"Sine from Above" marks the second studio based collaboration between Lady Gaga and Elton John, following their duet "Hello, Hello", which appeared in the 2011 animated film Gnomeo & Juliet. The duo also performed together on numerous occasions, including the 52nd Annual Grammy Awards, where they performed a medley of Gaga's "Speechless" and John's "Your Song", and the Lady Gaga and the Muppets Holiday Spectacular television special, where they performed "Bennie and the Jets" and "Artpop". Gaga later professionally recorded John's "Your Song" for the 2018 tribute album Revamp.

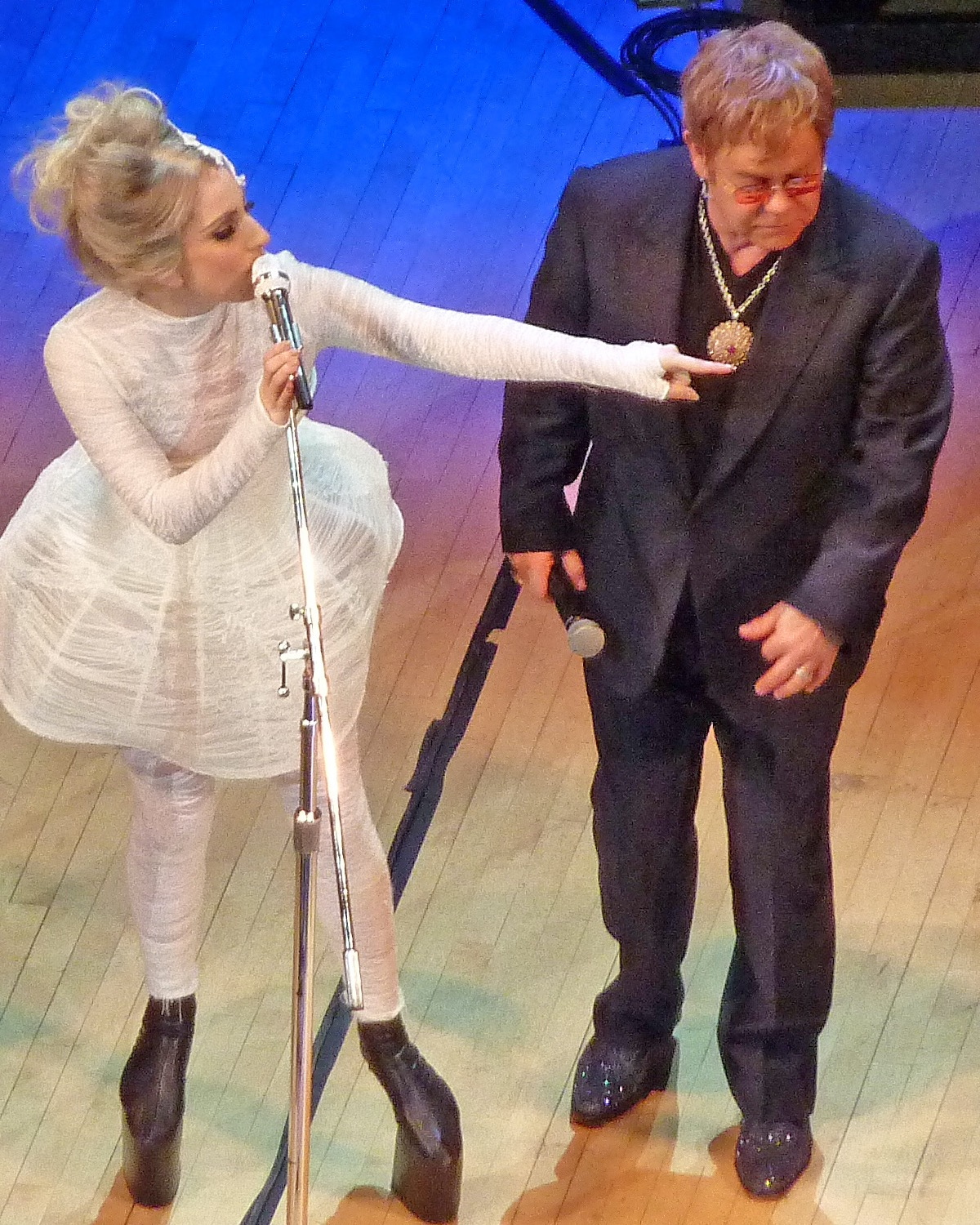
Co-producer Axwell came up with the idea of creating the song as a duet between Lady Gaga and Elton John (both pictured in 2010).

Gaga and John developed a long-time friendship, and Gaga referred to him as her "mentor for a long time". In an interview with Zane Lowe on Apple Music, Gaga talked about her work with John on "Sine from Above", and explained how he played a significant role in her road to recovery:

Elton's always really challenged me to take care of my artistry and to really take care of myself. And I really, really honour that about him. He is so, so uniquely special. And I cannot tell you how instrumental in my life he's been to showing me that you can go all the way in life and… be authentic and be you and do good things in the world and take care of yourself and be there.

"Sine from Above" was produced by BloodPop, Burns, Axwell, Liohn and Johannes Klahr, and had a wide array of songwriters involved. Axwell talked about how the song came about in an interview for Rolling Stone, stating: "I had this old song we worked on, like, seven years ago with Elton John. We tried working on it and we couldn't really get it where we wanted it. It was also kind of hard to get ahold of Elton John. I had this on my computer and was like, 'Wait a minute. Lady Gaga and Elton John are buddies.'" Axwell then sent the demo to Gaga and co-producer BloodPop who loved the track and decided to record it for Gaga's Chromatica (2020) album as a collaboration with John. He later added that the song was initially "a more chilled out, piano, acoustic thing. You can still hear that in the verses, and [the final version has] the same chord progression."

Talking about the recording of the song, co-producer Burns explained that John was on tour in Australia when they were in the process of finishing the song. As they had a close deadline to finish everything, the recording sessions took place via Skype, with Elton in a studio in Australia and the rest of them in Los Angeles. According to John, "Sine from Above" came in a period of his career when he wasn't keen to write any new songs with his long-term collaborator Bernie Taupin, and instead he featured on other musician's songs as a guest performer, "and went back a bit into being a session musician."

== Composition ==
"Sine from Above" is an electronica-influenced electropop track which includes trance synths and a drum-and-bass breakdown at the end of the song. Burns said that the ending was the singer's idea: "Originally, my first version had an 'Amen'-style break beat throughout it, but in the end, we opted for a four-to-the-floor rhythm. At the last minute, Gaga thought there should be some kind of crazy, jarring outro. She mentioned speeding it up, so I figured why not bring back the 'Amen' break, but in classic Jungle form." In an interview with American Songwriter, Gaga said "I wanted this song to have a range, where it began in a very organic, melodic way and then it ended in some sort of cacophony. A cacophony that I'm now comfortable with", claiming it is about resilience. According to the sheet music published on Musicnotes.com, the song is written in the time signature of common time, and is composed in the key of C minor with a tempo of 123 beats per minute, increasing to 150 in the outro. The vocals range from the tonal nodes of B♭_{3} to E♭_{5}.

Lyrically, the song talks about the healing power of music and Gaga's relationship with a higher power. Gaga explained the wordplay in the title as a reference to how music was an escape for her when she was in pain. She said: "S-I-N-E, because it's a sound wave. That sound, sine, from above is what healed me to be able to dance my way out of this album... That was later in the recording process that I actually was like, 'And now let me pay tribute to the very thing that has revived me, and that is music." The sine wave also appears on the cover art for Chromatica, and based on its lyrics Billboard considered "Sine from Above" to be "Gaga's mission statement for the album". In the interpretation of the Los Angeles Times' Mikael Wood, the track is "about feeling young when you're immortal."

=== "Chromatica III" ===
"Chromatica III"

Composition by Lady Gaga

from the album Chromatica
- Released: May 29, 2020
- Studio: Henson (Hollywood, California)
- Length: 0:27
- Songwriters: Lady Gaga; Morgan Kibby
- Producers: Kibby; Gaga

Audio video
- "Chromatica III" on YouTube

"Sine from Above" is one of the three songs on the Chromatica album which are preceded by an orchestral interlude, transitioning directly into the track, as Gaga wanted to emphasize the "cinematic" feeling of the record and felt that it had distinct acts. The preceding interlude, "Chromatica III" was composed by musician Morgan Kibby, who assembled a 26-person orchestra to record the string arrangement. Talking about the creating process, Kibby said:

"Chromatica III" started out as an arrangement under "Sine From Above". When we soloed the strings, BloodPop had the instinct that it should live as a distinct moment, so it became our foundation for "Chromatica III". After we parsed out part of the arrangement we all loved, he and Gaga, I believe, added the sounds of rain. The key piece of "III" for the strings was definitely the long note that sweeps and swells to honor the concept of a sine wave, and I think the additional production serves to highlight that idea.

While reviewing the album, Patrick Gomez of The A.V. Club called the piece an "unexpected highlight", and compared it to a Hans Zimmer score. "Chromatica III" was later featured in the music video for the song "911", playing in the background in a scene which shows Gaga crying after being involved in a car accident. Canadian singer and producer Grimes was set to remix the interlude for Dawn of Chromatica (2021), as well as "Chromatica I" and "Chromatica II"; however, her contributions did not make the final cut. The Chromatica Ball, Gaga's 2022 stadium tour, featured "Chromatica III" as an intro to the song "Babylon".

== Critical reception ==
"Sine from Above"
A 28-second sample of "Sine from Above", where Gaga and John's singing shifts to a drum and bass breakdown; a production choice which divided critics.

Nick Smith of MusicOMH thought that the collaboration was "rather inspired" and "perhaps the album's highlight". Brittany Spanos from Rolling Stone complimented the production as well as John's vocals saying "John's smooth, deep voice make him a perfect fit, making it sound like he's been gunning to become a disco vocalist for the entirety of his career." Hannah Mylrea from NME called the song "brilliantly bizarre" saying it "is basically what a heady night out at Glastonbury's Shangri La (Note: A popular live music and late-night area located in the south-east corner of the Glastonbury Festival site.) with Elton and Gaga would sound like". Writing for Pitchfork, Katherine St. Asaph found it one of the two strongest songs on the album, that "runs on WTF", and described it this way: "Imagine an axis from bizarro transcendence to pure transcendence; 'Sine from Above' is all the way at the left." Jem Aswad Variety thought that John gives a "stately vocal performance" as the sole male voice on the otherwise "very female and feminine" album. A Vulture article found "Sine from Above" "as grand a track as Gaga has ever recorded", and highlighted the "frenetic drum-and-bass breakdown that you wish went twice as long". Michael Cragg from The Guardian called the song "ludicrous", and opined that it "would win Eurovision on any given year." He underscored the "unexpected shift into cranium-rattling drum'n'bass, a fleeting taste of experimentation that feels oddly missing elsewhere [on the album]."

Stephen Daw of Billboard thought that the song "feels special", but called the final 30 seconds of the song "confusing" and "unnecessary", stating that "the effects laid over [Elton John's] voice falter as it slips into an uncanny valley." Sal Cinquemani of Slant Magazine thought that "Sine from Above" was the most experimental track on Chromatica with its sudden drum n' bass drop, but opined that it's "a trick Björk pulled off to more dramatic effect on her 2011 single 'Crystalline'." Patrick Gomez from The A.V. Club found it an "odd inclusion" on the album, saying that "[John's] vocals are unfortunately jarring when he comes in on the second verse, and there's something unharmonious about how their voices come together here." Simon K. from Sputnikmusic while complimented the production in the song, thought that the "track which once displayed real potential [is] completely stained by fundamental, asinine errors", and called John's contribution "godawful". Caryn Ganz of The New York Times deemed it "a shapeless E.D.M. disaster".

== Chart performance ==
In the Billboard issue dated June 13, 2020, "Sine from Above" debuted on the Bubbling Under Hot 100 Singles chart at number sixteen, and on the Hot Dance/Electronic Digital Songs at number fourteen. It was John's first ever appearance on the latter ranking. On the UK Singles Downloads Chart, compiled by the Official Charts Company (OCC), the song debuted at number 68 after the album's release, but four months later, in October, it reached a new peak of number 59. "Sine from Above" also peaked at number 93 in Australia, at number 200 in France, at number 94 in Greece, at number 109 in Portugal, at number 82 in Scotland, and at number 80 in Venezuela.

== Other versions ==
On September 17, 2020, a stripped-down version of "Sine from Above" was featured in the video campaign for Valentino's Voce Viva fragrance. Gaga appeared in the video singing the song along with a group of models. The video includes the motto "My voice, My strength" by Gaga, who explained why she chose "Sine from Above" for the campaign:

[It] is about the passion I feel, when I manifest the sounds that I hear in my head. They come in the form of song, messages, ideas, and love. This is my strength. These sounds are the function that form the basis of my voice. I hear them, and then I use them. They are how I live, how I love, how I prosper, and how I survive.

=== Remix ===
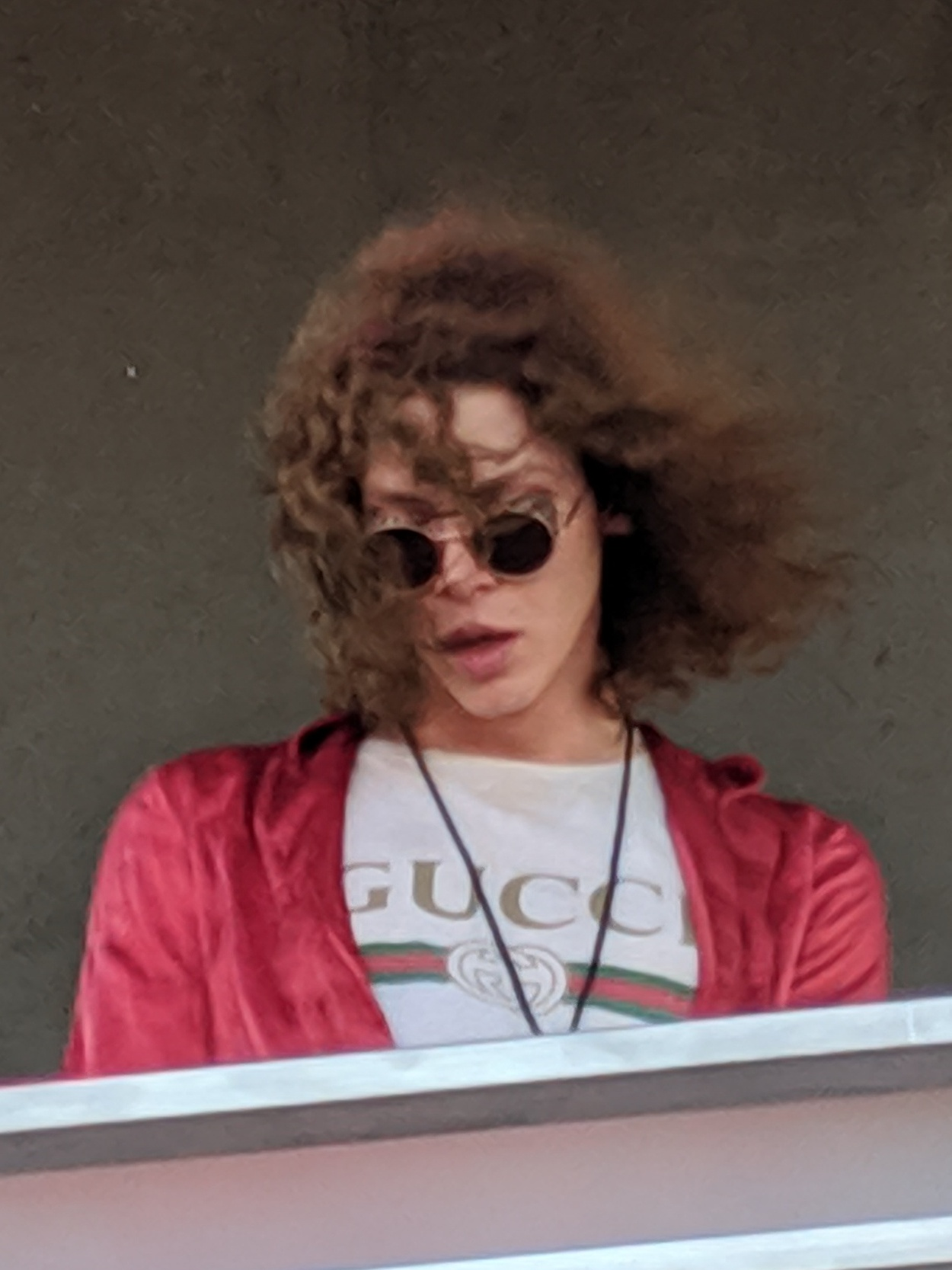
Scottish musician Sophie (pictured) was noted as a major influence on the remix.

For Gaga's third remix album, Dawn of Chromatica, "Sine from Above" was reimagined by Chester Lockhart, Mood Killer and Lil Texas. Lockhart was contacted by friend Bloodpop, who asked if the three of them would be willing to complete a remix in two days. After agreeing to take on the project, the trio distributed the task into three parts, with Lockhart handling the first minute and a half, Mood Killer doing John's part, and Lil Texas the final third of the track. Lil Texas said they intended to do the remix "the hardcore way", with Lockhart adding: "the song just gets crazier and crazier and crazier as it goes along. It starts off with a lot of energy and then it goes into clown circus demon territory magician. And then it becomes fully guillotine, just chop your whole head off at the end. And that's what a song should be." They were inspired by the orchestral moments and the use of imagery in the lyrics on the original album, saxophones and circus music, and Gaga's 2014 single "G.U.Y.". They also noted the impact of Scottish music producer Sophie on their work, saying that all of them are "a huge fan of hers and she's an idol to so many of us."

The remix was described as "dubstep-meets-punk" by Entertainment Weekly's Joey Nolfi, while Pitchfork's Jamieson Cox found "a bit of Artpop in its flatulent digital provocation." It features distorted bass, glitched trap, drum & bass, thunder strikes, cartoonish sound samples, a saxophone solo and finishes with hardstyle music. Neil Z. Yeung of AllMusic thought it was the "most chaotic remix" on the record with "a crushing breakdown that finally delivers on the surprise drum'n'bass outro of the original." Paper Mag's Hilton Dresden called it "an amazing remix", with "a lot of moving parts", and opined that compared to the other remixes on the album "none go quite as hard" as this one. Conversely, Robin Murray from Clash found it one of the missteps of the album, saying that "the dense effects seem to distort the song, and it’s perhaps a case of too-many-cooks." Alexa Camp of Slant Magazine called the remix "a Frankensteinian abomination that chops up and distorts guest Elton John's vocals, making an even bigger mockery of the legendary musician than the original did."

On the day of Dawn of Chromatica's release, Gaga posted a video of herself with cartoon filters through her social media, which included a snippet from the breakdown of the "Sine from Above" remix, along with a message encouraging her followers to "smile and dance through the pain". The remix peaked at number 39 on the Billboard Hot Dance/Electronic Songs chart.

== Credits and personnel ==
Credits adapted from Tidal.

=== "Sine from Above" ===
- Lady Gaga – vocals, songwriter
- Elton John – vocals, songwriter
- BloodPop – producer, songwriter, guitar, keyboards, percussion, bass, drums
- Klahr – producer, songwriter, guitar, keyboards, percussion, bass, drums
- Axwell – producer, songwriter, guitar, keyboards, percussion, bass, drums
- Liohn – producer, songwriter, guitar, keyboards, percussion, bass, drums
- Burns – producer, guitar, keyboards
- Rami Yacoub – additional producer, songwriter
- Benjamin Rice – songwriter, mixer, recording engineer, vocal producer
- Ryan Tedder – songwriter
- Sebastian Ingrosso – songwriter
- Vincent Pontare – songwriter
- Salem Al Fakir – songwriter
- Tom Norris – mixer
- E. Scott Kelly – assistant mixer
- Randy Merrill – mastering engineer

=== "Chromatica III" ===
- Lady Gaga – composition, production
- Morgan Kibby – composition, production
- Ian Walker – bass
- Giovanna M Clayton – cello
- Timothy E Loo – cello
- Vanessa Freebairn-Smith – cello
- Amie Doherty – conductor
- Allen Fogle – French horn, horn
- Dylan Hurt – French horn, horn
- Katelyn Faraudo – French horn, horn
- Laura K Brenes – French horn, horn
- Mark Adams – French horn, horn
- Teag Reaves – French horn, horn
- Nicholas Daley – trombone
- Reginald Yound – trombone
- Steven M. Holtman – trombone
- Andrew Duckles – viola
- Erol Rynearson – viola
- Linnea Powell – viola
- Meredith Crawford – viola
- Alyssa Park – violin
- Chart Bisharat – violin
- Jessica Guideri – violin
- Luanne Homzy – violin
- Lucia Micarelli – violin
- Marisa Kuney – violin
- Neel Hammond – violin
- Shalini Vijayan – violin
- Songa Lee – violin
- Mike Schuppan – mixing, studio personnel
- Randy Merrill – mastering, studio personnel
- Gina Zimmitti – orchestra contractor
- Whitney Martin – orchestra contractor

== Charts ==
=== Weekly charts ===
Weekly chart performance for "Sine from Above"
Chart (2020)	Peak position
Australia (ARIA)	93
France (SNEP)	200
Greece (IFPI)	94
Portugal (AFP)	109
Scottish Singles Sales (Official Charts)	82
UK Singles Downloads (Official Charts)	59
US Bubbling Under Hot 100 (Billboard)	16
US Hot Dance/Electronic Songs (Billboard)	14
Venezuela (Record Report)	80

Weekly chart performance for "Sine from Above (Chester Lockhart, Mood Killer & Lil Texas remix)"
Chart (2021)	Peak position
US Hot Dance/Electronic Songs (Billboard)	39

=== Year-end charts ===
2020 year-end chart performance for "Sine from Above"
Chart (2020)	Position
US Hot Dance/Electronic Songs (Billboard)	55

== Certifications ==
Certifications for "Sine from Above"
Region	Certification	Certified units/sales
Brazil (Pro-Música Brasil)	Platinum	40,000^{‡}
^{‡} Sales+streaming figures based on certification alone.
