= Alice (Lady Gaga song) =

2020 song by Lady Gaga

Song by Lady Gaga

from the album Chromatica
- Studio: Conway, EastWest (Hollywood); Good Father (Los Angeles)
- Genre: House; dance-pop; electronica
- Length: 2:57
- Label: Interscope
- Composers: Lady Gaga; BloodPop; Axel Hedfors; Justin Tranter; Johannes Klahr
- Producers: BloodPop; Axwell; Johannes Klahr

Audio video
- "Alice" on YouTube

"Alice" is a song by American singer Lady Gaga recorded for her sixth studio album, Chromatica (2020). It appears as the album's second track, preceded by a string arrangement titled "Chromatica I". Written by Lady Gaga, BloodPop, Axwell, Justin Tranter, and Johannes Klahr, with production credits by BloodPop, Axwell, and Klahr, "Alice" is a house and dance-pop song with electronica influences. It references Lewis Carroll's 1865 children's novel Alice's Adventures in Wonderland, and talks about the singer's willingness to keep trying despite difficulties.

"Alice" received generally positive critical reception, with reviewers praising its dance-pop energy, theatrical vocals, and house-inspired production, though some criticized its lyrics and stylistic choices. In the United States, it appeared on the Billboard Hot Dance/Electronic Songs listing at number 7, while charting in a dozen other countries, including a peak of number 29 in the United Kingdom. A remix version by Lsdxoxo was released as part of Gaga's remix album, Dawn of Chromatica (2021). Gaga performed "Alice" live on The Chromatica Ball stadium tour (2022).

== Writing and production ==
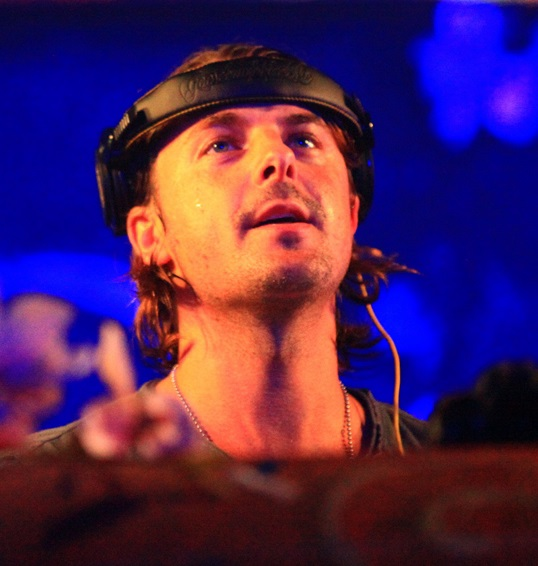
Axwell (pictured) co-wrote and produced "Alice", with one of his solo works informing the team's creative direction.

"Alice" was written by Lady Gaga, BloodPop, Axwell, Justin Tranter, and Johannes Klahr, and produced by BloodPop, Axwell, and Klahr. Gaga explained that the song grew out of difficult conversations she had with BloodPop about her outlook on life, expressing both her doubt about enduring and her resolve to keep trying.

BloodPop noted that Axwell's solo track "Nobody Else" influenced the creative direction, particularly its driving energy and crisp house-music punch, qualities they wanted to capture for "Alice" and another song, "Free Woman". The team also incorporated classic dance-music elements to achieve that atmosphere; for instance, they used the Korg M1 organ bass—an instrument heard throughout early house records. BloodPop explained that its harmonic, warm-sounding bassline fit seamlessly with Gaga's vocal delivery and anchored the track's club-ready feel.

Prior the song's release on the album Chromatica (2020), there had been online speculation that it might be named after Gaga's childhood dog, Alice, who died in 2013. The track references the fictional character Alice and the imaginary realm of Wonderland from Lewis Carroll's 1865 children's novel Alice's Adventures in Wonderland, starting with the chorus "My name isn't Alice, but I'll keep looking for Wonderland". The motif serves as a metaphor for the difficulty of attaining personal peace. Gaga further elaborated on the song's background on Spotify:

In order to do hard things, we have to be willing to try. Sometimes trying involves dreaming. Some of us, I to be certain, must be able to imagine the greatness that's revealed within us when we overcome obstacles. Otherwise, what's the point? When we are sad this is more difficult, but I recall that there's always Wonderland...

== Composition ==
"Alice"
A 26-second sample of "Alice" highlighting its house-driven production as well as the "ahhs" and "oh ma-ma-ma" ad-libs that prompted comparisons to Gaga's 2009 single "Bad Romance".

"Alice" is a house and dance-pop song with electronica influences, built around kick drums, shimmering synths, and an upper-register vocal performance. Journalists noted its strong foundation in classic house music: The Wall Street Journal highlighted its "kinetic" composition marked by offbeat high-hats and cyclical neo-Latin keyboard lines, while others pointed to its "throbbing electronic pop beat" and its evocation of 1990s chart house. Several reviewers drew stylistic parallels to earlier dance tracks—Vulture noted the "booming, chopped-up" vocals in the chorus, comparing them to vocal house standards such as Aly-Us's "Follow Me" (1992), W Magazine heard echoes of Haddaway's "What Is Love" (1993), and The Observer likened it to tracks like Ken Doh's "Nakasaki" (1996) and Ultra Naté's "Free" (1997). Elements of the chorus, including the "'ahhs' and an 'oh ma-ma-ma' stutter", were also viewed as reminiscent of the melodyc hooks of Gaga's own "Bad Romance" (2009). Lyrically, the song reflects a restless mind searching for clarity and a place to belong, summarized by one journalist as a need for a "symphony" to break through the noise.

For Gaga's third remix album Dawn of Chromatica (2021), "Alice" was reworked by the Berlin-based producer Lsdxoxo, whose version was described by Clash as a "dancefloor bumper".

=== "Chromatica I" ===
"Chromatica I"

Composition by Lady Gaga

from the album Chromatica
- Released: May 29, 2020
- Studio: Henson Recording Studios (Los Angeles, CA)
- Length: 1:00
- Songwriters: Lady Gaga; Morgan Kibby
- Producers: Kibby; Gaga

Audio video
- "Chromatica I" on YouTube

"Alice" is preceded by an orchestral interlude called "Chromatica I", which opens Chromatica and transitions directly into the track. As Gaga wanted to highlight that the album has three distinct acts, she recruited musician Morgan Kibby to produce interludes for the album, with the help of a 26-person orchestra who performed the string arrangements. Kibby was brought into the studio after submitting the demo that would eventually become "Chromatica I". With the long string runs at the beginning of this composition, Kibby pursued to recall "the majesty and grandeur" of Donna Summer and Gloria Gaynor. She also aimed to reference classic scores from films such as THX 1138 and Outland. In an interview with Zane Lowe on Apple Music's Beats 1, Gaga talked about the background of "Chromatica I":

The beginning of the album symbolizes for me the beginning of my journey to healing. It goes right into this grave string arrangement, where you feel this pending doom that is what happens if I face all the things that scare me. That string arrangement is setting the stage for a more cinematic experience with this world — that is how I make sense of things.

Callie Ahlgrim of Insider praised how effortlessly "Chromatica I" transitions into "Alice", while Courteney Larocca from the same outlet remarked that it has the feel of a fantasy film opening. Vulture's Kristen S. Hé also found it cinematic, noting it evokes a range of images and emotions, from windswept landscapes to human achievements and the passage of time. Canadian singer and producer Grimes was set to remix the interlude for Dawn of Chromatica, as well as "Chromatica II" and "Chromatica III"; however, her contributions did not make the final cut.

== Critical reception ==
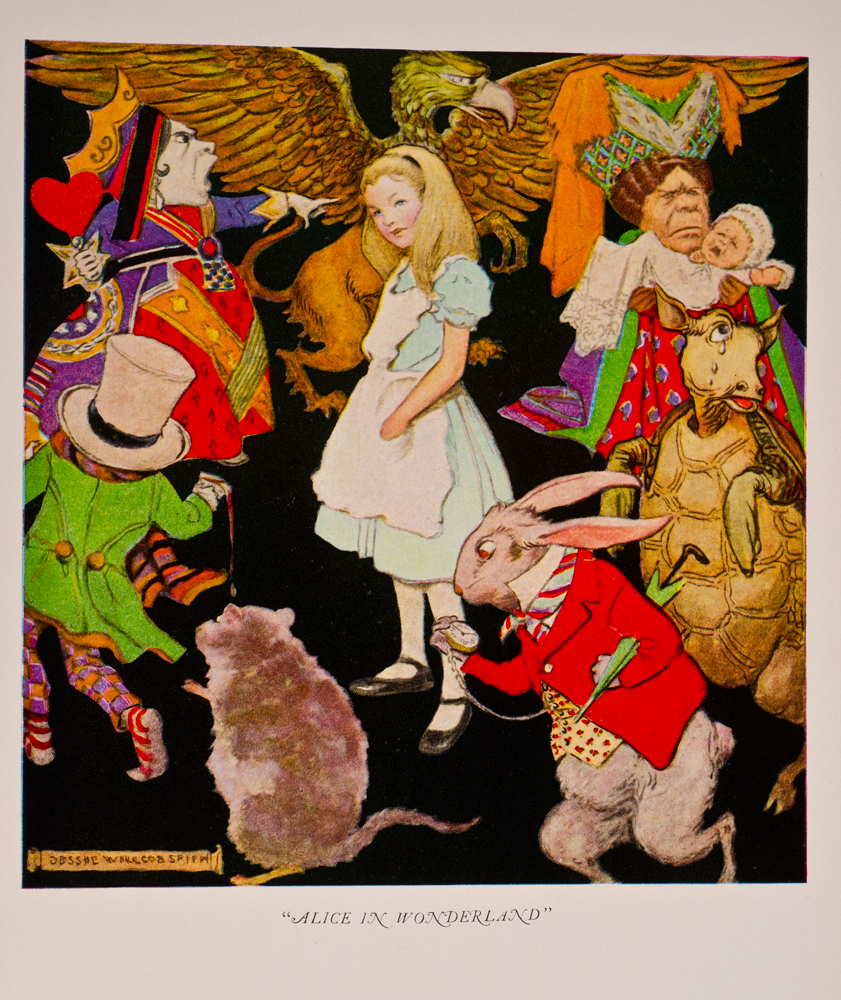
Insider's Callie Ahlgrim observed that, despite being a common pop-music reference, the Alice in Wonderland imagery aligns well with Gaga's portrayal and the themes of Chromatica.

Stephen Daw of Billboard ranked "Alice" as the sixth best track on Chromatica, comparing its sound to the "deliriously entertaining" post-rave dance music of the early 2000s. Jason Lipshutz, also writing for the magazine, described the song as a "post-rave triumph". Quinn Moreland of Pitchfork considered the lyrics "Maestro, play me your symphony/I will listen to anything/Take me on a trip, DJ, free my mind" one of Chromatica's "wild lyrical clunkers". USA Today's Patrick Ryan described the song as "hypnotic". Vulture's Kristen S. Hé felt the track served as the "perfect catalyst" for Gaga to reconnect with the dance-pop she had long avoided, noting that it features her giving in to the allure of a shuffling house beat. Spencer Kornhaber from The Atlantic listed "Alice" as one of the standout moments of Chromatica with its "gasping chorus." Lindsay Zoladz of The New York Times noted the song's strong replay value, while fellow Times critic Caryn Ganz described "Alice" as possessing a "glittery hopefulness".

Alessa Dominguez of BuzzFeed News said that Chromatica opens strongly with "Alice", noting Gaga's "glam-theatrical fervor". She added that the track captures the album's house-inspired sound and escapist themes, complemented by Gaga's operatic vocal theatrics, and remarked that when she sings "Take me home", the listener is compelled to follow her "down the rabbit hole". Insider's Callie Ahlgrim praised the song as "classic Lady Gaga in all her blood-pumping, bass-thumping glory", noting that although Alice's Adventures in Wonderland "has become an oft-used reference in pop music", she appreciated how it reflects and enhances the album's themes, envisioning Gaga as a "wide-eyed, curious Alice type and 'Chromatica' as a surrealist third space in between earth and escapism." Slate's Carl Wilson felt the song pulls listeners into the album's "Wonderland", centered on the dance floor, noting its "brisk house workout" and "downshifted vocal effects", and remarked that while it might not "stick in your head", it still "sets the mood".

On a more critical note, Patrick Gomez of The A.V. Club argued that the song's production "becomes sleepy" due to its reliance on a generic '90s dance-floor beat. Evan Sawdey of PopMatters called it "pleasant if middling", and the "least memorable track" off Chromatica. Adam White of The Independent described the "take me… home!" post-chorus shriek a "blast", but felt the track overall was "oddly impersonal". Dan Weiss from Spin thought that the Alice in Wonderland metaphors "are sadly not far enough from the shallow".

== Commercial performance ==
In the United States, "Alice" was the only album track that was not released in advance to debut on the Billboard Hot 100, entering the chart at number 84, and it also reached number 7 on Billboard's Dance/Electronic Songs chart. In Canada, the song charted at number 78 on the Canadian Hot 100. In the United Kingdom, it peaked at number 29 on the UK Singles Chart. In Oceania, it reached number 59 on Australia's ARIA Singles Chart, and number 3 on the New Zealand Hot Singles chart. Additionally, the song reached number 60 on the Greek Internacional Digital Singles Chart, 63 on the Scottish Singles Sales Chart, 67 on the Portuguese Top 100 Singles chart, and 84 on the Italian Top Songs chart. The track was also certified Platinum in Brazil for exceeding 40,000 units sold.

== Live performances ==
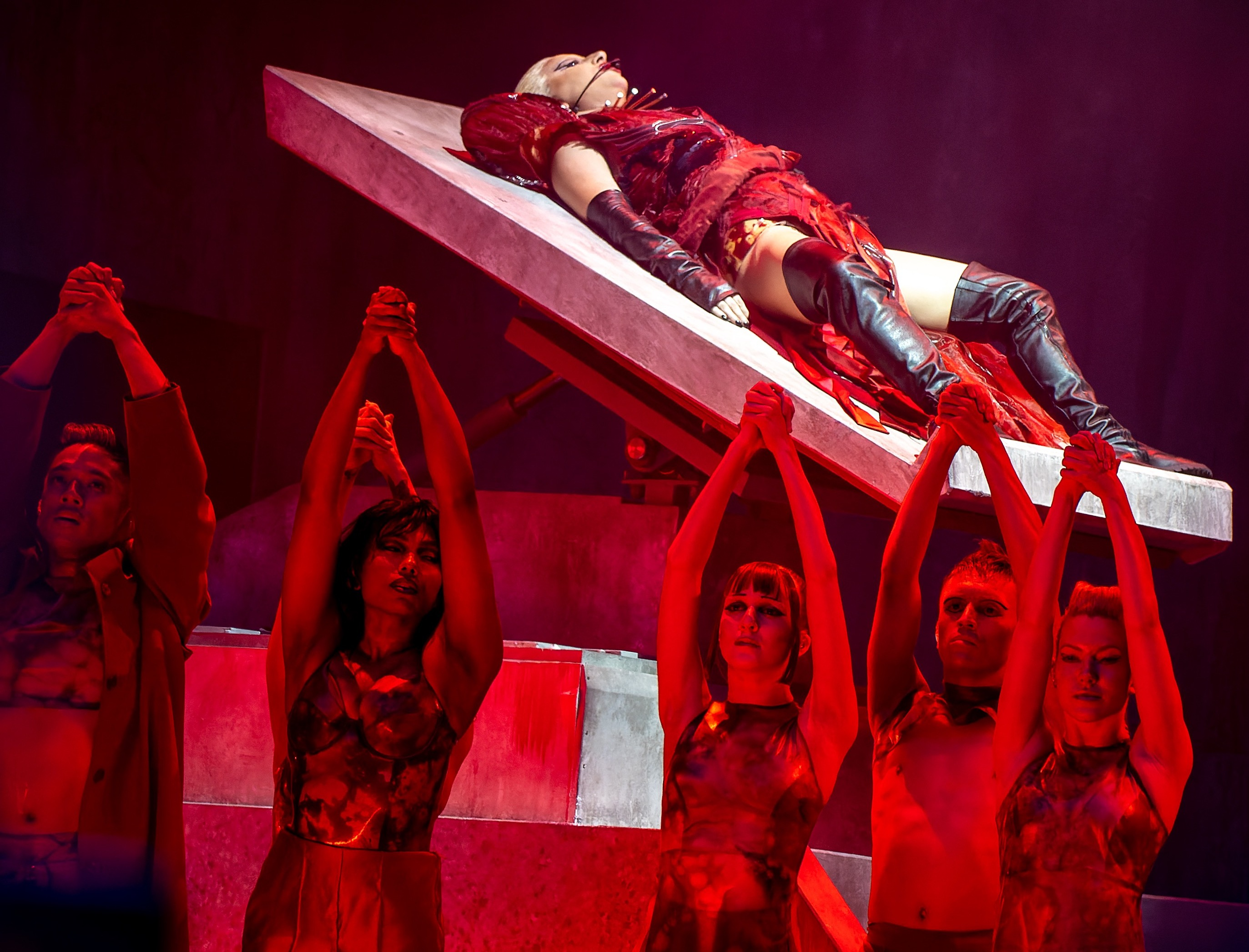
Gaga performing "Alice" on The Chromatica Ball tour, 2022

In 2022, Gaga performed "Alice" live at The Chromatica Ball stadium tour as the first song of Act One of the show. Similarly to the album, the song was preceded by the instrumentals of "Chromatica I" as an intro, accompanied by visuals of embryos and eggs. Gaga appeared on stage lying on an operating table while singing the song. She was wearing a blood-red gown with peak-shoulders – designed by her sister, Natali Germanotta – along with black leather boots and fingerless gloves.

In his concert review, David Cobbald of The Line of Best Fit thought the sequence had "undertones of rebirth", with Gaga lying on what appeared to be a "morgue slab". NME's Nick Levine described the performance as a slightly shocking presentation that emphasizes the subtle mental anguish in the lyrics, highlighting Gaga's pleading lines: "Where's my body? I'm stuck in my mind."

== Credits and personnel ==
Credits adapted from the liner notes of Chromatica.

=== "Alice" ===
- Lady Gaga – vocals, songwriter
- BloodPop – producer, songwriter, keyboards, bass, drums
- Johannes Klahr – producer, songwriter, keyboards, bass, drums
- Axwell – producer, keyboards, bass, drums
- Justin Tranter – songwriter
- Benjamin Rice – mixer, studio personnel, vocal producer
- Tom Norris – mixer, studio personnel
- E. Scott Kelly – mixer engineer, studio personnel
- Randy Merrill – mastering engineer, studio personnel

=== "Chromatica I" ===
- Lady Gaga – composition, production
- Morgan Kibby – composition, production
- Ian Walker – bass
- Giovanna M Clayton – cello
- Timothy E Loo – cello
- Vanessa Freebairn-Smith – cello
- Amie Doherty – conductor
- Allen Fogle – French horn, horn
- Dylan Hurt – French horn, horn
- Katelyn Faraudo – French horn, horn
- Laura K Brenes – French horn, horn
- Mark Adams – French horn, horn
- Teag Reaves – French horn, horn
- Nicholas Daley – trombone
- Reginald Yound – trombone
- Steven M. Holtman – trombone
- Andrew Duckles – viola
- Erol Rynearson – viola
- Linnea Powell – viola
- Meredith Crawford – viola
- Alyssa Park – violin
- Chart Bisharat – violin
- Jessica Guideri – violin
- Luanne Homzy – violin
- Lucia Micarelli – violin
- Marisa Kuney – violin
- Neel Hammond – violin
- Shalini Vijayan – violin
- Songa Lee – violin
- Mike Schuppan – mixing, studio personnel
- Randy Merrill – mastering, studio personnel
- Gina Zimmitti – orchestra contractor
- Whitney Martin – orchestra contractor

== Charts ==
=== "Alice" ===
Weekly chart performance for "Alice"
Chart (2020)	Peak position
Australia (ARIA)	59
Canada Hot 100 (Billboard)	78
Czech Republic Singles Digital (ČNS IFPI)	97
France (SNEP)	112
Greece (IFPI)	60
Italy (FIMI)	84
Lithuania (AGATA)	67
New Zealand Hot Singles (Recorded Music NZ)	3
Portugal (AFP)	67
Scottish Singles Sales (Official Charts)	63
Slovakia Singles Digital (ČNS IFPI)	92
UK Singles (Official Charts)	29
US Billboard Hot 100	84
US Hot Dance/Electronic Songs (Billboard)	7

Weekly chart performance for "Alice (Lsdxoxo remix)"
Chart (2021)	Peak position
US Hot Dance/Electronic Songs (Billboard)	26

Yearly chart performance for "Alice"
Chart (2020)	Position
US Hot Dance/Electronic Songs (Billboard)	36

=== "Chromatica I" ===
Weekly chart performance for "Chromatica I"
Chart (2020)	Peak position
Portugal (AFP)	145
US Bubbling Under Hot 100 (Billboard)	25

== Certifications ==
Certifications for "Alice"
Region	Certification	Certified units/sales
Brazil (Pro-Música Brasil)	Platinum	40,000^{‡}
^{‡} Sales+streaming figures based on certification alone.
