= 911 (Lady Gaga song) =

2020 single by Lady Gaga

- Sofi Tukker Remix cover

Single by Lady Gaga

from the album Chromatica
- Released: September 18, 2020
- Recorded: 2019
- Studio: Henson (Los Angeles)
- Genre: Eurodisco; synth-pop; electropop
- Length: 2:52
- Label: Interscope
- Songwriters: Lady Gaga; BloodPop; Madeon; Justin Tranter
- Producers: BloodPop; Madeon

Lady Gaga singles chronology
"Rain on Me" (2020)	"911" (2020)	"Free Woman" (2021)

Music video
- "911" on YouTube

"911" is a song by American singer Lady Gaga recorded for her sixth studio album, Chromatica (2020). It appears as the album's eighth track, preceded by a string arrangement titled "Chromatica II". It was written by Gaga together with Justin Tranter, BloodPop, and Madeon, with the latter two also producing along with Benjamin Rice. It is a Eurodisco, synth-pop, and electropop song with influences from techno and funk. Gaga sings in monotonous, robotic vocal effects for most part of the track. Lyrically, "911" talks about mental health and the antipsychotic medication Gaga takes.

Numerous music critics called the song one of the best from the album, praising both its production and songwriting. The "seamless" transition between "Chromatica II" and "911" was also highlighted and was turned into several memes upon the album's release. "911" was serviced to French and Italian radios as the third single off the album on September 18 and 25, 2020, respectively. The track had minor chart placements in a few countries, and in the United States, it reached a peak position of number 10 on the Billboard Dance/Electronic Songs chart.

The accompanying music video was directed by Tarsem Singh and features a surreal dreamscape and a twist ending. It was largely inspired by Armenian film director Sergei Parajanov's 1969 Soviet art film The Color of Pomegranates. The song received several remix versions, including one by Charli XCX and A. G. Cook on Gaga's remix album, Dawn of Chromatica (2021). Gaga performed "911" at the 2020 MTV Video Music Awards and The Chromatica Ball concert tour (2022).

== Recording and release ==
"911" was written for Lady Gaga's sixth studio album, Chromatica (2020) by Gaga, Justin Tranter, BloodPop, and Madeon; production was done by the latter two, along with Benjamin Rice. The song started off as a demo from BloodPop and Tranter's sessions together. Madeon, who previously worked with Gaga on her 2013 album Artpop, first recommended other producers who he felt to be a good fit for the song, but ultimately BloodPop invited him directly. Detailing his involvement in the project, he said:

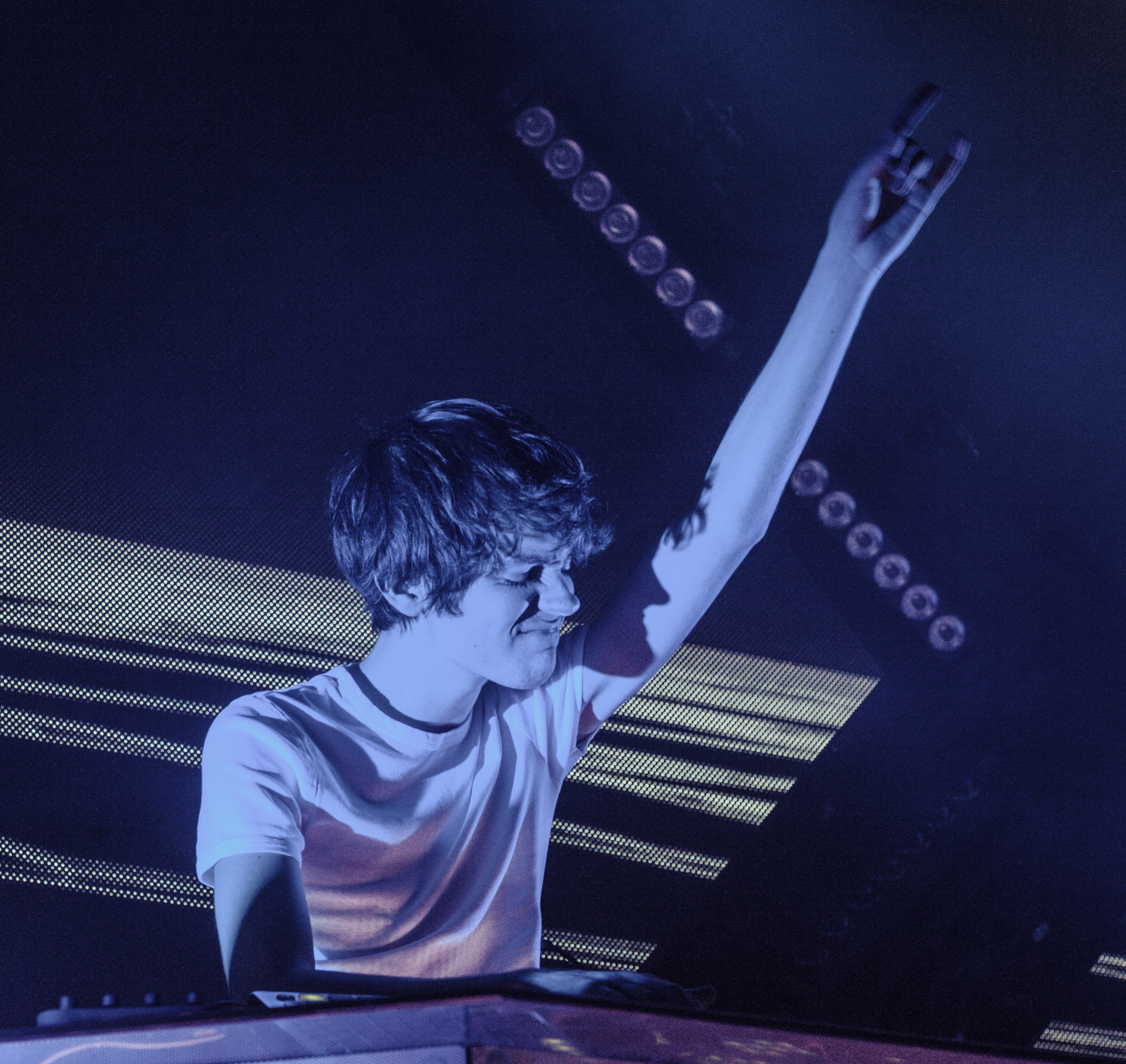
Madeon, co-producer of "911", previously worked with Gaga on her 2013 album Artpop.

I worked a little bit at home remaking new drums and bass sounds and other details. Then I joined everybody in the studio and I tweaked the chorus melody slightly and wrote the new breakdown chords etc. But the soul of the song was there long before I joined! It was really great when Gaga came to record final vocals... We had an awesome session where she dug deep to deliver breathtaking vocals.

Madeon further explained that Gaga was determined that everyone who started working on the track focused on the message of the song, so that it did not get undermined by the production. Their goal was keeping the production "quiet" as "there's so much life and impact in those lyrics that you want to let them breathe. You don't need to drown them." According to BloodPop, while Gaga was recording "911", she insisted that the studio be near pitch-black and that she wear a wig in order to feel like someone else as she wanted to "relive everything she was talking about in the song with every take".

Universal Music Group issued the song to French and Italian radios on September 18 and 25, respectively, as the third single off Chromatica.

== Lyrical content and composition ==
A Billboard article described "911" as "a song about when your brain and your body feel at war with each other." The track details Gaga's relationship to her antipsychotic medication, olanzapine, which she takes for neuropathic pain and regular trauma responses, as she is not permitted to turn to pain medications in fear of addiction. Gaga said: "It's about an antipsychotic that I take. And it's because I can't always control things that my brain does. I know that. And I have to take medication to stop the process that occurs." In the chorus, Gaga acknowledges her mental illness and her high reliance on the antipsychotic with the line "My biggest enemy is me / pop a 911", with 911 both referring to the emergency phone number and her medications. Vulture, an online blog associated with New York Magazine, opined that "911" captures "the inside of Gaga's brain as if it's a sci-fi construct, where neurons fire and spark chain reactions beyond her control. [...] Gaga depicts popping a pill as a mostly positive, necessary act — but every day remains a struggle." AllMusic referred to the song as a "cry for help". Talking with Entertainment Weekly, BloodPop further elaborated on the track's background:

[Medication] is not fun to talk about for most people, but it's a very real part of modern life for those who need it. This was her truth and she wanted to write about it even though she knew it would be painful to "go there". ["911"] hit me particularly hard as well because at the time I had to get on medication for OCD and depression for the first time in my life.

"911"
A 25-second sample of "911". It portrays the singer's monotonous, robotic vocal over the techno-funk groove, and her switching to a higher voice while singing "Can't see me cry ever again…".

"911" is largely a Euro disco, synth-pop and electropop song, which includes industrial synthesizers, a techno-funk groove, and a "trippy" chorus. Simon K. from Sputnikmusic believed that its "pulsating groove [...] brings a cold and clinical feeling to the track". The Observer's Emily Mackay highlighted how the pace of the music is in harmony with Gaga's lyrics, writing "the beat jackhammers, driving her up to a Donna Summer trill, then slows to a more comfortable groove as she regains perspective and control". Gaga sings in monotonous, robotic vocal effects for the majority of the song, though she switches to a "higher, more vulnerable" voice at the pre-chorus. According to the sheet music published on Musicnotes.com, "911" is written in the time signature of common time, and is composed in the key of B-flat major with a tempo of 120 beats per minute. The vocals range from the tonal nodes of F_{3} to D_{5}.

Entertainment Weekly's Leah Greenblatt and NME's Hannah Mylrea compared "911" to the work of French electronic music duo Daft Punk, with Greenblatt also noting the contrast between the "playful" funky melody, and the lyrics, which involve "darker allusions to manic moods and pharmaceuticals". Jem Aswad from Variety found a "vocal nod to Lipps Inc.'s 1980 smash 'Funky Town' in Gaga's trademark robo-dominatrix voice." Nick Smith of MusicOMH noted similarities to Kylie Minogue's "Speakerphone" (2007), while Slant Magazine's Alexa Camp deemed "911" reminiscent of Gaga's past singles, "LoveGame" (2009) and "G.U.Y." (2014). Similarly, Lindsay Zoladz of The New York Times felt that "911" harkens back to Gaga's earliest hits, and wondered if nostalgia for the late 2000s music "is already a thing".

=== "Chromatica II" ===
"Chromatica II"

Composition by Lady Gaga

from the album Chromatica
- Released: May 29, 2020
- Studio: Henson (Los Angeles, CA)
- Length: 0:41
- Songwriters: Lady Gaga; Morgan Kibby
- Producers: Kibby; Gaga

Audio video
- "Chromatica II" on YouTube

"911" is one of the three songs on the Chromatica album which are preceded by an orchestral interlude. Gaga wanted to emphasize the "cinematic" feeling of the record and felt that it had distinct acts, "such as the sharp right turn it takes when '911' kicks in." The interludes were composed by musician Morgan Kibby, who assembled a 26-person orchestra to record the string arrangements. Talking about the creative process of "Chromatica II", the interlude preceding "911", she explained:

"Chromatica II" was the final piece we composed, and at that point it was clear to Gaga that it should fall right before "911", which was already complete. I remember this moment in the studio so clearly, because she lit up, and without any words I flipped the keyboard around, pulled up the string sound she was envisioning, and she started to play this amazing marcato idea. From there, we massaged it, and I focused on the harmonies and dynamics to make sure it amped the energy up.

Upon the album's release, the seamless transition between "Chromatica II" and "911" became a fan-favorite and was discussed as an album highlight. It generated several memes, with people editing the transition into scenes from various films and television series, and recreating it with similar sounding songs, most notably with Kylie Minogue's "Can't Get You Out of My Head" (2001). Annie Zaleski of Time found the strings of "Chromatica II" a "delight", as they "crescendo and swerve" into "911".

Canadian singer and producer Grimes was set to remix the interlude for Gaga's third remix album Dawn of Chromatica, as well as "Chromatica I" and "Chromatica III"; however, her contributions did not make the final cut.

== Critical reception ==
"911" was named one of Chromatica's strongest tracks by various publications, such as The Washington Post, The A.V. Club, and Beats Per Minute. Finding it a "standout moment" on the album, The Atlantic's Spencer Kornhaber described it as a "playfully robotic" song which "reveals new intricacies with each listen." Stephen Daw of Billboard ranked the track as the third best from the album, with "deeply satisfying production" and "some ridiculously clever songwriting", while saying that Gaga "is in her element when she is delivering camp." Kory Grow from Rolling Stone thought the song "splits the difference between the Buggles and Kraftwerk, filtered through Gaga's kaleidoscope" and noted that "she's at her best... when taking musical risks", like with "911". Tom Johnson from The Line of Best Fit also found it an album highlight, saying that along with another track, "Replay", they are both "honest and thoughtful, brilliant dance music." Caryn Ganz of The New York Times listed the "winking monotony" of "911" as one of the moments she enjoyed from the album.

At Uproxx, Caitlin White said "911" is a standout where Gaga "manages to expertly balance her suffering and self-frustration with the dancefloor freedom that defines the album". BuzzFeed News' Alessa Dominguez argued that "only Gaga could write a danceable bop about taking antipsychotic medication." Writing for PopMatters, Evan Sawdey thought that even though "Gaga is still hiding behind vocoders and numerous filtered vocal effects", the song is one of the best moments of the album as her "real life and experiences are seeping through the gaps in the 4/4 rhythm chains". Los Angeles Times's Mikael Wood called it a "catchy, fist-pumping song". According to Slant Magazine's Sal Cinquemani, Gaga's "distorted vocals" and the "euphoric swoon of the track's pre-chorus" create an "effective contrast". Dan Weiss from Spin criticized the song for being "so breathlessly wordy you can't remember (or even find) the hook". Mark Richardson from The Wall Street Journal felt that "911" along with another song, "Enigma", "find Lady Gaga deploying the more bombastic style of her earlier hits to lesser effect."

== Chart performance ==
Upon the release of Chromatica, "911" debuted on several world charts. In the Billboard issue dated June 13, 2020, "911" debuted on the Bubbling Under Hot 100 Singles chart at number one, and on the Hot Dance/Electronic Digital Songs at number ten. In Canada, the song charted on the Canadian Hot 100 at number 85 in the issue dated June 13, 2020. On the UK Singles Downloads Chart, compiled by the Official Charts Company (OCC), the song entered at number 98. Further chart placements of the track include a number 76 position on the Australian Singles Chart, number 54 in Croatia, number 141 in France, and number 64 in Scotland. In Italy, the song charted at number 92, and later it was certified Gold by the Federazione Industria Musicale Italiana (FIMI) for selling over 35,000 units.

== Music video ==
=== Background and production ===
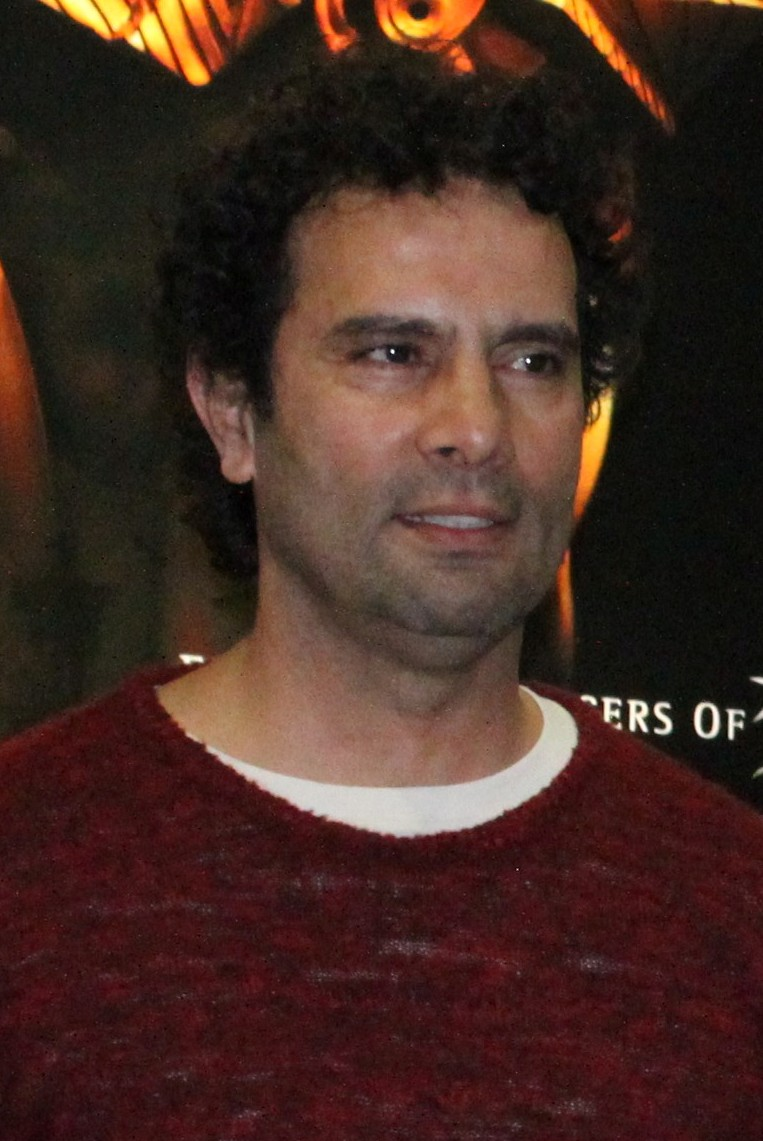
The song's music video was directed by Tarsem Singh.

The music video was directed by filmmaker Tarsem Singh and was shot in August 2020 in Valencia, a neighborhood in Santa Clarita, California. The sand dunes for the opening scene were photographed at San Luis Obispo by Tarsem, who removed the sea and changed the color of the sand to white in post-production. He originally wanted to shoot the desert scenes in New Mexico, and use a real city location instead of a backlot for the final scene, but they didn't get the necessary permissions due to the COVID-19 pandemic. Because of the pandemic, every one present on the filming location in Valencia were required to take COVID-19 tests and stand completely away from each other. The shooting was also made difficult by wearing tight clothes in the desert, with 118 °F (47 °C) heat, which caused some of the people to pass out. Nicola Formichetti outfitted the video, with many pieces designed by Russian-Armenian artist Karina Akopyan.

The concept for the story of the video came from Tarsem, who shared the more than 25-year-old idea with Gaga as her "life story spoke so much to him." He once considered using the idea for a video to Massive Attack, but that did not work out due to scheduling conflicts. According to Gaga, she felt the most "alive" while making the video, compared to any of the other Chromatica projects. She also disclosed with Tarsem that filming required her to "revisit the kind of dark hole she was in when she wrote it", though in the director's opinion, "she didn't slip back down; she shook it off and went back to work". Gaga later posted the following on her Instagram:

This short film is very personal to me, my experience with mental health and the way reality and dreams can interconnect to form heroes within us and all around us. [...] Something that was once my real life everyday [sic] is now a film, a true story that is now the past and not the present. It's the poetry of pain.

On September 17, 2020, Gaga retweeted a post from 2013 that said, "A POP MUSIC EMERGENCY IS UNDERWAY 911." The video premiered the following day at 9AM PT on YouTube. Tarsem revealed that it was supposed to be released earlier but was pushed back because it was "too close to 9/11, and that wasn't being sensitive enough." In addition to "911", the video includes the orchestral interludes "Chromatica II" and "Chromatica III", the preludes to "911" and "Sine from Above", respectively. LG Electronics later included an exclusive edit of the music video, along with commentary by Tarsem Singh, on its FOMO channel which is available on the company's smart TVs. On December 12, 2020, Gaga released the forty-ninth episode of her web series Gagavision, showing behind-the-scenes footage of the making of the video. On August 14, 2021, a 360-degree behind-the-scenes video was released on the CEEK VR app.

=== Synopsis ===
Gaga in a yellow dress, with two characters who are guiding her through the video. The painting in the background foreshadows the twist ending of the clip, and is reminiscent of some of Frida Kahlo's work.

The video begins with Gaga in a desert sprawled out next to a broken bicycle and pomegranates spilled on the ground. Gaga's eyes are concealed behind a red mesh mask from London-based Dead Lotus Couture. A figure dressed in black riding a dark horse lures her out of the dunes and into a mission. As the song starts, she enters the mission filled with oddly dressed people, including a man banging his head onto a pillow and a woman resembling Santa Muerte cradling a mummy. Additional characters call a man dressed in black and a woman dressed in white, who fly down from the sky hoisting an umbrella, as they watch Gaga move throughout the mission's courtyard. The two characters try to engage with Gaga, but she continues to drift away from them. When Gaga is trying to fly away, with a glory around her head, the man pulls her back down to the ground with a rope. Later in the video, Gaga appears in a black leather jumpsuit decorated with flowers, which covers her whole body. An item resembling an ambulance spinal board is brought in behind her. Everyone gathers inside the mission to watch Gaga, as the woman in white opens a wooden box akin to a defibrillator.

Gaga begins to cry and wail, waking up in the real world, where she is seen lying outside of a cinema, where a big sign advertises an "Armenian Film Festival". Paramedics shock her back to life after being hurt in a car-bicycle accident. While the doctors are tending to her she looks bewildered and screams out, "I didn't have my pills." All the imagery from the fantasy world appear as billboards on the street where the accident occurred, along with the people surrounding her.

=== Inspirations and analysis ===
Throughout the video, Singh visually references The Color of Pomegranates (1969), an Armenian Soviet art film directed by Armenian filmmaker Sergei Parajanov. The more obvious nods to the film include pomegranates scattered around Gaga's damaged bicycle, and the film's poster appearing on the street scene at the end of the video, alongside borrowed elements from the film and Armenian culture, such as a funeral frame, peacock feathers as a symbol of eternal life, and monasteries. Gaga's video presents the film's symbols in her own allegory of pain. Some of the outfits are inspired by painter Frida Kahlo's style, and the accident scene is reminiscent of the traumatic bus collision that inspired some of Kahlo's most famous work. Its reminiscent visuals were also inspired by Singh's 2000 film The Cell. Other references include Federico Fellini's 8½ (1963) and Alejandro Jodorowsky's The Holy Mountain (1973).

Similarly to The Wizard of Oz (1939), the characters appearing in Gaga's imagination are portrayed by the same people who she saw in reality, the victims and first responders who are at the site of the accident. For example, the man seen earlier banging his head into a pillow, is a driver who suffered head injury, laying his head on a deflated airbag, while the man and woman chasing Gaga throughout the hallucination represent the EMS personnel who are attempting to revive her. The video utilizes a wide array of symbolism used to indicate real world objects, such as Gaga's bracelet representing a tourniquet, and the mirror that flashes a light into Gaga's face representing the medical penlight used by the paramedic to inspect her responses in the real world. The blindfold on Gaga's face at the beginning of the video symbolizes how her character is unconscious in real life. In the final scene of Gaga's hallucination, there are several symbols — the same symbol from the cover art of Chromatica — and scars on her forehead, representing "things that she's gotten through in her life", the singer's makeup artist Sarah Tanno explains. It also makes reference to her song "Replay", which contains the lyrics "the scars on my mind are on replay".

=== Reception ===
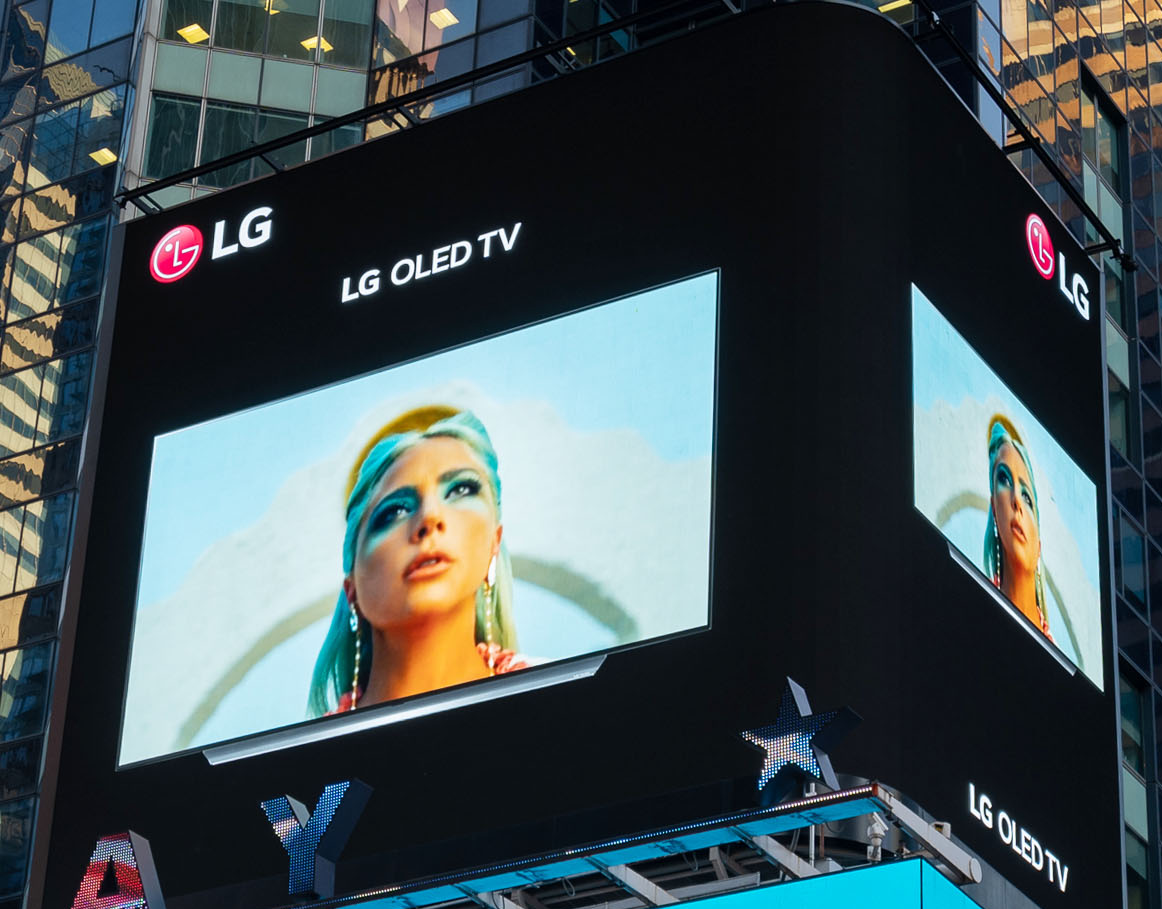
"911" short film displayed in Times Square in New York City

Justin Curto from Vulture wrote that "Lady Gaga is back to being her fully indecipherable self in her new music video [...] with an instantly iconic cast of characters and a twist that demands hours of rewatching and theorizing." Gil Kaufman of Billboard pointed out the music video's homage to The Color of Pomegranates, saying that it similarly "eschews traditional narrative in favor of dramatic, colorful scenes packed with eye-catching symbolism." Jon Blistein of Rolling Stone described the clip as an "eye-popping fever dream". Charlotte Krol from NME wrote that the singer "taps into her superb acting once again" with the music video. Writing for Variety, Jazz Tangcay stated "there's so much to unpack" in the video, saying that "it's filled with symbolism and that twist will start many discussions." Entertainment Weekly's Joey Nolfi also noted the "heavy symbolism" in the video, saying "the video itself defies classification." Janelle Okwodu of Vogue called the video "a stunning tribute to surreal style", adding that "the pop star goes to great lengths to make her music videos original, and [...] she raised the bar with the surprise release of '911', a [...] mini-film chock full of arresting imagery." Jenna Ryu from USA Today called it "artistically arresting" and highlighted that it contains strong colors, with many details and a catchy storytelling. Pitchfork's Eric Torres ranked the video as the third best one of September 2020, claiming "all the head-scratching symbology slips away, revealing a twist ending that should probably come with a trigger warning."

At the end of 2020, Billboard named it the fourth best music video of the year. It also won the award for Best Make-Up in a Commercial/Music Video at the 2020 Make-Up Artists and Hair Stylists Guild Awards. At the 2021 MTV Video Music Awards, the video was nominated for Best Cinematography and Best Art Direction.

== Live performances ==
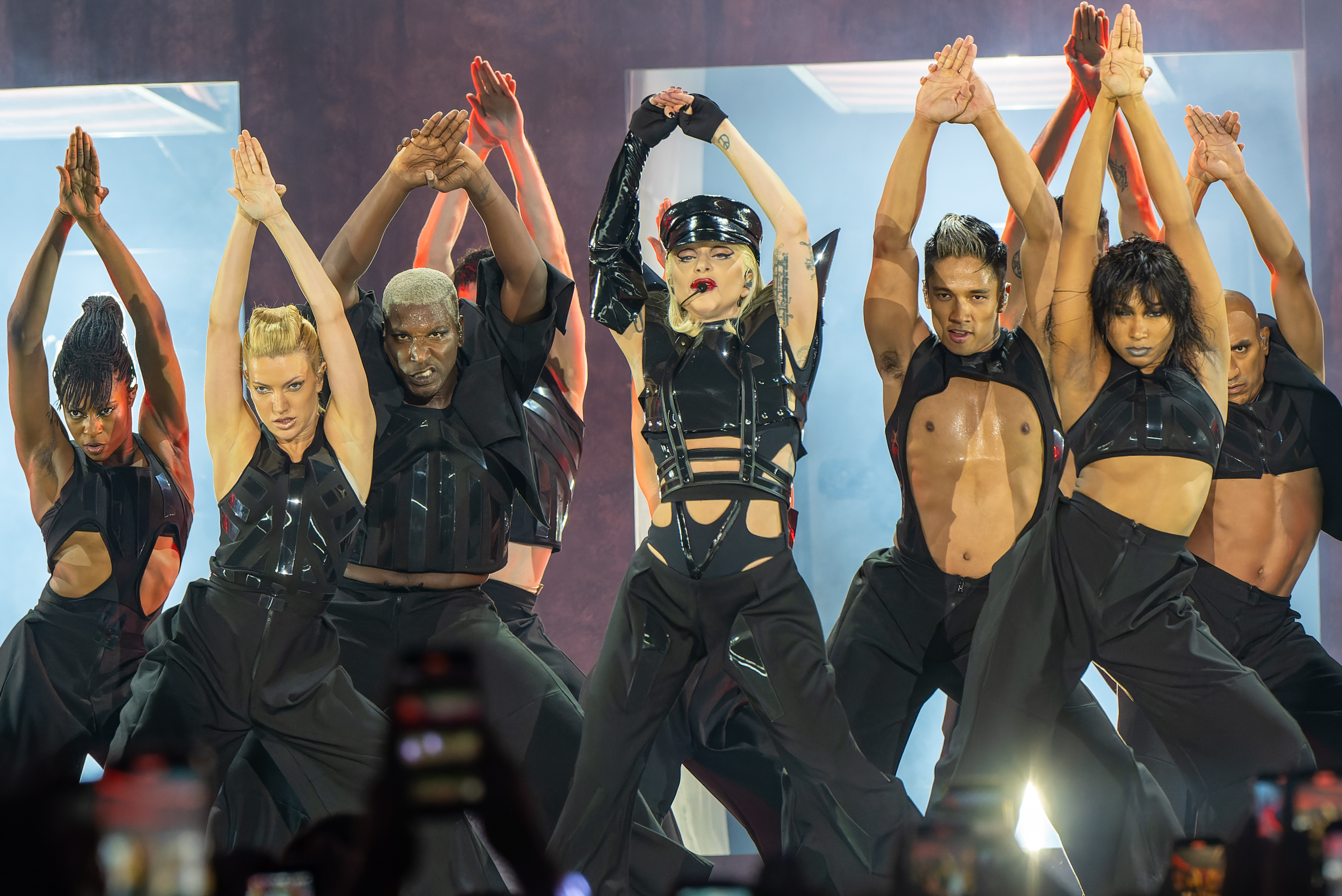
Gaga performing "911" on The Chromatica Ball tour

On August 30, 2020, Gaga performed a medley of songs from Chromatica at the 2020 MTV Video Music Awards, which included "911". The performance started with Gaga laying on a couch, watching a '90s throwback VMAs ceremony. She then slid down a pole to a room full of naked mannequins while "Chromatica II" was playing. As the instrumentals segued into "911", she joined her backup dancers for the choreographed performance. Gaga was wearing a bright green two-piece bodysuit, along with a sound-reactive LED face mask.

In 2022, Gaga performed "911" at The Chromatica Ball stadium tour, where it was again preceded by "Chromatica II" as the inderlude. Frantic red lights illuminated the stage, while Gaga was singing the song in a vinyl dominatrix ensemble, complete with a policewoman cap. In his review for the tour, David Cobbald of The Line of Best Fit highlighted the "notorious" transition from "Chromatica II" to "911", praising the dancers for the choreography which was "executed with precision and togetherness".

== Remixes ==
Remixes by Bruno Martini, Sofi Tukker, and WEISS were released on December 4, 2020. Madeon, one of the original song's producers, remixed "911" for his DJ mix NYE 2021 that was released three weeks later.

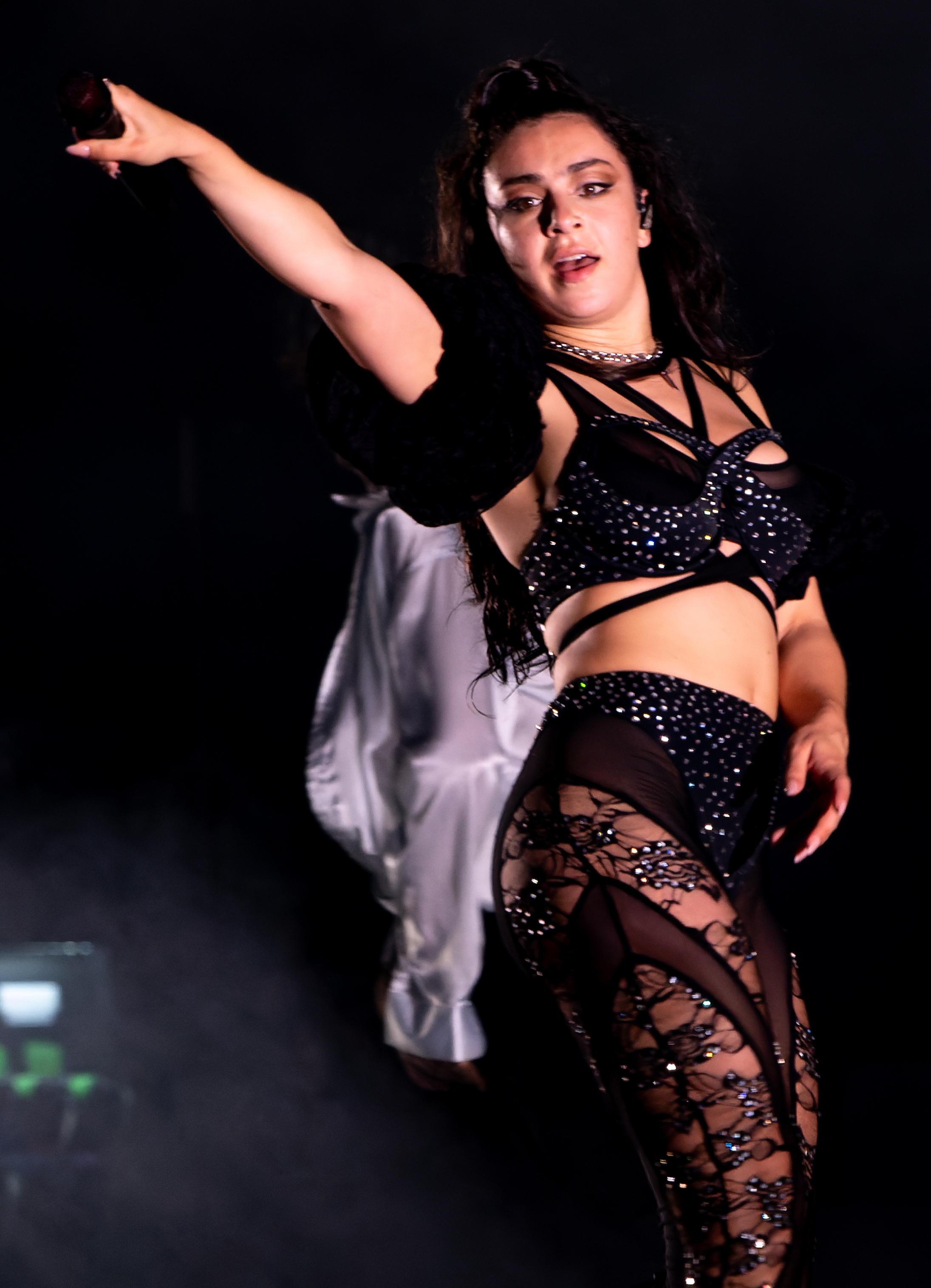
A remix of "911" on Dawn of Chromatica (2021) features British singer Charli XCX.

During a Q&A on Twitter in March 2021, Charli XCX revealed she was contacted by BloodPop to be part of a remix for the song, but nothing came of it. Later that day, the producer posted a screenshot of a conversation with her confirming he had sent its stems to her back in November 2020. However, due to a communication error, XCX claimed to have never gotten them, but would look to see if her team has them. The following May, XCX confirmed that "the creation process has begun". Her remix, featuring English producer A. G. Cook, was ultimately released on September 3, 2021, as part of Gaga's remix album, Dawn of Chromatica. The song includes new verses with Charli XCX's lines. Sam Murphy of Junkee noted the song as an example of how the record "always keeps that underlying sadness at the root with an eye on brighter days", illustrated by Charli XCX's line "I look out to Venus and search for a place / And search for a place / And sometimes I hate myself", and in a "more triumphant" part of the track, "If it's all getting way harder / Turn it up, party to Gaga". The remix abandons the original track's steady beat, instead going for an overly distorted sound.

Neil Z. Yeung of AllMusic called the remix one of the highlights of Dawn of Chromatica, saying that "Charli XCX and A. G. Cook revive '911' as a pulsing digital epic". Pitchfork's Jamieson Cox praised the "crystalline hyperpop" remix and its "stunning" final verse and outro, dubbing it "some of Charli's finest work since Pop 2," her mixtape from 2017. Alexa Camp of Slant Magazine thought that Charli XCX "injects some much-needed expressiveness" in the song, while Cook "drags [it] from the late aughts into something approaching the future." Robin Murray of Clash praised the remix as "stellar". Joey Nolfi of Entertainment Weekly thought that Charli XCX reimagined the song "into something that suits her own brand while bringing out new layers in Gaga's raw lyrics." The A.V. Club's Gabrielle Sanchez felt that Charli XCX and Cook "let their imaginations get away from them", "convoluting" Gaga's original by downplaying its "standout parts". She also regarded the new verses by Charli XCX as "only so-so." The remix peaked at number 14 on the Billboard Hot Dance/Electronic Songs chart.

== Track listing ==
Digital download / streaming – Bruno Martini remix

- "911" (Bruno Martini remix) – 2:46
- "911" (Bruno Martini extended remix) – 3:40

Digital download / streaming – Sofi Tukker remix

- "911" (Sofi Tukker remix) – 3:46
- "911" (Sofi Tukker extended remix) – 4:17

Digital download / streaming – WEISS remix

- "911" (WEISS remix) – 5:43

== Credits and personnel ==
Credits adapted from Tidal.

=== "911" ===
- Lady Gaga – vocals, songwriter, backing vocals
- BloodPop – producer, songwriter, bass, drums, guitar, keyboards, percussion
- Madeon – producer, songwriter, bass, drums, guitar, keyboards, percussion
- Justin Tranter – songwriter
- Benjamin Rice – vocal production, mixer, studio personnel
- Tom Norris – mixer, studio personnel
- Elias Inácio – guitar (Note: Elias Inácio is only credited in the Bruno Martini remix version.)

=== "Chromatica II" ===
- Lady Gaga – composition, production
- Morgan Kibby – composition, production
- Ian Walker – bass
- Giovanna M Clayton – cello
- Timothy E Loo – cello
- Vanessa Freebairn-Smith – cello
- Amie Doherty – conductor
- Allen Fogle – French horn, horn
- Dylan Hurt – French horn, horn
- Katelyn Faraudo – French horn, horn
- Laura K Brenes – French horn, horn
- Mark Adams – French horn, horn
- Teag Reaves – French horn, horn
- Nicholas Daley – trombone
- Reginald Yound – trombone
- Steven M. Holtman – trombone
- Andrew Duckles – viola
- Erol Rynearson – viola
- Linnea Powell – viola
- Meredith Crawford – viola
- Alyssa Park – violin
- Chart Bisharat – violin
- Jessica Guideri – violin
- Luanne Homzy – violin
- Lucia Micarelli – violin
- Marisa Kuney – violin
- Neel Hammond – violin
- Shalini Vijayan – violin
- Songa Lee – violin
- Mike Schuppan – mixing, studio personnel
- Randy Merrill – mastering, studio personnel
- Gina Zimmitti – orchestra contractor
- Whitney Martin – orchestra contractor

== Charts ==
=== Weekly charts ===
Weekly chart performance for "911"
Chart (2020)	Peak position
Australia (ARIA)	76
Canada Hot 100 (Billboard)	85
Croatia (HRT)	54
France (SNEP)	141
Greece (IFPI)	81
Italy (FIMI)	92
Lithuania (AGATA)	61
New Zealand Hot Singles (RMNZ)	5
Portugal (AFP)	84
San Marino (SMRRTV Top 50)	9
Scottish Singles Sales (Official Charts)	64
UK Singles Downloads (Official Charts)	98
US Bubbling Under Hot 100 (Billboard)	1
US Hot Dance/Electronic Songs (Billboard)	10
US Rolling Stone Top 100	87

Weekly chart performance for "911 (Charli XCX and A. G. Cook remix)"
Chart (2021)	Peak position
New Zealand Hot Singles (RMNZ)	34
US Hot Dance/Electronic Songs (Billboard)	14

=== Year-end charts ===
2020 year-end chart performance for "911"
Chart (2020)	Position
US Hot Dance/Electronic Songs (Billboard)	27

== Certifications ==
Certifications for "911"
Region	Certification	Certified units/sales
Australia (ARIA)	Gold	35,000^{‡}
Brazil (Pro-Música Brasil)	Diamond	160,000^{‡}
Italy (FIMI)	Gold	35,000^{‡}
^{‡} Sales+streaming figures based on certification alone.

== Release history ==
Release dates and formats for "911"
Region	Date	Format(s)	Version	Label(s)	Ref.
France	September 18, 2020	Radio airplay	Original	Universal	
Italy	September 25, 2020	Radio airplay	Original	Universal	
New Zealand	October 4, 2020	Radio airplay	Original	Interscope; Universal	
Various	December 4, 2020	Digital download; streaming	Bruno Martini remixes	Interscope	
Various	December 4, 2020	Digital download; streaming	Sofi Tukker remixes	Interscope	
Various	December 4, 2020	Digital download; streaming	WEISS remix	Interscope	
