= Nick Logan =

British journalist and magazine editor (born 1947)

- Born: 3 January 1947 (age 78); Lincoln, Lincolnshire, England
- Occupation(s): Journalist, editor and publisher
- Known for: Founded The Face magazine

Nick Logan (born 3 January 1947 in Lincoln, Lincolnshire) is an English journalist, editor and publisher.

Logan is best known for having founded The Face, the magazine that forged a new "lifestyle" sector in British publishing in the 1980s and 1990s.

He was editor of the New Musical Express (NME) during its 1970s heyday and created a slew of other titles alongside The Face: pop fortnightly Smash Hits, men's magazines Arena, Arena Homme + and Deluxe and women's publication Frank.

== Early life ==
One of four children born to John and Doris Logan, Nick Logan was brought up in east London neighbourhoods Leytonstone and Wanstead, and attended Leyton County High School for Boys. He married Julie Hillier (1947–2016) in October 1967, and has three children.

== Journalism ==
Logan started his career in 1963 as a reporter at the West Essex Gazette & Walthamstow Guardian series of local papers in east London, where he was given responsibility for the pop pages. "I might have interviewed the Small Faces, who lived locally, or the drummer of the Nashville Teens, but it was all minor stuff", Logan said later.

=== New Musical Express ===
In 1967, Logan joined IPC's NME as one of five staff writers. The weekly was still reliant on the major stars of the earlier part of the decade such as the Beatles, and, as rock music supplanted pop and album sales overtook those of singles, NME lost ground to its rival Melody Maker, also published by IPC.

In 1972, IPC's management promoted Logan's colleague Alan Smith to editor and Logan as assistant editor with the brief of overhauling the content and design of the publication. Together they assembled a new editorial team drawn from the ranks of the underground and independently published press, including Charles Shaar Murray from Oz and Nick Kent and Pennie Smith from Frendz.

Logan assumed the editorship from Smith in 1973 at the age of 26, becoming the youngest national newspaper editor in the UK. His recruitment of the cream of young British writing talent, including Julie Burchill and Tony Parsons, resulted in the title becoming the pre-eminent music weekly of the period, with sales topping 180,000 copies a week.

=== Smash Hits ===
In 1978, Logan left the NME, determined to never again work in a corporate environment. He pitched several magazine ideas to the printing company East Midlands Allied Press, which was developing its magazine division Emap.

Among these was the proposal for a colourful teenage pop monthly, which was test-marketed in the north-east of England in the autumn of 1978 as Smash Hits. "My interest was in featuring excellent photography with song lyrics as ballast and bringing good acts like the Jam to a young audience," Logan said later.

Encouraged by the test-marketing exercise Emap put the first issue into national circulation; over the next couple of months sales increased to above 100,000 and the publisher reached agreement with Logan to switch to fortnightly publication.

Smash Hits' circulation rapidly rose to 166,000 copies, just 35,000 fewer than the NME and 10,000 more than Melody Maker, but by the autumn of 1979 Logan was ready to move on. Journalist Ian Cranna became editor and Logan, in his role as editorial director, proposed a new magazine – "a well-produced, well-designed and well-written monthly with music at its core but with expanding coverage of the subjects that informed it, from fashion and film to nightclubbing and social issues". When Emap's directors passed on the proposal, Logan and his wife decided to go it alone and invest £3,500 savings into the new title, which he named The Face.

=== The Face ===
Initially working out of the Smash Hits offices in Carnaby Street, central London, and using the off-the-shelf corporate entity Wagadon, which he had formed for his business relationship with Emap, Logan published the first issue of The Face on 1 May 1980. Featuring a logo designed by Steve Bush, with whom Logan had worked on Smash Hits, and a portrait by photographer Chalkie Davies of Jerry Dammers of the Specials on the front cover, this issue sold 56,000 copies. Sales levelled over the next six months, but a fillip was provided by alliance with what would become London's New Romantic scene via articles written by young journalist Robert Elms with photographs by Derek Ridgers, Virginia Turbett and others.

The publication of lookalike rivals such as New Sounds, New Styles and Blitz, and the launch of i-D magazine, confirmed Logan had established a new publishing sector.

He moved into the first of a series of offices of his own in central London. Subsequently, Logan recruited young designer Neville Brody as art director in 1981, placing the magazine ahead of the pack visually. Brody drew on such early 20th-century art and design movements as Constructivism to create a stark new visual language, which would define certain visual aspects of 1980s Britain.

The style pages of The Face meanwhile set the pace for the wider fashion world, particularly those produced by the Buffalo collective, led by stylist Ray Petri and including photographer Jamie Morgan.

In the 1980s, Logan's innovations at The Face included the November 1983 "New Life in Europe" issue, a co-production with nine continental European magazines including France's Actuel, and the 100th edition of September 1988, which incorporated a tri-fold on the front that featured the covers of every magazine published thus far.

In 1990, shortly before being awarded the inaugural Marcus Morris Award for magazine innovation, Logan was diagnosed with cancer of the jaw and forced to take a nine-month sabbatical from work. On recovery he became editorial director at Wagadon, with Sheryl Garratt as editor of The Face and Dylan Jones editing Arena.

In this period art director Phil Bicker, who had succeeded Neville Brody and Robin Derrick, actively pursued working relationships with young experimental photographers, including Corinne Day, Stephane Sednaoui, Nigel Shafran and David Sims, as well as stylists such as Melanie Ward.

Bicker's decision to make the unknown 16-year-old Kate Moss "the face of The Face" gave the supermodel her first exposure, particularly on the front of the July 1990 issue entitled "The 3rd Summer of Love".

In May 1992, a High Court jury found in favour of a libel claim by Jason Donovan that The Face had imputed he was gay when he was not and awarded the pop performer £200,000 in damages and costs. The singer later reduced the amount to £95,000 to be paid over several months and a fund was set up for readers and supporters.

Under Sheryl Garratt's direction, with assistance from her successor Richard Benson and other writers including Lindsay Baker, Ashley Heath, Gavin Hills and Amy Raphael, The Face reflected the developments in club culture, fashion and what became known as Britart as well as musical genres such as jungle and Britpop.

By this time the magazine's art direction and design team of Stuart Spalding and Lee Swillingham were showcasing such emerging photographic talents as Inez and Vinoodh and Norbert Schoerner.

The biggest selling issue of The Face was published in October 1995. With Robbie Williams on the cover, it sold 128,000 copies.

After Logan launched new titles Frank and Deluxe, Richard Benson became editorial director of Wagadon in 1998. His successor as editor of The Face was Adam Higginbotham, who in turn was succeeded by Johnny Davis in spring 1999.

In July 1999, amid plummeting circulation figures and aggressive competition from such titles as Loaded and Dazed & Confused, Logan sold Wagadon to Emap, which absorbed The Face, Arena and Arena Homme + into its lifestyle division

=== The Face at Emap ===
While Benson did not join Emap, Johnny Davis and Ashley Heath were among the team who made the transfer. In 2002, Davis was succeeded as editor by Neil Stevenson, co-founder of the Popbitch gossip website. By the spring of 2004 monthly sales had slipped to 40,000 copies and Emap consumer division head Paul Keenan announced the magazine's closure. The final issue was published in May 2004.

=== Arena ===
In autumn 1986 Logan published the first issue of men's magazine Arena; he was editor, with Dylan Jones, who had previously been at i-D, as assistant editor, Neville Brody as art director and Steve Taylor as contributing editor.

Arena was initially a biannual before becoming a quarterly. Later it was published 10 times a year. Dylan Jones succeeded Logan as editor in 1990 and Robin Derrick became art editor. Kathryn Flett assumed the role of editor of Arena from 1992 to 1995 and was succeeded by Peter Howarth. Ekow Eshun moved across from The Face to take Howarth's place in February 1997 until the sale of Wagadon in July 1999. The last issue of Arena was published in 2009.

=== Frank ===
Pitched as "an intelligent women's magazine", Logan published the first issue of Frank in September 1997 having appointed Tina Gaudoin as editor with Lisa Markwell as deputy editor and Harriet Quick as features editor. The first issue sold 120,000 copies and Gaudoin told the trade press that the publication would "fill the niche for the disenfranchised 25-year-old reader".

Frank failed to gain a toehold in the highly competitive market and after staff departures and office in-fighting Logan shuttered the magazine in the spring of 1999.

Latterly, the magazine has been seen to have pioneered more thoughtful and unpatronising journalism for women. Writer Lou Stoppard has declared Frank "really ahead of its time".

=== Deluxe ===
Deluxe was conceived as a more sophisticated magazine for young men who were then being targeted with such "New Lad" titles as FHM, Loaded and Maxim, based on a proposal by Andrew Harrison, a contributor to The Face who Logan appointed editor.

"Deluxe is here because a group of people got tired of being told that the same clapped-out subjects were the be-all and end-all of men's interests," announced Harrison prior to the publication of the first issue in May 1998.

Deluxe failed to achieve circulation close to the 150,000 target that had been set for it. A redesign after four issues failed to turn around its fortunes and Logan decided to close the title in December 1998 with advertising manager Rod Sopp citing lacklustre sales.

== Later life ==
After selling Wagadon, Nick Logan retired from publishing.

In 2012, he contributed the catalogue introduction to the exhibition Lloyd Johnson: The Modern Outfitter.

Between 2012 and 2017 Logan worked with author Paul Gorman on his book The Story Of The Face: The Magazine That Changed Culture.

In November 2017, Logan took part in the in-conversation event The Story Of The Face at Central Saint Martin's, London.

Logan divides his time between London and Portugal.

== Legacy of The Face ==
In 2011, DJ Giles Field donated his complete run of The Face issues to the permanent collection of London's Design Museum.

In November 2017, Thames & Hudson published Paul Gorman's The Story Of The Face: The Magazine That Changed Culture, with a foreword by Dylan Jones and contributions from Nick Logan.

Media offices
Preceded by Alan Smith	Editor of the NME; 1972–1978	Succeeded by Neil Spencer
Preceded by New publication	Editor of Smash Hits; 1978–1979	Succeeded by Ian Cranna
Preceded by New publication	Editor of The Face; 1980–1990	Succeeded by Sheryl Garratt
