= Schoerner =

Schoerner is a surname. Notable people with the surname include:

- Norbert Schoerner (born 1966), German photographer and filmmaker

== See also ==
- Ferdinand Schörner (1892–1973), German military commander
