= Robin Derrick =

British creative director and photographer (born 1962)

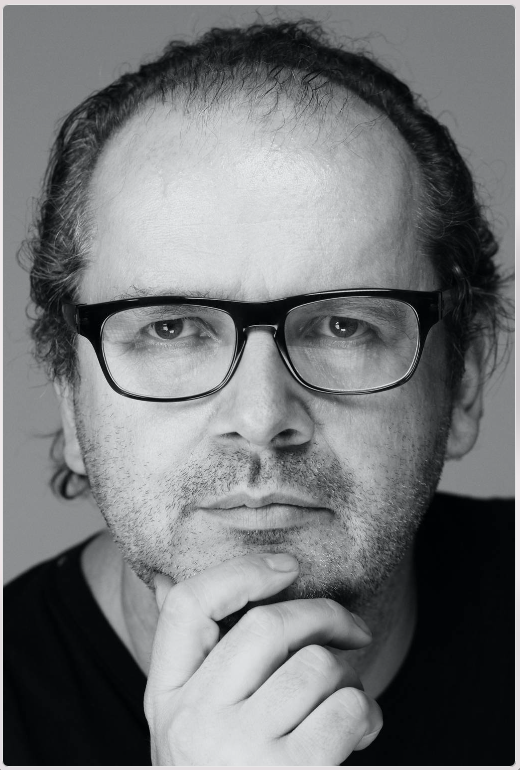
- Born: 29 May 1962 (age 64)
- Education: Central Saint Martins
- Occupations: Creative director, photographer and designer
- Years active: 1984–present
- Notable credit(s): British Vogue, i-D, Giorgio Armani, Spring Studios
- Spouse: Lisa Eldridge (m.2007)
- Children: 2

Robin Derrick (born 29 May 1962) is a British creative director, photographer and designer, best known for his roles as creative director of British Vogue and for launching international editions of the magazine. He also served as Creative Director of Italian Elle, The Face, Arena and Glamour France.

He worked for global fashion and beauty brands, including Giorgio Armani and Estée Lauder, and served as Global Executive Creative Director at Spring Studios.

== Career ==
Robin Derrick attended Central Saint Martins, in 1982, with a degree in graphic design, the same year as John Galliano. There, he met Terry Jones, co-founder and editor-in-chief of i-D magazine. He joined the design team of the magazine adding a layer of bitmapped computer graphics and it was at i-D that Derrick discovered his passion for editorial design.

In 1984, he joined The Face magazine, alongside Neville Brody, shaping its ground-breaking visual identity and establishing it as a style and fashion bible of its generation. Derrick forged links with photographers such as Nick Knight, Mario Testino, and Juergen Teller, who have all become leaders in their fields.

In 1986, Derrick became a contributing editor for the launch of the men's magazine Arena. A year later, he was approached by Carla Sozzani, and together they launched Italian Elle with Derrick as Art Director. He brought on his photographer friends, including Steven Meisel, Paolo Roversi, Sarah Moon, Bruce Weber, Peter Lindbergh, and more.

Returning to London in 1993, Derrick joined British Vogue as Art Director and later as Creative Director. During his 19 years at the magazine, he achieved the highest-selling issue in its history, as well as Campaign magazine's "Cover of the Year". He created numerous iconic covers with Kate Moss, Naomi Campbell, Linda Evangelista, Liz Hurley, and Princess Diana. Meanwhile, Derrick continued to bring in photography recruits such as Craig McDean, Mert and Marcus, Patrick Demarchelier, Lachlan Bailey, Emma Summerton, Terry Richardson, and artists like Marc Quinn, Tracey Emin, and Sam Taylor Wood.

In 2005, Derrick began working as a contributing Creative Director at Giorgio Armani, overseeing campaigns for fashion, accessories, fragrance, and beauty.

Meanwhile, Derrick officially joined Spring Studios as Global Executive Creative Director in 2011, overseeing the agency’s creative output across offices in London, New York, and Milan. There, he helped innovate and elevate some of luxury fashion and beauty's biggest brands into the new era of digital and e-commerce. The creative agency had clients such as Estée Lauder, Tom Ford, Kiko, Calvin Klein, Versus Versace, Harper's Bazaar US, Porter Magazine, and more.

Derrick currently serves as creative director at The Fashion Awards, as well as consultant creative director and acting MD for Lisa Eldridge Beauty.

== Awards ==
Derrick is a two-time winner of the PPA Magazine Designer of the Year Award.

== Photo books ==
- Robin Derrick, Robin Muir, Vogue Model, Little, Brown Book Group, 2010, ISBN 9781408702536
- Robin Derrick and Robin Muir, Vogue Covers: On Fashion's Front Page, Little, Brown Book Group, 2008; Little, Brown Book Group, 2010, ISBN 9781408702130
- Robin Derrick and Robin Muir, People in Vogue: A Century of Portraits, Little, Brown Book Group, 2005, ISBN 9780316731140
- Robin Derrick and Robin Muir, Unseen Vogue: The Secret History of Fashion Photography, Little, Brown Book Group, 2004, ISBN 9780316727662

== Family ==
Derrick is married to makeup artist Lisa Eldridge; they have two sons and three cats.
