= The Face (magazine) =

British youth culture magazine

- Cover of the Spring 2026 issue, Kai Schreiber by Oliver Hadlee Pearch
- Categories: Youth culture
- Frequency: Quarterly
- Founder: Nick Logan
- First issue: May 1980; 46 years ago
- Company: Wagadon (1980–1999); Emap (1999–2004); Wasted Talent Media (2019–2026); C86 Holdings (2026–present)
- Country: United Kingdom
- Based in: London
- Language: English
- Website: theface.com
- ISSN: 0263-1210

The Face (stylised in all caps) is a British quarterly youth culture magazine that covers popular culture, fashion, music, beauty, society, and lifestyle. Under the control of Wagadon from 1980 to 1999, Emap until 2004, Wasted Talent Media from 2019 to 2026, since 2026 C86 Holdings has owned the title. Following 2026 sale to C86 Holdings publication of The Face is on hold. Previous editors include Nick Logan and Adam Higginbotham, among others.

The Face began publication in 1980. It ceased publication in 2004 and was revived in 2019, it was saved from closure in 2026 following its acquisition by C86 Holdings.

The Face China launched in 2026 as the first international edition of the magazine.

== Background ==
The Face is a British quarterly youth culture magazine founded in 1980 by Nick Logan.

First published under Wagadon. In 1999 the title was absorbed by Emap and the original run would cease publication in 2004. In 2017, Wasted Talent acquired the rights from Bauer Media Group (who acquired Emap in 2008) and The Face relaunched in 2019 as a quarterly magazine. Due to financial losses The Face once again ceased publication in 2026, it was then sold to C86 Holdings who intend to relaunch the title.

=== Editors ===
Editor-in-Chief	Start year	End year
Original (1980–2004)
Nick Logan	1980	1990
Sheryl Garratt	1990	1995
Richard Benson	1995	1998
Adam Higginbotham	1998	1999
Johnny Davis	1999	2002
Neil Stevenson	2002	2004
Revival (2019–2026)
Stuart Brumfitt	2019	2020
Matthew Whitehouse	2020	2025

== History ==
=== Proposal ===
Logan left the NME after five years as editor in 1978 and launched Smash Hits for Emap, the magazine division of printing company East Midlands Allied Press.

In the autumn of 1979, with Smash Hits' circulation at 166,000 copies Logan proposed a new magazine – "a well-produced, well-designed and well-written monthly with music at its core but with expanding coverage of the subjects that informed it, from fashion and film to nightclubbing and social issues".

When Emap's directors passed on the proposal, Logan and his wife decided to go it alone and invest £3,500 savings into the new title, which he named The Face.

=== 1980s ===
Initially working out of Smash Hits' Soho office, Logan founded Wagadon, a small independent publishing house, in the early 1980s. The first issue of its new magazine The Face came out on 1 May 1980.

Featuring a logo designed by Steve Bush, with whom Logan had worked on Smash Hits, and a portrait by photographer Chalkie Davies of Jerry Dammers of The Specials on the front cover, this issue sold 56,000 copies. Sales levelled over the next six months, but a fillip was provided by alliance with London's burgeoning New Romantic scene via articles written by young journalist Robert Elms with photographs by Derek Ridgers, Virginia Turbett and others.

The publication of lookalike rivals such as New Sounds, New Styles and Blitz and the launch of i-D magazine confirmed Logan had established a new publishing sector.

He moved into the first of a series of offices of his own in central London. Subsequently, Logan recruited young designer Neville Brody as art director in 1982, placing the magazine ahead of the pack visually. Brody drew on such early 20th century art and design movements as Constructivism to create a stark new visual language which would define certain visual aspects of 1980s Britain.

The style pages of The Face meanwhile set the pace for the wider fashion world, particularly those produced by the Buffalo collective, led by stylist Ray Petri and including photographer Jamie Morgan.

In the 1980s, Logan's innovations at The Face included the November 1983 "New Life in Europe" issue, a co-production with nine continental European magazines including France's Actuel, and the 100th edition of September 1988 which incorporated a tri-fold on the front which featured the covers of every magazine published till then.

=== 1990s ===
In 1990, shortly before being awarded the inaugural Marcus Morris Award for magazine innovation, Logan was diagnosed with cancer of the jaw and forced to take a nine-month sabbatical. On recovery he became editorial director at Wagadon, with Sheryl Garratt as editor of The Face and Dylan Jones editing companion title Arena.

In this period art director Phil Bicker, who had succeeded Neville Brody and Robin Derrick, actively pursued working relationships with young experimental photographers, including Corinne Day, Ellen Von Unwerth, Stephane Sednaoui, Nigel Shafran, David Sims, Juergen Teller and Mark Aleksy as well as stylists such as Melanie Ward.

Bicker's decision to make the unknown 16-year-old Kate Moss "the face of The Face" gave the supermodel her first exposure, particularly on the front of the July 1990 issue entitled "The 3rd Summer of Love".

In May 1992, a High Court jury found in favour of a libel claim by Jason Donovan that The Face had implied he was gay when he was not, and awarded the pop performer £292,000 in damages and costs. The singer later reduced the amount to £95,000 to be paid over several months and a fund was set up for readers and supporters.

Under Sheryl Garratt's direction with assistance from her successor Richard Benson and other writers including Lindsay Baker, Ashley Heath, Gavin Hills and Amy Raphael, The Face reflected the developments in club culture, fashion and what became known as Britart as well as musical genres including grunge, jungle and Britpop. By this time, the magazine's art direction and design team of Stuart Spalding and Lee Swillingham were showcasing such emerging photographic talents as Inez and Vinoodh, Sean Ellis and Norbert Schoerner.

The biggest selling issue of The Face was published in October 1995. With Robbie Williams on the cover, it sold 128,000 copies.

After Logan launched new titles Frank and Deluxe, Richard Benson became editorial director of Wagadon in 1998. His successor as editor of The Face was Adam Higginbotham who in turn was succeeded by Johnny Davis in spring 1999.

=== Sale to Emap, decline, and closure (1999–2004) ===
In July 1999 amid plummeting circulation figures and aggressive competition from such titles as Loaded and Dazed & Confused, Logan sold Wagadon to Emap, which absorbed The Face, Arena and Arena Homme + into its lifestyle division

While Benson did not join Emap, Johnny Davis and Ashley Heath were among the team who made the transfer. In 2002 Davis was succeeded as editor by Neil Stevenson, co-founder of the Popbitch gossip website. By the spring of 2004 monthly sales had slipped to 40,000 copies and Emap consumer division head Paul Keenan announced the magazine's closure. It was reported at the time that Jason Donovan had formed a consortium to look at buying the title from Emap in an effort to save it, but the plan came to nothing. The final issue was published in May 2004. Rights to the title passed to Bauer Media Group when it acquired Emap in 2008.

=== Under Wasted Talent Media and revival (2017–present) ===
In 2017, The Face was acquired by independent publisher Wasted Talent Media, home of Kerrang! and Mixmag, which announced plans to relaunch the magazine.

In March 2019, Wasted Talent's Jerry Perkins, who was a publisher at Bauer and its predecessor Emap, announced that the title would be relaunched online at theface.com in April 2019 and return as a print quarterly in late summer 2019, with Stuart Brumfitt as the editor. The first physical issue of the relaunched magazine was published on 13 September 2019, with a choice of four covers featuring contemporary celebrities Harry Styles, Dua Lipa, Rosalía and Tyler, the Creator.

== The Face China ==
Following the release of the final cover of the revival-era in April 2026, The Face China launched on digital platforms, the first international spin-off of the magazine. Taiyu Zhang is the editor-in-chief of the title.

== Legacy ==
In 2011, The Face was added to the permanent collection of the Design Museum, London.

The Face was featured in the following exhibitions at London's Victoria and Albert Museum:

- Postmodernism: Style and Subversion 1970–1990 (2011).
- British Design From 1948: Innovation in the Modern Age (2012).
- Club To Catwalk: London Fashion in the 1980s (2013/14)

== The Story of the Face ==
The history of the magazine during Nick Logan's ownership 1980–1999 is told in Paul Gorman's book The Story of the Face: The Magazine That Changed Culture, published by Thames & Hudson in November 2017.

== See also ==
- Ray Gun (magazine)
- Emigre (magazine)
- Print (magazine)
