= Free Woman =

2021 single by Lady Gaga

- Honey Dijon remix single cover

Single by Lady Gaga

from the album Chromatica
- Released: April 13, 2021
- Studio: Conway, EastWest (Hollywood); Good Father (Los Angeles)
- Genre: Eurohouse; Eurodance; EDM
- Length: 3:11
- Label: Interscope
- Songwriters: Lady Gaga; BloodPop; Axel Hedfors; Johannes Klahr
- Producers: BloodPop; Axwell; Klahr

Lady Gaga singles chronology
"911" (2020)	"Free Woman" (2021)	"I Get a Kick Out of You" (2021)

Audio video
- "Free Woman" on YouTube

"Free Woman" is a song by American singer and songwriter Lady Gaga recorded for her sixth studio album Chromatica (2020). Gaga co-wrote it with the song's producers BloodPop, Axwell and Johannes Klahr. "Free Woman" was released as the album's fifth track, several weeks after a high-quality demo version of the song was leaked onto the Internet. It is a Eurohouse and Eurodance song that draws influences from the music of the 1990s. Gaga was inspired by her real life events; the song talks about her coping with post-traumatic stress disorder (PTSD), from which she suffered after being sexually assaulted by a music producer. Gaga also wanted to celebrate her LGBT+ fans; she wrote the song especially with the trans community in mind. The song's lyrics talk about reclaiming one's identity and answer the question "what does it mean to be a free woman?".

Many music critics highlighted the song for its strong, empowering lyrics, while some deemed its production generic. On April 13, 2021, "Free Woman" was released to radio in France as the fourth single from Chromatica. Honey Dijon and Clarence Clarity produced remix edits of the song; Clarity's version includes additional vocals by British singer Rina Sawayama and is included on Gaga's remix album Dawn of Chromatica (2021). "Free Woman" was part of the setlist of Gaga's 2022 stadium tour The Chromatica Ball, and was also included in Apple's GarageBand app and her commercial for Dom Pérignon champagne.

== Background and recording ==
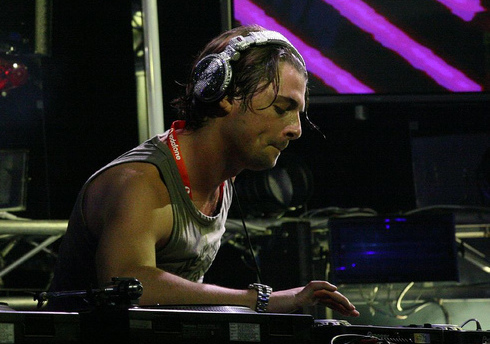
Axwell (pictured) co-wrote and produced "Free Woman".

Lady Gaga co-wrote "Free Woman" with the track's producers, BloodPop, Axwell and Johannes Klahr. BloodPop stated that Axwell's solo track "Nobody Else" influenced the creative direction, noting its driving energy and precise house-music production as qualities they sought to emulate on "Free Woman" and another track, "Alice". Axwell added that he appreciated the retro character of the song's early version, created by Gaga and BloodPop, explaining that it evoked for him the atmosphere of New York clubs in the 1990s. Klahr said they amplified the 1980s and 1990s influences and added their own stylistic elements to build on that foundation, and that with Gaga’s "lush vocals" they aimed to make the groove as fluid as possible to achieve an authentically club-oriented sound.

Gaga admitted that she was in a dark state of mind while writing the song, recalling that she sometimes felt she "was going to die" and therefore needed to "say something important". She added that completing the track helped her overcome those feelings, and that she now listens to it with the reassurance that she will survive. Talking with Zane Lowe on Apple Music, she discussed the song's personal background:

"I was sexually assaulted by a music producer. It’s compounded all of my feelings about life, feelings about the world, feelings about the industry, what I had to compromise and go through to get to where I am. I had to put it there. And when I was able to finally celebrate it, I said, 'You know what?' ... I’m no longer going to define myself as a 'survivor' or a victim of sexual assault. I am just a person who is free that went through some fucked up shit."

Gaga also said "Free Woman" was written with the trans community in mind. She wanted to acknowledge her own strength with the song while also celebrating the LGBT community, who helped her cope with PTSD and move forward. Gaga further revealed that she wanted to name the album after the song but instead chose Chromatica because she felt her internal struggles called into question the proposed title's integrity.

== Release and composition ==
"I ponder often why I chose to declare my womanhood in this song. I've realized that question is futile. Woman could be synonymous with any creative force. I'm proud of my womb, proud of yours, and proud of those who were born without wombs and have phantom ones. Every gender has a spirit womb. I believe this is hinged on creating with three things the same way a door has three hinges: a steady hand, knowing you can, and not needing a relationship to define your power. Before you know it you are closed, you can open, just like a door."

— Gaga talking about "Free Woman" on Spotify

On May 7, 2020, a high-quality leak of "Free Woman" surfaced on the Internet and became a trending topic on Twitter. Interscope Records swiftly removed all leaked versions of the song. Three days before the album's release, Gaga shared a promotional image with the lyrics "This is my dancefloor / I fought for", and the caption "THIS IS A MESSAGE FROM #CHROMATICA", on her Instagram account. Chromatica was released On May 29, 2020, with "Free Woman" included as the fifth track. On April 13, 2021, "Free Woman" was released to radio in France as the album's fourth single.

"Free Woman" is a 1990s-influenced Eurodance and Eurohouse song with elements of acid house and disco. It involves a mid-tempo gospel groove from a keyboard line. According to Alexandra Pollard of The Independent, there are similarities between the sounds of "Free Woman" and Robyn & La Bagatelle Magique's 2015 single "Love is Free", while Salvatore Maicki of Nylon compared it to the music of La Bouche. According to the sheet music published on Musicnotes.com, "Free Woman" is written in the time signature of common time and is composed in the key of A minor with a tempo of 120 beats per minute. The vocals range from the tonal nodes of A♭_{3} to E♭_{5}.

The song sees Gaga answer the question "what does it mean to be a free woman?" and challenges the need for a relationship with a man for her survival. Gaga says she can feel free on her own and "victoriously move[s] forward", saying "I'm still something if I don't got a man / I'm a free woman". According to Annie Zaleski of Time, the song is about reclaiming one's "identity and gender after a sexual assault", while Laura Alvarez from Forbes described the lyrics as a "battle with happiness due to life's adversities". Carl Wilson from Slate said the track "flashes back to Stefani Germanotta pre-Fame in New York" with the line "I walk the downtown, hear my sound / No one knows me yet, not right now".

== Critical reception ==
According to Jem Aswad from Variety, "Free Woman" "has a liberating and empowered feel and a rousing chorus". Jeremy J. Fisette from Beats Per Minute said the song "offers us a self-empowerment anthem we’ve all sort of heard before, but Gaga sells it with her moody melodies and strong vocals on the hook". USA Today's Patrick Ryan called it an "euphoric thumper". Slate's Carl Wilson wrote; "it's the wistfulness, and the little bit of musical theater in it, that make it more than a rote empowerment anthem". Mark Richardson from The Wall Street Journal said "Free Woman" "seems crafted for future Gay Pride celebrations, with lyrics that frame the dance floor as something communities have to fight for". Nick Smith of MusicOMH called the track "dancefloor empowerment at its finest". Adam White of The Independent said that while it doesn't reveal anything new through its autobiographical lyrics, the track's breezy synths and vocals make it one of Chromatica's few highlights.

Insider picked "Free Woman" as one of the best tracks of the album, saying it is "both a powerful statement and an irresistible pop anthem". Insider's Callie Ahlgrim highlighted "the blunt confidence" in the lyrics while Courteney Larocca described the song as "an intimate, triumphant exploration of healing and moving forward after enduring a sexual assault". Laura Dzubay of Consequence named it as one of the essential songs of the album, and appreciated the line "This is my dance floor / I fought for", saying it "carries a resonance beyond itself in this specific moment—dancing is almost always something fought for in one way or another, but particularly for those who have gone through traumatic experiences, and the power to create the space for dancing is never one to be taken lightly". Kory Grow from Rolling Stone highlighted the line "I'm still something if I don't got a man" for being "bold".

According to Stephen Daw of Billboard, the song "pales in comparison to the rest of the album's impressive track list". He also said; "The beat is certainly fun, the melody is definitely catchy, but there's nothing in the fabric of the song that passes the Gaga test of grabbing you by your shirt collar and refusing to let you go". Michael Cragg from The Guardian called it "generic" and "overworked". Sal Cinquemani from Slant Magazine also called the song generic and wrote it "sounds like a Cher outtake". According to Alessa Dominguez at BuzzFeed News, the track "adds nothing to the endless theme of letting loose on the dance floor". Louise Bruton from The Irish Times named "Free Woman" one of "the rare lows" on the album.

== Commercial performance ==
In the Billboard issue dated June 13, 2020, "Free Woman" debuted on the Bubbling Under Hot 100 Singles chart at number 2, and on the Hot Dance/Electronic Digital Songs at number eleven. Two weeks later, the song peaked at number ten, becoming Gaga's ninth top-10 song on Billboard's Dance/Electronic Songs chart, extending her mark for the most top 10s among female acts. In Canada, the song charted on the Canadian Hot 100 at number 80 in the issue dated June 13, 2020. "Free Woman" also debuted at number 75 on the Australian Singles Chart, at number 143 in France, at number 28 in Hungary, at number 89 in Lithuania, at number 100 in Portugal, and at number 93 in Sweden.

== Live performances and media appearances ==
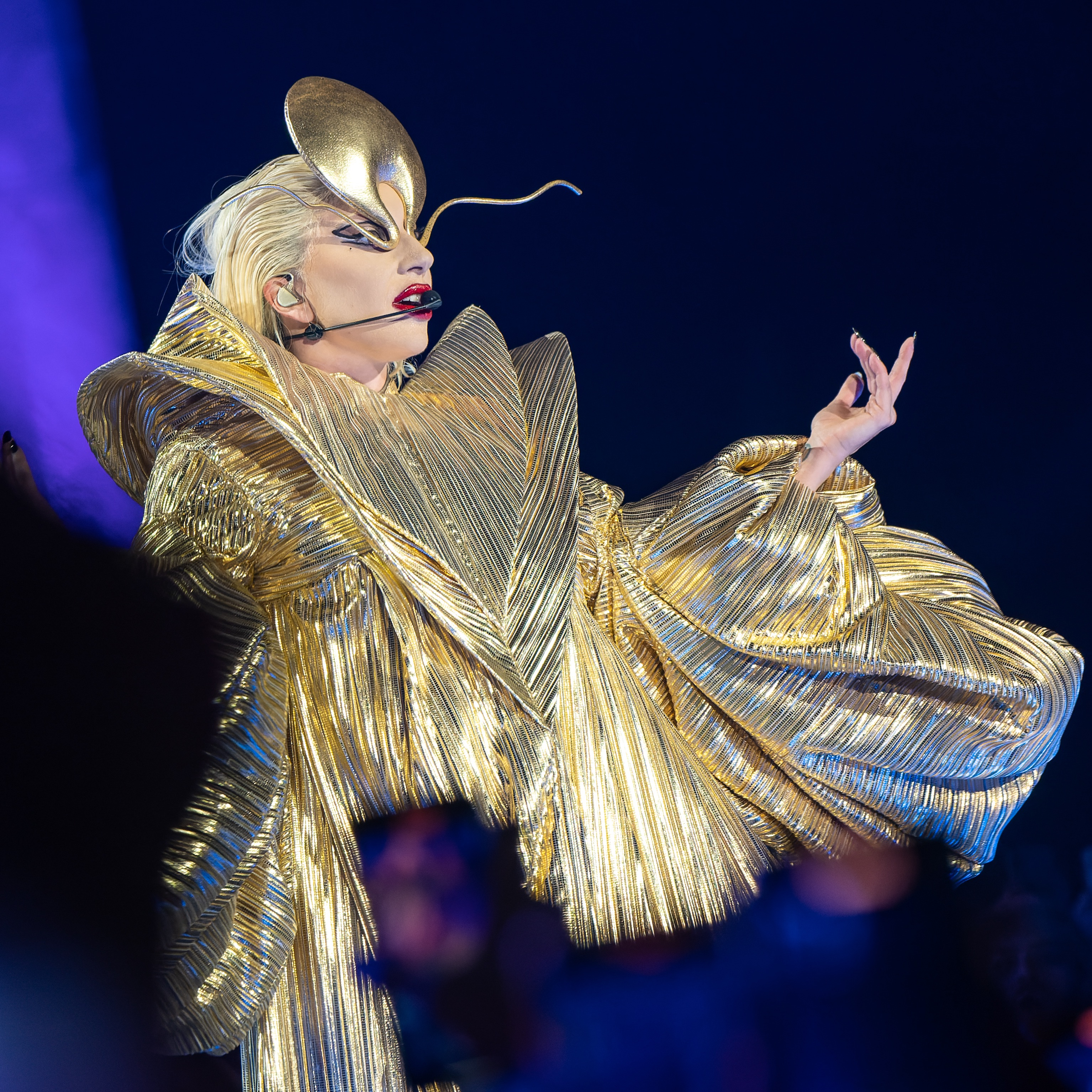
Gaga performing "Free Woman" on The Chromatica Ball tour

In 2022, Gaga performed "Free Woman" as part of The Chromatica Ball stadium tour while processioning through the audience between her main stage and a second, smaller stage. She was wearing a claw-like, gold headpiece by Philip Treacy and a poofy gold gown designed by her sister, Natali Germanotta. According to Neil McCormick of The Telegraph, Gaga delivered an "exuberant gospel vocal" during "Free Woman". Chicago Tribune's Bob Gendron said with her "Free Woman" performance, Gaga "promptly brought intimacy to a stadium environment by slowly parading through the crowd".

In April 2021, "Free Woman" was used in champagne brand Dom Pérignon's commercial, titled "The Queendom", which was filmed by Nick Knight and visualized by Nicola Formichetti. It shows Gaga holding a giant champagne bottle, making moves while blending with the background in swirling patterns of movement before joining a group of others for a toast. The following July, "Free Woman" was included in Apple's GarageBand app as a Remix Session sound pack along with step-by-step remix instructions and an "inspirational video" by Gaga, who said:

"GarageBand is my idea bank and where I start my songwriting, so I'm excited to make my song 'Free Woman' available as a Remix Session. I want musicians and music lovers to be able to see how a song is produced and be able to hear all the individual parts, and then put their own creative color on it, doing whatever they want in GarageBand."

== Remixes ==
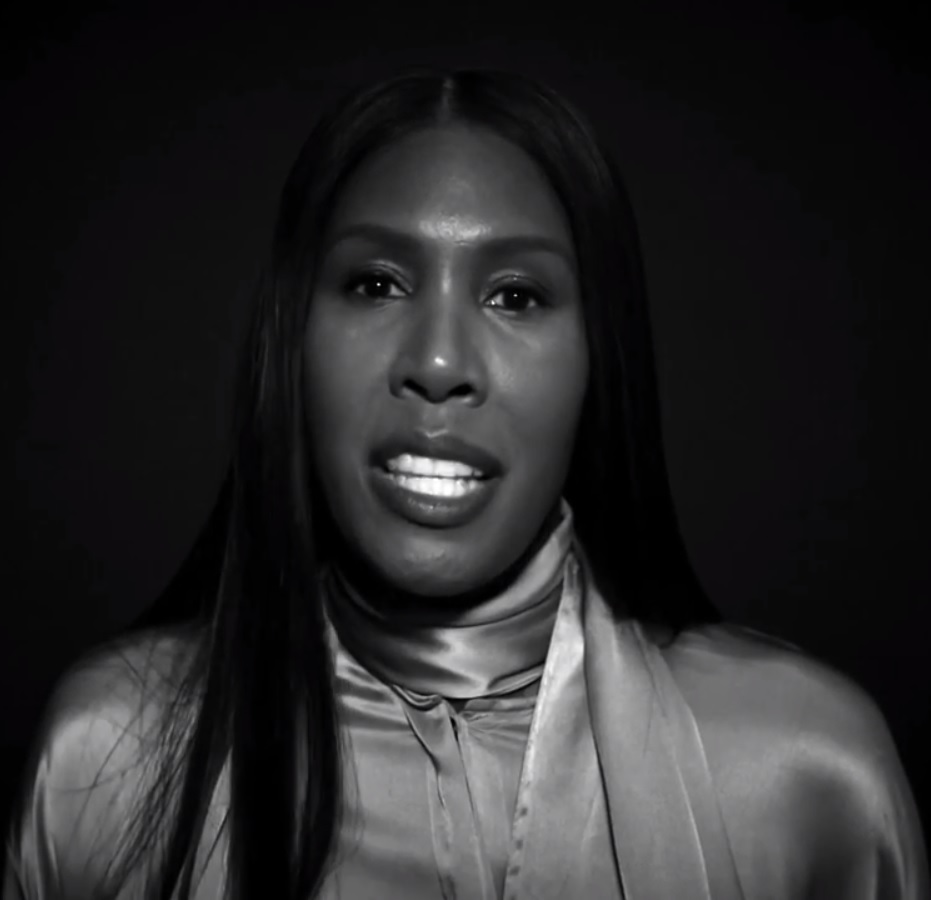
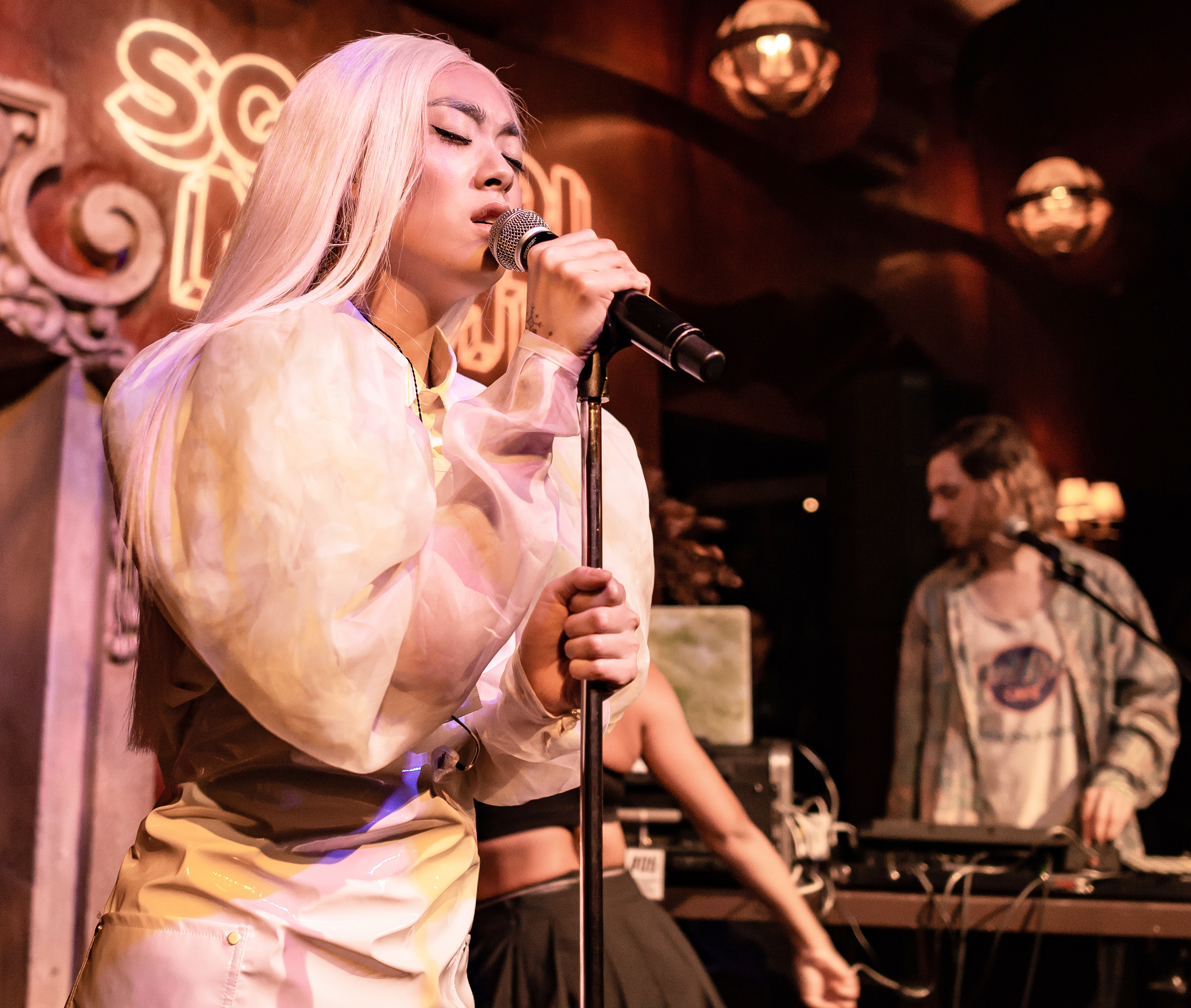
A Chicago house-inspired remix of "Free Woman" by Honey Dijon (pictured left) was released in August 2020, while a remix featuring Rina Sawayama (pictured right) appeared on the remix album, Dawn of Chromatica, in September 2021.

On August 28, 2020, a remix of "Free Woman" by Honey Dijon was released to celebrate the last episode of Gaga's weekly podcast on Apple Music, called Gaga Radio. Talking about their collaboration, Dijon said:

"I approach most of the people that I work with more from a cultural perspective than a mainstream priority. Because I think for me, Gaga has always been about the club and been about the LGBTQI community, and she's been a staunch supporter of that, and most of her music has been influenced by the clubs."

Dijon was initially asked to remix Gaga's duet with Ariana Grande, "Rain on Me", but felt "Free Woman" was a better fit for her because she envisioned a multicultural club atmosphere for her version of the song. Dijon chose the title "Realness Remix" because she wanted to pay tribute to the diverse club community. Dijon also saw her remix as an opportunity to showcase Chicago house for a mainstream audience.

On April 4, 2021, BloodPop teased the possibility of a Chromatica remix album and asked his Twitter followers to suggest artists they would like to see on such a project. He later replied to his tweet and tagged Japanese-British musician Rina Sawayama, who replied to it with a smirking emoji. During an interview at the 2021 Brit Awards, Sawayama talked about the project, stating; "The wish is on the internet, and I've done my bit, let's just say that. So, it's in the works." She also hinted the song on which she featured is "Free Woman". The remix album, titled Dawn of Chromatica, was released on September 3, 2021; it includes a "metal-edged" remix of the song by Sawayama and British producer Clarence Clarity. This version has influences of metal with wailing riffs and drum fills, which resembles Gaga's 2011 studio album Born This Way. Robin Murray from Clash called this version of the song "arena-worthy". Neil Z. Yeung of AllMusic named the remix one of the highlights of Dawn of Chromatica, saying Rina Sawayama "liberates 'Free Woman' with buoyant and inspirational flair". Sawayama performed this version of the song as part of the encore to The Dynasty Tour (2021–2022).

== Track listing ==
Digital download and streaming (Honey Dijon Realness Remix)

1. "Free Woman" (Honey Dijon Realness Remix Edit) – 3:31
2. "Free Woman" (Honey Dijon Realness Remix) – 6:46

== Credits and personnel ==
Credits adapted from Tidal.

- Lady Gaga – vocals, songwriter
- Axwell – producer, songwriter, bass, drums, guitar, keyboards, percussion
- BloodPop – producer, songwriter, bass, drums, guitar, keyboards, percussion
- Johannes Klahr – producer, songwriter, bass, drums, guitar, keyboards, percussion
- Burns – songwriter
- Scott Kelly – mix engineer
- Benjamin Rice – mixing
- Tom Norris – mixing

== Charts ==
=== Weekly charts ===
Weekly chart performance for "Free Woman"
Chart (2020)	Peak position
Australia (ARIA)	75
Canada Hot 100 (Billboard)	80
France (SNEP)	143
Hungary (Single Top 40)	28
Lithuania (AGATA)	89
New Zealand Hot Singles (RMNZ)	6
Portugal (AFP)	100
Sweden (Sverigetopplistan)	93
US Bubbling Under Hot 100 (Billboard)	2
US Hot Dance/Electronic Songs (Billboard)	10
US Rolling Stone Top 100	92

Weekly chart performance for "Free Woman (Rina Sawayama & Clarence Clarity remix)"
Chart (2021)	Peak position
US Hot Dance/Electronic Songs (Billboard)	20

=== Year-end charts ===
2020 year-end chart performance for "Free Woman"
Chart (2020)	Position
US Hot Dance/Electronic Songs (Billboard)	32

== Certifications ==
Certifications for "Free Woman"
Region	Certification	Certified units/sales
Brazil (Pro-Música Brasil)	Platinum	40,000^{‡}
^{‡} Sales+streaming figures based on certification alone.

== Release history ==
Release dates and formats for "Free Woman"
Region	Date	Format(s)	Version	Label	Ref.
Various	August 28, 2020	Digital download; streaming	Honey Dijon Realness remix	Interscope	
France	April 13, 2021	Radio airplay	Radio edit	Universal	
