= Chromatica =

2020 studio album by Lady Gaga

Studio album by Lady Gaga
- Released: May 29, 2020
- Recorded: 2017–2020
- Studios: Conway (Hollywood); EastWest (Hollywood); Electric Lady (New York City); Good Father (Los Angeles); Henson (Los Angeles); MXM (Los Angeles); Utility Muffin Research Kitchen (Hollywood Hills)
- Genres: Dance-pop; house
- Length: 43:08
- Language: English • Korean
- Labels: Streamline; Interscope
- Producers: Lady Gaga; BloodPop; Burns; Tchami; Morgan Kibby; Axwell; Johannes Klahr; Madeon; Skrillex

Lady Gaga chronology
| A Star Is Born (2018) | Chromatica (2020) | Dawn of Chromatica (2021) |

Singles from Chromatica
- 1. "Stupid Love" Released: February 28, 2020; 2. "Rain on Me" Released: May 22, 2020; 3. "911" Released: September 18, 2020; 4. "Free Woman" Released: April 13, 2021

Chromatica is the fifth solo studio album by American singer-songwriter Lady Gaga and her sixth overall. (Note: Chromatica is Gaga's sixth studio album when including her collaborative album with Tony Bennett, Cheek to Cheek (2014). Occasionally, her debut album The Fame (2008) and its reissue The Fame Monster (2009) are counted separately, which would make Chromatica her sixth solo album.) It was released on May 29, 2020, by Interscope Records and its subsidiary Streamline. Gaga supervised the production with longtime collaborator BloodPop and a variety of other producers to create the album. Musically, Chromatica is a dance-pop record inspired by early 1990s house music, returning Gaga to her dance music roots and eschewing the stripped-down style of its predecessors Joanne (2016) and A Star Is Born (2018). The album's visual aesthetic saw Gaga adopt a cyberpunk-inspired persona.

Chromatica is a concept album centering on ideas of unwavering happiness and the pursuit of healing. Songs on the record encompass themes inspired by failed romance and mental health struggles in Gaga's private life. The music is distinguished by dense synthesizers, percussion, grooves, and orchestral arrangements that merge overarching melodies. Blackpink, Ariana Grande, and Elton John contribute guest vocals. Most of the recording took place at Henson Recording Studios and Gaga's in-home Hollywood Hills studio. Interscope advertised Chromatica through product endorsements and TV partnerships, although the marketing campaign was adversely affected by the COVID-19 pandemic. To support the album, Gaga embarked on The Chromatica Ball concert series in July 2022, the first all-stadium tour of her career, after it was postponed twice due to the pandemic. It was commemorated in the 2024 HBO/Max special, Gaga Chromatica Ball.

Four singles supported the album, including the US Billboard Hot 100 top-five entry "Stupid Love", and "Rain on Me" with Grande, which marked Gaga's fifth number one song on the chart. "911" and "Free Woman" were released as singles in select countries. Chromatica was well received by music critics; the craftsmanship and treatment of the subject matter were praised, though the house production drew criticism from some. At the 63rd Annual Grammy Awards, Chromatica was nominated for Best Pop Vocal Album, and "Rain on Me" earned Gaga's second Best Pop Duo/Group Performance win. The album topped the charts in various countries, including the US, where it marked Gaga's sixth consecutive number-one on the Billboard 200. A remix album of Chromatica, titled Dawn of Chromatica, featuring an array of artists, was released on September 3, 2021.

== Background ==
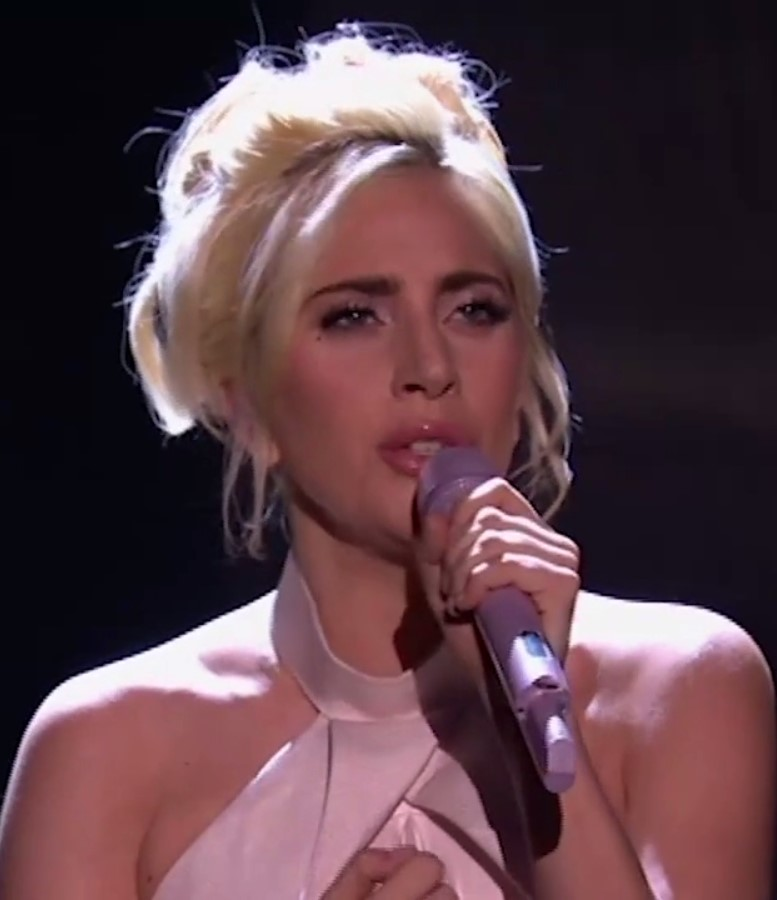
The Joanne era showcased Gaga (pictured in 2016) in a revamped stage persona emphasizing her vocal ability.

After the mixed response to Artpop (2013), American singer Lady Gaga re-emerged from the interim with a revamped stage persona emphasizing her vocal ability. Her jazz collaboration with Tony Bennett, Cheek to Cheek (2014), professional expansion, candid expression of her personal life in the media, and departure from her avant-garde visual style established the singer's rebranding, culminating with the release of her fifth studio album Joanne (2016). Joanne transcended the electronic sound of Gaga's repertoire by incorporating country and soft rock textures. Despite the album's somewhat more favorable reception, the media still questioned the authenticity of Gaga's output of music. Nevertheless, Joanne debuted as the artist's fourth consecutive chart-topping album in the US and spawned the multi-platinum single "Million Reasons".

Gaga provided brief insight on new material in interviews conducted before her final Dive Bar Tour show. She first arranged previews at Dive Bar and then her global Joanne World Tour, but scheduling conflicts, coupled with production constraints, halted the singer's pursuits. By the time she was contracted for A Star Is Born (2018), Gaga's progress on a standalone project intensified. Her existing commitment to A Star Is Born, however, soon took precedence, which meant the singer was unable to fully devote her attention to new material for another year.

Most of Chromatica's songwriting derives from Gaga's mental health struggles precipitated by her fame. In candid views of her personal life, the singer admitted to being in a "dark place" during the album's recording, remarking, "I felt threatened by the things my career brought into my life and the pace of my life. I spent a lot of time in a sort of catatonic state of just not wanting to do anything. And then I finally, slowly started to make music and tell my story through my record." The failure of Joanne to achieve catharsis for Gaga's grieving father and family, still in the fallout of her aunt's death, exacerbated the singer's depression. She therefore found writing Chromatica therapeutic. Gaga also drew upon her past relationships to shape the album's subject matter.

== Recording ==
"What I'm making now is a reminder of the freedom that I have as an artist, but also my absolute love for electronic music, my absolute love for the ability for a computer to make something that is so visceral and soulful."

— Gaga talking about the album on Apple Music

Chromatica is co-executive producer BloodPop's second album with Gaga. They detailed basic ideas but had no immediate professional commitment until a listening preview of a rough "Stupid Love" demo ignited their interest. The two recorded most of Chromatica at Gaga's in-home Hollywood Hills recording studio, previously owned by Frank Zappa, before coordinating their remaining sessions at the Henson Recording Studios. With no concise vision yet to reference, they experimented on a piano and developed the nascent sounds to their corresponding mood. Gaga and BloodPop ultimately imagined an album rooted in vintage early 1990s house, an approach first articulated from their exchange of ideas with Scottish pop producer Burns, an early collaborator with experience working the British acid house circuit. Gaga's reassurance in her music output marked an important transition in the recording process, though she faulted some of the difficulties of recording on her fibromyalgia. Devising more poignant lyrics was an intense process which posed another challenge because Gaga had to relive past trauma to achieve her desired result. The singer admits she was compelled to finish thanks to the camaraderie she developed with BloodPop.

Gaga said she and BloodPop assembled their team of producers based on their ingenuity. Experimental musician Sophie was Interscope's first choice; ultimately her demos did not make the final cut. Interscope also recruited Swedish House Mafia's Axwell, Skrillex, Artpop collaborator Madeon, Tchami, Boys Noize and Benjamin Rice for their services. They worked in equal roles in the formation of the music, creating between 50 and 100 tracks in total. The shared responsibilities meant that, according to Gaga, the producers did not become possessive over the work, and hence sustain rapport to realize the singer's ideas in various directions.

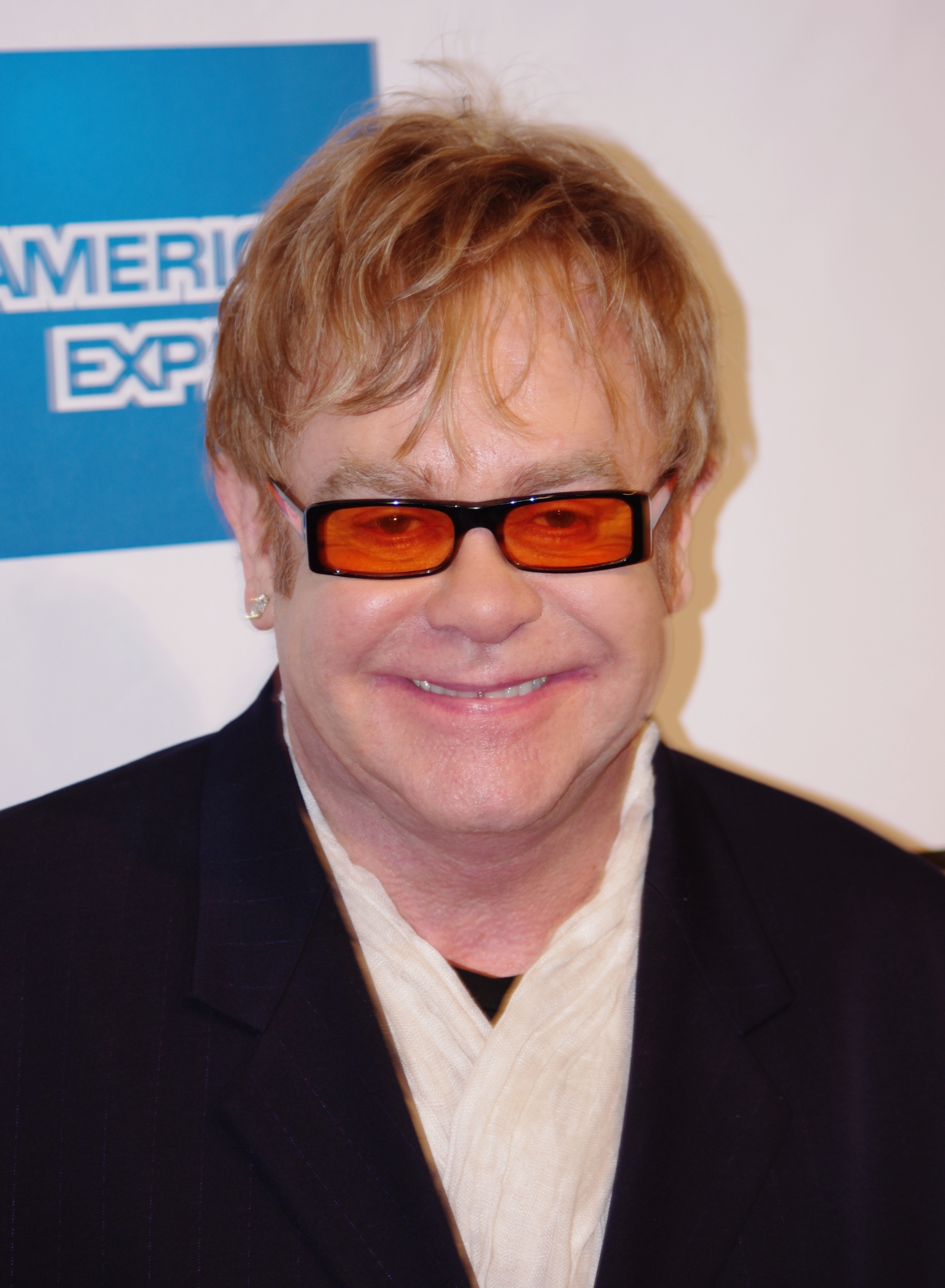
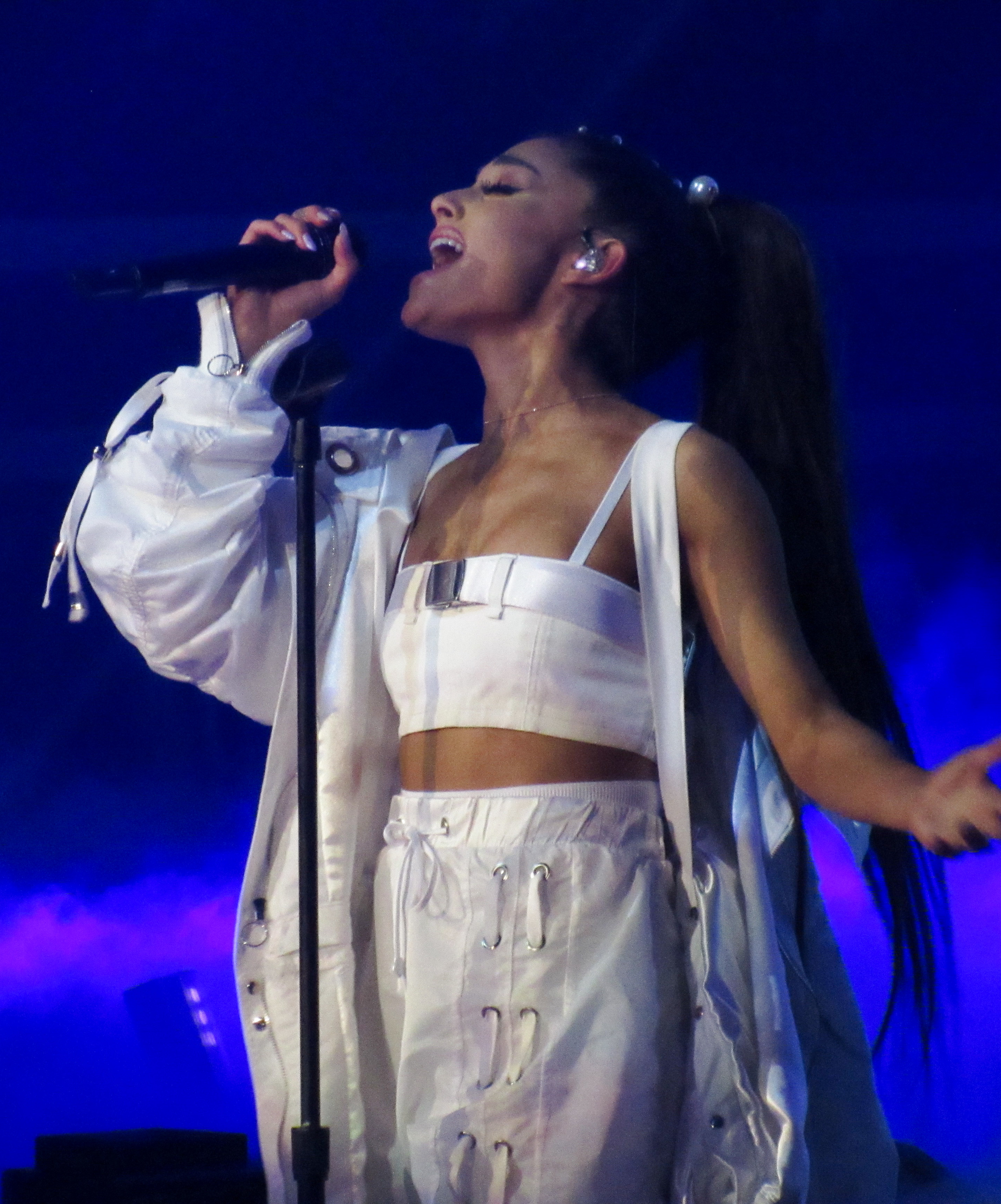
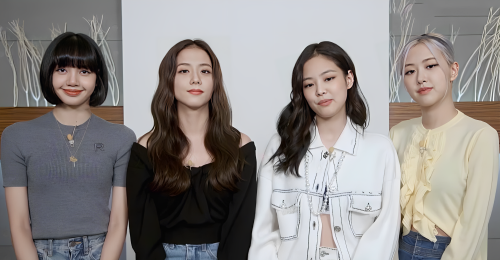
Chromatica features vocal contributions from Elton John, Ariana Grande, and Blackpink (clockwise, from top left).

Other key contributors on Chromatica are Ariana Grande, K-Pop girl group Blackpink and Elton John, hired as the album's vocal collaborators. "Rain on Me" sees Gaga and Grande unite by their shared plight in the media. Blackpink members sing English and Korean lyrics in the album's second collaboration, "Sour Candy". According to Gaga, they were eager to take up the task when she called them for the request. The starting point of the final track, "Sine from Above", was an initially unreleased track Axwell and John produced seven years before production. Gaga cites John, one of the singer's longtime mentors, as a driving force in her sobriety, and their friendship was an important factor in his hiring.

Once Chromatica took definite form, Gaga felt the completed work exuded a "cinematic" quality. She and BloodPop tapped musician Morgan Kibby to compose three orchestral interludes to coalesce Chromatica's melodic themes. They spent about two weeks creating the interludes, first researching source material the producers felt embodied the spectacle they envisioned for the album, before recording with a 26-person orchestra. Kibby said the main melodic themes explore resilience and the battle between dark and light. The producers completed the compositions merely days before they were scheduled to master Chromatica.

== Title and artwork ==
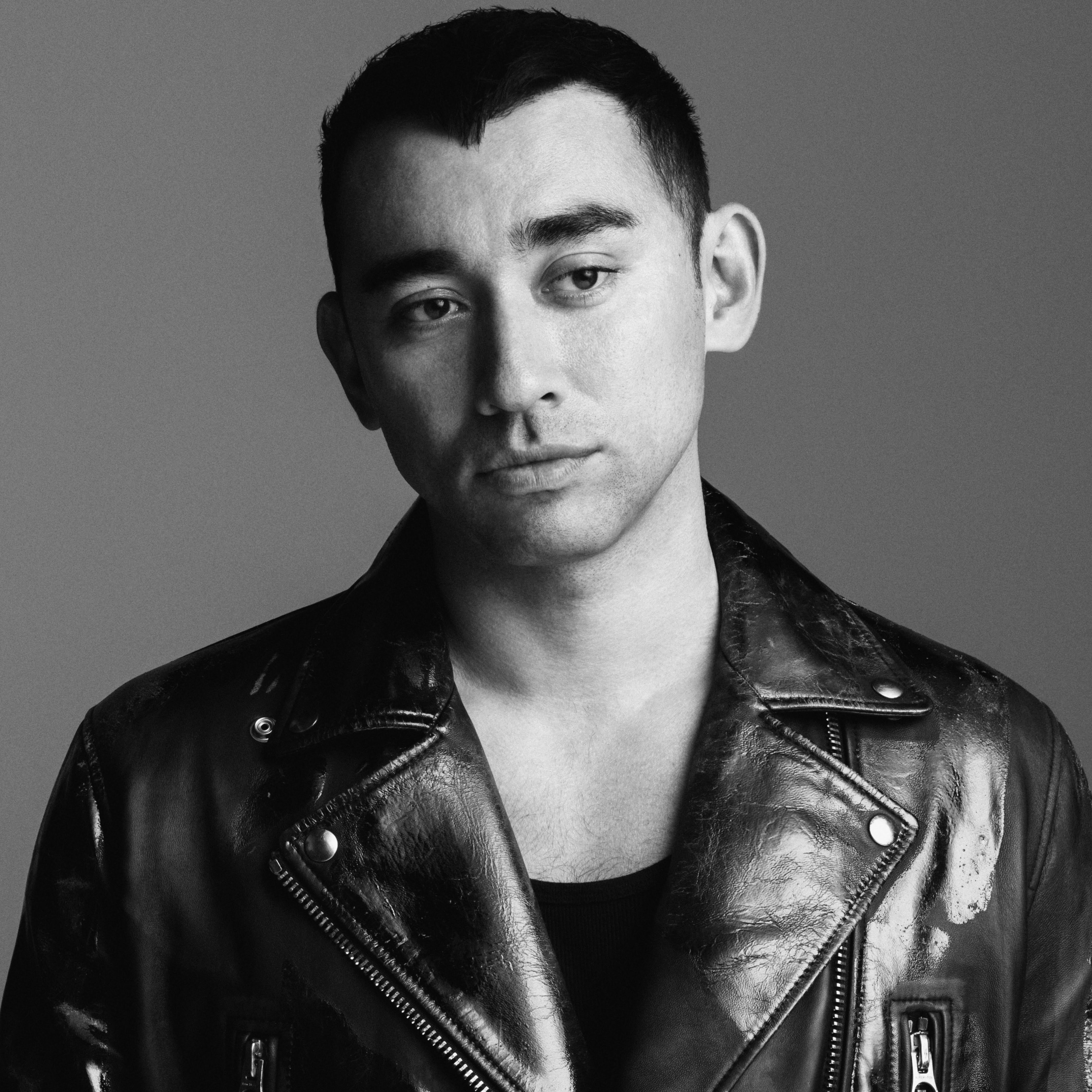
Longtime Gaga collaborator Nicola Formichetti oversaw the artistic direction for the cover shoot.

Gaga proposed Free Woman as a tentative working title from her fondness of the identically named album track, but the singer felt her internal struggles called into question the proposed title's integrity. She instead chose Chromatica for the title of her project, the product of her concept of a distant fantastical planet of in-fighting warrior tribes that come together for healing and peace through dance. Gaga describes the synthesis of color and sound as the framework for planet Chromatica and her shared vision with BloodPop. She remarked, "We're talking about inclusivity and life, and also a lot of what we see around us and what we're experiencing is math, which is very much like music and sound is math as well. So we talked about that, and then I sort of went back and I said, 'OK, well, yeah, it's inclusivity but it's really a way of thinking', it's not just, 'Oh, Chromatica, we're being inclusive with all the colors, all the people', and when I say, 'All the colors, all the people', I mean way more than we could possibly fathom." Gaga re-emerged for the album cycle with a flamboyant cyberpunk-inspired stage persona, continuing her trademark of artistic reinvention.

Interscope assigned veteran photographer Norbert Schoerner the responsibility of shooting Chromatica's front cover photo. A small crew of independent artists undertook wardrobe design under the supervision of longtime Gaga collaborator Nicola Formichetti, who oversaw the shoot's artistic direction. The producers sourced most pieces of Gaga's wardrobe from Spanish designer Cecilio Castrillo. Chromatica's cover, released to the press in early April 2020, features Gaga costumed in hot pink hair, a studded-and-spiked metallic bodysuit, embellished platform boots, welded claws, and a spiked bionic sleeve on her left arm. She sprawls on a large metal grate illuminated by bright pink neon light, trapped beneath a massive metal sine wave. The singer explained that the sine wave is not only the symbol of the planet Chromatica, but the mathematical symbol for sound, which expresses how making music was therapeutic for her. The treatment of the cover, and the artwork's cyberpunk sensibility, prompted journalist comparisons to science fiction media such as Mad Max, Mortal Kombat, and the Alien franchise.

== Music and lyrics ==
=== Overview ===
Chromatica evinced a return to Gaga's characteristic dance-pop style, eschewing the acoustic musical form of Joanne and A Star Is Born. The album's production is distinguished by dense synthesizers, pulsating percussion, ringing grooves, and orchestral arrangements which coalesce overarching melodic themes. Since Gaga sought to recreate authentic 1990s house, the album forgoes contemporary R&B and trap crossover trends popular in mainstream music of the period. Gaga and the producers' devotion to said vision led their total immersion in the music culture, influencing both their choice of technology and studio technique to ensure fidelity. In doing so, AllMusic's Stephen Thomas Erlewine argues, the artist exploits her veteran popstar sensibility, making little attempt to engineer a modern sound. Critics note stylistic debts to a spectrum of genres as techno, trance, and new wave.

Chromatica is a concept album that examines the pursuit of healing and unwavering happiness. The artist explained her attitude to Paper magazine: "I will do whatever it takes to make the world dance and smile [...] I want to put out a record that forces people to rejoice even in their saddest moments [...] If you're in pain and listening to this music, just know that I know what it's like to be in pain. And I know what it's like to also not let it ruin your life." Yet the songwriting's often dark introspection of the subject matter juxtaposes the album's upbeat, diverse musical style, manifesting Gaga's personal views of themes inspired by failed romance and mental health struggles in her private life. The unusual circumstance of an unforeseen pandemic, and the resulting impact on the album's promotional rollout, was said to lend unique context to the lyrics. Justin Moran from Paper viewed Chromatica as an "antidepressant for Gaga" whose songs seem to mitigate her intense plight. Although the singer declared Joanne her most personal record, some reviewers, such as Pitchfork's Katherine St. Asaph argued Chromatica's treatment of the subject matter provides a more intimate listening experience. Kory Grow from Rolling Stone referred to the music of the album as "therapy pop".

=== Songs ===
Chromatica is divided into three distinct acts, the first of which signifies the beginning of Gaga's quest for healing. The opening orchestral interlude, "Chromatica I", exhibits the tone of impending doom into the electronica-inspired "Alice", alluding to Lewis Carroll's similarly titled 1865 fantasy novel to portray the subject of one's yearning to belong. "Alice" demonstrates Gaga's upper register against kick drums and shimmering synths. The lyrics of "Stupid Love", set to the backdrop of a disco-flavored beat, and "Rain on Me" explore themes of resilience after heartbreak. Gaga describes "Rain on Me" as symbolism for her dependence on alcohol. The song's French house-inspired backdrop of synthesizers and pulsating percussion underpin Gaga and Grande's vocal interplay. Gaga's experience with sexual assault from a producer yielded "Free Woman", a keyboard-laden song finding Gaga reclaiming her freedom. "Fun Tonight", a Eurodance-fused track concerning self-reflection, was sung in an impassioned style to exude intense anxiety.

"911"
"911" features vocoded vocals over a robo-funk groove, a style associated with the sound of French electronic music duo Daft Punk.

On the second interlude, "Chromatica II", crescendoing strings segue into Chromatica's eighth song "911". "911" is built on vocoded vocals and a "sleek robo-funk groove", a style Hannah Mylrea of NME associated with the work of Daft Punk. The song's subject matter explores themes of self-loathing and Gaga's addiction to antipsychotic medication; the song's processed vocals aimed to evoke the mental anguish of depression. On "Plastic Doll", with its "punchy and scintillating" sound of synthetic drum snaps and swooping falsetto, Gaga uses a Barbie metaphor to convey the objectification of women.

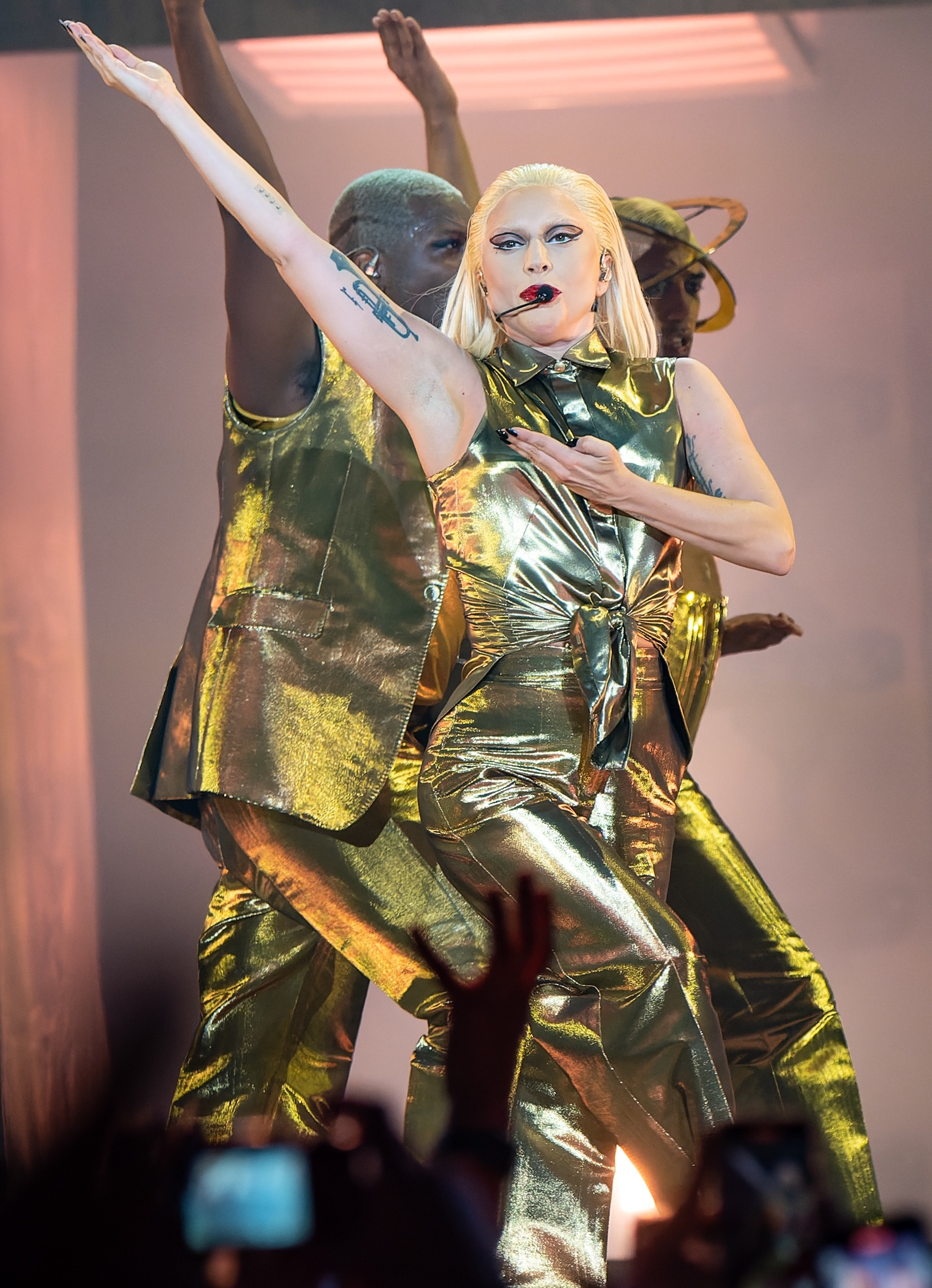
Gaga voguing to "Babylon" on The Chromatica Ball. Journalists accredited notable influence on the song to "Vogue" (1990) by Madonna. (Note: Attributed to multiple references:)

A sample of Maya Jane Coles' "What They Say" (2010) sources the deep house-inflection of the bilingual "Sour Candy", Chromatica's tenth track, where Blackpink and a deadpanned Gaga advise prospective lovers to embrace their imperfection through candy metaphors. Elements of David Bowie's 1977 single "Heroes" were found in the chorus of "Enigma". Reminiscent of Gaga's more contemporary work on Artpop, "Enigma" speaks of one's desire for companionship, underpinned by a "funky" backdrop of "woozy" horn loops, swirling strings, and vocal flexing. "Replay", featuring a sample of "It's My House" (1979) by Diana Ross, is a French house-flavored track replete with ghost-like vocals, whose lyrics see Gaga confronting her diminished self-esteem.

"Chromatica III", the album's "dramatic" final interlude, then transitions into "Sine from Above", a synthpop song exploring spirituality and the therapeutic power of music. With strong electronica and trance influences, "Sine from Above" contains panpipe-inflected beats and a drum n' bass breakdown for outro. The penultimate track of the standard edition is "1000 Doves", described as a "graceful cry for help", where Gaga sings about the perils of loneliness. The lyrics are accompanied by a piano-led backbeat, "sparkling" synths, and "ethereal" backing vocals. Chromatica's closing track, the hi-NRG-inspired "Babylon", was noted for its playful non sequiturs, key change, and diverse vocal approaches, mirroring the hallmarks of Grace Jones, The B-52's, and Madonna's "Vogue" (1990). Expressing Gaga's dismissal of the tabloids, the retro sound of "Babylon" is marked by a melding of thick piano lines, flamboyant saxophones and half-spoken choruses. "Love Me Right", the only original bonus track on the Target and international deluxe editions, features a slower tempo than the rest of the album, with carefree production contrasting its confessional lyrics.

== Release ==
Gaga commenced Chromatica's rollout with a sarcastic tweet addressing tabloid speculation of pregnancy, saying: "Rumors I'm pregnant? Yeah, I'm pregnant with #LG6." The singer continued using social media to engage her fan base. Gaga revealed the album's name and an April 10 release date to the media on March 2, 2020, and Interscope Records launched pre-ordering services simultaneously with the announcement. She and Interscope soon postponed the album's early April 2020 release date, at first indefinitely, impelled by the burgeoning COVID-19 pandemic. She elaborated on her decision: "It's been a very difficult time for a lot of people, and we stopped the drop of the record and everything that we were doing because I really wanted to be more specific at one point. I wanted to do something to help the world, that was very focused. And working with the World Health Organization and Global Citizen [on the televised benefit concert, Together at Home] was a way for me to talk about kindness, and the things that I believe in, in a very focused way, as opposed to a more abstract way, which for me, is what Chromatica is."

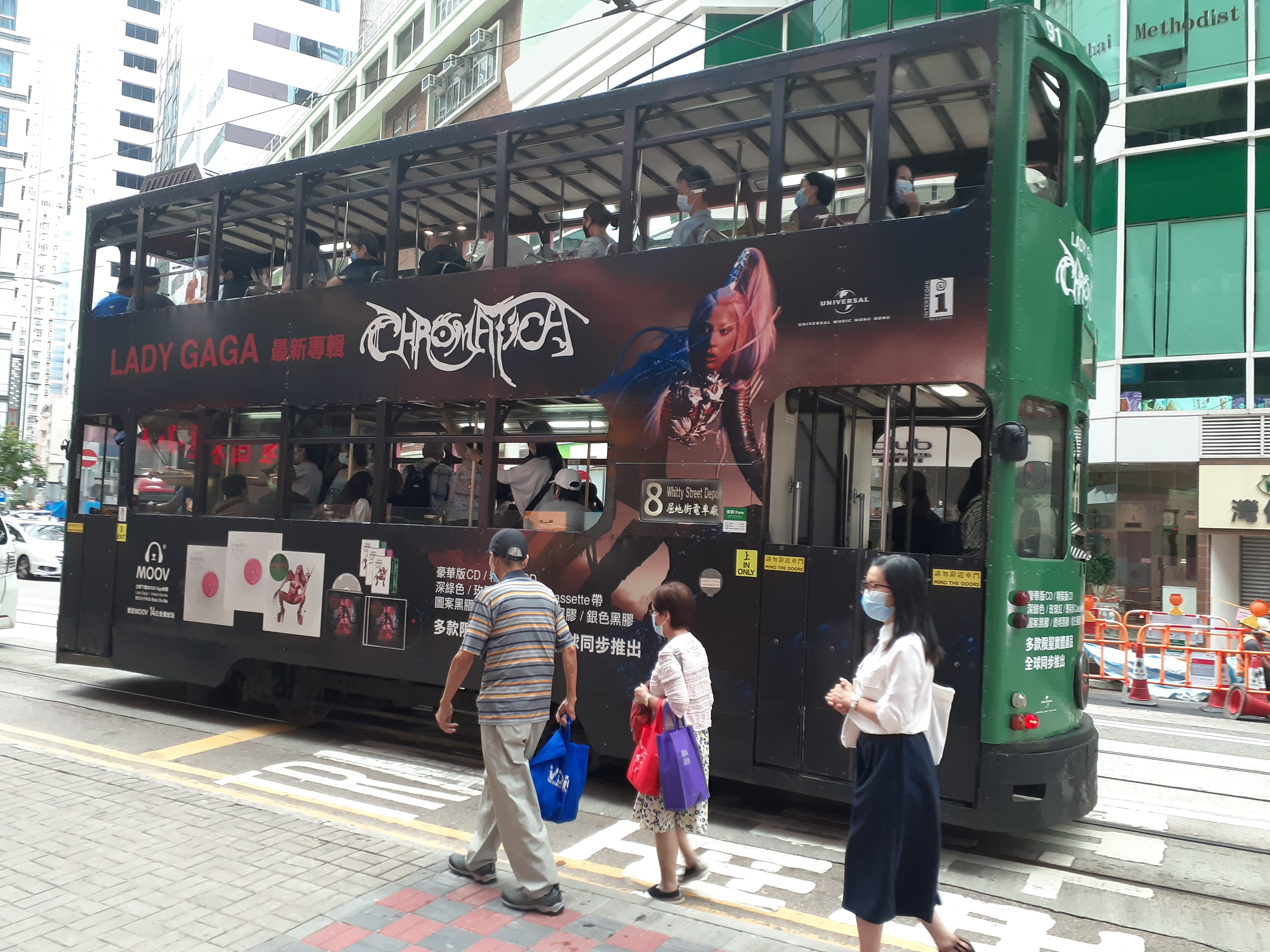
Hong Kong tram advertising showcasing the album's various physical copy iterations

Chromatica was released through physical and digital media on May 29, 2020, by Interscope and subsidiary Streamline, Gaga's sixth project under Interscope–Streamline management. The standard edition's vinyl records include picture discs and colored iterations in a milky white palette, a web-exclusive clear color, and a limited edition silver color sold exclusively at Urban Outfitters. Standard cassettes were released in a palette of pink, dark and mint greens; neon green cassette tapes were sold exclusively in the United Kingdom, while Urban Outfitters distributed clear copies. The Target and international deluxe editions of Chromatica contain three bonus tracks: "Love Me Right", "1000 Doves (Piano Demo)" and "Stupid Love (Vitaclub Warehouse Mix)". The Japanese edition includes an additional track, the Ellis remix of "Stupid Love". To commemorate the global release of Chromatica, Spotify unveiled their enhanced visual album "Welcome to Chromatica", complete with interspersing footage of Gaga's "Chromatica Manifesto", exclusive photos, downloadable posters, and a microsite focusing on positivity and inclusion. French company IICONI issued a vinyl-sized frame of the album cover art with digital access to the deluxe edition of Chromatica via their mobile app, which also involves a selection of video and photo content.

Interscope released a limited box set edition of Chromatica on November 22, 2020, comprising the album's deluxe set, three remixes, a poster of the album cover, postcards, and temporary tattoos. The Japanese version of the box set additionally contains a DVD with an interview, music videos, and behind-the-scenes footage. A limited edition trifold vinyl was released on June 25, 2021, containing a 40-page fanzine and a 28-page LP-sized album booklet. The vinyl was also released in yellow color as a Record Store Day exclusive on June 12, 2021. To commemorate Gaga's first tour dates in Japan in eight years with The Chromatica Ball, a Japanese tour edition of Chromatica was released on August 31, 2022. It features the song "Hold My Hand" from the soundtrack of Top Gun: Maverick as a bonus track on the CD, along with the same DVD as in the earlier Japanese box set, and with a booklet and tour poster also included in the package.

== Promotion ==
Bobby Campbell, Gaga's manager, stated that he spent about 18 months putting together a promotional campaign that Interscope Records chairman/CEO John Janick called "one of the best rollouts planned for an album ever". However, due to the COVID-19 pandemic, most of these plans had to be delayed or completely scrapped. This included brand campaigns, music videos, and live performances, such as cancelled gigs at the 2020 iHeartRadio Music Awards and at the 2020 Coachella Valley Music and Arts Festival.

In May 2020, Gaga released an eyeshadow palette named after "Stupid Love" through her beauty line, Haus Laboratories, along with a lip sync video featuring the singer and influencers from the world of makeup. The same month, in partnership with The Weather Channel, Gaga and Ariana Grande appeared in mock weather update videos to advertise "Rain on Me". During June, Gaga showed up in a Zoom party called Paper x Club Quarantine Presents: Lady Gaga's Chromatica Fundrager, to benefit the Marsha P. Johnson Institute. The singer then organized two Adobe-sponsored online challenges with $10,000 winning cash grand prizes, where participants had to design Chromatica-themed artwork with Adobe creative apps. She hosted a weekly radio show on Apple Music 1 titled Gaga Radio in August 2020, in which she discusses her creative process and showcases exclusive DJ mixes per episode. Gaga interviewed artists involved in the production of the album and, on the final episode, briefly interacted with some of her fans on FaceTime.

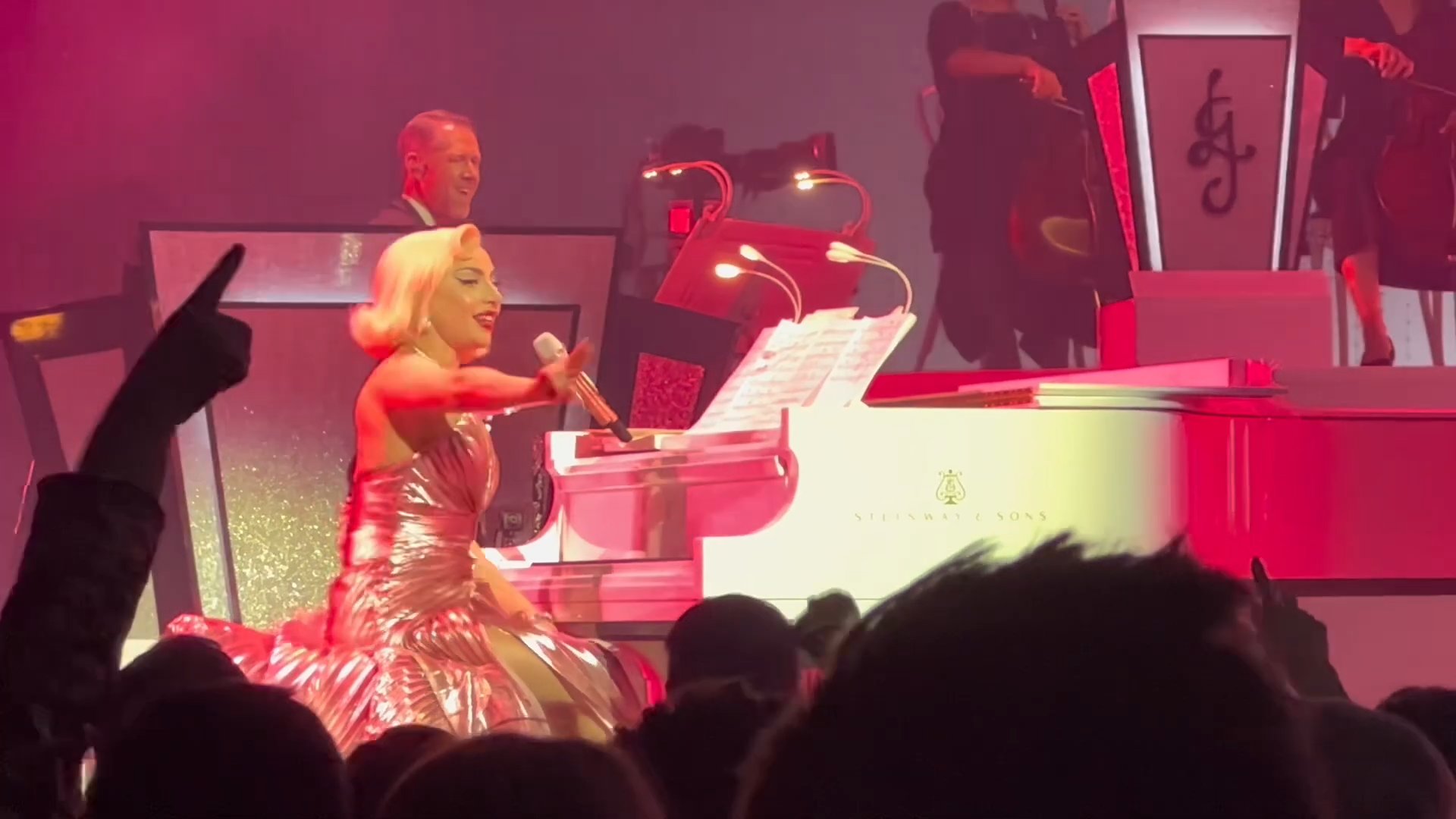
Gaga performing a soul-pop version of lead single "Stupid Love" at her Jazz & Piano residency in Las Vegas

On August 30, 2020, Gaga performed a four-song medley ("Chromatica II", "911", "Rain on Me", and "Stupid Love") at the 2020 MTV Video Music Awards, her first VMA appearance in seven years. Grande accompanied the singer for "Rain on Me", both sporting face masks for the entire duration. Lindsay Zoladz of The New York Times called it "an energetic, bonkers and wholly cathartic nine minutes". In September 2020, Gaga spearheaded a video campaign for Valentino's Voce Viva fragrance line, singing a stripped-down version of "Sine from Above" with a group of models. The following December, Oreo launched a collaborative line of pink-colored Golden Oreo cookies featuring Chromatica-inspired cookie embossments.

In April 2021, Gaga teamed up with Champagne brand Dom Pérignon, and appeared in an ad shot by Nick Knight, which included excerpts from "Free Woman". Next in July, "Free Woman" got featured in Apple's GarageBand app as a Remix Session sound pack, along with an "inspirational video" by Gaga. In December 2021, a 10-track Lady Gaga Music Pack became available in virtual reality rhythm game Beat Saber, which includes "Stupid Love" and "Rain on Me", and features a futuristic cyberpunk environment inspired by Chromatica. In 2023, Gaga updated the setlist of her Jazz & Piano residency in Las Vegas with a soul-pop version of "Stupid Love", performed on the piano.

=== Singles ===
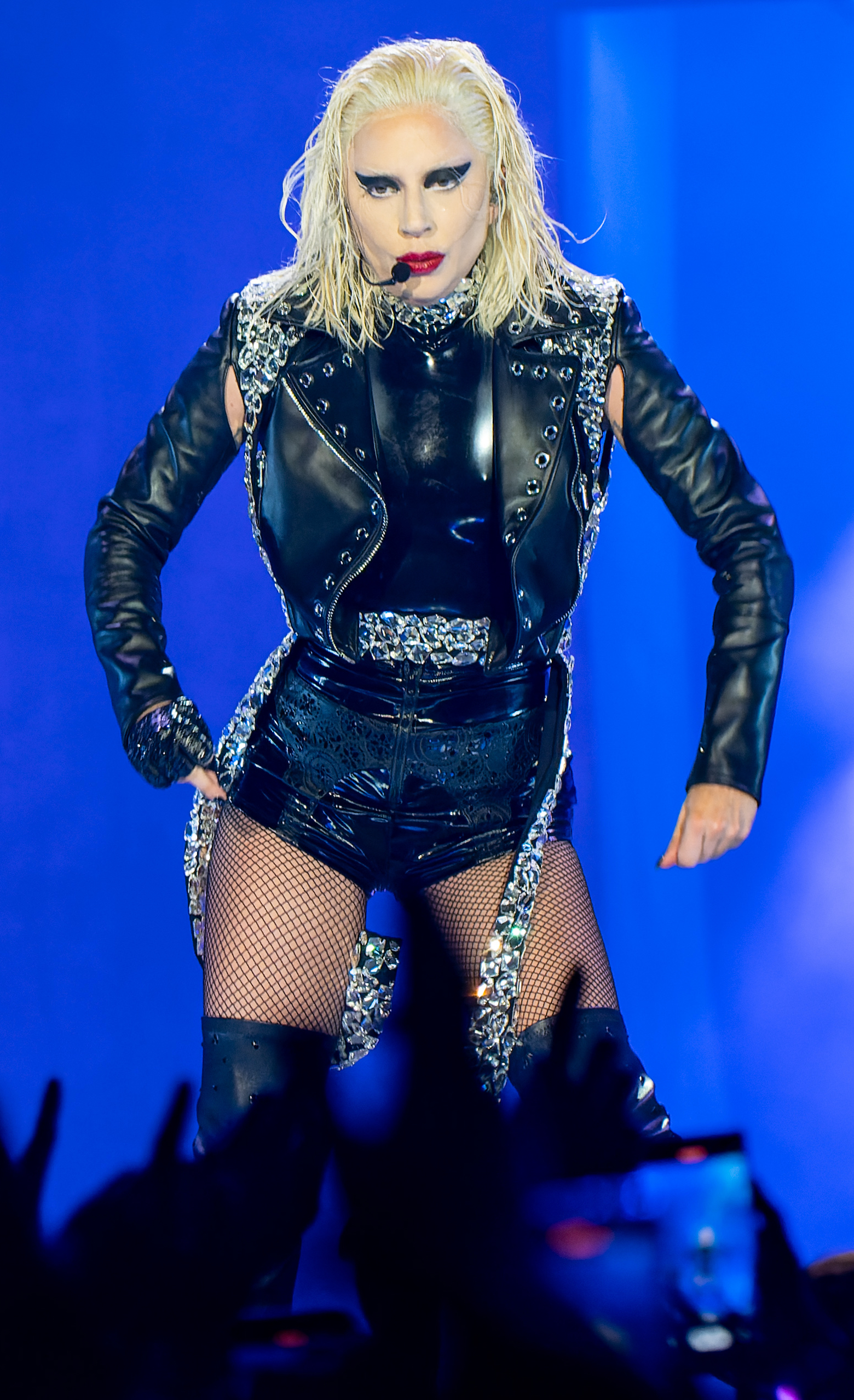
Gaga performing "Rain on Me" during The Chromatica Ball. The 2022 concert series was her first all-stadium tour.

Gaga chose "Stupid Love" as the album's lead single, released on February 28, 2020. The song, compared favorably to her early work, achieved commercial success in the US and the UK by peaking at number five on the charts. Interscope released the accompanying music video, directed by Daniel Askill, on the same day. It takes place on the dystopian planet Chromatica, with Gaga leading the "Kindness Punks" and performing choreography with groups of dance warriors, each group with a corresponding color. "Rain on Me" was released as the second single on May 22, 2020, to critical acclaim. Robert Rodriguez directed its music video, which premiered the afternoon of the single release, and showcases a cyberpunk rave in the rain. "Rain on Me" debuted as Gaga's fifth number one Billboard Hot 100 entry and her sixth number one entry on the UK charts.

A day ahead of Chromatica's scheduled release, and with no announcement, Gaga released "Sour Candy" as a promotional single. "911" was accompanied with a music video on September 18, 2020, directed by Tarsem Singh. It was inspired by Armenian director Sergei Parajanov’s 1969 film The Color of Pomegranates, and features a surreal dreamscape and a twist ending. The song was serviced to Italian contemporary hit radio on September 25, 2020. "Free Woman" was sent to radio in France as the fourth single from the album on April 13, 2021. A remix edit of "Free Woman" by Honey Dijon was formerly released to commemorate the last episode of Gaga Radio on August 28, 2020.

=== Tour ===
During the summer of 2022, Gaga embarked on The Chromatica Ball tour to support the album. The twenty-date long, all-stadium concert series began on July 17, in Düsseldorf, and concluded on September 17, in Miami Gardens. The tour was postponed twice from its original 2020 summer date due to safety concerns over the COVID-19 pandemic. In line with Chromatica's themes, the show's narrative depicts a journey around trauma and healing. The Chromatica Ball was praised by critics for its visuals, the choreography, Gaga's vocal skills, and the a cappella performances were especially highlighted by many of them. (Note: Attributed to multiple references:) It was also a commercial success, earning $112.4 million from 834,000 tickets sold, while breaking multiple personal attendance records and venue records.

The show on September 10, 2022, in Los Angeles, was recorded for a concert film, Gaga Chromatica Ball, released on May 25, 2024, on HBO and Max.

== Critical reception ==
Professional ratings
Aggregate scores
| Source | Rating |
|---|---|
| AnyDecentMusic? | 7.6/10 |
| Metacritic | 79/100 |
Review scores
| Source | Rating |
| AllMusic | 4/5 stars |
| The A.V. Club | B |
| DIY | 4.5/5 stars |
| Entertainment Weekly | A− |
| The Guardian | 4/5 stars |
| The Independent | 4/5 stars |
| NME | 4/5 stars |
| Pitchfork | 7.3/10 |
| Rolling Stone | 4/5 stars |
| Slant Magazine | 2.5/5 stars |

Chromatica received positive reviews from critics. At Metacritic, which assigns a normalized rating out of 100 to reviews from mainstream critics, Chromatica has an average score of 79 based on 25 reviews. Aggregator AnyDecentMusic? gave the album 7.6 out of 10, based on their assessment of the critical consensus.

Reviews compared the album favorably to Gaga's catalog as a more concise body of work. The album's craftsmanship was the main source of praise from journalists, who routinely singled out Gaga and the producers for further compliments: Variety's Jem Aswad felt Bloodpop's individual creative vision lent cohesion to Chromatica even in the music's more chaotic moments, whereas Erlewine saw the album as an exercise of Gaga's honed expertise. Others, such as PopMatters writer Evan Sawdey, contend the record exemplified "everything great" about Gaga's dance-pop roots. Gaga's vocal performance was cited among the strengths of the album, praised for having commitment to test different styles and lending emotional weight to the music. One particular aspect of Chromatica that impressed reviewers was the handling of the themes, described as "deeply personal", "refreshingly direct", and work indicative of the idea that "integrity and high octane pop songs can [...] still inhabit the same space". On the other hand, the album drew occasional criticism when songs either seemed to fail to fully flesh out Gaga's ambitions or too often examined themes common in her songwriting.

A principal topic of discussion among critics was Chromatica's dense house production. The music, dubbed "glossy" by NME's Hannah Mylrea, was noted for its excess and sophistication. Los Angeles Times's Mikael Wood thought the sound's retro quality enhanced the mood of certain songs, and Entertainment Weekly stated Chromatica transcends the period with "an audacious, glitter-dusted promise of escape from the sad, the bad, and the ordinary". At times the production of Chromatica became a point of contention in the reviews: it drew criticism for being too polished, derivative and sometimes muddled, the product of a musician seeming uncertain of their artistry. The sequencing of the tracks, Pitchfork argued, somewhat undermined the overall tone of the album. Mistakes in the songs were attributed to the album's large staff of producers. The least enthusiastic reviews critiqued Gaga for eluding musical risk-taking on Chromatica by mining inspiration from familiar territory.

=== Accolades and impact ===
Chromatica received a Best Pop Vocal Album nomination at the 63rd Annual Grammy Awards ceremony, and Gaga scored her second Best Pop Duo/Group Performance win with "Rain on Me", making history by being the first female collaboration to win. It also won the award for Western Album of the Year and Best 3 Western Albums at the 2021 Japan Gold Disc Awards and Top Dance/Electronic Album at the 2021 Billboard Music Awards. The album earned Gaga one People's Choice Award nomination, a nod for Los 40 Music Award's Best International Album, and a GLAAD Media Award nomination for the category of Outstanding Music Artist.

Upon the release of Drake's Honestly, Nevermind and Beyoncé's Renaissance, both in 2022, some publications noted the impact of Chromatica and Dua Lipa's Future Nostalgia (2020) in bringing house music back into the mainstream pop music scene.

Select rankings of Chromatica
| Publication | List | Rank | Ref. |
|---|---|---|---|
| Billboard | The 50 Best Albums of 2020 | 5 | |
| Consequence of Sound | Top 50 Albums of 2020 | 8 | |
| Dazed | The 20 Best Albums of 2020 | 4 | |
| NJ.com | The 50 Best Albums of 2020 | 8 | |
| NME | The 50 Best Albums of 2020 | 14 | |
| People | The Best Albums of 2020 | 3 | |
| PopMatters | The 15 Best Pop Albums of 2020 | 3 | |
| Rolling Stone | The 50 Best Albums of 2020 | 11 | |
| Slate | Brittany Spanos' Top Albums of 2020 | 6 | |
| Yahoo Entertainment | Jen Kucsak's Best Albums of 2020 | 2 | |

== Commercial performance ==
Chromatica debuted at number one on the US Billboard 200 chart with first week sales of 274,000 album-equivalent units (including 205,000 pure sales), at that time the biggest opening week of 2020 for a female artist and fifth best sales week overall. Album sales comprised 75% of the total sum, boosted by a robust performance at US retailers. The remaining 65,000 units were album-equivalent units, denoting 87.16 million on-demand streams of individual tracks. This gave Gaga her sixth consecutive Billboard 200-topping album, the eighth woman to claim six chart-topping albums, and, at nine years and two days, the record for the fastest six number-one-album tally by a female artist. The second week saw Chromatica's sales performance drop by 77%, dipping to number two with 64,000 album-equivalent units moved, but the album sustained the momentum into the third week by staying at number two with 44,000 units.

The album's reported US sales exceeded 400,000 units after a month. Following a vinyl release on June 25, 2021, Chromatica re-entered the Billboard 200 at number 59 and topped the Vinyl Albums chart, selling 8,000 vinyl copies. The album has sold 76,000 copies across all of its vinyl editions, as of July 2021. In total, it has moved 1,132,000 units in the US as of January 2022, and was later certified Platinum by the Recording Industry Association of America (RIAA). It charted for a total of 41 weeks on the Billboard 200.

After three days of release, Chromatica sold around 40,000 copies in the United Kingdom. According to the Official Charts Company data, this was more than the midweek sales of the combined top twenty. After a week of sales, Chromatica topped the UK Albums Chart by selling 52,907 units, the fastest-selling record of 2020 until Kylie Minogue's Disco. It was Gaga's fourth number one entry on the UK charts, eclipsing the debuts of her most contemporary work. Physical sales constituted the largest share of the sum, with another 8,500 units comprising vinyl sales, the year's fastest selling vinyl record there at that time. In its second week, Chromatica remained at number one on the UK Album Charts with 12,819 units. Chromatica finished the year as the country's best-selling cassette record, the 22nd best-selling album (all formats), and among the five biggest releases from a female artist. As of March 2021, it is the 19th fastest selling vinyl since 2000, placing fourth among women.

The album reached number one on the charts of various overseas markets, including Austria, Finland, Italy, the Netherlands, New Zealand, Portugal and Switzerland. Chromatica yielded multi-week number one runs in Australia and Canada and, in France, ascended to the summit of the charts by selling 21,746 units, her best score since "Born This Way", released 9 years earlier and topped the French albums chart. In Japan, the album opened at number three on the charts, selling 14,238 copies for the week ending June 8, 2020.

== Remix album ==
A follow-up remix album, titled Dawn of Chromatica, was released on September 3, 2021. It contains reimagined versions of the Chromatica tracks with predominantly underground and hyperpop production. Featured artists on the record include Arca, Rina Sawayama, Pabllo Vittar, Charli XCX, Ashnikko, Shygirl, Dorian Electra, and Bree Runway. The remix album received generally favorable reviews.

== Track listing ==
Standard edition
| No. | Title | Writer(s) | Producer(s) | Length |
|---|---|---|---|---|
| 1. | "Chromatica I" | Lady Gaga; Morgan Kibby | Kibby; Gaga | 1:00 |
| 2. | "Alice" | Gaga; BloodPop; Axel Hedfors; Justin Tranter; Johannes Klahr | BloodPop; Axwell; Klahr; Benjamin Rice^{[a]} | 2:57 |
| 3. | "Stupid Love" | Gaga; BloodPop; Max Martin; Martin Joseph Léonard Bresso; Ely Rise | BloodPop; Tchami; Martin^{[b]}; Rice^{[a]} | 3:13 |
| 4. | "Rain on Me" (with Ariana Grande) | Gaga; BloodPop; Matthew Burns; Nija Charles; Rami Yacoub; Bresso; Grande; Alexander Ridha | BloodPop; Burns; Tchami^{[c]}; Rice^{[a]} | 3:02 |
| 5. | "Free Woman" | Gaga; BloodPop; Hedfors; Klahr | BloodPop; Axwell; Klahr; Rice^{[a]} | 3:11 |
| 6. | "Fun Tonight" | Gaga; BloodPop; Burns; Yacoub | BloodPop; Burns; Rice^{[a]} | 2:53 |
| 7. | "Chromatica II" | Gaga; Kibby | Kibby; Gaga | 0:41 |
| 8. | "911" | Gaga; BloodPop; Madeon; Tranter | BloodPop; Madeon; Rice^{[a]} | 2:52 |
| 9. | "Plastic Doll" | Gaga; BloodPop; Skrillex; Yacoub; Jacob "JKash" Hindlin | BloodPop; Skrillex; Rice^{[a]} | 3:41 |
| 10. | "Sour Candy" (with Blackpink) | Gaga; BloodPop; Burns; Yacoub; Madison Emiko Love; Park Hong-jun | BloodPop; Burns; Rice^{[a]} | 2:37 |
| 11. | "Enigma" | Gaga; BloodPop; Burns; Hindlin | BloodPop; Burns; Rice^{[a]} | 2:59 |
| 12. | "Replay" | Gaga; BloodPop; Burns | Burns; Rice^{[a]} | 3:06 |
| 13. | "Chromatica III" | Gaga; Kibby | Kibby; Gaga | 0:27 |
| 14. | "Sine from Above" (with Elton John) | Gaga; BloodPop; John; Hedfors; Klahr; Yacoub; Richard Zastenker; Ryan Tedder; Sebastian Ingrosso; Rice; Vincent Ponte; Salem Al Fakir | BloodPop; Burns; Axwell; Klahr; Liohn; Yacoub^{[c]}; Rice^{[a]} | 4:04 |
| 15. | "1000 Doves" | Gaga; BloodPop; Bresso; Yacoub | BloodPop; Tchami; Rice^{[a]} | 3:35 |
| 16. | "Babylon" | Gaga; BloodPop; Burns | BloodPop; Burns; Tchami^{[c]}; Rice^{[a]} | 2:41 |
| Total length: | | | | 43:08 |

Target and international CD deluxe edition
| No. | Title | Writer(s) | Producer(s) | Length |
|---|---|---|---|---|
| 17. | "Love Me Right" | Gaga; BloodPop; Burns | BloodPop; Burns | 2:51 |
| 18. | "1000 Doves" (piano demo) | ^{[d]} | ^{[d]} | 2:49 |
| 19. | "Stupid Love" (Vitaclub Warehouse mix) | Gaga; BloodPop; Martin; Bresso; Rise | BloodPop; Tchami; Martin^{[b]}; Rice^{[a]} | 3:41 |
| Total length: | | | | 52:20 |

Box set edition
| No. | Title | Writer(s) | Producer(s) | Length |
|---|---|---|---|---|
| 20. | "Rain on Me" (Purple Disco Machine remix; with Ariana Grande) | Gaga; BloodPop; Burns; Charles; Yacoub; Bresso; Grande; Ridha; Betty Wright; Jeremiah Burden; Lynn Williams | BloodPop; Tchami; Burns | 6:34 |
| 21. | "Free Woman" (Honey Dijon realness remix) | Gaga; BloodPop; Hedfors; Klahr; Ridha | BloodPop; Axwell; Klahr | 6:46 |
| 22. | "Rain on Me" (Ralphi Rosario remix; with Ariana Grande) | Gaga; BloodPop; Burns; Charles; Yacoub; Bresso; Grande; Ridha; Wright; Burden; Williams | BloodPop; Tchami; Burns | 7:31 |
| Total length: | | | | 76:51 |

=== Notes ===
- ^{^[a]} signifies a vocal producer
- ^{^[b]} signifies a co-producer and vocal producer
- ^{^[c]} signifies an additional producer
- ^{^[d]} There are no published credits for the piano demo of "1000 Doves" according to the album booklet.
- All Japanese editions include the Ellis remix of "Stupid Love".
- Japanese tour edition includes "Love Me Right" and "Hold My Hand" and the Japanese tour/box set edition include a DVD with an interview, the music videos and making of the music videos of "Stupid Love" and "Rain on Me", the lyric video of "Sour Candy" and the short film "911".

== Personnel ==
Credits adapted from the liner notes of Chromatica.

=== Recording locations ===
- Electric Lady (New York City)
- Utility Muffin Research Kitchen (Hollywood Hills)
- Henson Recording Studios (Los Angeles)
- EastWest Studios (Hollywood)
- Good Father Studios (Los Angeles)
- MXM Studios (Los Angeles)
- Conway Recording Studios (Hollywood)
- Sterling Sound (New York City)

=== Vocals ===
- Lady Gaga – vocals (all tracks, except 1, 7, 13)
- Ariana Grande – vocals (4)
- Blackpink – vocals (10)
- Elton John – vocals (14)
- Madison Love – backing vocals (10)
- Rami Yacoub – backing vocals (15)
- Adryon De Leon – choir backing vocals (16)
- Daniel Ozan – choir backing vocals (16)
- India Carney – choir backing vocals (16)
- Jantre Christian – choir backing vocals (16)
- Jyvonne Haskin – choir backing vocals (16)
- Laurhan Beato – choir backing vocals (16)
- Matthew Bloyd – choir backing vocals (16)
- Ronald O'Hannon – choir backing vocals (16)
- Shameka Dwight – choir backing vocals (16)
- Tia Britt – choir backing vocals (16)
- Vanessa Bryan – choir backing vocals (16)
- William Washington – choir backing vocals (16)

=== Instrumentation ===
- Ian Walker – bass (1, 7, 13)
- Giovanna M Clayton – cello (1, 7, 13)
- Timothy E Loo – cello (1, 7, 13)
- Vanessa Freebairn-Smith – cello (1, 7, 13)
- Allen Fogle – French horn (1, 7, 13)
- Dylan Hart – French horn (1, 7, 13)
- Katelyn Faraudo – French horn (1, 7, 13)
- Laura K Brenes – French horn (1, 7, 13)
- Mark Adams – French horn (1, 7, 13)
- Teag Reaves – French horn (1, 7, 13)
- Nicholas Daley – trombone (1, 7, 13)
- Reginald Young – trombone (1, 7, 13)
- Steven M. Holtman – trombone (1, 7, 13)
- Andrew Duckles – viola (1, 7, 13)
- Erik Rynearson – viola (1, 7, 13)
- Linnea Powell – viola (1, 7, 13)
- Meredith Crawford – viola (1, 7, 13)
- Alyssa Park – violin (1, 7, 13)
- Charlie Bisharat – violin (1, 7, 13)
- Jessica Guideri – violin (1, 7, 13)
- Luanne Homzy – violin (1, 7, 13)
- Lucia Micarelli – violin (1, 7, 13)
- Marisa Kuney – violin (1, 7, 13)
- Neel Hammond – violin (1, 7, 13)
- Shalini Vijayan – violin (1, 7, 13)
- Songa Lee – violin (1, 7, 13)
- Axwell – bass, drums, keyboards (2, 5, 14), guitar, percussion (5, 14)
- BloodPop – bass, drums, keyboards (2–3, 5–6, 8–10, 14–16), guitar (3, 5–6, 8–9, 14–15), percussion (3, 5–6, 8–10, 14–16)
- Klahr – bass, drums, keyboards (2, 5, 14), guitar, percussion (5, 14)
- Tchami – bass, drums, guitar, keyboards, percussion (3, 15)
- John "JR" Robinson – drums (3)
- Burns – bass, drums (4, 6, 10–12, 16), guitar (4, 6, 11–12, 14), keyboards (4, 6, 10–12, 14, 16), percussion (6, 10, 12, 14, 16)
- Leddie Garcia – percussion (4, 11)
- Rachel Mazer – saxophone (4, 11, 16)
- Madeon – bass, drums, keyboards (8), guitar, percussion (8–9)
- Skrillex – bass, drums, keyboards (9)
- Liohn – bass, drums, guitar, keyboards, percussion (14)

=== Production ===
- Lady Gaga – executive production, production (1, 7, 13)
- Bloodpop – executive production, production (2–6, 8–11, 14–16)
- Axwell – production (2, 5, 14)
- Burns – production (4, 6, 10–12, 14, 16)
- Morgan Kibby – production (1, 7, 13)
- Klahr – production (2, 5, 14)
- Liohn – production (14)
- Madeon – production (8)
- Skrillex – production (9)
- Tchami – production (3, 15), additional production (4, 16)
- Rami Yacoub – additional production (14)
- Max Martin – co-production, vocal production (3)
- Benjamin Rice – vocal production (2–6, 8–12, 14–16)

=== Technical ===
- Amie Doherty – conductor, orchestra leader (1, 7, 13)
- Gina Zimmitti – orchestra contractor (1, 7, 13)
- Whitney Martin – orchestra contractor (1, 7, 13)
- Axwell – programming (2)
- BloodPop – programming (2, 15)
- Klahr – programming (2)
- Tchami – programming (15), mixing (3)
- Mike Schuppan – mixing (1, 7, 13)
- Tom Norris – mixing (2–6, 8–12, 14–16)
- Benjamin Rice – mixing (2–6, 8–12, 14–16), recording engineer (3–4, 10), engineering (16)
- Scott Kelly – mix assistant (2, 4–6, 9–12, 14–16)
- Randy Merrill – mastering

=== Design ===
- Norbert Schoerner – photography
- Brandon Bowen – photography
- Nicola Formichetti – fashion direction
- Bryan Rivera – creative direction, design
- Isha Dipika Walia – creative direction, design
- Travis Brothers – creative direction, design
- Cecilio Castrillo – outfit design
- Gasoline Glamour – shoe design
- Gary Fay – finger design
- Marta Del Rio – styling
- Frederic Aspiras – hair
- Sarah Tanno – makeup
- Miho Okawara – nails
- Aditya Pamidi – art manager

== Charts ==
=== Weekly charts ===
Weekly chart performance for Chromatica
| Chart (2020–2021) | Peak position |
|---|---|
| Argentine Albums (CAPIF) | 2 |
| Australian Albums (ARIA) | 1 |
| Austrian Albums (Ö3 Austria) | 1 |
| Belgian Albums (Ultratop Flanders) | 3 |
| Belgian Albums (Ultratop Wallonia) | 2 |
| Canadian Albums (Billboard) | 1 |
| Croatian International Albums (HDU) | 1 |
| Czech Albums (ČNS IFPI) | 1 |
| Danish Albums (Hitlisten) | 4 |
| Dutch Albums (Album Top 100) | 1 |
| Estonian Albums (Eesti Tipp-40) | 1 |
| Finnish Albums (Suomen virallinen lista) | 1 |
| French Albums (SNEP) | 1 |
| German Albums (Offizielle Top 100) | 3 |
| Greek Albums (IFPI) | 2 |
| Hungarian Albums (MAHASZ) | 4 |
| Icelandic Albums (Tónlistinn) | 17 |
| Irish Albums (Official Charts) | 1 |
| Italian Albums (FIMI) | 1 |
| Japan Hot Albums (Billboard Japan) | 3 |
| Japanese Albums (Oricon) | 3 |
| Lithuanian Albums (AGATA) | 1 |
| Mexican Albums (AMPROFON) | 1 |
| New Zealand Albums (RMNZ) | 1 |
| Norwegian Albums (VG-lista) | 3 |
| Polish Albums (ZPAV) | 9 |
| Portuguese Albums (AFP) | 1 |
| Scottish Albums (Official Charts) | 1 |
| Slovak Albums (ČNS IFPI) | 2 |
| South Korean Albums (Circle) | 64 |
| Spanish Albums (PROMUSICAE) | 2 |
| Swedish Albums (Sverigetopplistan) | 2 |
| Swiss Albums (Schweizer Hitparade) | 1 |
| Taiwanese Albums (Five Music) | 1 |
| UK Albums (Official Charts) | 1 |
| US Billboard 200 | 1 |
| US Top Dance Albums (Billboard) | 1 |

=== Year-end charts ===
Year-end chart performance for Chromatica
| Chart (2020) | Position |
|---|---|
| Australian Albums (ARIA) | 22 |
| Austrian Albums (Ö3 Austria) | 67 |
| Belgian Albums (Ultratop Flanders) | 48 |
| Belgian Albums (Ultratop Wallonia) | 41 |
| Canadian Albums (Billboard) | 34 |
| Croatian International Albums (HDU) | 10 |
| Dutch Albums (Album Top 100) | 50 |
| French Albums (SNEP) | 64 |
| German Albums (Offizielle Top 100) | 74 |
| Hungarian Albums (MAHASZ) | 61 |
| Irish Albums (IRMA) | 44 |
| Italian Albums (FIMI) | 37 |
| New Zealand Albums (RMNZ) | 44 |
| Portuguese Albums (AFP) | 35 |
| Spanish Albums (PROMUSICAE) | 32 |
| Swedish Albums (Sverigetopplistan) | 86 |
| Swiss Albums (Schweizer Hitparade) | 30 |
| UK Albums (Official Charts) | 22 |
| US Billboard 200 | 50 |
| US Top Dance/Electronic Albums (Billboard) | 1 |

| Chart (2021) | Position |
|---|---|
| Spanish Albums (PROMUSICAE) | 93 |
| US Top Dance/Electronic Albums (Billboard) | 2 |

| Chart (2022) | Position |
|---|---|
| US Top Dance/Electronic Albums (Billboard) | 6 |

| Chart (2023) | Position |
|---|---|
| US Top Dance/Electronic Albums (Billboard) | 19 |

== Certifications ==
Certifications for Chromatica
| Region | Certification | Certified units/sales |
|---|---|---|
| Australia (ARIA) | Gold | 35,000^{‡} |
| Austria (IFPI Austria) | Gold | 7,500^{‡} |
| Canada (Music Canada) | Platinum | 80,000^{‡} |
| Denmark (IFPI Danmark) | Gold | 10,000^{‡} |
| France (SNEP) | Platinum | 100,000^{‡} |
| Italy (FIMI) | Platinum | 50,000^{‡} |
| New Zealand (RMNZ) | Platinum | 15,000^{‡} |
| Norway (IFPI Norway) | Gold | 10,000^{‡} |
| Poland (ZPAV) | Platinum | 20,000^{‡} |
| Singapore (RIAS) | Gold | 5,000^{*} |
| Spain (Promusicae) | Gold | 20,000^{‡} |
| Switzerland (IFPI Switzerland) | Gold | 10,000^{‡} |
| United Kingdom (BPI) | Gold | 100,000^{‡} |
| United States (RIAA) | Platinum | 1,000,000^{‡} |
^{*} Sales figures based on certification alone.^{‡} Sales+streaming figures based on certification alone.

== Release history ==
Release dates and formats for Chromatica
| Region | Date | Format(s) | Edition(s) | Label | Ref. |
|---|---|---|---|---|---|
| Various | May 29, 2020 | Cassette; CD; digital download; streaming; vinyl | Standard | Interscope | |
| Various | May 29, 2020 | CD | Deluxe | Interscope | |
| Japan | May 29, 2020 | CD | Standard; deluxe | Universal Music Japan | |
| Italy | November 20, 2020 | Box set | Deluxe | Universal | |
| United Kingdom | November 20, 2020 | Box set | Deluxe | Polydor | |
| Japan | December 16, 2020 | Box set; DVD | Limited | Universal Music Japan | |
| United States | June 12, 2021 | Trifold vinyl | Limited | Interscope | |
| United Kingdom | June 25, 2021 | Trifold vinyl | Limited | Polydor | |
| Japan | August 31, 2022 | CD+DVD | Japan tour edition | Universal Music Japan | |
| Canada | September 9, 2022 | CD+DVD | Japan tour edition | Universal Music Japan | |
| United States | September 9, 2022 | CD+DVD | Japan tour edition | Universal Music Japan | |
| United Kingdom | September 23, 2022 | CD+DVD | Japan tour edition | Universal Music Japan | |

== See also ==
- List of number-one albums of 2020 (Australia)
- List of Billboard 200 number-one albums of 2020
- List of number-one albums of 2020 (Canada)
- List of number-one albums of 2020 (Finland)
- List of number-one albums of 2020 (Ireland)
- List of number-one albums of 2020 (Mexico)
- List of number-one albums of 2020 (Portugal)
