= Lisa Eldridge =

British make-up artist

Lisa Eldridge MBE
- Born: 26 October 1971 (age 55); New Zealand

Instagram information
- Page: lisaeldridgemakeup
- Followers: 2 million

YouTube information
- Channel: Lisa Eldridge
- Years active: 2008–present
- Genre: Makeup
- Subscribers: 2.12 million
- Views: 270.6 million
- Last updated: 27 October 2026

Lisa Eldridge, MBE (born 26 October 1971) is a New Zealand-born England-based make-up artist, entrepreneur, author, and YouTuber. Her professional career began when she was booked by Elle magazine to work with model Cindy Crawford. From 2003 to 2013, Eldridge was the creative director for Boots No7, where she was responsible for developing, re-designing, and re-launching the brand. From 2015 to 2026, Eldridge was the global creative director of Lancôme. In 2024, it was announced Eldridge would be awarded an MBE for her service to the cosmetic and fashion industries. The Prince of Wales bestowed the award formally during an investiture ceremony held on 21 March 2025.

== Early life ==
Born on 26 October 1971 in New Zealand, Eldridge later moved to the UK and settled with her family in Liverpool. She gained interest in cosmetics at age six, when she discovered a box of her mother's vintage Mary Quant and Coty make-up from the 1960s at her grandmother's house. Her interest deepened when she was given a book on theatrical stage make-up as a teenager, and it was then that she decided to pursue a career in make-up artistry.

== Career ==
After moving to London, Eldridge took a course in photographic make-up artistry at Complexions while working on the Lancôme counter at Harrods to gain first-hand experience. She then began building her portfolio, and eventually she signed up with a make-up agency. In the early stages of her career, Elle magazine hired Eldridge to work with model Cindy Crawford, which led to the pair working together on several more shoots. Eldridge has been based in Paris, New York and, Los Angeles, and resides full-time in London. Her work has appeared on the pages, covers, and celebrity shoots of British, Italian, French, Chinese, and Japanese Vogue, as well as Love, Allure, Glamour, Elle, Numéro, Harper's Bazaar, Pop, i-D and, Lula. Throughout her career Eldridge has worked with a range of world famous photographers, including Tim Walker, Mert and Marcus, Regan Cameron, Sølve Sundsbø, Rankin, Paolo Roversi, David Sims, Mario Testino, and Patrick Demarchelier. She has also collaborated with fashion houses and beauty brands on their international advertising campaigns and runway shows. These include Lancôme, Chloé, Alberta Ferretti, Prada, Donna Karan, Moschino, Yohji Yamamoto, and Pucci.

In 2009, Eldridge launched her website of make-up tutorials, beauty advice, and insider knowledge. The following year, she launched her YouTube channel where she posts beauty tutorials.

In 2013 she was named by The Business of Fashion as one of the people 'Shaping the Global Fashion Industry' in their annual Fashion 500 list. Since 2015, she has been the make-up creative director of Lancôme.

In October 2015, she published the book Face Paint: The Story of Makeup, focused on the extensive history of makeup.

In 2018, Eldridge launched her own make-up line starting with three shades of velvet lipsticks and has since expanded to complexion products, skincare, and make-up tools. She also launched her own jewelry line in collaboration with jeweler William Welstead.

In December 2024, Eldridge was appointed a MBE in the New Year Honours list for services to cosmetics and fashion handed out by King Charles III and members of the royal family.

== Television and media ==
Eldridge has been the resident on-screen beauty expert for the Channel 4 TV series Ten Years Younger, as well as an expert on non-invasive treatments on Ten Years Younger – The Challenge.

She has made numerous UK television appearances on GMTV and Lorraine, and has also appeared on the Today Show in the USA.

In 2021 Eldridge hosted Makeup: A Glamorous History, a show about the history of makeup on BBC Two.

== Brand collaborations ==
From 2003 to 2013, Eldridge was creative director for Boots No7, where she was responsible for developing, re-designing, and re-launching the brand. Since June 2011, she has worked with Chanel to create videos for their site, Chanel.com. Eldridge was the Global Creative Director of Lancôme from 2015 to 2026.
