= Norbert Schoerner =

German photographer (born 1966)

Norbert Schoerner (born 1966) is a German photographer and filmmaker based in London.

== Career ==
Based in London since 1989, he spent the early 1990s experimenting with layered imaging and digital post production, primarily in The Face. His work has since been published in NY Times magazine, Vogue, and Another Magazine. His advertising campaigns have included Comme des Garçons, Shiseido, Prada, Lacoste, and Aries.

Schoerner’s photographic and multi-media works have been featured in numerous group shows such as: photo50 (London Art Fair, 2010), You Dig the Tunnel – I’ll Hide the Soil (White Cube, London, 2008), Cities: People, Architecture and Society (La Biennale, Venice, 2006), I Shot Norman Foster at the Architecture Foundation (London, 2005), and JAM: Tokyo-London (Tokyo Opera City, 2002). The exhibition 'Daydreaming with Stanley Kubrick' Somerset House, London (2016) featured a 360° VR installation inspired by Kubrick's seminal work 2001: A Space Odyssey.

Solo exhibitions have been held at Comme des Garçons (with The Face, Aoyama, Tokyo, 1995), Chapman Fine Arts (London, 2001), SDLX (Tokyo, 2004) and Museum 52 (London, 2004). In 2005, Schoerner had a mini-retrospective at the photography festival in Hyères, France for which he created The Court, an interactive and site-specific interpretation of the very notion of “retrospective”.

Schoerner's book The Order of Things was published by Phaidon in 2002. He has collaborated with Jake and Dinos Chapman, and contributed to books such as The Impossible Image: Fashion Photography in the Digital Age (Phaidon, 2000), Apocalypse (Royal Academy, London, 2000), Hell (Jake and Dinos Chapman, Saatchi Gallery, 2003), and Beauty in Vogue (Condé Nast, 2007). In 2010 he created a photographic essay for the Artangel commissioned Victoria and Albert Museum project The Concise Dictionary of Dress (Violette Editions).

In 2011, Dazed & Confused Magazine's 20th anniversary exhibition highlighted Schoerner's iconic 2001 editorial collaboration with Alexander McQueen in the form of an installation consisting of floor to ceiling vinyl reprints. The series is also featured in the accompanying book Dazed & Confused: Making It Up As We Go Along (Rizzoli, 2011). A new monograph titled Third Life was published by Violette Editions in 2012. Claire de Rouen Books recently published a collaborative book between Schoerner and Steve Nakamura on the subject of food titled Nearly Eternal.

In 2020, Schoerner worked on the album cover art of Chromatica, the sixth studio album by Lady Gaga.

In 2021, Schoerner was featured in Wallpaper magazine for his AI art works that were redefining image-making. The set of AI generated images were then displayed in the historical Fitzrovia Chapel in London, UK. Schoerner's long term photographic project The Nature of Nature: Fukushima Project was exhibited at the Museum Angewandte Kunst in Frankfurt, Germany in the summer of 2022.

Schoerner co-curated the 2025 exhibition The Face Magazine: Cultural Shift at the National Portrait Gallery in London.

== Selected exhibitions ==
Solo Exhibitions

- The Face (Comme des Garçons, Tokyo, 1994)
- The Farm (Tomato, London, 1998)
- Tradition (Speak 4 Gallery, Tokyo, 2000)
- The Order of Things (Chapman Fine Arts, London, 2001)
- Flat (Museum 52, London, 2004)
- Kingdom (Film installation, SuperDeluxe, Tokyo, 2004)
- Court (Retrospective, Villa Noailles, Hyères, 2005)
- Third Life (Tsutaya T-Site, Tokyo, 2012)
- Nearly Eternal (Bookmarc, Tokyo, 2017)
- Zeitraum (Retrospektive, Mühldorf, 2017)
- Gegenlicht (Haus der Fotografie, Burghausen, 2020)
- Decoy (Fitzrovia Chapel, London, 2022)
- The Nature of Nature: Fukushima Project (Museum Angewandte Kunst, Frankfurt, 2022)

Group Exhibitions

- Stealing Beauty (Film, ICA, London, 1999)
- Tokyo-London Jam (Barbican, London, 2001 / Opera City, Tokyo, 2002)
- Archeology of Elegance (Deichtorhallen, Hamburg, 2002)
- Showstudio (Film, Photographer’s Gallery, London, 2003)
- Sense and Sensibility (Transition Gallery, London, 2003)
- Man in the Holocene (Film, Curzon Cinema, London, 2004)
- I Shot Norman Foster (Architectural Foundation, London, 2005)
- Cities, Architecture and Society (La Biennale, Venice, 2006)
- You Dig the Tunnel - I’ll Hide the Soil (Film installation, White Cube, London, 2008)
- Photo 50 (London Art Fair, London, 2010)
- Dazed & Confused: Making It Up As We Go Along (Somerset House, London, 2011)
- Vogue 100: A Century of Style (National Portrait Gallery, 2016)
- Daydreaming with: Stanley Kubrick (360o VR, Somerset House, London, 2016)
- Never Ending Stories (Kunstmuseum Wolfsburg, 2017)
- Präsens (Jil Sander, Museum Angewandte Kunst, Frankfurt, 2017)
- Beyond 2001: Odysseys of Intelligence (Espacio Fundación Telefónica, Madrid, 2018)
- Beyond The Road (Saatchi Gallery, London, 2019)
- The Face Magazine: Culture Shift (National Portrait Gallery, London, 2025)

== Publications ==
Monographs

- Apocalypse (Royal Academy, London, 2000)
- The Order of Things (Phaidon, 2002)
- Concise Dictionary of Dress (Violette Editions / Artangel / V&A Museum, 2010)
- Third Life (Violette Editions, 2012)
- Nearly Eternal (Chance Publishing, 2016)
- Pictures I Never Took (Newspaper Pre-edition, Antenne Books, 2018)
- The Nature of Nature: Fukushima Project (Walther & Franz König, 2022)
- PRADA ARCHIVE 1998-2002 (IDEA Books, 2024)
- AURA: A Collaboration with Human and Other Minds, 2011-2023 (False Glance, 2026)

Book Contributions

- The Impossible Image (Phaidon, 2000)
- Dazed & Confused: Fashion and Art (Booth Clibborn Editions, 2000)
- The Archeology of Elegance (Schirmer Mosel, 2002)
- Hell (Jake+Dinos Chapman, Saatchi Gallery, 2003)
- You Dig the Tunnel, I’ll Hide the Soil (White Cube Gallery, 2008)
- Dazed & Confused: Making It Up As We Go Along (Rizzoli, 2011)
- Vogue 100: A Century of Style (National Portrait Gallery, 2016)
- The Story of The Face (Thames & Hudson, 2017)
- Jil Sander: Present Tense (Prestel, Museum Angewandte Kunst, 2017)
- The Face Magazine: Culture Shift (National Portrait Gallery Publishing, 2025)
