= List of Conan Gray live performances =

Conan Gray live performances
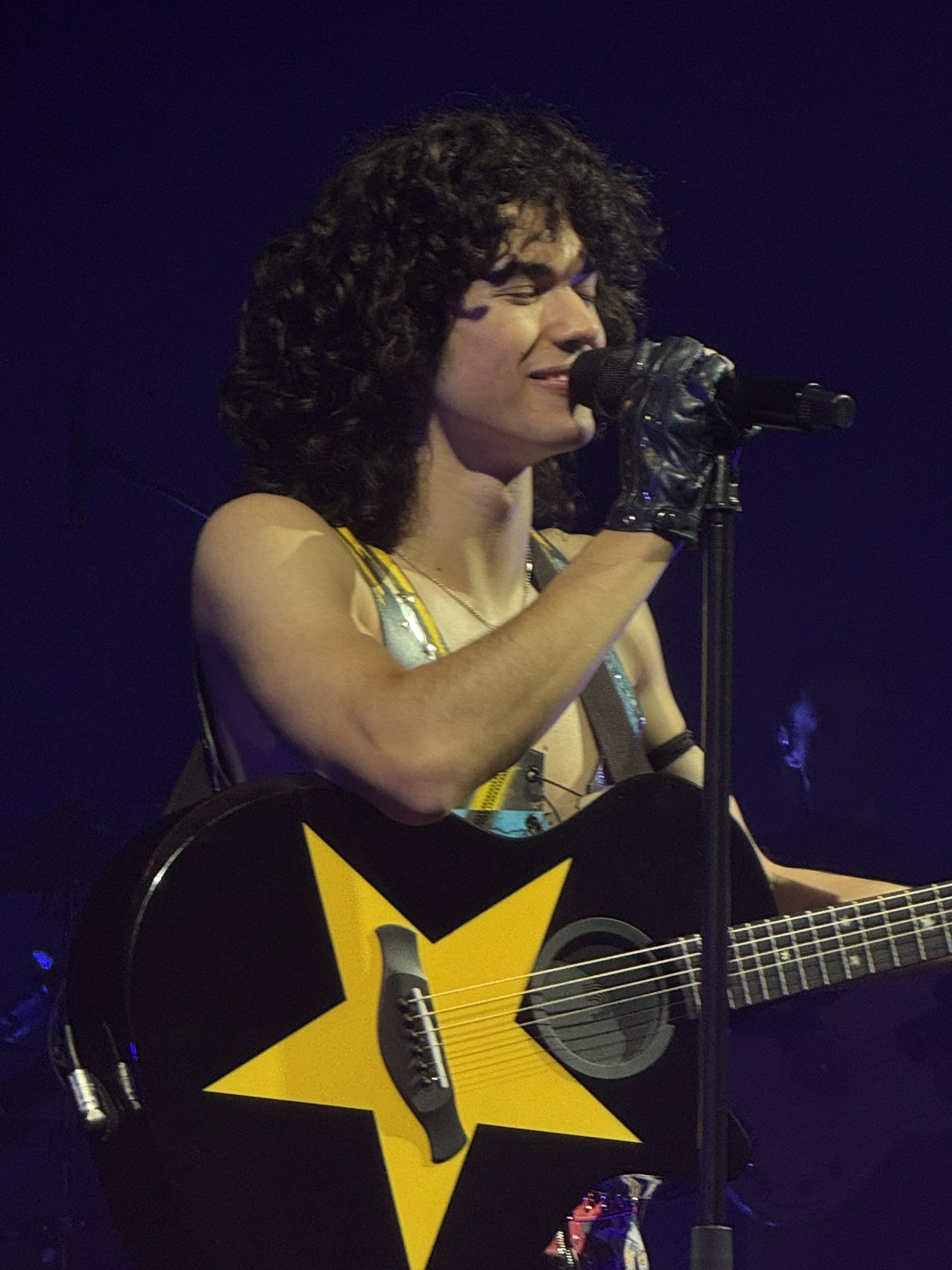
- Gray performing Found Heaven On Tour in Amsterdam (2024)
- Headlining tours: 7
- Supporting tours: 1
- Music festivals: 16
- One-off concerts: 11
- Television shows: 7
- Award shows: 1

Since the beginning of his career in 2017, Conan Gray has embarked on five concert tours and appeared as a support act on one tour. He has performed at sixteen music festivals, eleven one-off concerts, and one award show, reaching thirty countries across five continents. In 2026, he embarked on the Wishbone World Tour in support of his album Wishbone.

Gray began touring the Sunset Shows in 2018 to support his debut extended play Sunset Season (2018). After the conclusion of the tour, Gray announced the Comfort Crowd Tour, which occurred later that year.

In 2020, Gray would have toured Europe and North America with the Kid Krow Tour, but the entire tour was cancelled due to the COVID-19 pandemic. In 2022, Gray embarked on the Conan Gray World Tour 2022 and the Superache Tour. The latter lasted until 2023, taking him to Asia, Oceania, and South America for the first time.

In 2024, Gray embarked on his fifth tour, Found Heaven On Tour, to support his album Found Heaven.

== Concert tours ==
=== Headlining ===
Title	Opening acts	Associated album	Begin date	End date	Continent(s)
Sunset Shows	Girl in Red, Indoor Creature, Kian, Madi Sipes & The Painted Blue, Silver, Spencer.	Sunset Season	October 28, 2018	May 16, 2019	Europe; North America
Comfort Crowd Tour	Benee, Umi	Kid Krow	October 29, 2019	December 13, 2019	North America
Conan Gray World Tour 2022	Benee, Bülow, Mallrat	Kid Krow	March 1, 2022	June 9, 2022	Europe; North America
Superache Tour	Baby Queen, Charlie Collins, Kacy Hill, There's a Tuesday	Superache	September 16, 2022	March 26, 2023	Asia; North America; Oceania
Found Heaven On Tour	Between Friends, Maisie Peters	Found Heaven	July 11, 2024	November 10, 2024	Asia Europe; North America; Oceania
The Wishbone Pajama Show	Hemlocke Springs, Andrea Bejar	Wishbone	September 11, 2025	October 19, 2025	North America
Wishbone World Tour	Esha Tewari	Wishbone	February 19, 2026	October 8, 2026	North America; Europe; Oceania

=== Supporting ===
Title	Headlining artist	Begin date (Note: The date Gray joined the tour, not necessarily the date the tour itself started.)	End date (Note: Gray's final date on the tour, not necessarily the date the tour itself ended.)	Continent (Note: The continents in which Gray performed on the tour, not necessarily every continent the headlining artist visited.)
Pray for the Wicked Tour	Panic! at the Disco	February 15, 2019	February 20, 2019	North America

== Sunset Shows ==
Sunset Shows
- Tour by Conan Gray
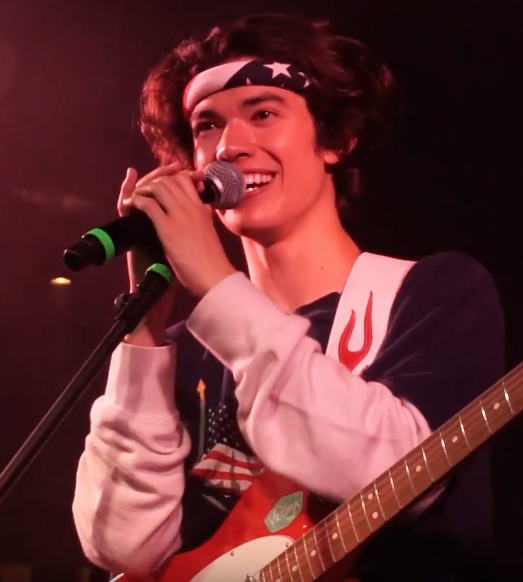
- Gray performing in Washington, D.C. on June 3, 2019.
- Location: Europe; North America
- Associated album: Sunset Season
- Start date: October 28, 2018
- End date: May 16, 2019
- No. of shows: 7 in Europe; 31 in North America; 38 in total
- Supporting acts: Girl in Red; Indoor Creature; Kian; Madi Sipes & The Painted Blue; Silver; Spencer.

Conan Gray concert chronology
- Sunset Shows (2018–2019); Comfort Crowd Tour (2019)

Sunset Shows was Gray's first concert tour, in support of his debut extended play, Sunset Season. The tour began on October 28, 2018, in Houston, Texas and ended on May 16, 2019, in Berlin, Germany. It was initially announced as a "limited run" tour of 8 cities in the United States, but a second and third leg were added for 2019 due to popular demand, including shows in Canada, England, France, Germany, and the Netherlands.

Each leg of the tour had a different opening act. On the first leg, the act was changed each night, including Indoor Creature, Madi Sipes & The Painted Blue, Silver, and Spencer. The rest of the tour had Girl in Red in North America and Kian in Europe.

=== Shows ===
Date	City	Country	Venue	Opening act
Leg 1 – North America, Part 1
October 28, 2018	Houston	United States	House of Blues (bronze peacock)	—N/a
October 29, 2018	Dallas	United States	Deep Ellum Art Co.	—N/a
October 31, 2018	Austin	United States	Stubbs Indoors	Indoor Creature
November 6, 2018	Los Angeles	United States	The Echo	Spencer.
November 7, 2018	San Francisco	United States	Rickshaw Stop	Madi Sipes & The Painted Blue
November 13, 2018	Chicago	United States	Schubas Tavern	—N/a
November 20, 2018	New York	United States	Mercury Lounge	Silver
Leg 2 – North America, Part 2
March 10, 2019	Seattle	United States	The Crocodile	Girl in Red
March 11, 2019	Portland	United States	Wonder Ballroom	Girl in Red
March 13, 2019	San Francisco	United States	August Hall	Girl in Red
March 14, 2019	Los Angeles	United States	El Rey Theatre	Girl in Red
March 16, 2019	Santa Ana	United States	The Observatory OC	Girl in Red
March 18, 2019	Phoenix	United States	Crescent Ballroom	Girl in Red
March 20, 2019	Austin	United States	Emo's	Girl in Red
March 21, 2019	Dallas	United States	House of Blues	Girl in Red
March 22, 2019	Houston	United States	House of Blues	Girl in Red
March 24, 2019	Atlanta	United States	Terminal West	Girl in Red
March 27, 2019	New York	United States	Bowery Ballroom	Girl in Red
March 28, 2019	New York	United States	Music Hall of Williamsburg	Girl in Red
March 29, 2019	Washington, D.C.	United States	U Street Music Hall	Girl in Red
March 30, 2019	Philadelphia	United States	Foundry @ The Fillmore	Girl in Red
April 2, 2019	Cambridge	United States	The Sinclair	Girl in Red
April 4, 2019	Montreal	Canada	L'Astral	Girl in Red
April 5, 2019	Toronto	Canada	Mod Club Theatre	Girl in Red
April 6, 2019	Ferndale	United States	The Loving Touch	Girl in Red
April 8, 2019	Chicago	United States	Bottom Lounge	Girl in Red
April 9, 2019	Minneapolis	United States	Fine Line Music Cafe	Girl in Red
April 10, 2019	Kansas City	United States	Record Bar	Girl in Red
April 12, 2019	Denver	United States	Bluebird Theater	Girl in Red
April 13, 2019	Salt Lake City	United States	Kilby Court	Girl in Red
Leg 3 – Europe
May 8, 2019 (Note: The show on May 8, 2019, was originally scheduled to be held at O2 Academy Islington, but the venue was upgraded due to high demand.)	London	England	O_{2} Forum Kentish Town	Kian
May 9, 2019 (Note: The shows on May 9 and 10, 2019 were part of The Great Escape Festival.)	Brighton and Hove	England	Shooshh	—N/a
May 10, 2019 (Note: The shows on May 9 and 10, 2019 were part of The Great Escape Festival.)	Brighton and Hove	England	Komedia Studio	—N/a
May 12, 2019	Amsterdam	Netherlands	Bitterzoet	—N/a
May 13, 2019 (Note: The show on May 13, 2019, was originally scheduled to be held at Les Etoiles, but the venue was upgraded due to high demand.)	Paris	France	Le Trabendo	Kian
May 14, 2019 (Note: The show on May 14, 2019, was originally scheduled to be held at Club Bahnhof Ehrenfeld, but the venue was upgraded due to high demand.)	Cologne	Germany	Kantine	Kian
May 16, 2019 (Note: The show on May 16, 2019, was originally scheduled to be held at Frannz Club, but the venue was upgraded due to high demand.)	Berlin	Germany	Columbia Theatre	Kian

== Comfort Crowd Tour ==
Comfort Crowd Tour
- Tour by Conan Gray
- Location: North America
- Start date: October 29, 2019
- End date: December 13, 2019
- Legs: 1
- No. of shows: 28
- Supporting acts: Benee; UMI

Conan Gray concert chronology
- Sunset Shows (2018–2019); Comfort Crowd Tour (2019); Conan Gray World Tour 2022 (2022)

The Comfort Crowd Tour was Gray's second headlining tour, taking place in several locations across North America. The tour began on October 29, 2019, in St. Louis, Missouri and ended on December 13, 2019, in Los Angeles, California. The tour had American musician Umi and New Zealand musician Benee as support acts.

=== Shows ===
Date (2019)	City	Country	Venue	Opening act
North America
October 29	St. Louis	United States	The Pageant	UMI
October 30	Nashville	United States	Cannery Ballroom	UMI
November 1	Chicago	United States	House of Blues	UMI
November 3	Indianapolis	United States	Deluxe at Old National Centre	UMI
November 5	Toronto	Canada	Rebel	UMI
November 7	Columbus	United States	Newport Music Hall	UMI
November 8	Detroit	United States	The Fillmore	UMI
November 9	Cleveland	United States	House of Blues	UMI
November 12	New York	United States	Terminal 5	UMI
November 13	Boston	United States	House of Blues	UMI
November 14	Philadelphia	United States	The Fillmore	UMI
November 16	Silver Spring	United States	The Fillmore	UMI
November 17	Charlotte	United States	The Fillmore	UMI
November 19	Atlanta	United States	Tabernacle	UMI
November 20	Orlando	United States	The Plaza Live	UMI
November 22	Tampa	United States	The Ritz Ybor	UMI
November 23	Fort Lauderdale	United States	Revolution Live	UMI
November 26	Houston	United States	Revention Music Center	UMI
November 27	Irving	United States	Toyota Music Factory	UMI
December 2	Denver	United States	Ogden Theatre	Benee
December 4	Salt Lake City	United States	The Depot	Benee
December 6	Vancouver	Canada	Vogue Theatre	Benee
December 7	Seattle	United States	Showbox SoDo	Benee
December 8	Portland	United States	Roseland Theater	Benee
December 10	Oakland	United States	Fox Oakland Theatre	Benee
December 11	Los Angeles	United States	The Fonda Theatre	Benee
December 12	Los Angeles	United States	The Fonda Theatre	Benee
December 13	Los Angeles	United States	The Fonda Theatre	Benee

== Kid Krow World Tour ==
Kid Krow World Tour
- Tour by Conan Gray (cancelled)
- Location: Europe; North America; Oceania
- Associated album: Kid Krow
- Start date: April 26, 2020
- End date: October 16, 2020 (Note: October 16 was the end date based on the shows that had been announced. It is possible that the date would have been later.)
- Legs: 4 (Note: There were 4 legs announced prior to its cancellation, but there likely would have been more.)
- No. of shows: 21 in Europe; 4 in North America; 3 in Oceania; 28 in total (Note: There were 28 shows announced prior to its cancellation, but there likely would have been more.)
- Supporting act: Bülow

Conan Gray concert chronology
- Comfort Crowd Tour (2019); Kid Krow World Tour cancelled (2020); Conan Gray World Tour (2022)

The Kid Krow World Tour was intended to be Gray's third headlining tour, in support of his debut studio album Kid Krow (2020). The tour was set to begin on April 26, 2020, and conclude on October 16, 2020, but was cancelled due to the COVID-19 pandemic. In February 2020, Gray announced the European leg of the tour with support from Bülow. Gray and Bülow later embarked on the Conan Gray World Tour 2022.

=== Cancelled shows ===
Date (2020)	City	Country	Venue	Opening act
Leg 1 – Europe
April 26	Oslo	Norway	Parkteatret	Bülow
April 27	Stockholm	Sweden	Debbaser	Bülow
April 28	Copenhagen	Denmark	Vega	Bülow
April 30	Amsterdam	Netherlands	Melkweg	Bülow
May 1	Berlin	Germany	Huxley's	Bülow
May 2	Hamburg	Germany	Gruenspan	Bülow
May 5	Cologne	Germany	Live Music Hall	Bülow
May 6	Esch-sur-Alzette	Luxembourg	Rockhal	Bülow
May 7	Zürich	Switzerland	X-tra	Bülow
May 9	Warsaw	Poland	Progresja	Bülow
May 11	Vienna	Austria	WUK	Bülow
May 12	Munich	Germany	Backstage Werk	Bülow
May 13	Milan	Italy	Magazzini Generali	Bülow
May 15	Madrid	Spain	Sala But	Bülow
May 16	Barcelona	Spain	Razzmatazz	Bülow
May 19	Paris	France	Le Trianon	Bülow
May 21	Birmingham	England	Digbeth Institute	Bülow
May 22	Glasgow	Scotland	SWG3 Galvanizers	Bülow
May 23	Manchester	England	The Ritz	Bülow
May 26	London	England	Shepherd's Bush Empire	Bülow
May 30	Dublin	Ireland	Olympia Theatre	Bülow
Leg 2 – North America
June 18 (Note: The show on June 18, 2020 would have been part of Firefly Music Festival.)	Dover	United States	The Woodlands of Dover Motor Speedway	—N/a
Leg 3 – Oceania
September 23	Brisbane	Australia	Fortitude Music Hall	—N/a
September 24	Melbourne	Australia	The Forum	—N/a
September 26	Sydney	Australia	Luna Park	—N/a
Leg 4 – North America
October 9 (Note: The shows on October 9, 11 and 16, 2020 would have been part of Coachella.)	Indio	United States	Empire Polo Club	—N/a
October 11 (Note: The shows on October 9, 11 and 16, 2020 would have been part of Coachella.)	Indio	United States	Empire Polo Club	—N/a
October 16 (Note: The shows on October 9, 11 and 16, 2020 would have been part of Coachella.)	Indio	United States	Empire Polo Club	—N/a

== Conan Gray World Tour 2022 ==
Conan Gray World Tour 2022
- Tour by Conan Gray
- Location: Europe; North America
- Associated album: Kid Krow
- Start date: March 1, 2022
- End date: June 9, 2022
- Legs: 2
- No. of shows: 30 in North America 24 in Europe 54 in total
- Supporting acts: Benee; Bülow; Mallrat

Conan Gray concert chronology
- Comfort Crowd Tour (2019); Conan Gray World Tour 2022 (2022); Superache Tour (2022–2023)

The Conan Gray World Tour 2022 was Gray's third concert tour, in support of his debut studio album Kid Krow (2020). beginning on March 1, 2022, in Dallas, and concluded on June 9, 2022, in London. It comprised 54 shows across North America and Europe. Opening acts included Bülow in North America and Mallrat in Europe. Additionally, Benee opened for the show in Berlin.

=== Shows ===
Date (2022)	City	Country	Venue	Opening acts
Leg 1 – North America
March 1	Dallas	United States	South Side Ballroom	Bülow
March 2	Austin	United States	ACL Live at The Moody Theatre	Bülow
March 3	Houston	United States	713 Music Hall	Bülow
March 5	Atlanta	United States	Coca-Cola Roxy	Bülow
March 6	Nashville	United States	Ryman Auditorium	Bülow
March 9	Miami Beach	United States	The Fillmore	Bülow
March 11	Charlotte	United States	The Fillmore	Bülow
March 12	Washington, D.C.	United States	The Anthem	Bülow
March 13	Philadelphia	United States	The Fillmore	Bülow
March 16	New York	United States	Radio City Music Hall	Bülow
March 17	Boston	United States	Orpheum Theatre	Bülow
March 20	Montreal	Canada	M Telus	Bülow
March 21	Toronto	Canada	History	Bülow
March 22	Toronto	Canada	History	Bülow
March 23	Cincinnati	United States	The Andrew J. Brady Music Center	Bülow
March 25	Chicago	United States	Aragon Ballroom	Bülow
March 26	Indianapolis	United States	Old National Centre	Bülow
March 27	Detroit	United States	The Fillmore	Bülow
March 30	Milwaukee	United States	The Rave	Bülow
March 31	Minneapolis	United States	The Armory	Bülow
April 4	Calgary	Canada	MacEwan Ballroom	Bülow
April 5	Edmonton	Canada	Winspear Centre	Bülow
April 7	Vancouver	Canada	Queen Elizabeth Theatre	Bülow
April 8	Seattle	United States	The Moore Theatre	Bülow
April 9	Seattle	United States	The Moore Theatre	Bülow
April 11	Portland	United States	Arlene Schnitzer Concert Hall	Bülow
April 13	Oakland (Note: Promoted as San Francisco)	United States	Fox Theatre	Bülow
April 14	Oakland	United States	Fox Theatre	Bülow
April 16 (Note: The shows on April 16 and 23, 2022 were part of Coachella.)	Indio	United States	Empire Polo Club	—N/a
April 18	Phoenix	United States	The Van Buren	Bülow
April 20	Denver	United States	Mission Ballroom	Bülow
April 23 (Note: The shows on April 16 and 23, 2022 were part of Coachella.)	Indio	United States	Empire Polo Club	—N/a
Leg 2 – Europe
May 5	Oslo	Norway	Sentrum Scene	Mallrat
May 6	Stockholm	Sweden	Annexet	Mallrat
May 7	Copenhagen	Denmark	K.B. Hallen	Mallrat
May 9	Hamburg	Germany	Edel-optics.de Arena	Mallrat
May 10	Berlin	Germany	Verti Music Hall	Mallrat, Benee
May 11	Warsaw	Poland	COS Torwar	Mallrat
May 13	Munich	Germany	Tonhalle	Mallrat
May 14	Prague	Czechia	Forum Karlin	Mallrat
May 15	Vienna	Austria	Gasometer	Mallrat
May 17	Zurich	Switzerland	Volkshaus	Mallrat
May 18	Milan	Italy	Fabrique	Mallrat
May 20	Barcelona	Spain	Saint Jordi Club	Mallrat
May 21	Madrid	Spain	Palacio Vistalegre	Mallrat
May 24	Paris	France	L'Olympia	Mallrat
May 25	Brussels	Belgium	Ancienne Belgique	Mallrat
May 26	Cologne	Germany	Palladium	Mallrat
May 27	Amsterdam	Netherlands	AFAS Live	Mallrat
May 30	Dublin	Ireland	3Olympia Theatre	Mallrat
June 2	Glasgow	Scotland	O_{2} Academy	Mallrat
June 3	Leeds	England	O_{2} Academy	Mallrat
June 4	Manchester	England	O_{2} Victoria Warehouse	Mallrat
June 6	Birmingham	England	O_{2} Academy	Mallrat
June 8	Bristol	England	O_{2} Academy	Mallrat
June 9	London	England	Eventim Apollo	Mallrat

== Superache Tour ==
Superache Tour
- Tour by Conan Gray
- Location: Asia; North America; Oceania; South America
- Associated album: Superache
- Start date: September 16, 2022
- End date: March 26, 2023
- Legs: 4
- No. of shows: 22 in North America; 4 in Oceania; 7 in Asia; 4 in South America; 37 in total

Conan Gray concert chronology
- Conan Gray World Tour 2022 (2022); Superache Tour (2022–2023); Found Heaven On Tour (2024)

The Superache Tour was Gray's fourth headlining tour, in support of his second studio album Superache (2022). The tour began on September 16, 2022, in Louisville, Kentucky, and ended on March 26, 2023, in Bogotá, Colombia. The tour visited thirteen countries across four continents.

The tour marked Gray's first performances in New Zealand and South America, as well as his first tour of Asia and Australia.

=== Shows ===
Date	City	Country	Venue	Opening act
Leg 1 – North America
September 16, 2022	Louisville	United States	Palace Theatre	Kacy Hill
September 18, 2022	St. Augustine	United States	St. Augustine Amphitheatre	Kacy Hill
September 20, 2022	Lake Buena Vista (Note: Promoted as Orlando)	United States	House of Blues	Kacy Hill
September 22, 2022	Moon Township (Note: Promoted as Pittsburgh)	United States	UPMC Events Center	Kacy Hill
September 24, 2022	Cleveland	United States	Jacobs Pavilion	Kacy Hill
September 25, 2022 (Note: The show on September 25 in Dover, Delaware was part of Firefly Music Festival.)	Dover	United States	The Woodlands of Dover International Speedway	—N/a
September 28, 2022	Chicago	United States	Huntington Bank Pavilion	Kacy Hill
September 30, 2022	Columbus	United States	KEMBA Live!	Kacy Hill
October 1, 2022	Bloomington	United States	Indiana University Auditorium	Kacy Hill
October 3, 2022	Chesterfield	United States	The Factory	Baby Queen
October 5, 2022	Oklahoma City	United States	The Criterion	Baby Queen
October 8, 2022 (Note: The shows on October 8 and 14 were part of the Austin City Limits Music Festival.)	Austin	United States	Zilker Park	—N/a
October 9, 2022	El Paso	United States	Plaza Theatre	Baby Queen
October 12, 2022	San Antonio	United States	Aztec Theatre	Baby Queen
October 13, 2022	San Antonio	United States	Aztec Theatre	Baby Queen
October 14, 2022 (Note: The shows on October 8 and 14 were part of the Austin City Limits Music Festival.)	Austin	United States	Zilker Park	—N/a
October 17, 2022	Salt Lake City	United States	The Union	Baby Queen
October 19, 2022	Los Angeles	United States	Greek Theatre	Baby Queen
October 20, 2022	Los Angeles	United States	Greek Theatre	Baby Queen
October 22, 2022	San Diego	United States	SOMA Mainstage	Baby Queen
October 23, 2022	San Diego	United States	SOMA Mainstage	Baby Queen
October 25, 2022	Paradise (Note: Promoted as Las Vegas)	United States	Brooklyn Bowl	Baby Queen
Leg 2 – Oceania
November 13, 2022	Auckland	New Zealand	Spark Arena	There's a Tuesday
November 15, 2022	Brisbane	Australia	Fortitude Music Hall	Charlie Collins
November 18, 2022	Sydney	Australia	Hordern Pavilion	Charlie Collins
November 19, 2022	Melbourne	Australia	Margaret Court Arena	Charlie Collins
Leg 3 – Asia
February 14, 2023	Osaka	Japan	Namba Hatch	—N/a
February 16, 2023	Yokohama	Japan	Pacifico Yokohama	—N/a
February 18, 2023	Pasay (Note: Promoted as Manila)	Philippines	SM Mall of Asia Arena	—N/a
February 20, 2023	Singapore		The Star Theatre	—N/a
February 22, 2023	Pak Kret (Note: Promoted as Bangkok)	Thailand	Impact Exhibition Hall 5	—N/a
February 25, 2023	Taipei	Taiwan	Taipei International Convention Center	—N/a
February 28, 2023	Seoul	South Korea	KSPO Dome	—N/a
Leg 4 – South America
March 17, 2023 (Note: The show on March 17, 2023, was part of Lollapalooza Chile.)	Santiago	Chile	Bicentennial Park	—N/a
March 19, 2023 (Note: The show on March 19, 2023, was part of Lollapalooza Argentina.)	San Isidro (Note: Promoted as Buenos Aires)	Argentina	Hipódromo de San Isidro	—N/a
March 24, 2023 (Note: The show on March 24, 2023, was part of Lollapalooza Brazil.)	São Paulo	Brazil	Interlagos Circuit	—N/a
March 26, 2023 (Note: The show on March 26, 2023, was part of Festival Estéreo Picnic.)	Sopó (Note: Promoted as Bogotá)	Colombia	Briceño 18	—N/a

==== Cancelled shows ====
List of cancelled concerts showing date, city, country, venue and reason for cancellation
Date	City	Country	Venue	Reason
September 17, 2022 (Note: The show on September 17 in Atlanta, Georgia would have been part of the Music Midtown Festival.)	Atlanta	United States	Piedmont Park	Festival cancelled due to Georgia's gun laws.

== The Wishbone Pajama Show ==
The Wishbone Pajama Show
- Tour by Conan Gray
- Location: North America
- Associated album: Wishbone
- Start date: September 11, 2025
- End date: October 19, 2025
- No. of shows: 19
- Supporting acts: Hemlocke Springs; Andrea Bejar

Conan Gray concert chronology
- Found Heaven On Tour (2024); The Wishbone Pajama Show (2025); Wishbone World Tour (2026)

A week after the album's announcement, on May 29, Gray announced the Wishbone Pajama Show to support the album, featuring nineteen dates in North America. It marked his sixth headlining concert tour. The tour began on September 11, 2025, in Cuyahoga Falls, Ohio, and concluded on October 19, 2025, in Monterrey, Mexico. Hemlocke Springs served as the opening act in the United States, while Andrea Bejar served as the opening act in Mexico.

=== Set list ===
This set list is obtained from the September 19, 2025 show in Bridgeport. It is not intended to represent all dates throughout the tour.

1. "My World"
2. "Never Ending Song"
3. "Bourgeoisieses"
4. "Wish You Were Sober"
5. "Class Clown"
6. "People Watching"
7. "The Cut That Always Bleeds"
8. "Eleven Eleven"
9. "Nauseous"
10. "Romeo"
11. "This Song"
12. "Care"
13. "Heather"
14. "Family Line"
15. "Connell"
16. "Actor"
17. "Maniac"
18. "Vodka Cranberry"

Encore

19. "Memories"
20. "Caramel"

=== Shows ===
Concert dates and locations for the Wishbone Pajama Shows
Date (2025)	City	Country	Venue	Supporting acts
September 11	Cuyahoga Falls	United States	Blossom Music Center	Hemlocke Springs
September 13	Cincinnati	United States	Riverbend Music Center	Hemlocke Springs
September 14	Tinley Park	United States	Credit Union 1 Amphitheatre	Hemlocke Springs
September 16	Pittsburgh	United States	Petersen Events Center	Hemlocke Springs
September 17	Clarkston	United States	Pine Knob Music Theatre	Hemlocke Springs
September 19	Bridgeport	United States	Hartford HealthCare Amphitheater	Hemlocke Springs
September 20	Fairfax	United States	EagleBank Arena	Hemlocke Springs
September 22	Hollywood	United States	Hard Rock Live	Hemlocke Springs
September 24	Nashville	United States	Ascend Amphitheater	Hemlocke Springs
September 26	Charlotte	United States	PNC Music Pavilion	Hemlocke Springs
September 28	Maryland Heights (Note: Labeled as St. Louis in promotional material.)	United States	Hollywood Casino Amphitheatre	Hemlocke Springs
September 29	Kansas City	United States	Starlight Theatre	Hemlocke Springs
October 1	West Valley City	United States	Utah First Credit Union Amphitheatre	Hemlocke Springs
October 3	Mountain View	United States	Shoreline Amphitheatre	Hemlocke Springs
October 4	San Diego	United States	Viejas Arena	Hemlocke Springs
October 6	Morrison	United States	Red Rocks Amphitheatre	Hemlocke Springs
October 16	Mexico City	Mexico	Palacio de los Deportes	Andrea Bejar
October 17	Guadalajara	Mexico	Telmex Auditorium	Andrea Bejar
October 19	Monterrey	Mexico	Auditorio Banamex	Andrea Bejar

== Wishbone World Tour ==
Wishbone World Tour
- Tour by Conan Gray
- Location: Europe; North America; Oceania
- Associated album: Wishbone
- Start date: February 19, 2026
- End date: October 8, 2026
- Legs: 3
- No. of shows: 42
- Supporting act: Esha Tewari

Conan Gray concert chronology
- The Wishbone Pajama Show (2025); Wishbone World Tour (2026)

The Wishbone World Tour was Gray's seventh headlining tour and his first all-arena tour, as well as the second tour to promote his fourth studio album, Wishbone (2025). The tour began on February 19, 2026, in Minneapolis, Minnesota, and concluded on October 8, 2026, in Perth, Western Australia, consisting of 42 concerts.

=== Set list ===
This set list is obtained from the February 19, 2026 show in Minneapolis. It is not intended to represent all dates throughout the tour.

1. "My World"
2. "Never Ending Song"
3. "Care"
4. "Wish You Were Sober"
5. "Class Clown"
6. "People Watching"
7. "The Cut That Always Bleeds"
8. "Eleven Eleven"
9. "Nauseous"
10. "Acoustic Surprise Song"
11. "Romeo"
12. "The Best"
13. "Lookalike"
14. "Heather"
15. "Family Line"
16. "Connell"
17. "Actor"
18. "Maniac"
19. "Vodka Cranberry"

Encore

20. "Memories"
21. "Caramel"

=== Shows ===
Concert dates and locations for the Wishbone World Tour
Date (2026)	City	Country	Venue	Supporting acts
Leg 1 – North America
February 19	Minneapolis	United States	Target Center	Esha Tewari
February 21	Fishers	United States	Fishers Event Center	Esha Tewari
February 23	Toronto	Canada	Scotiabank Arena	Esha Tewari
February 25	Boston	United States	TD Garden	Esha Tewari
February 27	Newark	United States	Prudential Center	Esha Tewari
February 28	Elmont (Note: Labeled as Belmont Park in promotional material.)	United States	UBS Arena	Esha Tewari
March 2	Philadelphia	United States	Xfinity Mobile Arena	Esha Tewari
March 4	Raleigh	United States	Lenovo Center	Esha Tewari
March 6	Atlanta	United States	State Farm Arena	Esha Tewari
March 7	Orlando	United States	Kia Center	Esha Tewari
March 10	Fort Worth	United States	Dickies Arena	Esha Tewari
March 11	Houston	United States	Toyota Center	Esha Tewari
March 13	Glendale	United States	Desert Diamond Arena	Esha Tewari
March 16	Seattle	United States	Climate Pledge Arena	Esha Tewari
March 18	Sacramento	United States	Golden 1 Center	Esha Tewari
March 20	Inglewood	United States	Kia Forum	Esha Tewari
Leg 2 – Europe
May 5	Dublin	Ireland	3 Arena	Esha Tewari
May 7	Birmingham	England	bp pulse LIVE	Esha Tewari
May 9	Manchester	England	AO Arena	Esha Tewari
May 10	Glasgow	Scotland	OVO Hydro	Esha Tewari
May 12	London	England	The O2 Arena	Esha Tewari
May 14	Amsterdam	Netherlands	Ziggo Dome	Esha Tewari
May 15	Antwerp	Belgium	AFAS Dome	Esha Tewari
May 16	Düsseldorf	Germany	Mitsubishi Electric Halle	Esha Tewari
May 18	Paris	France	Adidas Arena	Esha Tewari
May 19	Paris	France	Adidas Arena	Esha Tewari
May 21	Hamburg	Germany	Sporthalle Hamburg	Esha Tewari
May 23	Oslo	Norway	Unity Arena	Esha Tewari
May 25	Stockholm	Sweden	Avicii Arena	Esha Tewari
May 26	Copenhagen	Denmark	Royal Arena	Esha Tewari
May 28	Berlin	Germany	Max-Schmeling-Halle	Esha Tewari
May 29	Kraków	Poland	Tauron Arena Kraków	Esha Tewari
May 31	Prague (Note: The May 31, 2026 concert in Prague at O2 Arena was originally scheduled to take place at O2 Universum, but was rescheduled due to high demand.)	Czech Republic	O2 Arena	Esha Tewari
June 1	Vienna	Austria	Wiener Stadthalle	Esha Tewari
June 3	Bergamo	Italy	ChorusLife Arena	Esha Tewari
June 6	Madrid	Spain	Palacio Vistalegre	Esha Tewari
June 7	Lisbon	Portugal	MEO Arena	Esha Tewari
Leg 3 – Oceania
September 26	Auckland	New Zealand	Spark Arena	Esha Tewari
September 29	Brisbane	Australia	Brisbane Entertainment Centre	Esha Tewari
October 1	Sydney	Australia	Afterpay Arena	Esha Tewari
October 3	Melbourne	Australia	Rod Laver Arena	Esha Tewari
October 5	Adelaide	Australia	Adelaide Entertainment Centre	Esha Tewari
October 8	Perth	Australia	RAC Arena	Esha Tewari

== Television performances ==
Air date	Program	City	Country	Performed song(s)	Ref.
January 31, 2019	Late Night with Seth Meyers	New York	United States	"Crush Culture"	
November 4, 2019	Vevo DSCVR 2020: Artists to Watch	New York	United States	"Maniac"; "Comfort Crowd"	
November 11, 2019	MTV Office Hours	New York	United States	"Checkmate"; "Comfort Crowd"; "Maniac"	
February 20, 2020	MTV Stripped	Sydney	Australia	"Love Story"; "Maniac"	
October 7, 2020	The Late Late Show with James Corden	Los Angeles	United States	"Heather"	
June 23, 2022	The Tonight Show Starring Jimmy Fallon	New York	United States	"Disaster"	
June 24, 2022	The Today Show	New York	United States	"Disaster"; "People Watching"; "Memories"; "Heather"	
July 12, 2022	Sukkiri	Tokyo	Japan	"Disaster"	
July 16, 2022	Venue 101	Tokyo	Japan	"Disaster"	
August 3, 2022	Live from Vevo Studio	New York	United States	"Disaster"; "Memories"	
August 5, 2022	Buzz Rhythm 02	Tokyo	Japan	"Disaster"	
August 9, 2022	The Show	Seoul	South Korea	"Memories"	
August 28, 2022	MTV Video Music Awards	Newark	United States	"Disaster"; "Memories"	
April 4, 2024	Jimmy Kimmel Live!	Los Angeles	United States	"Alley Rose"	
April 9, 2024	GMA	New York	United States	"Alley Rose"	
August 15, 2025	The Today Show	New York	United States	"This Song"; "Vodka Cranberry"; "Caramel"; "Heather"	
September 7, 2025	MTV Video Music Awards	New York	United States	"Vodka Cranberry"	
November 27, 2025	Macy's Thanksgiving Day Parade	New York	United States	"Vodka Cranberry"	

== Other performances ==
Date	Event	City	Country	Venue	Ref.
February 15, 2019	Pray for the Wicked Tour (Note: On these shows, Gray was the opening act for Panic! at the Disco.)	Inglewood	United States	Kia Forum	
February 16, 2019	Pray for the Wicked Tour	San Diego	United States	Pechanga Arena	
February 19, 2019	Pray for the Wicked Tour	Oakland	United States	Oracle Arena	
February 20, 2019	Pray for the Wicked Tour	Sacramento	United States	Golden 1 Center	
August 2, 2019	Lollapalooza	Chicago	United States	Grant Park	
September 4, 2019	Free private concert (Note: Tickets could be attained by winning a contest on Gray's website.)	West Hollywood	United States	Troubadour	
September 10, 2019	Free private concert	New York	United States	Public Arts	
September 20, 2019	Life Is Beautiful Music & Art Festival	Las Vegas	United States	Downtown Las Vegas	
February 11, 2020	—N/a	Sydney	Australia	The Metro Theatre (The Lair)	
September 18, 2021	iHeartRadio Music Festival	Las Vegas	United States	Area15	
June 24, 2022	Café Gray (Note: A free pop-up café event, during which Gray appeared and performed an acoustic set.)	New York	United States	The Flat	
July 15, 2022	Japan Debut Showcase (Note: Tickets could be attained by winning a contest on the Universal Music Japan website. To enter the contest, you could either save the album on streaming services, post a Tweet, or call select radio shows.)	Tokyo	Japan	Duo Music Exchange	
July 18, 2022	Major League Baseball Home Run Derby	Los Angeles	United States	Dodger Stadium	
August 7, 2022	Haus of Wonder	Goyang	South Korea	Korea International Exhibition Center	
September 7, 2022	Spotlight	Los Angeles	United States	Clive Davis Theatre	
August 4, 2023	WiLD 94.9's Wazzmatazz	Mountain View	United States	Shoreline Amphitheatre	
August 12, 2023	Outside Lands	San Francisco	United States	Golden Gate Park	
September 23, 2023	Global Citizen Festival	New York	United States	Great Lawn	
March 1, 2024	Solo acoustic performance + Q&A	Edinburgh	Scotland	The Caves	
March 3, 2024 (two shows)	Solo acoustic performance + Q&A	Brighton	England	Concorde 2	
March 4, 2024 (two shows)	Solo acoustic performance + Q&A	London	England	Przym	
March 20, 2024	Join Me for the Night	Los Angeles	United States	The Echo	
April 9, 2024	Acoustic performance + Q&A	New York	United States	Urban Outfitters	
April 11, 2024	Acoustic performance	Los Angeles	United States	Amoeba Hollywood	
August 1, 2024	Lollapalooza	Chicago	United States	Grant Park	
August 4, 2024	Lollapalooza	Chicago	United States	Grant Park	
August 23, 2025	Reading and Leeds Festivals	Reading	England	Little John's Farm	
August 24, 2025	Reading and Leeds Festivals	Leeds	England	Bramham Park	
December 5, 2025	iHeartRadio Jingle Ball Tour	Los Angeles	United States	Intuit Dome	
December 9, 2025	iHeartRadio Jingle Ball Tour	Detroit	United States	Little Caesars Arena	
December 12, 2025	iHeartRadio Jingle Ball Tour	New York City	United States	Madison Square Garden	
December 16, 2025	iHeartRadio Jingle Ball Tour	Washington D.C.	United States	Capital One Arena	
