= Wishbone (album) =

2025 studio album by Conan Gray

Studio album by Conan Gray
- Released: August 15, 2025
- Recorded: 2023–2025
- Genres: Pop; pop rock
- Length: 43:21
- Label: Republic
- Producers: Dan Nigro; Ethan Gruska; Noah Conrad; Elvira Anderfjärd; Luka Kloser; Jon Buscema

Conan Gray chronology
Kid Krow, Decomposed (5 Year Anniversary) (2025)	Wishbone (2025)

Singles from Wishbone
- 1. "This Song" Released: May 30, 2025; 2. "Vodka Cranberry" Released: July 11, 2025; 3. "Caramel" Released: August 15, 2025

Singles from Wishbone Deluxe
- 1. "The Best" Released: March 27, 2026

Wishbone is the fourth studio album by American singer-songwriter Conan Gray. It was released on August 15, 2025, through Republic Records. Having released his third album, Found Heaven (2024) only a year prior, Gray spent two years quietly working on Wishbone while on tour for Found Heaven and while making Found Heaven. It has primarily been described as a pop and pop rock record influenced by '90s pop and alternative rock. To support the album, Gray went on the Wishbone Pajama Show in September and October 2025 and has been on the Wishbone World Tour since February 19, 2026.

A deluxe edition of the album was announced on March 21, 2026, and was released on April 24, 2026. "The Best", one of the new tracks included on the edition, was released on March 27, 2026.

== Background and release ==
In 2024, Conan Gray released his third studio album, Found Heaven, and embarked on his fifth headlining concert tour, Found Heaven On Tour. On May 22, 2025, Gray announced his fourth studio album, Wishbone, revealing that he had been slowly working on new music over the previous two years while on tour. He also discussed the writing process, stating that "before [he] knew it [he] was surrounded by an album" that he had not initially planned to release. The lead single of Wishbone, titled "This Song", was released on May 30. Wishbone is the first album that Gray owns the rights to. To support the album, Gray is set to embark on the Wishbone Pajama Show in September and October 2025. The second single, "Vodka Cranberry", which appears as the album's third track, was released on July 11, 2025. The third single, "Caramel", was released with the album. The music videos for "This Song", "Vodka Cranberry", and "Caramel" were released together as a short film titled The Wishbone Trilogy on August 28, 2025.

The 12-track record sees him reuniting with producer Dan Nigro, whom he enlisted as executive producer. Additionally, he collaborated with Ethan Gruska, Noah Conrad, Elvira Anderfjärd and Luka Kloser. Gray further revealed that there was no real incentive for him to record; he "just was." Initially, he kept the songs he recorded away from friends or his label but later realized that he "needed" the music. Gray started to see himself "in full picture" with songs he had always seen himself writing before but never did. He referred to the set of tracks as "an egregiously niche soundtrack to our own lives in real time". The album, described by Gray as his "wet dream album", goes on a journey of his relationship as he goes through heartbreak, grief, anger, and realization. Gray explains his assignment when creating the album was to do anything he wanted visually as long as it felt real to him. He says he knew very early on that he wanted to be in a sailor costume jumping in the air with a huge wishbone to symbolize jumping right into the center of the heartbreak. In his interview with People Magazine, Gray shares the beginning of the writing process. He explains that it was "really naturally manifested", with each song relieving and freeing him. Gray says he wrote this album "to draw in people who've been heartbroken. No matter who you are, where you're from, whether you've dated someone or never dated anybody [...] that feeling of rejection and having to redefine yourself after losing someone is one of the most unanimous feelings of being a human being".

On March 21, 2026, Gray announced a deluxe edition of the album titled Wishbone Deluxe. It is set to be released on April 24. "The Best", the lead single from the deluxe edition, was released on March 27.

A week and a half before the deluxe came out, April 15, 2026, Gray had fans on an internet scavenger hunt to uncover the titles to the deluxe songs. Some of these were on his Instagram status and a crossword puzzle.

== Composition ==
Wishbone has primarily been described as a pop and pop rock record, pulling notable influences from styles like 90's pop, classic pop, alternative rock, and grunge.

The album opening track is "Actor", where Gray compares love to someone hiding behind a mask. "This Song" explores hope and yearning towards someone. In "Vodka Cranberry", Gray explores the detachment of a straining relationship.

In "Romeo", Gray accepts the frustration and pain of realizing someone undeserving of your love, and turns it into a powerful release of anger. "My World" further explores the release of pain and adds a further contrast from the first three songs of the album. "Class Clown" reflect someone hiding pain behind a mask of laughter while feeling like everyone is watching and laughing at you. Gray describes this song as one of his favorites on the album. "Nauseous" explores how trauma can develop after a toxic relationship.

In "Caramel", Gray captures the yearning of a past relationship while also understanding the toxicity present. "Connell" explores the lesson learned from an exhausting heartbreak. The title references one of the main characters of Sally Rooney's novel, Normal People "Sunset Tower" explores the dynamics between wishing a past partner the best but also feeling bittersweet about them moving on. On "Eleven Eleven", Gray yearns for what once was as he connects superstition to his heartbreak. The album closes with "Care", whereby Gray accepts his grief and heartbreak while embracing the idea that moving on does not mean forgetting about the past.

== Tours ==
A week from the album's announcement, on May 29, Gray announced the Wishbone Pajama Show to support the album, featuring nineteen dates in North America. It marked his sixth headlining concert tour. The tour began on September 11, 2025, in Cuyahoga Falls, Ohio, and concluded on October 19, 2025, in Monterrey, Mexico. Hemlocke Springs served as the opening act in the United States, while Andrea Bejar served as the opening act in Mexico.

Act I of the tour begins with Gray riding on stage with a bicycle in a sailor outfit. The act is set in a field with a windmill, mailbox and tall mounds of grass. In the second act, Gray takes his sailor coat off, revealing a sparkly blue and white striped pajamas. Here, the set shifts to a dreamy ambiance with red lighting and big clouds while Gray lies on a bed set center stage. Act III changes with the set of a large lake. Here, Gray adds a surprise song not featured on the setlist, one of the most anticipated parts of the show. He picks an audience member to break a wishbone with him, and whoever gets the larger half gets to pick between two songs. The last act of the show focuses on moving past the grief of the last two acts. Before the encore, Gray teases his departure as he leaves while the audience yells his name to come back. He returns in a sparkly suit and sings his last two songs of the night. All of the costumes are done by stylist Katie Qian.

In Gray's tour announcement post on his Instagram May 29, he notes that pajamas are encouraged but not required. This has led fans to show up in pajama sets and sailor hats, specifically in light blue and white, similar to one of Gray's tour costumes.

On October 20, 2025, Conan took to Instagram to announce the "Wishbone World Tour" after mailboxes started to pop up at different event centers around the world. The tour started on February 19, 2026, in Minneapolis, MN and concluded on October 8 in Perth, Australia. For this tour, Esha Tewari served as the opening act for all dates.

== Critical reception ==
Professional ratings
Aggregate scores
Source	Rating
Metacritic	82/100
Review scores
Source	Rating
AllMusic	4.5/5 stars
Clash	8/10
DIY	3.5/5 stars
Rolling Stone	3.5/5 stars

Wishbone was met with widespread acclaim from music critics after its release. On Metacritic, which assigns a normalized score out of 100 to ratings from publications, the album received a score of 82 based on 4 reviews, indicating "universal acclaim".

Melvin Boateng of Clash gave the album an eight out of ten, and wrote "'Wishbone' stands as a confident pop statement, pairing Gray's impressive vocal prowess with sleek, polished production". Matt Collar of AllMusic wrote "Wishbone is a complete arc, capturing both the elated, tidal-wave euphoria of falling in love and the bittersweet comedown off that wave. And it's not just the feelings of love, but the tastes, the smells, and the thrilling sweaty intimacy of being close to another person in every sense that Gray embodies". Brittany Spanos of Rolling Stone wrote: "For as vulnerable as much of the music feels, Gray wears his heart proudly on his sleeve. He's never sounded more confident or comfortable, a thrilling promise of what's to come from him in the future". Bella Martin of DIY wrote "If he's trying things on for size still, then most of Wishbone fits Conan Gray rather well, his not-quite-angst meeting its musical equivalent in its not-quite-alternative sound". Anlin Wei of The Observer critiques some songs, calling the processing of "This Song" "overly compressed and reminiscent of the sound quality of tinny laptop speakers" and comparing "My World" to Benson Boone's "Mystical Magical" with its "excessive falsetto". Wei writes that listening to the album multiple times gives the best experience, as many minor details may be missed the first time around. Overall, the general critical opinion of Wishbone is positive with critiques mainly for repetitive topics and unusual production.

Conan Gray's Video Music Awards (VMAs) 2025 performance went viral for his set, special cameo, and vocals.

== Commercial performance ==
Wishbone debuted at number three on the Billboard 200 chart with 71,000 album-equivalent units, including 53,000 album sales and 18,000 streaming-equivalent units. It marked Gray’s largest week by both equivalent units and album sales, his third top-ten album, and his highest-charting album in the United States. The album also debuted at number one on the Billboard Top Album Sales chart, becoming Gray’s first number-one album on the chart. It additionally became his second number-one on the Vinyl Albums chart, selling more than 30,000 vinyl copies during its opening week.

In the United Kingdom, Wishbone debuted at number two in the UK Albums Chart, becoming Gray’s highest-charting album there and his third consecutive top-ten album. In Australia, Wishbone reached number two on the ARIA Album Charts, eclipsing Gray’s previous peak of number eight with Superache.

== Track listing ==
All tracks are written by Conan Gray, except where noted.

Standard track listing
No.	Title	Writer(s)	Producer(s)	Length
1.	"Actor"	Conan Gray; Daniel Nigro	Nigro	3:44
2.	"This Song"		Ethan Gruska	3:34
3.	"Vodka Cranberry"	Gray; Nigro	Nigro	4:06
4.	"Romeo"	Gray; Noah Conrad	Conrad; Nigro^{[a]}	3:32
5.	"My World"		Gruska	3:44
6.	"Class Clown"		Gruska	3:17
7.	"Nauseous"		Conrad	3:43
8.	"Caramel"	Gray; Nigro	Nigro; Jon Buscema^{[b]}	3:54
9.	"Connell"		Gruska	3:32
10.	"Sunset Tower"	Gray; Elvira Anderfjärd; Luka Kloser	Anderfjärd; Kloser	3:18
11.	"Eleven Eleven"		Conrad; Nigro^{[a]}	3:29
12.	"Care"	Gray; Nigro; Conrad	Conrad; Nigro	3:28
Total length:				43:21

Deluxe track listing
No.	Title	Writer(s)	Producer(s)	Length
13.	"Do I Dare"	Gray; Conrad	Conrad	3:43
14.	"House That Always Rains"	Gray; Conrad	Conrad	3:35
15.	"Door"	Gray; Buscema	Buscema	3:54
16.	"Moths"	Gray; Conrad; Annika Bennett	Conrad	3:04
17.	"The Best"	Gray; Buscema	Buscema	3:48
Total length:				60:25

=== Note ===
- ^{^[a]} signifies an additional producer
- ^{^[b]} signifies a co-producer
- Track lengths of "Eleven Eleven" and "Care" differ on the CD releases.

== Personnel ==
Credits adapted from Tidal.

=== Musicians ===
- Conan Gray – vocals (all tracks), background vocals (tracks 4, 5, 11, 12), whistle (4), acoustic guitar (7)
- Daniel Nigro – acoustic guitar (1, 3, 8, 11, 12); background vocals, electric guitar (1, 3, 8, 12); percussion (1, 3, 8), bass (1, 3, 11), string arrangement (1, 3), programming (1, 8, 11, 12), Mellotron (1), slide guitar (4), keyboards (11)
- Sterling Laws – drums (1, 3)
- Paul Cartwright – viola, violin (1); string arrangement (10), strings (12)
- Rob Moose – viola, violin (2, 3, 5, 6, 9), string arrangement (2, 5, 6, 9)
- Ethan Gruska – bass, guitar, percussion, programming (2, 5, 6, 9); keyboards (5, 6, 9), Marxophone (6, 11)
- Matt Chamberlain – drums (2, 5, 6, 9)
- Lily Elise – background vocals (3)
- Noah Conrad – acoustic guitar, percussion, programming (4, 7, 11, 12); drums (4, 7, 11); background vocals, banjo, trumpet (4); electric guitar, keyboards (7, 11, 12); bass (7, 12)
- Pera Krstajić – bass (4)
- Meg Duffy – electric guitar (5, 6)
- Jon Buscema – bass, drums, guitar (8)
- Alexander 23 – guitar (8)
- Kane Ritchotte – drums (9)
- Dylan Day – electric guitar (9)
- Gabe Noel – upright bass (9)
- Elvira Anderfjärd – bass, drums, keyboards, percussion, string arrangement, strings (10)
- Luka Kloser – bass, drums, guitar, keyboards, percussion, string arrangement (10)
- Adam Melchor – background vocals (11)
- Lily Aron – vocals, background vocals (12)
- Aksel Coe – drums (12)
- Tyler Baliey – drums (track 7–10, 12)

=== Technical ===
- Mitch McCarthy – mixing (1–3, 5–7, 9–12)
- Serban Ghenea – mixing (4)
- Mark "Spike" Stent – mixing (8)
- Daniel Nigro – engineering (1, 3, 4, 8, 11, 12)
- Chris Kasych – engineering (1, 8)
- Jon Buscema – engineering (1, 8)
- Ethan Gruska – engineering (2, 5, 6)
- Rachel White – engineering (2, 5, 6)
- Will Maclellan – engineering (2)
- Noah Conrad – engineering (4, 7, 11, 12)
- Elvira Anderfjärd – engineering (10)
- Luka Kloser – engineering (10)
- Aksel Coe – engineering (12)
- Rob Moose – string engineering (2, 3, 5, 9)
- Bryce Bordone – additional mixing (4)
- Zach Szydlo – immersive mixing

== Charts ==
Chart performance for Wishbone
Chart (2025–2026)	Peak position
Australian Albums (ARIA)	2
Austrian Albums (Ö3 Austria)	5
Belgian Albums (Ultratop Flanders)	4
Belgian Albums (Ultratop Wallonia)	8
Canadian Albums (Billboard)	35
Croatian International Albums (HDU)	34
Dutch Albums (Album Top 100)	4
Finnish Albums (Suomen virallinen lista)	42
French Albums (SNEP)	21
German Albums (Offizielle Top 100)	9
Irish Albums (Official Charts)	9
Italian Albums (FIMI)	97
Lithuanian Albums (AGATA)	70
New Zealand Albums (RMNZ)	8
Polish Albums (ZPAV)	4
Portuguese Albums (AFP)	19
Scottish Albums (Official Charts)	2
Spanish Albums (PROMUSICAE)	20
Swiss Albums (Schweizer Hitparade)	14
UK Albums (Official Charts)	2
US Billboard 200	3

== Certifications ==
Certifications for Wishbone
Region	Certification	Certified units/sales
United Kingdom (BPI)	Silver	60,000^{‡}
^{‡} Sales+streaming figures based on certification alone.

== Release history ==
Release dates and formats for Wishbone
Region	Date	Format	Label	Edition	Ref.
Various	August 15, 2025	CD; LP; digital download; streaming	Republic	Standard	
Various	April 24, 2026	Digital download; streaming	Republic	Deluxe	
Various	August 14, 2026	CD; LP	Republic	Deluxe	
