= Burns (musician) =

English musician (born 1985)

BURNS
- Also known as: Matt Burns
- Born: Matthew James Burns; 31 October 1985 (age 41); Stafford, Staffordshire, England
- Occupations: Musician; DJ; record producer; songwriter
- Years active: 2008–present
- Labels: RCA; Fly Eye; Deconstruction; Spinnin' Records
- Website: www.thisisburns.com

Matthew James Burns (born 31 October 1985), known mononymously as Burns (stylised in all caps), is an English DJ, record producer and songwriter. His recent writing and production credits include Lady Gaga, Ariana Grande, Ellie Goulding, Calvin Harris, Sam Smith, ASAP Rocky, Britney Spears, Teddy Swims, PartyNextDoor, Charli XCX, and others.

== Early life ==
Burns's mother was an artist and painter, and his father was a professional heavyweight boxer. Burns began making music at the age of twelve, playing guitar and keyboards before discovering sampling as a teenager. At the age of 15, Burns started producing his own tracks, combining sound hardware from the seventies and eighties with modern music software and samples.

== Musical career ==
BURNS was taken on by Three Six Zero for management, and subsequently joined Calvin Harris on his UK tour. He also released two EPs Turbo and Teknique on 2112 Records.

In 2010, BURNS released "Y.S.L.M (You Stopped Loving Me)" with French artist Fred Falke, also releasing his So Many Nights EP. In 2011, Burns released a track with NT89 entitled "Traffic" and went on to release "Iced Out" on Calvin Harris' Fly Eye label. In 2012, Burns secured a residency at The Wynn Hotel, Las Vegas while playing shows across America. He released "Lies" in September with remixes from Skream, Tiga, Acrobat and Otto Knows. The single entered the BBC Radio 1 playlist at C moving to B one week later and then on to A for 7 consecutive weeks. The track peaked at number 32 in the UK singles chart and at number 36 in the Netherlands.

BURNS began his solo residency at OMNIA nightclub in Las Vegas in 2016 as well as producing "Make Me" by Britney Spears. In 2017, BURNS was signed by RCA Records. His first release on the label, "Far Gone feat. Johnny Yukon" was released in summer of that year. He followed with a second single "Angel" in April 2018, and also "Hands on Me" which featured Maluma and Rae Sremmurd. "Hands on Me" was the first English-speaking feature for Latin artist Maluma. In May 2020, BURNS was credited 8 times as producer on Lady Gaga's album Chromatica.

== Discography ==
=== Compilation albums ===
- 2010 – This Is Burns 001 – European Sex Music – Part 1

=== Extended plays ===
Year	Title
2009	Turbo
2009	Disko
2009	Teknique
2010	Y.S.L.M (with Fred Falke)
2010	So Many Nights
2011	Traffic (with NT89)
2011	Midknight / Skeezer
2011	Iced Out
2011	Fred Falke Part IV
2021	Loving Touch

=== Singles ===
==== As lead artist ====
Year	Title	Peak chart positions				Certifications	Album
Year	Title	UK	BEL	NL	NZ Hot	Certifications	Album
2011	"Iced Out"	—	—	—	—		Non-album singles
2012	"Lies"	32	36	68	—		Non-album singles
2013	"Limitless"	—	134	—	—		Non-album singles
2014	"Emos"	—	—	—	—		Non-album singles
2014	"Flicka"	—	—	—	—		Non-album singles
2015	"About U" (with Tommy Trash)	—	—	—	—		Non-album singles
2015	"When I'm Around U"	—	—	—	—		Non-album singles
2016	"Near Me" (with R3hab)	—	—	—	—		Non-album singles
2016	"Make It Clap"	—	—	—	—		Non-album singles
2016	"Beauty Queen"	—	—	—	—		Non-album singles
2016	"Wave" (featuring Elvis Brown)	—	—	—	—		Non-album singles
2016	"Run Things"	—	—	—	—		Non-album singles
2017	"Far Gone" (featuring Johnny Yukon)	—	—	—	—		Non-album singles
2017	"Low to the Floor"	—	—	—	—		Non-album singles
2018	"Angel"	—	—	—	—		Non-album singles
2018	"Hands on Me" (featuring Maluma and Rae Sremmurd)	—	—	—	—		Non-album singles
2018	"Worst" (featuring Johnny Yukon)	—	—	—	—		Non-album singles
2019	"Energy" (with ASAP Rocky and Sabrina Claudio)	—	—	—	21		Non-album singles
2021	"Can't Let Go"	—	—	—	—		Non-album singles
2021	"Talamanca"	53	—	—	—	BPI: Silver	Non-album singles
2022	"Better" (with MK featuring Teddy Swims)	89	—	—	—		Non-album singles
2025	"Need U"	—	—	—	—		Non-album singles
"—" denotes single that did not chart or was not released.

==== As featured artist ====
Year	Title	Peak chart positions	Album
Year	Title	UK	Album
2011	"Off the Record" (Tinchy Stryder featuring Calvin Harris and Burns)	24	Non-album single

=== Remixes ===
Year	Artist(s)	Title
2008	Buy Now!	"Body Crash" (Burns Remix)
2008	Kaz James	"We Hold On" (Burns Mix)
2008	Wiley	"Wearing My Rolex" (Burns Remix)
2009	Calvin Harris	"I'm Not Alone" (Burns Rework)
2009	The Toxic Avenger	"Toxic Is Dead" (Burns Remix)
2009	Filthy Dukes	"Messages" (Burns Terradome Remix)
2009	Empire of the Sun	"We Are the People" (Burns Remix)
2009	Steve Angello and Sebastian Ingrosso	"Body Crash" (Burns Remix)
2009	Linus Loves	"Prom Night" (Burns Remix)
2009	Yuksek	"Extraball" (Burns Rmx)
2009	Melanie Fiona	"Give It to Me Right" (Burns Remix)
2009	Gossip	"Heavy Cross" (Burns Remix)
2009	Passion Pit	"The Reeling" (Burns Remix)
2009	Wolfmother	"White Feather" (Burns Remix)
2009	Frankmusik	"3 Little Words" (Burns Remix)
2009	Kasabian	"Where Did All the Love Go?" (Burns Remix)
2009	Jack Splash featuring Missy Elliott and Jazmine Sullivan	"I Could Have Loved You" (Burns Remix)
2009	The Toxic Avenger	"Toxic is Dead" (Burns Remix)
2010	The Aston Shuffle	"Your Love" (Burns Remix)
2010	Gossip	"Heavy Cross" (Burns Remix)
2010	Hurts	"Better Than Love" (European Sex Version)
2010	Kelis	"4th Of July" (Burns Remix)
2010	BURNS, Fred Falke	"Y.S.L.M." (You Stopped Loving Me) (Burns' European Sex Dub)
2010	Mr. Blink	"Gecko" (Burns' Start-Stop Remix)
2010	The Aston Shuffle	"Your Love" (Burns Remix)
2011	Nelly Furtado	"Night Is Young" (Dub Mix)
2011	Rye Rye featuring Robyn	"Never Will Be Mine" (Burns Remix)
2011	Yasmin	"On My Own" (Burns Remix)
2012	Marina and the Diamonds	"Primadonna" (SFCTR Remix)
2012	Calvin Harris featuring Florence Welch	"Sweet Nothing" (Burns Remix)
2012	Lana Del Rey	"National Anthem" (SFCTR Remix)
2012	Charli XCX	"You (Ha Ha Ha)" (Burns Violet Cloud Version)
2012	Adam F	"When The Rain Is Gone" (Burns Mix)
2012	Example	"Say Nothing" (Burns Remix)
2012	Passion Pit	"Take A Walk" (Burns' Sftcr Version)
2013	Iggy Azalea	"Work" (Burns Purple Rain Version)
2013	OneRepublic	"If I Lose Myself" (Burns Remix)
2013	Hurts	"Miracle" (Burns 50 Hz Version)
2013	Felix Cartal	"Young Love" ft Koko Laroo (Burns Remix)
2014	Calvin Harris featuring John Newman	"Blame" (Burns Remix)
2015	Bomba Estereo	"Fiesta" (BURNS Remix)
2015	Kaskade	"We Don't Stop" (BURNS Remix)
2016	Rihanna featuring Drake	"Work" (Burns' Late Night Rollin Remix)
2016	Bishop Briggs	"River" (Burns Remix)
2017	Miley Cyrus	"Younger Now" (BURNS Remix)
2018	Khalid, Ty Dolla $ign, 6LACK	"OTW" (Burns' Version)
2019	Burns, ASAP Rocky and Sabrina Claudio	"Energy" (Burns' Extra Energy Edit)
2019	Tove Lo	"Sweettalk My Heart" (BloodPop and Burns Vitaclub Remix)
2020	JP Saxe	"A Little Bit Yours (BURNS Remix)"

=== Productions ===
Year	Track	Artist(s)	Album
2010	"Intro"	Kelis	Flesh Tone
2012	"Amen"	Foreign Beggars	The Uprising
2013	"Midas Touch"	Ellie Goulding	Halcyon Days
2013	"All the Things" (with Calvin Harris featuring Inna)	Pitbull	Meltdown
2015	"Doing It" (featuring Rita Ora)	Charli XCX	Sucker
2015	"Ocean's Deep"	Noonie Bao	Noonia (EP)
2015	"Ninja"	Noonie Bao	Noonia (EP)
2016	"Reminds Me"	Noonie Bao	TBA
2016	"Make Me..." (featuring G-Eazy)	Britney Spears	Glory
2016	"Hit and Run"	Elliphant	Living Garden
2017	"Just Like You"	Louis Tomlinson	Non-album single
2017	"Dear Lover"	Little Mix	Glory Days (Platinum Edition)
2017	"Say You're Wrong"	Kacy Hill	Like A Woman
2018	"First Time" (featuring French Montana)	Liam Payne	First Time
2018	"Read Ur Mind"	L. Devine	Peer Pressure (EP)
2018	"First Night"	Johnny Yukon	Installation I
2018	"Healing"	Johnny Yukon	Installation I
2018	"I Like"	Johnny Yukon	Installation I
2018	"Lies"	Johnny Yukon	Installation I
2018	"Miscommunication"	Johnny Yukon	Installation I
2018	"All Out"	Johnny Yukon	Installation I
2018	"Voices"	Johnny Yukon	Installation I
2018	"Lonely"	Johnny Yukon	Installation I
2018	"Good Ones"	Johnny Yukon	Installation I
2019	"Hurt"	Gallant	Sweet Insomnia
2019	"What Am I Going To Do With You"	Sophia Messa	Single
2020	"Trauma"	PartyNextDoor	Partymobile
2020	"Always You"	Louis Tomlinson	Walls
2020	"Rain on Me" (with Ariana Grande)	Lady Gaga	Chromatica
2020	"Fun Tonight"	Lady Gaga	Chromatica
2020	"Sour Candy" (with Blackpink)	Lady Gaga	Chromatica
2020	"Enigma"	Lady Gaga	Chromatica
2020	"Replay"	Lady Gaga	Chromatica
2020	"Sine from Above" (with Elton John)	Lady Gaga	Chromatica
2020	"Babylon"	Lady Gaga	Chromatica
2020	"Over You"	Tiësto	The London Sessions
2020	"Cabin Fever"	Jaden Smith	CTV3: Cool Tape Vol. 3
2021	"Sacrifice"	Bebe Rexha	Better Mistakes
2021	"Satisfy Me"	Headie One	Too Loyal... For My Own Good
2021	"Can't Stop"	Johnny Yukon	Flight Plan 001
2021	"Don't Blame Me"	Johnny Yukon	Flight Plan 001
2021	"Can't Stay Away"	Darin	Single
2021	"Somebody"	Jack Swoon	Single
2022	"Boys Don't Cry"	Anitta	Versions of Me
2022	"Versions of Me"	Anitta	Versions of Me
2022	"Dancing's Done"	Ava Max	Diamonds & Dancefloors
2022	"The Start"	Johnny Yukon	The Start
2022	"Keys"	Johnny Yukon	The Start
2023	"One of Us"	Ava Max	Diamonds & Dancefloors
2023	"Call on Me"	Bebe Rexha	Bebe
2023	"One in a Million"	Bebe Rexha	Single
2023	"sever the blight"	Hemlocke Springs	Single
2023	"Enknee1"	Hemlocke Springs	Going...Going...Gone!
2023	"POS"	Hemlocke Springs	Going...Going...Gone!
2023	"Heavun"	Hemlocke Springs	Going...Going...Gone!
2023	"Girlfriend"	Hemlocke Springs	Going...Going...Gone!
2023	"Gimme All Ur Love"	Hemlocke Springs	Going...Going...Gone!
2023	"Desire"	Calvin Harris and Sam Smith	Single
2023	"Miracle"	Calvin Harris and Ellie Goulding	Single
2023	"I'm My Only Friend"	Dillon Francis	This Mixtape is Fire TOO
2023	"éxtasis"	Alaina Castillo	malos hábitos
2024	"Messy"	Rosé	Single
2024	"Back On That Horse"	Yung Gravy	Serving Country
2024	"America"	Lyra	Lyra
2025	"Rorschach Baby"	Ryn Weaver	Rorschach Baby
2026	"The Red Apple"	Hemlocke Springs	The Apple Tree Under The Sea
2026	"The Beginning of The End"	Hemlocke Springs	The Apple Tree Under The Sea
2026	"Head Shoulders, Knees and Ankles"	Hemlocke Springs	The Apple Tree Under The Sea
2026	"W-w-w-w-w"	Hemlocke Springs	The Apple Tree Under The Sea
2026	"Moses"	Hemlocke Springs	The Apple Tree Under The Sea
2026	"Sense (Is)	Hemlocke Springs	The Apple Tree Under The Sea
2026	"Set Me Free"	Hemlocke Springs	The Apple Tree Under The Sea
2026	"Be the Girl!"	Hemlocke Springs	The Apple Tree Under The Sea
