= Going...Going...Gone! =

EP by Hemlocke Springs
- Released: September 29, 2023
- Genre: Indie pop
- Length: 21:24
- Label: Good Luck Have Fun
- Producer: Hemlocke Springs; Icehunt; Burns; Jake Weinburg

Hemlocke Springs chronology
Going...Going...Gone! (2023)	The Apple Tree Under the Sea (2026)

Singles from Going...Going...Gone!
- 1. "Gimme All Ur Love" Released: May 24, 2022; 2. "Girlfriend" Released: November 2, 2022; 3. "Heavun" Released: June 12, 2023; 4. "Enknee1" Released: August 21, 2023; 5. "POS" Released: September 29, 2023

Going...Going...Gone! is the debut extended play by American singer and songwriter Hemlocke Springs, which was released by Good Luck Have Fun Records and distributed by AWAL on September 29, 2023. It featured seven original songs with frequent collaborator Burns served as the executive producer for the extended play.

== Composition ==
Dealing with emotions is not something that comes naturally for me. I actively try to avoid the act of processing. I feel like if I truly process everything that has occurred or is occurring, I will break down. And quite frankly I don’t have the time nor energy to do that. So, when I write songs, I think that is my sliver of "processing" peeking through. But even then, I put on a little "quirky" façade and sing a little upbeat, cause that’s just how I interpret things.

— Hemlocke Springs, described her creative process in her debut extended play to Nothing but Hope and Passion.

Udu released a TikTok post teasing "Gimme All Ur Love" as her debut single, and a creative director commented on Udu's TikTok posts if she could create a music video. They both agreed and released the music video in August 2022. Later on, three out of the seven songs from the extended play had accompanying music videos directed by Ana Peralta Chong.

== Promotion ==
=== Singles ===
Isimeme "Naomi" Udu self-produced and released her debut song "Gimme All Ur Love" on May 24, 2022, under the stage name Hemlocke Springs. An accompanying music video was published on YouTube on August 29, 2022, which surpassed 100 thousand views within days. Established celebrities, such as Grimes and Bella Hadid praised the song throughout social media.

The day before Halloween, Hemlocke Springs teased a second single while dressed as Dionne from Clueless (1995), which hit around a million views on TikTok. "Girlfriend" was released on November 2, 2022, and surpassed one million Spotify streams with people calling it the "awkward Black girl anthem". Heven Haile from Pitchfork described the song as "an ideal rom-com song" that "channels the bratty bravado of Family Jewels-era Marina and the springy falsetto of Kate Bush".

The singer collaborated with English producer Burns and released "Heavun" on June 12, 2023. In an interview with DIY, Hemlocke Springs explained the song "finds her portraying an avaricious protagonist that desires boundless wealth." She later released another single named "Enknee1" on August 21, 2023, she later announced her debut extended play. CT Jones and other contributors of Rolling Stone, ranked the song at number 98 for the "100 Best Songs of 2023". With the release of her extended play, a music video for "POS" premiered, where the short video showcased many personas of Hemlocke Springs' past music videos.

== Critical reception ==
Professional ratings
Review scores
Source	Rating
DIY	4/5 stars
Pitchfork	7.1/10

Reviewing the extended play for Pitchfork, Jaeden Pinter called it a "zany, '80s-inspired debut" with lyrics that make Udu "sound like a cursed Victorian ghost, doomed to live in heartbreak for all of eternity," also commenting that Udu "fleshes out her sound, highlighting a promising young artist in the age of internet virality". Emma Swann from DIY, described the extended play as "a charming showcase of cut-and-paste pop that has seemingly taken cues from anywhere and everywhere."

Jalyn Chiclana of The Ticker reminded the extended play from Kero Kero Bonito's second studio album, Time 'n' Place (2018). She also describes the lyrics as "catchy and relatable, especially towards romantics."

== Track listing ==
All tracks are written by Isimeme Udu, except where noted.

Going...Going...Gone! – Standard edition
No.	Title	Producer(s)	Length
1.	"Gimme All Ur Luv"	Isimeme Udu	2:53
2.	"Girlfriend"	Udu	2:13
3.	"Heavun"	Udu; Icehunt	3:12
4.	"Enknee1"	Udu; Burns	3:44
5.	"POS"	Udu; Burns	3:06
6.	"The Train to Nowhere"	Udu	3:39
7.	"Going...Going...Gone!"	Udu; Jake Weinberg	2:38
Total length:			21:24

== Release history ==
Release dates and formats for Going...Going...Gone!
Region	Date	Format(s)	Label	Ref.
Various	September 29, 2023	Digital download; streaming	Good Luck Have Fun	
Various	December 22, 2023	Cassette; vinyl	Good Luck Have Fun	
