= The Apple Tree Under the Sea =

Studio album by Hemlocke Springs
- Released: February 13, 2026
- Recorded: 2023–2025
- Genres: Synth-pop; alternative pop; electropop; bedroom pop
- Length: 33:24
- Label: AWAL
- Producers: Burns; Hemlocke Springs

Hemlocke Springs chronology
Going...Going...Gone! (2023)	The Apple Tree Under the Sea (2026)

Singles from The Apple Tree Under the Sea
- 1. "Sever the Blight" Released: May 3, 2023; 2. "The Beginning of the End" Released: September 4, 2025; 3. "Head, Shoulders, Knees and Ankles" Released: October 22, 2025; 4. "W-W-W-W-W" Released: January 15, 2026; 5. "Be the Girl!" Released: February 13, 2026

The Apple Tree Under the Sea (stylized in lowercase) is the debut studio album by American singer and songwriter Hemlocke Springs, released independently on February 13, 2026.

== Critical reception ==
Professional ratings
Aggregate scores
Source	Rating
AnyDecentMusic?	7.8/10
Metacritic	81/100
Review scores
Source	Rating
AllMusic	3.5/5 stars
Clash	9/10
DIY	4/5 stars
The Guardian	4/5 stars
The Line of Best Fit	8/10
Musikexpress	5.5/6 stars
NME	4/5 stars
Paste	C+
The Skinny	5/5 stars

According to the review aggregator Metacritic, The Apple Tree Under the Sea received "universal acclaim" based on a weighted average score of 81 out of 100 from 9 critic scores.

== Track listing ==
All tracks are written by Isimeme Naomi Udu and Matthew James Burns, except "Sense Is" (Prelude), written solely by Udu.

No.	Title	Length
1.	"The Red Apple"	1:41
2.	"The Beginning of the End"	2:52
3.	"Head, Shoulders, Knees and Ankles"	3:13
4.	"W-w-w-w-w"	4:27
5.	"Moses"	3:46
6.	"Sever the Blight"	2:49
7.	"Sense Is" (Prelude)	1:29
8.	"Sense (Is)"	4:18
9.	"Set Me Free"	3:15
10.	"Be the Girl!"	5:34
Total length:		33:24

=== Note ===
- All tracks are stylized in lower case.

== Personnel ==
Credits adapted from Tidal.

- Isimeme Naomi Udu – lead vocals, production (all tracks); synthesizer (tracks 1, 3, 5, 7, 8), bass guitar (2, 10)
- Burns – production, engineering, vocal arrangement (all tracks); synthesizer (1, 3, 8, 9), electric guitar (2), strings (6), bass guitar (10)
- Mitch McCarthy – mixing
- Nathan Dantzler – mastering
- Harrison Tate – mastering assistance
- Pvris – electric guitar (2)
- Leah Zegar – violin (5, 6, 8)
- Nana Adjoa – electric guitar (8)
