= Esha Tewari =

Australian 21st-century singer-songwriter

- Born: April 6, 2006 (age 20)
- Genres: Indie pop; indie folk
- Occupations: Singer-songwriter, producer
- Years active: 2024–present
- Labels: Warner Music/Atlantic (2024-2025); Alta Music Group (2025– )
- Website: eshatewari.com

Esha Tewari is an Australian singer-songwriter. She released the EPs I Can, Better Off, Wraith, and What Makes A Girl a Girl. She was the opening act on Conan Gray's Wishbone World tour.

== Early life ==
Tewari was born to a mother of Indian and Nepalese descent, from Gangtok, Sikkim, and a white father. She started playing violin at the age of 4, then picked up piano and taught herself guitar by year 7. She started doing musical theater in year 10. Tewari began writing songs in her bedroom at 17 and sharing songs on social media.

== Career ==
Tewari released her debut single "With Ease" in February 2024. She followed up with the release of the single "Beautiful Boy". She released on her debut EP, I Can, in 2024. Her second EP, Better Off, was released in August 2024, and she performed at SXSW Sydney in October 2024. Tewari headlined her first national tour in 2024.

In January 2025, Tewari signed with Warner Music in collaboration with Atlantic Records. She completed a sold-out Australian tour in the spring of 2025, followed by a North American tour in the same year. Tewari released her third EP, Wraith, in May 2025. Tewari released the single "In Twos" in November 2025, followed by her fourth EP, What Makes A Girl, in December 2025.

A deluxe edition of What Makes A Girl was released in February 2026, titled What Makes A Girl A Girl, it featured two extra songs, "Cars and Gasoline" and "Where Our Streets Meet". She opened for Conan Gray's 2026 "Wishbone World Tour", which played in North America, Europe, Australia, and New Zealand.

== Musical style ==
Tewari's music style has been described as indie folk and indie pop. She is a fan of singer Jeff Buckley.

== Discography ==
=== Extended plays ===
Title	Details	Notes
I Can	Released: 9 April 2024; Label: Independent; Format: Digital download, streaming, vinyl	
Better Off	Released: 25 August 2024; Label: Independent; Format: Digital download, streaming, CD	
Wraith	Released: 1 May 2025; Label: Warner, Atlantic; Format: Digital download, streaming, CD	
What Makes a Girl	Released: 5 December 2025; Label: Alta Music Group; Format: Digital download, streaming, CD, vinyl, cassette	

== Awards and nominations ==
=== NSW Music Prize ===
The NSW Music Prize aims to "celebrate, support and incentivise" the NSW's most talented artists, with "the aim of inspiring the next generations of stars". It commenced in 2025.

Year	Nominee / work	Award	Result	Ref.
2026	What Makes a Girl a Girl	NSW Music Prize	Nominated	
2026	Esha Tewari	NSW Breakthrough Artist of the Year	Nominated	
