= Lies (Burns song) =

Single by Burns
- Released: 20 July 2012
- Recorded: 2012
- Genre: Dance
- Length: 3:19
- Label: Sony
- Songwriters: Keir Gist, Alonzo Jackson, Taura Stinson, Laura Welsh, Matthew Burns, De'Andre Griffin

Burns singles chronology
| "Off the Record" (2011) | "Lies" (2012) | "Limitless" (2013) |

"Lies" is a song performed by British DJ and producer Burns, released in the United Kingdom on 20 July 2012 as a digital download on iTunes. The song was written by Keir Gist, Alonzo Jackson, Taura Stinson, Laura Welsh, Matthew Burns and De'Andre Griffin. The song peaked at number 32 on the UK Singles Chart. This song uses a vocal sample of Deborah Cox's "It's Over Now".

== Music video ==
A music video to accompany the release of "Lies" was first uploaded to Burns' Vevo account on 20 July 2012 at a total length of three minutes and twenty-four seconds. A second video, for the Otto Knows remix, was uploaded to his Vevo account on 26 November 2012.

== Critical reception ==
Lucy Jones from NME gave the song a positive review, writing, "'Lies' casts Burns – a man previously known for being a bit like Calvin Harris – as a massive bangermonger in his own right. A catchy, pained vocal is pinned on a popping dancehall beat before a hands-in-the-air chorus with synths. Dancefloors will go bananas. Even Mr Burns would do the Macarena if he heard it."

== Track listing ==
Digital download
| No. | Title | Length |
|---|---|---|
| 1. | "Lies" (Radio Edit) | 3:19 |
| 2. | "Lies" (Tiga Remix) | 5:47 |
| 3. | "Lies" (Skream Remix) | 4:36 |
| 4. | "Lies" (Otto Knows Remix) | 6:19 |
| 5. | "Lies" (Acrobat Remix) | 5:58 |
| 6. | "Lies" (Extended Mix) | 4:34 |

== Charts ==
| Chart (2012–2013) | Peak position |
|---|---|
| Belgium (Ultratop 50 Flanders) | 36 |
| Belgium (Ultratip Bubbling Under Wallonia) | 9 |
| Hungary (Rádiós Top 40) | 32 |
| Netherlands (Single Top 100) | 68 |
| Scotland (OCC) | 22 |
| UK Singles (OCC) | 32 |
| UK Dance (OCC) | 6 |

== Certifications ==
| Region | Certification | Certified units/sales |
|---|---|---|
| Sweden (GLF) | Gold | 20,000^{‡} |
^{‡} Sales+streaming figures based on certification alone.

== Release history ==
| Region | Date | Format | Label |
|---|---|---|---|
| United Kingdom | 14 September 2012 | Digital download | Sony |
