= Bülow (singer) =

Canadian singer

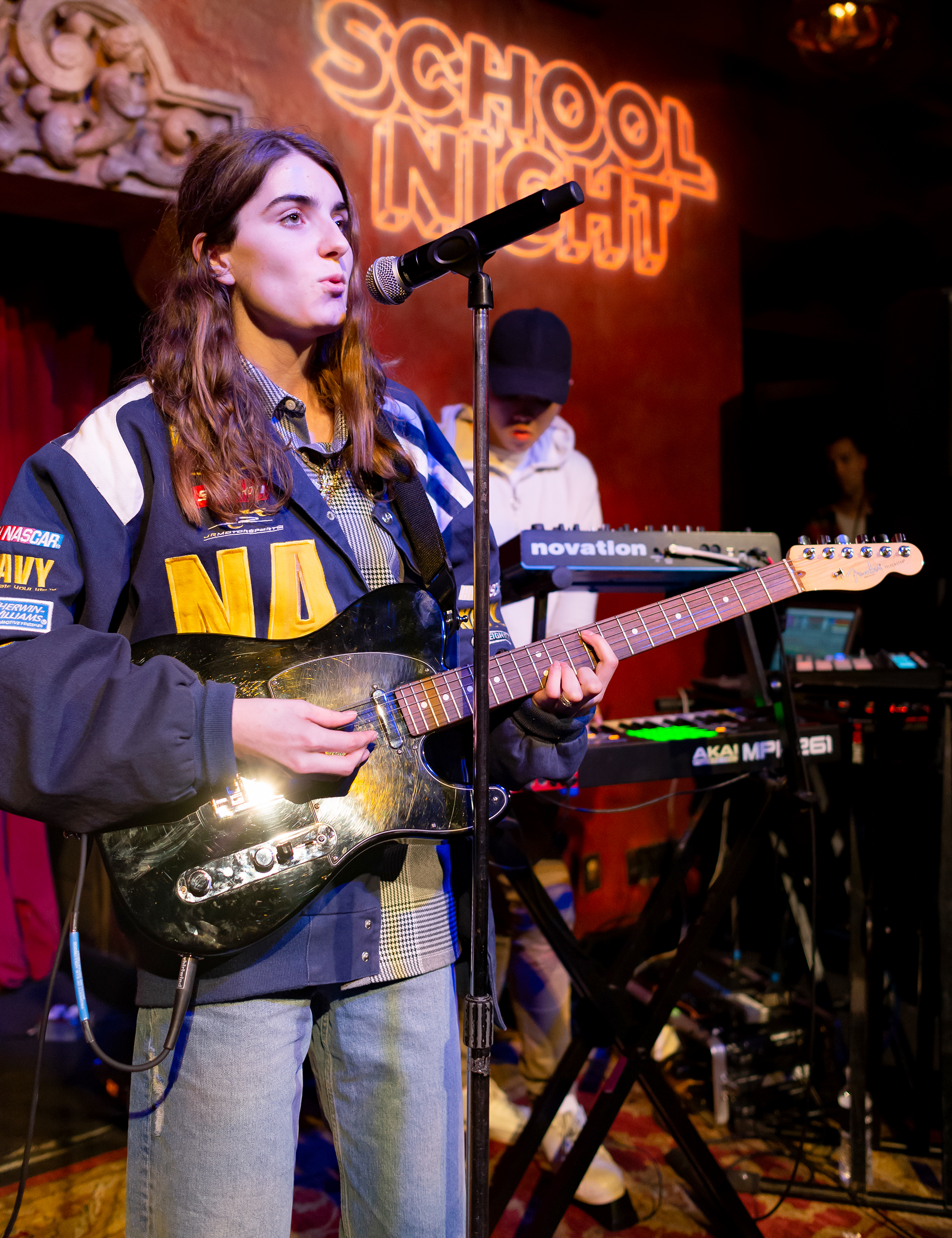
- Bülow performing in 2018

Background information
- Born: Megan Bülow; December 25, 1999 (age 26); Berlin, Germany
- Origin: Durham, Ontario, Canada
- Genres: Pop
- Instrument: Vocals
- Years active: 2017–present
- Labels: Universal Music Canada; Republic; Wax Records
- Website: https://www.bulowmusic.com

Megan Bülow (German pronunciation: [ˈmeːɡan ˈbyːloː]; born December 25, 1999), known professionally as Bülow (stylized in all lowercase), is a German-Canadian pop singer who had success with her debut EP Damaged Vol. 1. She also co-wrote Beyoncé's Billboard Hot 100 number-one single "Texas Hold 'Em", which earned her two nominations at the Grammy Awards, including Song of the Year.

== Early life ==
Bülow was born in 1999 in Berlin, Germany. She grew up and lived in the United Kingdom, Canada, the United States, and the Netherlands. After being discovered at a summer camp in 2016, when she was 16, Bülow began collaborating with a number of Canadian writers and producers. Bülow currently resides in the Netherlands, where she completed high school at the American School of the Hague.

== Damaged Vol. 1 ==
In November 2017, Bülow released the debut EP Damaged Vol. 1, garnering her the title of "New Artist of the Week" by Apple Music Canada. The EP featured three tracks, with the track "Not a Love Song" released as a single first. In a statement to Noisey, Bülow described her inspiration for the track as "the excitement of meeting someone for the first time" and eventually realizing that she "just wasn't ready for that commitment yet." The rest of her EP also consists of "smart, poignant tracks about guys".

Damaged Vol. 1 was praised by critics for its "real and authentic" portrayal of bülow's voice and use of dynamic percussion elements. "Not a Love Song" was also praised for its "bouncy" and "synth-saturated" style.

== Tours ==
On 9 April 2019, Bülow announced on Instagram that she would be touring with Lauv in the fall, visiting India and the American cities of Washington, D.C., Philadelphia, Boston, New York City, Chicago, Oakland, and Los Angeles. On 9 February 2020, Conan Gray announced that she would be supporting him on the European leg of his Kid Krow World Tour, starting on 26 April 2020. The tour was however cancelled due to the COVID-19 pandemic, so in October 2021, Gray announced that Bülow would instead be joining him on the North American leg of his 2022 World Tour.

== Awards and achievements ==
=== Grammy Awards ===
Year	Nominee / work	Award	Result
2025	"Texas Hold 'Em"	Song of the Year	Nominated
2025	"Texas Hold 'Em"	Best Country Song	Nominated

=== Juno Awards ===
Year	Nominee / work	Award	Result
2019	Bülow	Breakthrough Artist of the Year	Won
2019	Bülow	Fan Choice Award	Nominated
2019	Damaged Vol. 1	Pop Album of the Year	Nominated
2019	"Not a Love Song"	Single of the Year	Nominated

== Discography ==
=== Albums ===
Title	Details
I Understand You Sometimes	Released: June 26, 2026; Label: Self-released; Format: Streaming, digital download; Track listing: 1. "Wind Down"; 2. "Hide & Seek"; 3. "Wish Upon A Sun"; 4. "Goldmine"; 5. "Destroy"; 6. "Figurine"; 7. "Party Dress"; 8. "I Understand You Sometimes"; 9. "Midnight Black"; 10. "Counting Candles"

=== Extended plays ===
Title	Details
Damaged Vol. 1	Released: November 3, 2017; Label: Wax; Format: Streaming, digital download; Track listing: 1. "Like This Guy"; 2. "Not a Love Song"; 3. "Lines"
Damaged Vol. 2	Released: June 8, 2018; Label: Wax, Universal Music Canada, Republic; Format: Streaming, digital download; Track listing: 1. "Sad and Bored" (featuring Duckwrth); 2. "Honor Roll"; 3. "You & Jennifer"
Crystalline	Released: April 5, 2019; Label: Wax, Universal Music Canada, Republic; Format: Streaming, digital download; Track listing: 1. "Sweet Little Lies"; 2. "Get Stüpid"; 3. "Word Smith"; 4. "Back Off — Interlude"; 5. "Fine"; 6. "Euphoria"; 7. "Wake Up"
The Contender	Released: October 4, 2019; Label: Wax, Universal Music Canada, Republic; Format: Streaming, digital download; Track listing: 1. "Own Me"; 2. "Boys Will Be Boys"; 3. "Puppy Love" (featuring Jimi Somewhere); 4. "Upside Down"; 5. "Sundress"
Booty Call	Released: April 14, 2022; Label: Universal Music Canada, Republic; Format: Streaming, digital download; Track listing: 1. "Don't Break His Heart"; 2. "Playin' Me Back"; 3. "Booty Call"; 4. "Mona's Dad"; 5. "My Mercedes"

=== Singles ===
==== As lead artist ====
Title	Year	Peak chart positions	Certifications	Album/EP
Title	Year	CAN	Certifications	Album/EP
"Like This Guy"	2017	—		Damaged Vol. 1
"Not a Love Song"	2017	32	MC: 2× Platinum	Damaged Vol. 1
"Lines"	2017	—		Damaged Vol. 1
"Sad and Bored" (featuring Duckwrth)	2018	—		Damaged Vol. 2
"Honor Roll"	2018	—		Damaged Vol. 2
"You & Jennifer"	2018	—	MC: Gold	Damaged Vol. 2
"Two Punks in Love"	2018	57	MC: Platinum	Non-album single
"Sweet Little Lies"	2019	58	MC: Platinum	Crystalline
"Get Stüpid"	2019	—	MC: Gold	Crystalline
"Boys Will Be Boys"	2019	—		The Contender
"Own Me"	2019	—		The Contender
"You & Jennifer (The Other Side)" (with Rich the Kid)	2019	—		Non-album singles
"I Don't Wanna Be" (with Blvth)	2020	—		Non-album singles
"Lost"	2020	—		Non-album singles
"First Place"	2021	—		Non-album singles
"Revolver"	2021	—		Non-album singles
"Don't Break His Heart"	2022	—		Booty Call
"Playin' Me Back"	2022	—		Booty Call
"Something in the Way"	2022	—		Non-album single
"—" denotes singles that did not chart or were not released

==== As featured artist ====
Title	Year	Album
"Farewell to Nova Scotia" (Blitz//Berlin featuring Bülow)	2017	Movements II
"The Last of the Real Ones" (Remix) (Fall Out Boy featuring MadeinTYO and Bülow)	2018	Mania
"Do You Mean" (The Chainsmokers featuring Ty Dolla $ign and Bülow)	2019	World War Joy
"So Good" (Whethan featuring Bülow)	2020	Fantasy
"She Abunai" (Alice Longyu Gao featuring Mura Masa and Bülow)	2021	Non-album singles
"Lost" (Skaya featuring Bülow)	2024	Non-album singles
