= Vodka Cranberry (song) =

2025 single by Conan Gray

Single by Conan Gray

from the album Wishbone
- B-side: "Eleven Eleven"; "Moths"
- Released: July 11, 2025
- Length: 4:05
- Label: Republic
- Songwriters: Conan Gray; Dan Nigro
- Producer: Dan Nigro

Conan Gray singles chronology
"This Song" (2025)	"Vodka Cranberry" (2025)	"Caramel" (2025)

Music video
- "Vodka Cranberry" on YouTube

"Vodka Cranberry" is a song by American singer-songwriter Conan Gray. It was released through Republic Records on July 11, 2025, as the second single from his fourth studio album, Wishbone. Written by Gray and Dan Nigro, the latter of whom also produced the track, the song explores the disorienting emotions associated with an extended breakup and subsequent reunions with an ex. The accompanying music video is the second chapter of a story that began in previous single "This Song" and concludes with the following single "Caramel" starring Gray and Corey Fogelmanis.

== Background ==
In a track-by-track breakdown of the album with Capital, Gray stated of "Vodka Cranberry": "It's one of those songs where I think it's more indicative of my irrational fear of people leaving me. I think I was so afraid of what was going on, so confused, that there was always this instinct of me of like, 'Oh I should just cut it off so that I'm the one who gets to have a say in whether I'm being dumped or not'."

== Live performances ==
Gray's debut live performance of "Vodka Cranberry" ahead of its official release took place at the Open'er Festival in Poland on July 5, 2025. The following month, he performed the song on The Today Show on August 15 alongside four other Wishbone tracks and "Heather" from his debut album, Kid Krow. On September 7, Gray closed the 2025 VMAs with a performance of the song.

"Vodka Cranberry" featured on the setlist for his sixth and seventh concert tours, The Wishbone Pajama Show and the Wishbone World Tour.

== Music video ==
The video for "Vodka Cranberry" was released alongside the song itself on July 11, 2025. It was directed by Danica Kleinknecht, who shot it on Kodak 35 film in Gray's home state of Texas. As with the other music videos from Wishbone, the video explores the relationship between two boys, Wilson (Gray) and Brando (Corey Fogelmanis). Following on from "This Song", which depicts the beginning of Wilson and Brando's love story, Vodka Cranberry opens with Wilson contemplating whether his feelings for Brando may no longer be reciprocated, which is then reflected during the rest of the video featuring the pair on an end of summer road trip. The video ends with Wilson waking up alone in a motel to find that Brando has seemingly driven off and left him.

== Charts ==
Chart performance for "Vodka Cranberry"
Chart (2025)	Peak position
Estonia Airplay (TopHit)	74
Ireland (IRMA)	93
New Zealand Hot Singles (RMNZ)	17
UK Singles (Official Charts)	93
US Bubbling Under Hot 100 (Billboard)	11
US Pop Airplay (Billboard)	19

== Release history ==
Release history for "Vodka Cranberry"
Region	Date	Format(s)	Label(s)	Ref.
United States	July 15, 2025	Contemporary hit radio	Republic	
