= Limitless (Burns song) =

Single by Burns
- Released: 10 May 2013
- Recorded: 2012
- Length: 3:45
- Label: Sony
- Songwriter(s): Clare Maguire, Burns

Burns singles chronology
"Lies" (2012)	"Limitless" (2013)

Clare Maguire singles chronology
"Limitless" (2013)

"Limitless" is a song performed by British record producer Burns, released in the United Kingdom on 10 May 2013, as a digital download on iTunes. The song features English singer Clare Maguire and was written by Maguire and Burns.

== Track listing ==
Digital download
No.	Title	Length
1.	"Limitless" (Radio Mix)	3:45
2.	"Limitless" (Arno Cost Remix)	5:42
3.	"Limitless" (Jacob Plant Remix)	3:19
4.	"Limitless" (Henrix Remix)	6:04
5.	"Limitless" (Gunther Beatz Remix)	3:53

== Charts ==
Chart (2013)	Peak position
Belgium (Ultratip Bubbling Under Flanders)	84

== Release history ==
Region	Date	Format	Label
United Kingdom	10 May 2013	Digital download	Sony Music Entertainment
