= Hemlocke Springs =

American singer (born 1998)

- Hemlocke Springs in July 2026
- Born: Isimeme Udu; November 16, 1998 (age 27); Raleigh, North Carolina, U.S.
- Education: Spelman College (BS); Dartmouth College (MS)
- Occupations: Singer; songwriter; record producer
- Years active: 2022–present
- Musical career
- Origin: Concord, North Carolina, U.S.
- Genres: Alternative pop; bedroom pop; indie pop; synth-pop
- Instrument: Vocals
- Website: hemlockesprings.net

Isimeme "Naomi" Udu (born November 16, 1998), known professionally as Hemlocke Springs (stylized in all lowercase), is an American singer, songwriter, and record producer. She first gained prominence for her second self-produced song "Girlfriend" achieving viral popularity on video-sharing platform TikTok. The majority of her discography is characterized by 1980s synth-pop and 2000s pop sounds.

During her postgraduate medical studies at Dartmouth College in 2021, Udu began to upload unnamed songs on SoundCloud, only to quickly remove them. Hemlocke Springs's first official single "Gimme All Ur Luv" (categorized as bedroom pop) was subsequently self-released in 2022. She later released her debut extended play, Going...Going...Gone!, in 2023. Her debut album, The Apple Tree Under the Sea, was released on February 13, 2026.

== Early life and education ==
Isimeme Udu was born to two Nigerian immigrant parents on November 16, 1998, in Raleigh, North Carolina. Nicknamed as "Naomi" from her parents, she grew up in Concord alongside her brother, a musician and SoundCloud producer. In her sophomore year of high school, Udu took a choir course and met a freshman classmate, MJ, who taught her to create music using GarageBand.

Udu graduated from Spelman College with a bachelor's degree in biology in 2021. Two years later, she graduated with a master's degree in medical informatics from Dartmouth College.

== Music career ==
=== 2021–2023: Career beginnings with "Girlfriend" ===
While studying at Dartmouth College in 2021, Udu began to release various unnamed songs on SoundCloud, only to quickly remove them. The next year, she decided to shed her embarrassment and uploaded a demo titled "Jacob" under the name Hemlocke Springs. Afterwards, she independently released her self-produced song "Gimme All Ur Luv" on May 24, 2022. It gained over a million streams through Swedish streaming service Spotify and was considered one of "the best bedroom pop [songs]" by entertainment company Complex Networks. In an interview with magazine Rolling Stone, she said the song was written during a period of depression at school; she considered deleting it but changed her mind when she saw Canadian musician Grimes had commented.

As she worked at the library at her university, Hemlocke Springs shared snippets of her second song on video-sharing platform TikTok, which achieved viral popularity. Shortly afterward, "Girlfriend" was released on November 2. The song was positively received by critics and audiences, deemed an "awkward Black girl anthem" and surpassing a million streams on Spotify. In an interview with People, Udu stated that she felt honored by the song's success, but was confused by her sudden rise to fame.

New Musical Express later named her as one of the "essential emerging artists" for recognizing her "bright and breezy bangers" on January 6, 2023. The same month, Hemlocke Springs released her third song, "Stranger Danger!", a critique of capitalism. During May to August 2023, she began working with English record producer Burns and released three more songs. Her first festival performance occurred on July 21 at the Adult Swim Festival for the annual entertainment event San Diego Comic-Con (SDCC). "Enknee1" was released a month later with the artist announcing her debut extended play (EP) named Going...Going...Gone!, released on September 29, 2023. A month later, Pitchfork praised and described Hemlocke Springs' music aesthetics as "kitschy and yearning", where every song of the EP "can be imagined in a different scene" from a 1980s romantic comedy film.

Hemlocke Springs began touring across North America and Europe and was invited to be an opening act for American band Muna's Life's So Fun Tour and rapper Ashnikko's Weedkiller Tour. She was later featured in a magazine double issue with other notable artists, published through DIY on December 11, 2023.

=== 2024–present: Opening acts and The Apple Tree Under the Sea ===
Hemlocke Springs performed as the opening act for the European leg of rapper Doja Cat's second concert tour, The Scarlet Tour. Before performing on tour, she released a cover of Doja Cat song "Agora Hills". After a short hiatus from music, Dreamshop Management announced that they had signed Hemlocke Springs on October 23, 2024 with publishing firm OTM Music adding her to their roster on December 4, 2024.

Hemlocke Springs returned to publishing music with the single "The Beginning of the End", released on September 4, 2025. Exclaim! noted that she approached the song differently, taking a more "sober" tone than her previous "bubblegum aesthetics". The same month, the Hopkins Center for the Arts at Dartmouth College was reopened, where various alumni alongside Hemlocke Springs held workshops and performances for students. Also in 2025, she performed as an opening act for the Visions of Damsels & Other Dangerous Things Tour led by singer Chappell Roan, as well as for Conan Gray's Wishbone Pajama Show tour.

She released her debut album, The Apple Tree Under the Sea, on February 13, 2026.

== Artistry ==
Udu's style draws distinctly from lo-fi music and indie pop. "Girlfriend", her most-streamed song as of September 2026, has been described by reviewer Heven Haile of Pitchfork as "an ideal rom-com song" that "channels the bratty bravado of Family Jewels-era Marina and the springy falsetto of Kate Bush".

=== Inspiration ===
In her middle school years, Springs was influenced by many EDM artists, primarily Swedish artist Avicii and his 2011 song "Levels". Udu has also drawn inspiration from many K-pop artists and groups.

In an interview with Alternative Press, she claimed she came up with her stage name using a random name generator, and added the letter "e" to the end of "Hemlock" in honor of New Zealand singer Lorde.

== Discography ==
=== Studio albums ===
List of studio albums, with selected details
Title	Details
The Apple Tree Under the Sea	Released: February 13, 2026; Label: Self-released; Format: Compact disc, digital download, streaming, vinyl

=== Extended plays ===
List of extended plays, with selected details
Title	Details
Going...Going...Gone!	Released: September 29, 2023; Label: Self-released; Format: Cassette, digital download, streaming, vinyl

=== Singles ===
==== As lead artist ====
List of singles, with selected chart positions, showing year released, and album name
Title	Year	Peak chart positions	Album
Title	Year	NZ Hot	Album
"Gimme All Ur Luv"	2022	—	Going...Going...Gone!
"Girlfriend"	2022	22	Going...Going...Gone!
"Stranger Danger!"	2023	—	Non-album single
"Sever the Blight"	2023	—	The Apple Tree Under the Sea
"Heavun"	2023	—	Going...Going...Gone!
"Enknee1"	2023	—	Going...Going...Gone!
"POS"	2023	—	Going...Going...Gone!
"Christmas Time Is Here"	2023	—	Non-album single
"The Beginning of the End"	2025	—	The Apple Tree Under the Sea
"Head, Shoulders, Knees and Ankles"	2025	—	The Apple Tree Under the Sea
"W-w-w-w-w"	2026	—	The Apple Tree Under the Sea
"gloria!"	2026	—	Non-album single
"—" denotes a recording that failed to chart, was ineligible for the chart or was not released.

==== As featured artist ====
Year	Title	Album	Writer(s)	Producer(s)
2026	"Switch It On and Off" (Yo Gabba Gabba & Hemlocke Springs)	Yo Gabba GabbaLand! (Season 2 - AppleTV+ Original Series Soundtrack)	Matthew James Gorney	Hemlocke Springs

=== Music videos ===
List of music videos, showing year released, and director(s)
Title	Year	Album	Director(s)	Ref.
"Gimme All Ur Luv"	2022	Going...Going...Gone!	Ana Peralta Chong	
"Girlfriend"	2022	Going...Going...Gone!	Ana Peralta Chong	
"Stranger Danger!"	2023	Non-album single	Ana Peralta Chong	
"Sever the Blight"	2023	The Apple Tree Under the Sea	Ana Peralta Chong	
"POS"	2023	Going...Going...Gone!	Ana Peralta Chong	
"The Beginning of the End"	2025	The Apple Tree Under the Sea	Quinn Whitney Wilson	
"Be the Girl!"	2026	The Apple Tree Under the Sea	Quinn Whitney Wilson	
"gloria!"	2026	Non-album single	Jackie! Zhou	

== Tours ==
=== Headlining ===
- The Apple Tree Under The Sea Tour (2026)

=== Supporting ===
- Muna – Life's So Fun Tour (2023)
- Ashnikko – Weedkiller Tour (2023)
- Doja Cat – The Scarlet Tour (2024)
- Conan Gray – The Wishbone Pajama Show (2025)
- Chappell Roan – Visions of Damsels & Other Dangerous Things Tour (2025)
- Muna - It Gets So Hot Tour (2026)

== Filmography ==
=== Podcasts ===
List of podcast credits, with selected details
Year	Title	Role	Notes	Ref.
Superbloom Radio	2022	Guest		
The Zane Lowe Show	2023	Guest	Episode 518	
The Zane Lowe Show	2023	Guest	Episode 603	
The Travis Mills Show	2023	Guest	Episode 491	

== Accolades ==
=== Listicles ===
Name of the publisher, year listed, name of listicle, and placement result
Publisher	Year (Note: Indicates the year listed. Each year is linked to the article about the listicle held that year, wherever possible.)	Listicle	Recipient(s) and nominee(s)	Result	Ref.
New Musical Express	2023	Essential New Artists	Herself	Included	
Rolling Stone	2023	100 Best Songs of 2023	"Enknee1"	98th	

== See also ==
- List of Dartmouth College alumni
- List of people from North Carolina
- List of Spelman College people
