= Bitterzoet =

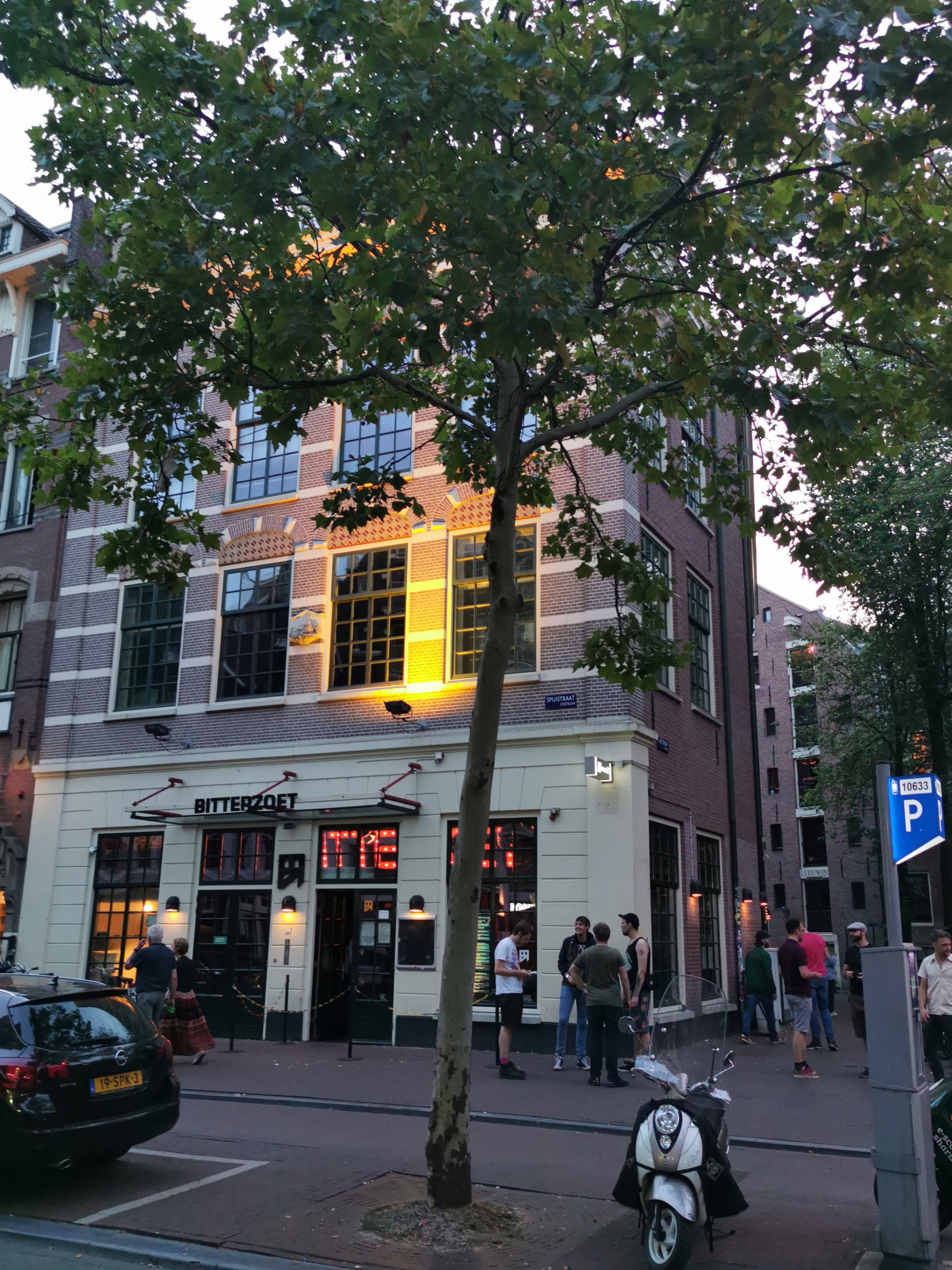

General information
- Status: music venue
- Address: Spuistraat 2
- Town or city: Amsterdam
- Country: Netherlands
- Opened: 2003

Bitterzoet is a nightclub and music venue in Amsterdam. It is located on Spuistraat and was opened in 2003.

== History ==
Bitterzoet was started in 2003 by Pieter de Kroon, Joris Bakker, and Nica de Bloeme. The club quickly became successful and was particularly well-known in hip-hop circles.

In 2008, the club was sold to new owners Bas Louwers and Sjoerd Idema, although they continued with the same name and programming. 3voor12 subsequently wrote in an article about Bitterzoet: "In five years, Bitterzoet has grown into an important club, with innovative programming in the field of both hip-hop and alternative music." In 2018, Bitterzoet celebrated its fifteenth anniversary. Since 2020, Bas Louwers has been the sole owner.

== Events ==
Bitterzoet offers concerts in various genres such as rock, punk, hip-hop, funk, ska and soul and provides space for emerging artists, bands and DJs. The main hall has a capacity of 350 people. Paradiso regularly programs concerts in Bitterzoet. In addition to concerts and club nights, there are sometimes other activities in Bitterzoet, such as album release parties, and, in the past, recordings for De beste singer-songwriter van Nederland.
