= A Little Bit Yours =

Single by JP Saxe

from the album Dangerous Levels of Introspection
- Released: September 2, 2020
- Genre: Pop
- Length: 3:45
- Label: Arista
- Songwriters: Jonathan Percy Saxe; Ryan Marrone; Benjamin Rice
- Producers: Ryan Marrone; Benjamin Rice

JP Saxe singles chronology
"Hey Stupid, I Love You" (2020)	"A Little Bit Yours" (2020)	"Kissin' in the Cold" (2020)

"A Little Bit Yours" is a song recorded by Canadian singer-songwriter JP Saxe for his debut studio album, Dangerous Levels of Introspection (2021). Saxe co-wrote the song with its producers, Ryan Marrone and Benjamin Rice. It was released September 2, 2020 and serves as the lead single off the album. The song explores the difficulty of moving on after a breakup.

== Composition ==
"A Little Bit Yours" is a piano-driven pop ballad written by JP Saxe, Ryan Marrone, and Benjamin Rice. The song was written approximately two years before it was released due to a pause in production cause by Saxe's insecurity about being able to perform in the composed octave on the second and third chorus. According to the sheet music published by Sony Music Publishing, the song was originally composed in the key of D♭ major and set to a "moderate" tempo of 90 BPM. Saxe's vocals range from G♭_{3} to A♭_{5}. Lyrically, the song describes struggling to let go of a former lover and move on after a break up. "I think it was a song I needed to write to get over the feeling that I wrote it about," Saxe commented to Elicit Magazine.

== Music video ==
An accompanying music video directed by Nick Leopold premiered September 16, 2020. The clip has a science fiction theme.

== Live performances ==
Saxe performed "A Little Bit Yours" and "If the World Was Ending" with Julia Michaels in Los Angeles, California as part of the Dick Clark's New Year's Rockin' Eve broadcast that aired December 31, 2020. Saxe performed "A Little Bit Yours" during an appearance on Jimmy Kimmel Live! on January 13, 2021.

== Charts ==
Chart (2020–2021)	Peak position
Canada Hot 100 (Billboard)	86
Canada AC (Billboard)	22
Canada CHR/Top 40 (Billboard)	28
Canada Hot AC (Billboard)	38
US Adult Pop Airplay (Billboard)	26

== Certifications and sales ==
Region	Certification	Certified units/sales
Canada (Music Canada)	Platinum	80,000^{‡}
United States (RIAA)	Gold	500,000^{‡}
^{‡} Sales+streaming figures based on certification alone.

== Release history ==
Country	Date	Format	Version	Label	Ref.
Various	September 2, 2020	Digital download; streaming	Original	Arista Records	
United States	October 26, 2020	Hot adult contemporary	Original	Arista Records	
