= The Baby in the Icebox =

Short story by James M. Cain

"The Baby in the Icebox" is a 1932 short story by James M. Cain and the first of his many works set in California during the Great Depression.

Written as a first-person narrative in the style of Ring Lardner, "The Baby in the Icebox" anticipated his first novel published two years later, The Postman Always Rings Twice.

== Plot summary ==
Duke and Lura are a married couple operating a rural roadside motor camp, lunchroom and filling station in southern California during the Great Depression. A hired hand working for the couple, who remains unnamed in the story, serves as witness and commentator to what transpires. The narrator is secretly devoted to the beautiful Lura, a country woman of independent character and tremendous physical strength. Duke, prone to boasting, is less vital and self-assured than his wife.

In hopes of drawing more customers, Duke decides to establish a feline exhibit. As such, he buys a number of untamed bobcats. Duke immediately proves inept at handling the animals, and violently kills one of the caged cats. The narrator is dismayed and angered when Duke enlists him to remove the carcass from among the antagonized bobcats. After Duke departs, Lura arrives, assesses the situation, and enters the enclosure; her poise and gentle entreaties soothe the animals, and she removes the dead bobcat. The narrator and Lura implicitly agree not to inform Duke of her courage and easy success with the cats.

Eager to create a menagerie, Duke purchases a mountain lion. When the female cat's nocturnal vocalizations draw a wild male lion from the surrounding countryside, the suitor inexplicably finds his way into the cage—a breach impossible without human meddling. Duke is dumbfounded, but credulous. Presumably the cats mate, and the male is dubbed "Romeo". Lura implies to the suspicious narrator her satisfaction with, or perhaps clandestine involvement in, the incident.

Styling himself as a skilled animal trainer, Duke puts on shows in which he enters the cat enclosures with a whip and a pistol to entertain the customers. Lura silently seethes at her husband's absurd and dangerous buffoonery. Business suffers. Duke compounds his delusional behavior when he purchases a Bengal tiger. He is determined to tame "Rajah". Despite the narrator's warnings, Duke enters the tiger cage only to discover that the animal has instantly identified the intruder as prey: Duke barely escapes with his life. Lura is informed of his panicked and humiliating retreat as witnessed by the customers. When Duke attempts to rationalize his failure to Lura, she reacts to his self-complacency with undisguised disgust.

Discerning his wife's disaffection, Duke escapes to the local backcountry, declaring that he is on an animal trapping expedition. He is absent for several weeks. While away, a snake oil salesman, the attractive Wild Bill Smith, stops for gasoline and lunch. He makes a pass at Lura, who sharply rebuffs his advance. Undeterred, "The Texas Tornado" returns the following day and Lura allows him to read her horoscope. She impresses Wild Bill with her command over Rajah. Lura and Bill enjoy a brief affair, and Lura contemplates absconding with him.

When Duke returns from his hunting trip, he is cheered to learn that Lura is with child. The narrator confronts Lura about her evident infidelities with Wild Bill, resentful yet sympathetic to her shame that she is carrying a child not her husband's. During the pregnancy she becomes increasingly attentive and affectionate with Rajah.

When Lura is in the hospital giving birth to her baby boy, Duke discovers an expensive ring among her possessions - a love gift, unbeknownst to Duke, from Wild Bill. He becomes suspicious, and confronts Lura. She confesses that she had a lover when he was on his extended trapping trip, but accuses him of his own infidelities. Duke realizes that the boy is not his own, and plans his revenge against his wife and the bastard child.

Duke purposefully starves the tiger and releases it into the house where he anticipates the beast will kill and eat Lura and the infant. The hungry tiger, in unfamiliar surroundings, acts threateningly toward Lura; she instantly seeks to protect her child. She fends off the animal with a blazing firebrand, seizes the baby from its crib and traps the tiger in a bedroom. In the kitchen, she empties the electric icebox of its frozen meat, and thrusts the swaddled child into the compartment after turning off the current.

Duke enters the house wearing his pistol. At first the couple feign mutual ignorance about the feline intruder. Then the enraged Lura assaults Duke, and with her superior strength subdues and easily disarms him. She drags him outdoors, and contemptuously throws the loaded gun after him. Duke picks up the weapon and fires. Lura collapses. Assuming he has killed his wife, Duke places the gun in her hand to establish her death as a suicide. He reenters the house and telephones the police, pleading innocence. Meanwhile, the firebrand has begun to blaze in the bedroom, and the panicked tiger crashes through the wall, encountering Duke on the telephone. The enraged cat mortally wounds the unarmed man, and both are immolated by the inferno. When the police and ambulance arrive, the house has burned to the ground. The seriously wounded Lura is taken to the hospital, suspected of attempted suicide and arson. Upon regaining consciousness, she tells the police where they will find her son. The narrator reports "The baby was in the icebox. They found him there, still asleep and ready for his milk. The fire had blacked up the outside, but inside it was cool and nice as a new bathtub."

Lura is exonerated and recovers from her gunshot wound. She and the narrator continue operating the filling station. When Wild Bill unexpectedly shows up, the narrator recognizes that his services are no longer required and quietly departs.

== Publication history ==
Cain conceived the story and characters during his frequent visits to the Goebels Lion Farm near Thousand Oaks, California in 1932, a measure of his fascination with large felines. Cain mentor H. L. Mencken, editor of The American Mercury paid Cain $250 for the story and published it in the journal's January 1933 edition. The story attracted interest both from book publishers and Hollywood film studios, propelling Cain's faltering literary career.

Hesitating to apply a first-person narrative to a longer literary form, Mencken and publisher Alfred A. Knopf Sr. exhorted Cain to embark upon a novel. Inspired, Cain wrote his first major literary work The Postman Always Rings Twice in 1934.

According to biographer Roy Hoopes, "The Baby in the Icebox" "is a tribute to Cain's ability to tell an improbable story—and make it eminently readable."

== Film adaption ==
Paramount Pictures obtained the rights to the story and the film adaptation appeared under the title She Made Her Bed in 1934, starring Richard Arlen and Sally Eilers. Critics "panned" the picture. She Made Her Bed was released just as Cain's notoriety and literary reputation were rising with the publication of The Postman Always Rings Twice, leading most reviewers to "relieve Cain of all responsibility for the film's failure."

== Sources ==
- Hoopes, Roy. 1981. The Baby in the Icebox and Other Short Fiction by James M. Cain. Holt, Rinehart & Winston. New York. ISBN 0-03-058501-5
- Hoopes, Roy. 1982. Cain. Holt, Rinehart and Winston. New York. ISBN 0-03-049331-5
- Madden, David. 1970. James M. Cain. Twayne Publishers, Inc. Library Catalog Card Number: 78-120011.
- Marling, William. 2012. James M. Cain. https://web.archive.org/web/20140614121023/http://www.detnovel.com/Cain_James.html
- Skenazy, Paul. 1989. James M. Cain. Continuum Publishing Company. New York. ISBN 0-8044-2821-2
