= Jealous Woman =

1950 novel by James M. Cain

- Cover of the first edition
- Author: James M. Cain
- Language: English
- Genre: Mystery novel
- Publisher: Alfred A. Knopf
- Publication date: 1950
- Publication place: United States
- Media type: Print (paperback)
- ISBN: 0887390889

Jealous Woman is a mystery novel by James M. Cain published in 1950 by Avon.

Cain returns to a plot concerning insurance fraud he had employed in his 1936 serial Double Indemnity, but here the story ends in marital bliss rather than in the ignominious deaths of the lovers.

Cain submitted the manuscript with the title Nevada Moon, but Avon renamed the work in hopes of improving paperback sales.

== Plot ==
The story unfolds in Reno, Nevada, in the post-war period. Ed Horner is an award-winning insurance agent; his ambition is to win more trophy cups for outstanding productivity. He meets East Coast socialite and film actress Jane Develan through an insurance case; she is seeking a divorce from her husband in Reno. When the husband dies mysteriously, she and Horner form an alliance to discover the cause of his death. The working class Horner equivocates between suspicion and attraction towards the beautiful and sophisticated Develan. They become romantically involved, but are at odds over their class orientations. When the insurance investigation is solved by the appearance of an eyewitness to the homicide, the couple's romance is consummated in marriage.

== Publication history ==
Jealous Woman originated at the behest of actor Edward G. Robinson, whose performance as the shrewd insurance investigator Keyes won him acclaim in film director Billy Wilder's Double Indemnity (1944). Cain complied, but rather than reproduce Robinson's character Keyes as the wise, paternalistic and relentless insurance investigator, Cain reduces the role in Jealous Woman to that of an incompetent "dupe" and elevates his junior investigator Ed Horner (Walter Huff in Cain's novel Double Indemnity) as the superior figure in the insurance company operations.

Cain's willingness to sell what he considered mediocre material to Avon was in part pecuniary, in part that he considered Jealous Woman outside the realm of his opus and therefore exempt from serious literary critique. He acquiesced to Avon's change in title from Nevada Moon to Jealous Woman because the publisher assured Cain that this would enhance sales. He collected a $1000 advance for the novel.

Avon released Jealous Woman in paperback in 1950.

== Critical assessment ==
We watch Cain the plot carpenter construct complications of action and character relationships; and, simultaneously, the characters themselves plot and execute intrigues—a visible, double fascination. But sometimes complications defeat Cain; for instance, the reader just cannot follow the intricacies of the insurance schemes and counter-schemes that proliferate in Jealous Woman.

— David Madden, James M. Cain (1970)

Jealous Woman is one of several novels written in the late 1940s and early 1950s that Cain would later dismiss from his oeuvre, in addition to Sinful Woman (1948), The Root of His Evil (1951), and Galatea.

Novelist and literary critic David Madden observes that "the little-known, low quality" Jealous Woman, along with its predecessor Sinful Woman (1948), were the closest Cain came to writing detective novels in the "Hammett-Chandler vein".

Cain's "happy ending" books of this period contrast sharply with his Depression-era novels. Literary critic Paul Skenazy writes:

Cain's return to the East began a new phase in his career, one notable for a further slackening of his artistic achievement and output ... Two small works appeared in paperback about the time of the move: Sinful Woman (1948) and Jealous Woman ..."

== Sources ==
- Hoopes, Roy. 1982. Cain. Holt, Rinehart and Winston. New York. ISBN 0-03-049331-5
- Madden, David. 1970. James M. Cain. Twayne Publishers, Inc. Library Catalog Card Number: 78-120011.
- Skenazy, Paul. 1989. James M. Cain. Continuum Publishing Company. New York. ISBN 0-8044-2821-2
