= The Taking of Montfaucon =

1929 short story by James M. Cain

The Taking of Montfaucon is a short story by James M. Cain first published in H. L. Mencken’s The American Mercury in 1929.

== Plot ==
The piece is an autobiographical account of Cain’s World War I combat experience during the Meuse–Argonne offensive, limited to the night of 26 September, 1918. The tale describes Cain's persistent but unsuccessful efforts to deliver a message to the 157th Infantry Brigade, establishing liaison with American headquarters staff.

== Reprints ==
The story was included in Cain’s first book, published in 1930 by Alfred A. Knopf, Our Government. "The Taking of Montfaucon" was reprinted in 1942 at the height of Cain’s critical and popular success during World War II in the Infantry Journal.

== Historical accuracy ==
Although "The Taking of Montfaucon" is purely an autobiographical and factual account, Cain elected to present the incident from a first-person narrative, in the colloquial speech of an unsophisticated recruit from rural America. Infantry Journal declared that the piece “had never been excelled as an accurate description of the condition in the war, and few stories of any aspect of war will stand beside it.”

== Sources ==
- Hoopes, Roy. 1981. The Baby in the Icebox and Other Short Fiction by James M. Cain. Holt, Rinehart & Winston. New York. ISBN 0-03-058501-5
- Hoopes, Roy. 1982. Cain. Holt, Rinehart and Winston. New York. ISBN 0-03-049331-5
- Madden, David. 1970. James M. Cain. Twayne Publishers, Inc. Library Catalog Card Number: 78-120011.
- Skenazy, Paul. 1989. James M. Cain. Continuum Publishing Company. New York. ISBN 0-8044-2821-2
