= The Embezzler (novella) =

Novella by James M. Cain

The Embezzler is a 1938 short novel by James M. Cain. The work first appeared as a serial in Liberty magazine in 1940 under the title Money and the Woman. In 1943, Alfred A. Knopf published the work as The Embezzler in a collection of novellas by Cain entitled Three of a Kind.

== Plot summary ==
Dave Bennett, a senior bank executive, makes a routine visit to one of its branch offices to observe operations; the branch's savings to commercial deposit ratio seems too good to be true. He discovers that the head teller, the elderly Charles Brent, is suffering from a stomach ulcer; the workaholic strenuously objects to taking leave for the needed surgery. His wife, Sheila, a very attractive young woman, asks Bennett to allow her to assume her husband's duties while he is in hospital, and both men consent.

While temporarily presiding over the branch, Bennett, as well as Sheila, discover that Charles is embezzling funds and has cunningly concealed the imbalance in the accounts. Charles is using the stolen funds to provide his mistress, an employee at the branch, with gifts. Rather than report the matter to his superiors, Bennett—who is falling in love with the beautiful Sheila—enters into a pact with the married woman to correct the accounts and conceal her husband's criminality. Sheila is motivated by her desire to protect her two children from the “disgrace” of having a convicted criminal for a father. Bennett is motivated by his infatuation with Sheila, though their relationship remains chaste. Released from the hospital, Charles Brent dies in an armed confrontation with the police. Bennett and Sheila are now free to marry.

== Publication history ==
Cain conceived the story after reading a study—"1001 Embezzlers"—submitted to him by Clarke Fitzpatrick, a former Baltimore Sun editor who was working at United States Fidelity and Guaranty Company, a firm Cain's father had once served. Written in early 1938, The Embezzler appeared in 1940 as a serial under the title Money and the Woman in Liberty magazine. Cain received $4,000 for the piece.

Struggling financially in his efforts to complete his story Mildred Pierce, Cain offered to sell the Liberty serial to Alfred A. Knopf as a novel. The publisher considered the novella too short to qualify as a stand alone work, but included it in a collection of serials, retitled The Embezzler, and with Double Indemnity and Career in C Major, issued it in Three of a Kind in 1943. Cain obtained a $1,250 advance for his short novel.

== Film adaption ==
In 1940,Warner Brothers obtained the film rights to Money and the Woman for which the studio paid Cain $3,500. He was engaged as a script writer on the project at $1,000 per week. According to biographer Roy Hoopes, Warners was reassured that Cain's short novel provided them with an "upbeat ending", in contrast to his hardboiled novels and short stories that often ended in murder, such as The Postman Always Rings Twice and Serenade.

The producers at Warners were anxious that the Hays Office might censor the production because the female protagonist, Sheila Brent, proves unfaithful to her husband. Producer William Jacobs vetoed these objections and insisted the film adhere to the book's narrative, but the screenplay writing was entrusted to Robert Presnell Jr., not Cain. The Warner picture, which retained the serial title, released Money and the Woman in October 1940, with Jeffrey Lynn and Brenda Marshall in the leading roles.

Essentially a B movie, Money and the Woman was largely ignored by critics and "dismissed by Variety and Time as dull fare...a good story to which something happened on its way to the celluloid." Biographer David Madden reports that the picture "offered good, solid, glittery entertainment [but] attracted very little critical attention." The project was financially rewarding to Cain, and he returned to writing novels.

== Sources ==
- Hoopes, Roy. 1981. The Baby in the Icebox and Other Short Fiction by James M. Cain. Holt, Rinehart & Winston. New York. ISBN 0-03058501-5
- Hoopes, Roy. 1982. Cain. Holt, Rinehart and Winston. New York. ISBN 0-03-049331-5
- Hoopes, Roy. 1986. Career in C Major and Other Fiction. McGraw-Hill Book Company. New York. ISBN 0-07-009593-0
- Madden, David. 1970. James M. Cain. Twayne Publishers, Inc. Library Catalog Card Number: 78-120011.
- Skenazy, Paul. 1989. James M. Cain. Continuum Publishing Company. New York. ISBN 0-8044-2821-2
