= The Cocktail Waitress =

Novel by James M. Cain, published posthumously in 2012

- Cover of the first edition
- Author: James M. Cain
- Language: English
- Genre: Hardboiled novel
- Publisher: Hard Case Crime
- Publication date: 2012
- Publication place: United States
- Media type: Print (hardcover)
- ISBN: 978-1-78116-032-9

The Cocktail Waitress is a novel by James M. Cain published posthumously in 2012 by Hard Case Crime press.

The last of Cain's novels, this so-called "lost" work was assembled from a number of undated manuscripts by archivist and novelist Charles Ardai.

The Cocktail Waitress resembles Cain's 1941 novel Mildred Pierce in plot and theme, but, in contrast, employs a first-person point-of-view to tell the tragic story of heroine Joan Medford rather than the third-person narration he used in the earlier work.

== Plot ==
Joan Medford is a twenty-one year old married woman, whose alcoholic husband has died in a car crash that some, including her ex-husband's family, find suspicious. Left destitute with a small child to support, she takes a tip from a kindly police sergeant and finds a job at a cocktail bar in a restaurant. Despite no experience, Joan does well from the first night as Joan is an attractive young woman who doesn't mind the skimpy costumes and the flirting that she needs to do in order to maximise tips. She soon catches the eye of two of the bar's regular patrons: one, Earl K White III, a rich older widower who loves her but fears his angina stands in the way of the serious relationship he craves; and the other, Tom Barclay, an attractive sensual man nearer her own age. Joan is confused when the older man gives her a cheque for $30,000 dollars, apparently without strings, but she banks the money and uses it to buy a rental house, furniture and a used car. Her friendship with Tom develops, and she agrees to a date, which turns out disastrously as Tom takes her to a local whorehouse masquerading as a bar/restaurant. Joan is attracted to Tom but panics and runs out nearly naked and drives home. After a few days, Tom appears at her bungalow, and gives her the shocking news that a friend of his, who was about to be tried for alleged corruption in public office, has skipped bail and vanished. This news hits Joan hard, since trusting Tom she had agreed to help Tom's friend by putting up her new house as bail collateral. Meanwhile, a dogged young police officer is unsatisfied with the apparent accident that caused the death of Joan's husband and is continuing to investigate.

== Publication history ==
Upon completing his penultimate novel, The Institute (1976) in 1975, Cain began writing a historical novel story similar in plot and theme to his successful 1941 novel Mildred Pierce. This work would appear 37 years later as The Cocktail Waitress.

Cain, conflicted as to what narrative point-of-view he would employ, began the story using the third-person. Unsatisfied with the effect, Cain “once and for all” committed himself to a first-person confessional narration, rewriting the work in the “lingo” of his female protagonist, Joan Medford.

Cain worked on The Cocktail Waitress throughout 1975. He sent a manuscript to his agent Dorothy Olding. Publisher Orlando Petrocelli requested a rewrite of the ending, and when Cain failed to deliver satisfactory edits, Petrocelli and Olding shelved the novel. The Cocktail Waitress existed in several incomplete and undated drafts when Cain died on October 27, 1977, at age 85.

Novelist and archivist Charles Ardai was alerted to the existence of these manuscripts by Cain biographer Roy Hoopes in 2002. He discovered the “long lost” drafts and assembled The Cocktail Waitress, published in 2012, 35 years after the author's death.

== Critical assessment ==
Critic Len Gurkin on The Cocktail Waitress:

If even Cain’s best novels were, as Joyce Carol Oates sternly insists in a 1967 essay, a little too trashy to be literature — “there is always something sleazy, something eerily vulgar and disappointing in his work” — his later work fails even to be sleazy. No longer eerily vulgar, these tedious efforts are instead eerily amateurish, even incompetent. Where did the ear go? Where is the vaunted craft? I know of no other major writer who so completely lost his touch. Which brings us to The Cocktail Waitress...”

Literary critic Michael Connelly on The Cocktail Waitress:

“... the femme fatale tells her own story, the narration coming direct from Joan in the form of a self-taped statement setting the record straight. The setup leaves the reader to decide whether Joan is telling the truth, or only the truth as she sees it…the plot seams occasionally show or are seen coming far in advance of the denouement. Though narrated by Joan, the story is at times stilted and awkward, as if the author has lost the thread of his character’s voice.

== Sources ==
- Connelly, Michael. 2012. Last Call. The New York Times. 23 September 2012. https://www.nytimes.com/2012/09/23/books/review/the-cocktail-waitress-by-james-m-cain.html Retrieved 10 July 2022.
- Gutkin, Len. 2012. The Terrifying Wish that Comes True: On Cain's 'The Cocktail Waitress. The Los Angeles Review of Books. 16 September 2012. https://lareviewofbooks.org/article/the-terrifying-wish-that-comes-true-on-cains-the-cocktail-waitress/ Retrieved 10 July 2022.
- Tucker, Neely. 2012. Long lost James M. Cain novel published. The Washington Post. 27 September 2012. https://www.washingtonpost.com/lifestyle/style/long-lost-james-m-cain-novel-published/2012/09/27/dd1046c4-074e-11e2-858a-5311df86ab04_story.html Retrieved 10 August 2022.
