= The Magician's Wife (Cain novel) =

1965 novel by James M. Cain

- Cover of the first edition
- Author: James M. Cain
- Language: English
- Genre: Hardboiled novel
- Publisher: Dial Press
- Publication date: 1965
- Publication place: United States
- Media type: Print (hardcover and paperback)
- ISBN: 978-0887480188

The Magician's Wife is a novel by James M. Cain published in 1965 by Dial Press.

In plot and theme, the work is a near facsimile of Cain's 1934 critical and popular success, The Postman Always Rings Twice.

The Magician's Wife is one of only three of Cain's fourteen novels published in his lifetime that he wrote in the third-person narrative form; the others are Mildred Pierce (1941) and Love's Lovely Counterfeit (1942). The bulk of his novels are written from his preferred first-person point of view.

Despite Dial's efforts to revive Cain's career with The Magician's Wife, it proved a commercial and critical disappointment. Cain would not see another of his novels published until 1975.

== Publication history ==
Cain modeled The Magician's Wife on the same formula he employed in his novels of the 1930s: "An adulterous triangle, the murder of the husband…an animal abandon to sexuality, a fixation on eating [and] the two lovers turn on each other, and both die."

Cain began The Magician's Wife as a first-person narrative, delivered by the lead protagonist, Clay Lockwood. He reconsidered after examining his 1941 novel Mildred Pierce and decided to switch the point-of-view of his work in progress to a third-person narrative. This decision would contribute to the "excessive verbiage" that characterizes the novel.

"Sally Alexis is an extreme version of Cain's violence-charged, dominant, animal-like females. When she helps force a car off the road, an 'odor' appears, an over-secretion, she explains: 'Things affect that way sometimes…Gives me a funny smell—like a rattlesnake, kind of. Want some nice rattlesnake love?'"—Paul Skenazy's James M. Cain (1989)

The editorial management at Dial was in disarray when Cain began writing The Magician's Wife in 1963. Jim Silberman Dial's editor, left for Random House, and Dial saw a succession of chief editors: Richard Baron, Henry Robbins, and E. L. Doctorow, limiting the timely guidance Cain requested for revisions.

A first draft of The Magician's Wife was completed in November 1963, and Cain sent it to his agent Ivan von Auw. His response was cool, questioning the credibility of the characters. Cain rewrote the novel, changing the ending from a happy one into one that involves a double homicide and the death of the hero. Dial approved the revised version for publication pending some unspecified changes. The newest chief editor, E. L. Doctorow, demanded detailed edits, and according to Cain, gave him a "writing lesson." By early 1965, Cain was making major revisions to The Magician's Wife, though Dial appeared to be indifferent as to whether completed the novel or not.

During this period, Dial published Norman Mailer's An American Dream (1965). In critic Tom Wolfe's New York Herald Tribune's Book Week review of the work, he commented that Mailer's literary style emulated that of James M. Cain, but regretted that he "could not match Cain in writing dialogue, creating characters, or carrying character through a long story…"

This high praise from a Wolfe, a "darling" of the devotees of New York's "New Journalism" prompted Dial to capitalize on this "rediscovery" of Cain's oeuvre, and moved quickly to publish The Magician's Wife in 1965, investing in a major promotion of the novel.

== Critical assessment ==
The Magician's Wife, which plot-wise is "almost a rewrite" of The Postman Always Rings Twice, lacks the 1934 novel's deft rendering of character. In The Magician's Wife Cain requires "lengthy expressions" to convey insights into his protagonist's backgrounds and motivations. The novel is a "flabby, mangled version of the same basic structure" employed by Cain in his 1934 magnum opus The Postman Always Rings Twice.

Despite efforts to rescue Cain from "literary obscurity", the reviews for The Magician's Wife were mixed, and the sales mediocre. A reviewer at Time declared that Cain's body of work was always "bordering on a trash heap" but had advanced to "pure trash" with his latest publication. Despite efforts by his agent Harold Norling Swanson, the film studios emphatically rejected the novel.

According to biographer Roy Hoopes, The Magician's Wife "brought the curtain down on Cain's efforts to make something of himself as a serious writer..." Cain would not see published another of his book for ten years, though he continued to write them.

== Sources ==
- Hoopes, Roy. 1982. Cain. Holt, Rinehart and Winston. New York. ISBN 0-03-049331-5
- Madden, David. 1970. James M. Cain. Twayne Publishers, Inc. Library Catalog Card Number: 78-120011.
- Skenazy, Paul. 1989. James M. Cain. Continuum Publishing Company. New York. ISBN 0-8044-2821-2
