= The Enchanted Isle (novel) =

1985 novel by James M. Cain

- Cover of the first edition
- Author: James M. Cain
- Language: English
- Genre: Hardboiled novel
- Publisher: Mysterious Press
- Publication date: 1985
- Publication place: United States
- Media type: Print (hardcover and paperback)
- ISBN: 978-0892961436

The Enchanted Isle is a novel by James M. Cain published by The Mysterious Press in 1985.

== Plot summary ==
The 16-year-old Amanda "Mandy" Vernick recounts the events of The Enchanted Isle in this first-person narrative. Her self-image is centered on her physique, described by Mandy as "five foot two, 36-24-35, 105 pounds, blond hair, blue eyes" and figure she calls "extra good". She has endured her stepfather Steve Baker's physical and quasi-sexual abuse since puberty, with the tacit consent of her biological mother. She runs away when she discovers that her 30-year-old mother is having a secret affair with a wealthy man named Wilmer. She runs away to Baltimore in search of her biological father, with whom she hopes to bond and abscond to a remote tropical island, the "Enchanted Isle" of the book's title. En route to Baltimore, Mandy pairs up with Rick, like Mandy, a disaffected youth. When her "biological" father denies his paternity, she and Rick perpetrate a bank robbery. They escape, but Rick flees with the money and Mandy is compelled to return home. There, she discovers that Wilmer is in fact her biological father. In an act of vengeance, the young Rick guns down Steve and Mandy's mother, fulfilling Mandy's secret Electra complex.

== Publication history ==
The manuscript for The Enchanted Isle did not reach the desk of Knopf's editor William Koshland, as Cain's own literary agents, Dorothy Olding and Ivan van Auw, did not consider the work publishable. Cain began to wonder if he was "through as a novelist".

Cain's Hollywood contact, Harold Norling Swanson, attempted to interest the movie studios in the novel. He changed the manuscript title to "The Mink Coat", emphasizing the topicality of a story dealing with "kids who run away from home these days". Hollywood showed no interest and the novel was never adapted to film.

The Enchanted Isle was published by The Mysterious Press in 1985. His final novel, The Cocktail Waitress (2012) was also published posthumously.

== Critical assessment ==
Cain long-time friend and admirer Ruth Goetz at Knopf publishers, after reading a draft of The Enchanted Isle, exhorted Cain to "get back to those wonderfully seedy, lousy no-goods that you have always understood so wonderfully and written so superbly". Literary critic Paul Skenazy comments on the misanthropy evident in Cain's The Enchanted Isle:

Cloud Nine (1984) and The Enchanted Isle are more humanly demeaning than the earlier works because they seem unredeemed by any emotional investment...[these novels] are objectionable because they titillate just for the fun of it. Cain seems less to be pandering to the public than writing for himself. The world he sees and understands and can represent in fiction has devolved into a perverse little community of nasty creatures displaying themselves in an outdated set of literary conventions.

== Sources ==
- Cain, James M. 1985. The Enchanted Isle. The Mysterious Press, New York. ISBN 0-89296-143-0
- Hoopes, Roy. 1982. Cain. Holt, Rinehart, and Winston. New York. ISBN 0-03-049331-5
- Skenazy, Paul. 1989. James M. Cain. Continuum Publishing Company. New York. ISBN 0-8044-2821-2
