= Mignon (novel) =

1962 novel by James M. Cain

- Cover of the first edition
- Author: James M. Cain
- Language: English
- Genre: Historical novel
- Publisher: Dial Press
- Publication date: 1962
- Publication place: United States
- Media type: Print (hardcover and paperback)
- ISBN: 9781453291610

Mignon is a historical novel by James M. Cain published by the Dial Press in 1962. Along with Past All Dishonor (1946), Mignon is one of Cain’s two historical novels set during the American Civil War.

Cain's virtues as a master of the first-person narrative form are adulterated in Mignon, when his protagonist's confessional recounting of events takes on the “forced rhetoric” of some of Cain's disappointing third-person novels.

Regarding his novel Mignon, the product of over ten years of research and revision, Cain lamented “it was the most ill-starred venture I ever embarked on.”

== Plot summary ==
Mignon is set during the Confederacy's Red River campaign of 1864 during the American Civil War. A war veteran and engineer, William “Bill” Cresap is discharged from the Union army with a leg wound. He travels to Texas to plan construction for a canal linking the Red River to the Gulf Coast. At first sight he falls madly in love with the beautiful widow Mignon Fournet, daughter of a New Orleans cotton speculator, Adolph Landry. Cresap becomes embroiled in the war-time black market operations that abound, descending into a labyrinth of shifting alliances, betrayals, murders and double-crosses with Landry and his unscrupulous and dangerous partner Frank Burke. When Landry, a man of mixed national loyalties, is jailed as a traitor, Cresap attempts to free him on Mignon's behalf. Burke tempts all the parties with a risky scheme to seize a rich trove of “hoo-dooed” cotton.

The story culminate in the death of all the main characters, except Cresap, who survives to tell the tale and to bitterly regret the loss of “my love, my life, my beautiful little Mignon.”

== Publication background ==
Mignon was the only literary product to emerge from his decade-long effort to write a trilogy using the American Civil War as a backdrop. Critic Paul Skenazy reports that “Mignon sapped his energy, deflected him from other projects, and produced a situation of enormous frustration and artistic stagnation…”

In early 1953, Cain began research for a Civil War trilogy, traveling to historic sites in Texas and Mexico related to the Red River campaign of 1863. For three years, Cain struggled with developing the novel, using the most commercially successful of his novels, Past All Dishonor (1946), as a template. Though suffering from ill health due to high cholesterol, he completed a manuscript for Mignon in early 1957.

“In Mignon, Cain is so immersed in his exhaustively researched background that historical accuracy impedes the development of human drama…Cain can become obsessively preoccupied with pedestrian matters.”—Novelist and biographer David Madden in James M. Cain (1970).

His publisher, Knopf, was dissatisfied with the work, complained that Mignon was “altogether too complicated, and yet perhaps not involved enough.” Rather than let his New York agents Harold Ober Associates sell the story as a magazine serial, Cain proceeded to rewrite the work.

By 1960, Magnon had become Cain's "albatross", but when he resubmitted the revised work, Knopf again turned it down. Cain was loath to give up the novel after his years of exhaustive historical research on the project. His agent Ivan von Auw succeeded in interesting Dial publishers in Mignon, who provided Cain a $1000 advance.

In the spring of 1962, Dell released Mignon in a hardback edition.

== Critical assessment ==
Cain, hoping he had penned a literary work possessing tremendous commercial potential, discovered that Mignon fell far short of his expectations. Though the work ultimately sold 15,000 hard-copy editions and was acquired by paperback publisher Dell press, Cain's 12 years of research, revisions and rejections emerged as a “literary failure.” His agent Jerry Wald informed Cain that the novel was unsuitable for film adaptation. Agent Harold Norling Swanson’s efforts to interest Hollywood also failed. According to biographer Roy Hoopes, “Mignon was perhaps the low point of Cain’s life.” Literary critic Paul Skenazy points out Cain's difficulty assembling a coherent narrative:

Mignon is an embattled mixture of a story of commerce, a story of love, a story of voodoo and superstition, and a story of honor, glory, and war...a mixture of the historically accurate, rhetorically sentimental and anachronistically tough...Mignon is a pastiche of elements Cain fails to integrate.”

Skenazy adds that “Cain’s [historical] knowledge is impressive but intrusive.”. Novelist David Madden likewise points to Mignon’s faulty use of literary devices:

One winces at failures of technique in Cain more painfully than in "serious" fiction because there is not much more to Cain than skillful execution of technique. Sometimes stock suspense devices mar the novels: the tell-tale note in the wastebasket, the lovely decoy, obvious foreshadowing, movie alibis (in four novels), clumsy coincidences—all found in Mignon...

In Luther Nichols’ interview with Cain in 1962, the author vowed “I shall never, as long as I live, try a period novel again. It is like a sentence in a penitentiary...you refuse to leave your cell until the time is up.” Cain later added, “All that reading and labor, and a kind of mouse is born.”

== Theme ==
The risks and rewards inherent to loyalties—to family, to business associates, to cause and country—emerge as thematic parallels in Mignon. Fate is symbolized by the black market “hoo-doo” cotton, in which Southern preternatural powers clash with Northern army martial law. David Madden observes that “Superstition and supernatural are at the center of Mignon; the great quantity of cotton for which most of the characters cheat, betray, connive, kill and suffer is constantly described as being ‘hoo-dooed’”

Cain introduces the paradox of sacred love and homicide, in which that latter becomes an expression of the former, both on a personal and national level. Paul Skenazy writes: “Cain’s point is that only through violence can one nation gain control over the feelings of another. The national or political destinies follow a course exactly parallel to love....Mignon Fournet’s [sexual] desire is inflamed by violence...Bill Cresap’s willingness to kill for love becomes a sign of the depth of his feeling.”

== Sources ==
- Hoopes, Roy. 1982. Cain. Holt, Rinehart and Winston. New York. ISBN 0-03-049331-5
- Madden, David. 1970. James M. Cain. Twayne Publishers, Inc. Library Catalog Card Number: 78-120011.
- Skenazy, Paul. 1989. James M. Cain. Continuum Publishing Company. New York. ISBN 0-8044-2821-2
