= The Moth (novel) =

1948 novel by James M. Cain

- Cover of the first edition
- Author: James M. Cain
- Language: English
- Genre: Autobiographical novel
- Publisher: Alfred A. Knopf
- Publication date: 1948
- Publication place: United States
- Media type: Print (hardcover and paperback)
- ISBN: 978-0451008114

The Moth is a novel by James M. Cain published in 1948 by Alfred A. Knopf. At over three-hundred pages, The Moth is Cain's "most personal, most ambitious and longest book" in his œuvre, attempting to convey a "broad, social landscape" of America in the 1930s.

The novel is essentially a semi-autobiographical and picaresque work examining the Great Depression through the experiences of a 22-year-old drifter.

== Plot summary ==
The Moth traces the life of Jack Dillon from childhood to middle age, in a saga that begins and ends in Baltimore, Maryland, with a sojourn in California during the Great Depression. Dillion is raised in a well-to-do family and enjoys performing as a choir boy, a high-school football champion and a Vaudeville troupe member in his youth. He becomes engaged to a local girl, but secretly develops a passion for her beautiful 12-year-old sister, Helen Legg. Dillion comes under unfounded accusations of having seduced Helen, and is forced to flee his home, but not before his father has lost his son's savings in the Wall Street crash of 1929.

For years Dillion rides the rails as a hobo during the depths of the depression, working a multitude of skilled and unskilled jobs. In California he marries a woman who possesses an oil field. Dillion makes the enterprise profitable, but his wife discovers his obsession with Helen, and they divorce. He returns home to Maryland and is reconciled with his father. Helen, now a young woman, unites with Dillion and they live happily ever after.

== Publication history ==
In April 1947 Cain embarked on his most ambitious literary project, a quasi-autobiographical novel, The Moth. He completed the first draft in December 1947.

The origins of the story can be traced back to the early 1930s, shortly after Cain arrived in California to first work as a Hollywood screenwriter. He witnessed mass unemployment, including the transient workers—"hobos"—whom he saw riding boxcars near the studios. Biographer David Madden notes that "Cain deliberately presents a detailed picture of the life of the hobo, the migrant worker [coming] closer to the proletarian writing of the 1930s than to the tough-guy school.”

When Cain sent the manuscript to Alfred A. Knopf publishers, they praised the work, but registered concern about the pedophilic impulses of the protagonist Jack Dillon. An implied sexual encounter between a man in his early 20s and a 12-year-old girl, Helen Legg, prompted Cain's own sister, Rosalie, to caution her brother to remove the scene. Cain insisted that the attraction was central to the story, denying any licentiousness. Nevertheless, he edited the material, introducing a platonic element into the relationship, hoping to make the novel palatable to Knopf, the film studios and the book clubs. Biographer Roy Hoopes writes: "The James M.Cain who had written about adultery, murder, homosexuality, prostitution, and incest without caring what the studios and book clubs thought was mellowing".

The Moth was published in November 1948.

== Critical Assessment ==
Upon publication, Cain's longest and most personal novel "was not being judged an overwhelming success" despite Knopf's assurance to critics who considered Cain a pulp writer that the novel provided "a wider [social] implication".

“The Moth covers a great number of years, much territory, many episodes, and studies the manners of a multiplicity of people and many aspects of human nature. An obvious attempt at a serious theme, The Moth flits too much; details weigh it down; it is too long—a failure of style and technique on the whole…most of Cain’s [best] stories, being concerned with a few characters over a short period of time, lend themselves to brevity".—Novelist David Madden in James M. Cain (1970)

Among Cain's champions were Stephen Longstreet of the Los Angeles Daily News, calling The Moth "a great book by a great author" and Sterling North who lauded the novel as "authentic poetry". The unfavorable and often scurrilous reviews dominated, from the Houston Post, The New Yorker, Time, and The New York Herald Tribune. The New York Times’ James MacBride wrote "it is sad to report that Cain’s latest, most ambitious book was also his dullest"; Merle Miller in the Saturday Review wrote that in The Moth, Cain "writes the way you think Rocky Graziano might if he were more literate". These negative assessments contributed to the poor sales of the novel, leading Cain to remark ruefully that "a simple tale, told briefly, is what people really like". By August 1948, The Moth had sold a "disappointing" 25,000 copies.

Biographer David Madden lamented that “The Moth was an effort to let the Great Depression happen to one man [and] might have produced one Cain’s finest novels; but certain autobiographical elements entered into his conception and delayed the novel’s thrust into the depression material".

== Theme ==
The Moth, according to biographer Roy Hoopes is "easily Cain’s most autobiographical effort…” The novel opens with an idealized recollection of Cain's childhood encounter with a beautiful Luna moth, and his relief when the creature escaped from a boy who attempted to kill it. The moth serves as a symbol, appearing before protagonist Jack Dillion "whenever life reaches a state of perfection". The object of his desire, Helen Legg "is the only person who recognizes the insect’s beauty" other than Dillon.

The work is the last of Cain's four novels to feature opera as an element of the story; the others are Serenade (1937), Mildred Pierce (1941) and Career in C Major (1943)

The 12-year-old Helen appears as a Lolita-like figure, and Dillon's love recalling Edgar Allan Poe's attraction to young girls.

Novelist David Madden notes that Cain's character Jack Dillon "is nothing like the world-weary Humbert Humbert. Jack’s relationship with Helen is explicitly healthy, for the protection of her purity is his primary concern; Cain simply recognizes in this athletic American the presence of what might be considered an abnormal desire". Literary critic Paul Skenazy observes:

With one hand Cain seems determined to convince a reader of the fated correctness of this love, while with his other he deliberately establishes his plot around a situation of child and adult that is tantalizing and suggestive. Cain wants the story to culminate in fulfillment and not despair and destruction, and so spares his hero and heroine any taint of immorality".

Cain disclosed in his Memoir (unpublished) a lifelong attraction to young girls, and that his first sexual encounter resembled that described in The Moth.

Cain himself remarked: “The Moth, I thought, had some vitality as an étude in the love life of a twelve-year-old girl, but in many ways it was faulty. I may be taking another try at a similar theme, perhaps really carrying on that story in a different setting".

== Sources ==
- Hoopes, Roy. 1982. Cain. Holt, Rinehart and Winston. New York. ISBN 0-03-049331-5
- Madden, David. 1970. James M. Cain. Twayne Publishers, Inc. Library Catalog Card Number: 78-120011.
- Skenazy, Paul. 1989. James M. Cain. Continuum Publishing Company. New York. ISBN 0-8044-2821-2
