= Jungleland USA =

Defunct private zoo, animal training facility, and theme park

Coordinates: 34.174095°N 118.847544°W

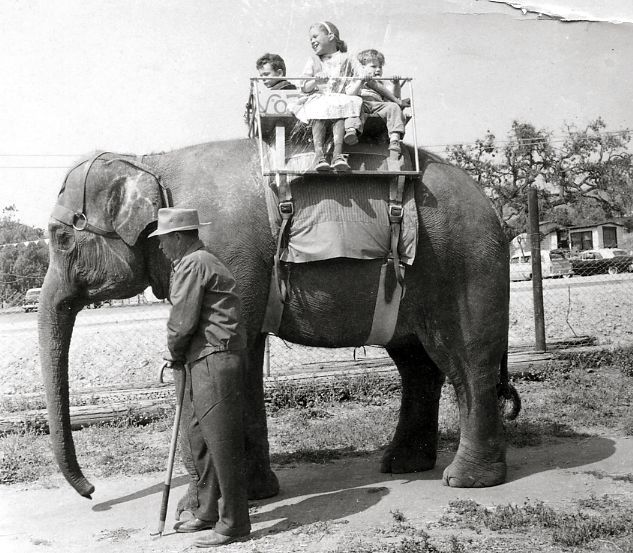
- Children on an elephant at Jungleland, 1962
- Interactive map of Jungleland USA
- Date opened: 1926
- Date closed: October 1969
- Land area: 170 acres (69 ha)

Jungleland USA was a private zoo, animal training facility, and animal theme park in Thousand Oaks, California, United States, on the current site of the Thousand Oaks Civic Arts Plaza. At its peak the facility encompassed 170 acres (69 ha).

== History ==
Louis Goebel created Jungleland in 1926 as a support facility for Hollywood. He had been employed at Universal Studios when the studio decided to close its animal facility. Five of the Universal Studio lions formed the nucleus of Goebel's collection. The facility was originally called Goebel's Lion Farm and then Goebel's Wild Animal Farm. Soon a wide variety of exotic animals were obtained, trained, and rented to the studios for use in films. The facility later became a theme park, opened to the public in 1929.

I have got so that if I go out for an afternoon's drive, I usually wind up at Goebel's Lion Farm, smoking a cigarette with Bert Parks, the chief attendant. God in Heaven, a cat is something to look at! I have followed all the doings out there faithfully, from the birth of the leopard cubs to the unfortunate fate of Jiggs when he strayed into a cage with two she-lions and got frightfully chewed up. I learned with great interest what happened when Paramount sent a star out there to have his picture taken feeding Caesar, as a bit of publicity for a forthcoming picture. Instead of biting the meat Caesar bit the actor. First time I knew a lion liked ham.

— James M. Cain, "Paradise" in American Mercury (1933)

Wild animal shows entertained thousands in the 1940s and 1950s. Mabel Stark, the "lady lion tamer", was featured in these shows; she also doubled for Mae West in the lion-taming scenes in the 1933 film I'm No Angel. The zoo's residents included Leo the Lion, mascot of the Metro-Goldwyn-Mayer studio; Mister Ed, the talking horse from the television show of the same name; Bimbo the elephant from the Circus Boy television series; and Tamba the chimpanzee, featured in the Jungle Jim movies and television series.

Many TV and movie productions used the park's trained animals, and many productions were filmed there, including The Birth of a Nation, The Fugitive, Tarzan the Ape Man, Doctor Dolittle, and The Adventures of Robin Hood. It was also featured prominently in an episode of the television show Route 66 (Season 2, Episode 31, "Hell Is Empty, All The Devils Are Here").

A barn fire in 1940 killed 12 of the animals including tigers, camels and elephants. The park made headlines in 1966 when a male lion at the compound named Sammy mauled Zoltán Hargitay, the young son of actors Mickey Hargitay and Jayne Mansfield.

Jungleland closed in October 1969, because of competition from other Southern California amusement parks, and because the facility "didn't blend in" with the increasingly urban character of Thousand Oaks. The company which owned the facilities declared bankruptcy and sold all the movable property at auction: animals, buildings, trucks, furniture and supplies. Goebel retained ownership of the land, which was eventually sold to the city to create the Civic Arts Plaza and other developments.

== See also ==
- List of defunct amusement parks
- List of former zoos and aquariums
