= Crashing the Gates (play) =

Crashing the Gates is a play written by James M. Cain and produced by Philip Goodman in 1926. The play’s plot dramatizes the labor struggles in the West Virginia coal mines of the 1920s and the evangelical Christian fundamentalism prevalent among poor whites in the region. The tragic denouement anticipates the exposure of pseudo-clericism in Sinclair Lewis’ Elmer Gantry (1927).

Crashing the Gates opened in New England, but its didactic theme and profanity displeased audiences and the play closed shortly after its debut.

== Plot summary ==
Crashing the Gates is set in a rural coal mining region of West Virginia during the violent struggles for the unionization of mine workers. The chief protagonist is Linda Hicks, an uneducated Christian fanatic who eagerly awaits the Second Coming of Christ. Her husband is the unemployed and demoralized Buzz Hicks. Their son Oakey is an invalid, crippled in a mining accident. Their daughter, Sally Jewell, is an adoptee. When the itinerant con-man and charismatic preacher, Syd Gody, arrives in the community Linda accepts him as the Savior; Gody seduces her.

Linda’s evangelical fervor leads Gody to believe he is the returned Messiah. He unsuccessfully attempts to raise the dead from a local cemetery. When Gosy fails to heal Linda’s son, the boy exposes his charlatanism. Gody repents, and offers his gun to Oakey to kill him. The boy accidentally shoots himself with the weapon, and Gody is detained as the suspected murderer. When Sally discovers her step-brother's death, she flees hysterically from his corpse, and is shot down by her step-father Buzz, mistaking her for Syd Gody. Gody is cleared of the murder charge, but renounces his evangelical illusions and returns to work in the mines.

Linda remains loyal to both her faith and to Gody.

== Production Background ==
In the mid-1920s Cain’s growing reputation as a talented writer of short dialogues drew the interest of the playwright Philip Goodman. Biographer and novelist David Madden provides the antecedents to Cain’s first theatrical effort:

H. L. Mencken arranged for Cain to meet [theatrical producer] Philip Goodman...Goodman had read some of Cain’s dramatic dialogues in The American Mercury and thought Cain could do a play for him. Cain discussed the [dramatic possibilities of a story] based on the widely prevalent feeling in the West Virginia mine fields that the Second Coming was near.

Goodman initially proposed titling the work "Crashing the Pearly Gates", investing $8000 of his own funds to stage the play. Playwright George S. Kaufman praised the show after seeing the dress rehearsal. The leading cast members included Charles Bickford, Helen Freeman and Elizabeth Bryan Allen. Bickford challenged Goodman to hire the emerging actor James Cagney for the production. Bickford suggested he would be willing to relinquish his starring role to Cagney.

Crashing the Gates opened in Stamford, Connecticut and Worcester, Massachusetts in February 1926.

== Critical and Popular Reaction ==
The initial production in Stamford elicited “outrage” from a number of audience members due to the profanity in the second act, “the strongest language ever heard on a stage until that time”, in which the disabled Oakey condemns Gody and his mother Linda as frauds. The reaction prompted Cain to immediately remove much of the offensive language from the script.

The Worcester production elicited a mixed review from the Worcester Telegram, praising the word as “truly heroic in its treatment of a startling theme” and “brilliantly written” adding that “the stylish thing to do after the final curtain and during the entire journey home was to condemn it with self-conscious virtue that was still inwardly pleased with the shock.” Crashing the Gates closed in two weeks.

Cain had assumed that the profanity that accompanied the contemporary social conflicts in the early 20th Century would not be judged on the “pruderies of the Victorian Age. Biographer Roy Hoopes reports that after the production “Cain never used profanity in his writing, except for an occasional line that could not be avoided.”

== Sources ==
- Hoopes, Roy. 1981. The Baby in the Icebox and Other Short Fiction by James M. Cain. Holt, Rinehart & Winston. New York. ISBN 0-03058501-5
- Hoopes, Roy. 1982. Cain. Holt, Rinehart and Winston. New York. ISBN 0-03-049331-5
- Madden, David. 1970. James M. Cain. Twayne Publishers, Inc. Library Catalog Card Number: 78-120011.
- Skenazy, Paul. 1989. James M. Cain. Continuum Publishing Company. New York. ISBN 0-8044-2821-2
