= Rainbow's End =

Rainbow's or Rainbows End may refer to:

== Film and TV ==
- "Rainbow's End", a 1978 episode of The Incredible Hulk
- "Rainbow's End", a 1997 episode of Walker, Texas Ranger
- Rainbow's End (1935 film), a 1935 American Western film
- Rainbow's End (1995 film), a 1995 Australian TV film

== Literature ==
- Rainbow's End (Cain novel), a 1975 novel by James M. Cain
- Rainbow's End (Grimes novel), a 1995 novel by Martha Grimes
- Rainbows End (Vinge novel), a 2006 novel by Vernor Vinge
- Rainbow's End (play), a 2005 Australian play by Jane Harrison

== Music ==
- Rainbow's End (album), a 1979 album by Resurrection Band
- Rainbow's End: An Anthology 1973–1985, a 2010 compilation album by Camel
- "Rainbow's End", a song by Amanda Palmer and Edward Ka-Spel from I Can Spin a Rainbow, 2017
- "Rainbow's End", a song by Camel from Breathless, 1978
- "Rainbow's End", a song by Jo O'Meara from Relentless, 2005
- "Rainbow's End", a song by Mariah Carey from her album Rainbow, 1999
- "Rainbow's End", a song by Sérgio Mendes from his self-titled album, 1983
- "Rainbows End", a song by Modern English from Ricochet Days, 1984

== Other uses ==
- Rainbow's End (theme park), an amusement park in Auckland, New Zealand
- Rainbows End, New Zealand, a rural settlement in Auckland, New Zealand

== See also ==
- Rainbow Ends, a 2016 album by Emitt Rhodes
