= Love's Lovely Counterfeit =

1942 novel by James M. Cain

Love’s Lovely Counterfeit
- Cover of the first edition
- Author: James M. Cain
- Language: English
- Genre: Hardboiled novel
- Publisher: Alfred A. Knopf
- Publication date: 1942
- Publication place: United States
- Media type: Print (hardcover and paperback)
- ISBN: 0-679-72323-4

Love's Lovely Counterfeit is a hard-boiled short novel by James M. Cain published by Alfred A. Knopf in 1942. The story is set in a Midwestern town where rival gangsters struggle to maintain control of their criminal enterprises. The work is one of only three of Cain's novels told from the third-person point-of-view.

The book was adapted to film by RKO-Benedict Bogeaus Productions in 1956, appearing as Slightly Scarlet.

== Plot summary ==
The story takes place in the Midwestern metropolis of Lake City, population 220,000. Ben Grace is chauffeur and factotum for racketeer Sol Caspar who controls the city government and presides over local gambling and prostitution. Ben is resentful of his exploitation by Sol and schemes to be more than a mere "chiseler." When a political reform party arises led by a local dairyman Jansen, Grace infiltrates the movement and enlists the support of reformer June Lyons to destroy Sol politically. June falls in love with Ben and, under his influence, betrays Jansen. Grace assumes control of the syndicate's illicit operations. Though cruel to June, Ben conducts his racketeering with a gentle touch. When June's evil sister Dorothy arrives, she betrays June by initiating a sexual liaison with Ben. Sol appears, and Dorothy kills him when he attempts to rape her. Ben and Dorothy plan to flee with Sol's hidden cache of money, but Ben is gunned down by the police. He marries Dorothy on his deathbed.

== Publication history ==
At the end of 1941, Cain was struggling to recover from a life-saving surgery for an ulcerated stomach . Financially in distress and hoping to cover his hospital bills, he embarked upon writing a story intended to serve both as a magazine serial and for Hollywood film adaptation. Love's Lovely Counterfeit is unique in that it is the only story "he ever wrote with a movie sale specifically in mind." Cain completed the work on December 6, 1941.

American publishers and film studios found that Love's Lovely Counterfeit of "the seamier side of city politics" lacked the patriotic wartime themes favored after the Japanese attack on Pearl Harbor and America's entry into World War II. Cain's agent failed to generate interest in the story. Following the success of a collection of Cain novellas, Three of a Kind published in 1941, Alfred A. Knopf reconsidered and paid Cain $1500 for Love's Lovely Counterfeit. The novel was released in 1942, despite its unflattering portrayal of corruption in the American heartland.

A film adaptation of Love’s Lovely Counterfeit, entitled Slightly Scarlet, would not appear until 1956. (See section #Film adaptation.)

== Critical appraisal ==
In writing Love’s Lovely Counterfeit, Cain deviated from the narrative point-of-view that characterized some of his most successful novels. Biographer Roy Hoopes observed that "The most characteristic aspect of Cain’s novels is the fact that they are all written in the first-person. Only three are not: Mildred Pierce, Love’s Lovely Counterfeit, and The Magician’s Wife." David Madden makes this critique:

Cain’s third-person novels seem to be periodic attempts to depart from [the first-person] mode that he knew was almost too easy for him…very little is distinguished about the style of Love's Lovely Counterfeit...[here] Cain most awkwardly indulges in the omniscience of the third-person narrator."

Ray Hoopes reports that Love's Lovely Counterfeit was widely panned by critics from The New York Times, The New Yorker and Time. The Saturday Review cautioned Cain that his reputation would suffer if he could not produce "a better book."

Critic N. L. Rothman compared Cain's Love's Lovely Counterfeit unfavorably to the immensely successful 1934 novel The Postman Always Rings Twice: a "hasty and overconfident production [lacking] the real pulsing vitality" of Cain's previous work. Knopf reported that by the end of 1942, the book had sold only 7,500 copies and the publisher "thought it was dead."

== Theme and Style ==
Love's Lovely Counterfeit demonstrates Cain's preoccupation with personal struggles among his male and female characters in contrast to the social and economic sources that underlay the political corruption he describes. Biographer David Madden points out that "Cain never deals directly with society's ills…his most effective social criticism emerges from his treatment of…character portrayal…it is the dramatic thrust of characters in action that intrigues him, and they add up to an impressive gallery of American public types." Literary critic Paul Skenazy writes:

One has only to compare Love's Lovely Counterfeit to Dashiell Hammett's novel Red Harvest, also about gang violence and corruption in a small town, to realize the very different minds and premises of these two writers. Cain is compelled by issues of power in the political sphere, particularly in the relationship between men and women; politics does not activate his imagination.

And as in virtually all of Cain's novels, the male protagonist is "doomed by his love and dependence" on women.

=== Point-of-View ===
Paul Skenazy notes that in the 1930s, Cain's work "became synonymous with a style of a short, intense, first-person narrative in which the male protagonist confesses his sins, allowing the reader to peek indiscreetly at his immoral life…reviews of Cain's work became more respectful with each subsequent publication." With Mildred Pierce and Love's Lovely Counterfeit in the early 1940s, Cain departed from his highly successful use of a first-person confessional mode to the more conventional third-person omniscient. Biographer David Madden writes:

The failures of Cain’s style are seen mainly in the third-person works, in which he is sometimes as bad as a writer can be… purple passages are rampant in his third-person novels, especially Love’s Lovely Counterfeit…Cain has more control over himself when he is pretending to be [his male protagonists] than when he is pretending, as in the third-person, to be a literary creator.

Love’s Lovely Counterfeit demonstrates "Cain’s "continuing problems with point of view, and his developing tendency to over-complicate his plots."

== Film adaptation ==
Though Cain had written Love's Lovely Counterfeit in 1941 with Hollywood in mind, the studios showed no interest. Cain later remarked, "I thought, and still think [it's] a slick plot for a movie." The story was published as a novel by Alfred A. Knopf in 1942.

Not until 1956 did RKO-Benedict Bogeaus Productions purchase Love's Lovely Counterfeit for $10,000 and released the film adaptation as Slightly Scarlet, starring John Payne, Rhonda Fleming and Arlene Dahl.

The story was adapted by screenwriter Robert Blees and directed by Alan Dwan. Biographer Roy Hoopes commented that Slightly Scarlett was "probably the worst picture with which Cain's name was ever associated."

Critic Bosley Crowther described Slightly Scarlet as "an exhausting lot of twaddle", but exonerated Cain by noting that any resemblance between the film adaptation and Love's Lovely Counterfeit was purely coincidental.

== Sources ==
- Cain, James M. 1989. Three by Cain: Serenade, Love’s Lovely Counterfeit, The Butterfly. Vintage Books. New York. ISBN 0-679-72323-4
- Hoopes, Roy. 1981. The Baby in the Icebox and Other Short Fiction by James M. Cain. Holt, Rinehart & Winston. New York. ISBN 0-03058501-5
- Hoopes, Roy. 1982. Cain. Holt, Rinehart, and Winston. New York. ISBN 0-03-049331-5
- Hoopes, Roy. 1986. Career in C Major and Other Fiction. McGraw-Hill Book Company. New York. ISBN 0-07-009593-0
- Madden, David. 1970. James M. Cain. Twayne Publishers, Inc. Library Catalog Card Number: 78-120011.
- Skenazy, Paul. 1989. James M. Cain. Continuum Publishing Company. New York. ISBN 0-8044-2821-2
