= The Butterfly (novel) =

Book by James M. Cain

- Cover of the first edition
- Author: James M. Cain
- Language: English
- Genre: Incest literature
- Publisher: Alfred A. Knopf
- Publication date: 1947
- Publication place: United States
- Media type: Print (hardcover and paperback)
- ISBN: 0-679-72323-4

The Butterfly is a hard-boiled novel by author James M. Cain published by Alfred A. Knopf in 1947. The story is set in rural West Virginia in the late 1930s and concerns a mystery surrounding an apparent case of father and daughter incest.

Though Cain was at the height of his literary success at the time of the novel's publication, the taboo subject of the tale precluded a Hollywood adaption. In 1982, the novel was adapted as a movie as Butterfly.

The Butterfly is among Cain's most commercially successful novels.

== Plot summary ==
During late 1930s West Virginia, Jess Tyler is a subsistence farmer who serves as an unofficial watchman over the abandoned Llewellyn coal mine that adjoins his property. A stern adherent to Christian fundamentalism, his wife Belle, of the local Morgan clan, deserted him years previously with their two young daughters, Jane and Kady, to live with the attractive ne’er-do-well and musician Moke Blue. Jess remains bitter and has no contact with his family.

One day, Jess arrives home to discover a pretty young woman on his doorstep. At first suspicious of her insouciance, the girl informs him that she is his youngest daughter Kady, now 19 years old. Unlike their illiterate mother, Kady and her sister have high school educations. Kady is the mother of an infant son, Danny, sired by her former lover Wash Blount, son of the wealthy mine owner. The elder Blounts have disowned Kady and the child because she is of the Tyler clan. Demoralized, Kady has in turn left the child with her mother and sister. She takes up residence at Jess's farm. Kady is determined to surrender herself to her carnal and acquisitive cravings.

Jess has disturbing sexual thoughts about Kady. Her flirtatious behavior troubles and excites him, and he takes to drinking. They embark upon an illegal business venture: distilling homemade whiskey and selling it to local taverns. Kady uses the money to buy fancy clothes. Jess, in a jealous rage, comes close to murdering a local mine guard who flirts with Kady and barely escapes imprisonment.

Kady is informed that Wash plans to defy his family and marry her. Jess discovers he has a grandson when his other daughter, Jane, arrives with Danny after Moke attempted to abscond with the child. The baby has a curious butterfly-shaped birthmark on its stomach. Jess and his daughters have a rapprochement, and he gives them his blessing to Wash and Danny.

Wash and Jess, believing that Moke had planned to harm the infant, capture him and prepare to deliver him to the authorities. Kady convinces them that Moke is harmless and he is released. Moke survives a mysterious nocturnal assault by the knife-wielding Belle, who collapses when her lungs hemorrhage. Dying, she declares her love for Jess and attempts to apologize to her former lover Moke. The funeral arrangements are made by Moke and his clan. The Tyler family, including Jess, are excluded at gunpoint.

On the wedding day for Kady and Wash, Jess secretly observes Moke at a sniper's perch, poised to ambush Jess as he travels to the ceremony. Jess eludes Moke but notes that the shirtless man has a butterfly-shaped birthmark near his navel. Jess concludes that Moke is Danny's father, and that Kady has concealed his parentage. Jess believes that Belle had tried to kill Moke so he wouldn't reveal the truth and ruin Kady's marriage. When Wash is informed of this by Jess, he swears to kill Moke, then relents and cancels the wedding.

Jess ambushes Moke and shoots him in the stomach. Mortally wounded, Moke confesses that Kady is a child he sired with Belle: Danny is therefore his grandchild. Jess casts the dying Moke into a mine shaft. Unaware as to why Wash abandoned her at the altar, Kady meets with Jess and they begin to drink and dance. Now knowing that he shares no kinship with Kady, he surrenders to his sexual compulsion for her, and she, distraught, complies. To satisfy Jess' moral concerns, they locate a clergyman and are married. Only Jess knows that the marriage is not incestuous. They spend two days at a motel making love.

The couple's co-habitation is discovered by Moke's brother, Ed, and he spreads the secret. To escape opprobrium, Jess agrees to help Kady, Jane and Danny relocate to another county. They are intercepted by deputy sheriffs who serve Jess with a warrant for incest. Jess pleads guilty so that Kady, a material witness, can be released from custody. She, in turn, divulges to the court that Jess is her husband. When she is charged with perjury, Jess reveals to the court–and to Kady–that she is not his daughter, identifying Moke's paternity. Jess reveals the secret of the "butterfly", and Ed is forced to exhibit his own birthmark, which matches that of his nephew, Danny. The charges against Jess and Kady are dropped.

Kady guesses that Jess murdered Moke. She abandons him to marry Wash, now reassured that Danny is his biological son. After their departure, Jess discovers that his firearms are missing. Ed and his clan surround the property. Jess, besieged in his cabin, keeps a journal. He descends into madness, hallucinating that he encounters Moke alive in the mine shaft. His final journal entry reads "I'm cut off. Ed Blue is out there and…"

== Publication background ==
The evolution of Cain's The Butterfly spans over two decades, beginning with his first visit to West Virginia in 1922 at age 30, where he acquired knowledge for two elements that appear in the novel: "moonshining and [coal] mines."

Cain's idea for a novel addressing incest had initially occurred to him while driving in the mountains north of the San Fernando Valley of California in the early 1930s. He had a flat tire, which was fixed by an immigrant family from West Virginia, and Cain and his companion speculated that their infant daughter might be a product of incest by her father. The device of a birthmark had already occurred to him, and he planned to title the work The Butterfly.

Cain did not begin writing the novel until 1938 or 1939, shortly after completing Serenade, the style and structure which The Butterfly resembles. In February 1939, Cain was on a road trip from Baltimore to Hollywood and visited West Virginia to collect material for his novel.

As early as the 1930s, Cain was aware that a plot involving incest would create a crisis for his publisher, Alfred A. Knopf. Playwright Thornton Wilder warned Cain that portraying an uncle who has sexual relations with a niece was within the novelist's domain, but an incestuous relationship between a father and daughter would be literary poison: "I wouldn't do it if I were you." When Cain took up the novel again in 1945, he made an adjustment to the plot: The father sleeps with the illegitimate daughter of his wife's lover, and not his own biological offspring.

After dozens of attempts to establish a satisfactory story line without success, and plagued by illness due to an ulcerated stomach, Cain suspended work on The Butterfly. When he resumed writing, Cain shifted his efforts to another literary project, a work in the third person that would become his 1941 novel Mildred Pierce. After completing Past All Dishonor in August 1945, Cain returned to finishing a draft for The Butterfly. On a road trip cross-country from Baltimore in late 1945, Cain revisited West Virginia. According to biographer Roy Hoopes, Cain "wanted to spend some time in Appalachia to make sure the flavor of the mountain people for The Butterfly was still accurate [since his 1939 visit] and that his facts were solid."

Cain's wife Aileen Pringle exhorted him to persist in writing the work, despite a topic that might open an unwelcome discussion on a taboo, perhaps leading to suspicions regarding Cain's sexual proclivities. Cain's sister Genevieve "Baben" Cain, herself a novelist, urged Cain to destroy a draft of The Butterfly after reading it: "...forget you ever wrote it...you're going to live to regret [its publication]." Her reaction was so negative that Cain had "second thoughts about the novel." Cain's first full manuscript for The Butterfly drew criticism from Knopf copy editor Bernard Smith who found the work "disappointing, and was confused by the ending." Cain provided satisfactory changes to the novel's ending.

Alfred A. Knopf delayed the release of The Butterfly so as not to compete with Cain's recently published, and immensely successful Past All Dishonor. With galleys underway to make 30,000 hard-cover copies of The Butterfly, Alfred A. Knopf Sr. who admitted reading the book carefully "without feeling in any way outraged" warned Cain to anticipate negative reactions among critics.

I think I ought, as your friend and publisher, to tell you that there may be breakers ahead. A surprising number of people in the book trade really dislike the book intensely - think it shocking, that it oversteps the line of what is permissible to deal with in fiction…...Of course, incest is the ugly word...Don't misunderstand me; I certainly don't expect legal trouble of any kind, but I am prepared, and I want you to be prepared, for possible unpleasant talk in print and out, and a considerable amount of sales resistance…"

== Critical appraisal ==
The Butterfly had a polarizing effect among contemporary critics, in which "reviewers were either violently pro or con" the novel. As to the promised "explosive" treatment of incest, the Chicago Sun reported that "the whole book is a phony scare" and Time remarked that The Butterfly was "about as incestuous as Tarzan of the Apes." The majority of the mainstream press, among them New York Herald Tribune, the San Francisco Chronicle, the Philadelphia Inquirer, the Chicago Tribune published favorable assessments. The 12-page preface elicited as much comment as the novel itself. Biographer Roy Hoopes notes:

The publication of The Butterfly and Past All Dishonor, back to back, brought Cain to the height of his reputation as a novelist who specialized in shocking his readers. Books sold well, with The Butterfly achieving Cain's second-highest hard-cover total - 45,000 copies.

Hoopes adds that, by the time The Butterfly was completed, Cain "was probably the most reprinted author in the country- over one and a half million of his books had been sold…in hard-cover and paperback editions…" Subsequent biographers and reviewers remain divided over the virtues of The Butterfly. David Madden ranks Cain's novel among "the cream of our twentieth century fiction" along with The Postman Always Rings Twice, Serenade and Mildred Pierce.

Critic Albert Van Norstrand considers The Butterfly the most psychologically complex of his literary works and his finest application of the first-person confessional point-of-view. Critic Paul Skenazy offers this criticism:

The Butterfly is not Cain at his best. Although it is far superior to the works he wrote after Mildred Pierce, it is riddled with contradictions and simplifications of motive. The novel is a brutal story that views people either as animals, or through a maudlin lenses of sentimentality…by turning the problem of incest into an issue of biology, Cain manages to keep on the discreet edge of pornography while permitting himself to offer all the thrills and frills of a written description of the real thing…

Skenazy adds that The Butterfly "transfers seduction from the male and father to the [female] child. This ploy reverses the actualities of most incest situations and turns the event into a male fantasy of the resistant father….urged into sin by his passionate daughter."

== Style and theme ==
"The Butterfly confirms the way that Cain himself is a victim of, as much as a writer who profits from, the stereotypical forms of social understanding and visions of gender that dominate the American mind."—Literary critic Paul Skenazy in James M. Cain (1989).

The opening of The Butterfly is typical of Cain's use of a "narrative hook" in his novels written from the confessional first-person point-of-view.:

She was sitting on the stoop when I came in from the fields, her suitcase beside her and one foot on the other knee, where she was shaking a shoe out that seemed to have sand in it. When she saw me she laughed, and I felt my face get hot, that she had caught me looking at her…

Literary critic Paul Skenazy observes that "however manipulative the device can at times seem, the confessional mode is essential to the success of…The Butterfly." By adopting the confessional voice for protagonist and narrator Jess Tyler, Cain avoids the "judgmental" and "principled" voice inherent in a third-person narrative and "opens himself to the power and intensity of repressed and unconscious material…The Butterfly is both raw and sentimental, engrossing and demeaning." The theme of incest appears in two Cain books: The Butterfly and the unpublished "Kingdom by the Sea", dealing with a relationship between a mother and her son.

The biological aspect of the inheritance of traits, both physically and in personal character, are illustrated in the brown "butterfly mark" that appears in males of the Morgan clan. Biographer David Madden identifies the birthmark as "a sign of evil; it focuses the mystery of progeny which causes several murders."

Cain reveals his stance towards religion in the character of Jess Tyler. Morris Markey remarked to Cain that "the psalm-singing [Tyler] never once thought of calling upon the Lord when his catastrophe closed in on him." David Madden observes that in the Butterfly "Cain depicts ways in which sex and religious emotions are often confused in Fundementalist sects. For such people as [protagonist] Jess Tyler, sex has to be sanctified by religion, and religion has to be invigorated by undertones of sex." Religion of any faith "is a source of concern, anger and terror" for Cain's characters.

=== Preface to The Butterfly ===
At the height of his commercial and critical success with his recently published Past All Dishonor, Cain wrote a 12-page preface to The Butterfly. Less a discussion of the novel and more a polemic, the preface served as a reckoning with Cain's critics regarding his image and reputation among his readership. Contrary to the Alfred A. Knopf's reservations about including the piece, the preface was widely praised and generated sympathy from both critics and fans.

The preface is wide-ranging in topics. He touches on the antecedents to The Butterfly, then moves to disputing his categorization as a "hard-boiled" author and dismisses comparisons to Dashiell Hammett. Cain contrasts his writing with that of Ernest Hemingway and denies its influence on his work, while acknowledging Hemingway's superiority as a writer. Cain recognized the "legendary successes" of a number of his novels adapted to film, but admits his failure as a Hollywood screenwriter. Though Cain admired filmmaking on a technical level, he writes:

Motion pictures simply do not excite me intellectually, or in whatever way one has to get excited to put exciting stuff on paper. I know their technique as exhaustively as anybody knows it, I study it, but I don't feel it…

Cain was especially vehement in denying charges that his novels were conceived "in projection rooms" or the characterization of his literary work as "movietone realism." He closes his preface with a defense of his historical and research for Past All Dishonor and his verification of regional accuracy that informs his fictional characters in The Butterfly.

== Adaptation ==
In 1982, the novel was adapted into a movie by director Matt Cimber, starring Stacy Keach as Jess Tyler and Pia Zadora as Kady, as well as Orson Welles in the role of Judge Rauch. It was intended as a star vehicle for actress Pia Zadora, but the film was critically panned and received 10 nominations at the 1982 Golden Raspberry Awards, winning 3, including Worst Actress for Zadora.

== Sources ==
- Cain, James M. 1989. Three by Cain: Serenade, Love's Lovely Counterfeit, The Butterfly. Vintage Books. New York. ISBN 0-679-72323-4
- Hoopes, Roy. 1982. Cain. Holt, Rinehart and Winston. New York. ISBN 0-03-049331-5
- Hoopes, Roy. 1986. Career in C Major and Other Fiction. McGraw-Hill Book Company. New York. ISBN 0-07-009593-0
- Madden, David. 1970. James M. Cain. Twayne Publishers, Inc. Library Catalog Card Number: 78-120011.
- Skenazy, Paul. 1989. James M. Cain. Continuum Publishing Company. New York. ISBN 0-8044-2821-2
