= The Postman Always Rings Twice (play) =

1936 play

The Postman Always Rings Twice is a play by James M. Cain, based on his best-selling 1934 novel The Postman Always Rings Twice. The work was first performed at the Lyceum Theatre in New York City in 1936. The play saw a brief revival in 1953.

== 1936 production ==
=== Cast ===
- Richard Barthelmess as Frank Chambers
- Mary Philips as Nora Papadakis
- Joseph Greenwald as Nick Papadaki

=== Production background ===
The sensational impact of Cain's novel spurred Metro-Goldwyn-Mayer to acquire film and dramatic rights to The Postman Always Rings Twice. In 1935, Cain delivered a theatrical adaptation of his novel to New York's Theatre Guild who had obtained an option on the work from M-G-M. The Theatre Guild required that Cain be on-call to make revisions during rehearsals. Months passed before Cain was informed that, according to his book publisher, Alfred A. Knopf, the Guild had "definitely abandoned any plan to do the play this season..."

By November 1935, producer Jack Curtis Sr. announced that the work would be staged as soon as possible. Cain arrived in New York for what he would describe as "a dreadful experience from beginning to end". Biographer David Madden reports that Postman "was given a full-scale Broadway production, with a massive set, designed by Jo Meilziner (in the year of his famous designs for Winterset and Dead End)..." He adds that "the play required ten scene changes; there were two outdoor scenes with real [automobiles]". Working closely with director Robert B. Sinclair, Caib wrote and rewrote scenes until finally providing the cast with a script "stuck together with adhesive tape, string, wire, and chewing gum". The play premiered on February 25, 1936, at the Lyceum Theatre.

=== Critical reception ===
Performances were well received by audiences, but reviewers found the subject matter repellent. The chilling tale of a drifter and an unfaithful wife conspiring to kill her husband was deemed "subversive" by the The Sun, and The New York Times found the characters "loathsome". Theatre critic Burns Mantle listed it in his Best Plays of 1935–1936, with this caveat: "This is the type of play that whatever its technical perfections is pretty sure to miss popularity, for the simple reason...that it is hard to write an appealing story about repellant humans". The play was not considered a success and closed after 73 performances. Cain lamented "...I should never have written the play at all. If you tell a story once you have no business rewarming it".

== 1953 production ==
=== Cast ===
- Tom Neal as Frank Chambers
- Barbara Payton as Nora Papadakis

=== Production background ===
With the success of the 1946 film adaption of The Postman Always Rings Twice and the outstanding performance by John Garfield, Cain considered bringing the play back in a summer stock production with Garfield in the leading role. Cain's agent Harold Norling Swanson solicited the return of the dramatic rights to the play from M-G-M, to which they consented, with the understanding the production would appear by May 1954.

Shortly after Cain embarked on the project, John Garfield died. Cain recovered from the setback when he joined with Garfield's film director on Postman Joseph Bernard, and together they proceeded with the revival.

The cast was selected by Bernard and producer Clifford Hayman. Film and Broadway actor Tom Neal played Frank and Barbara Payton, a former model who had appeared opposite James Cagney, Gregory Peck and Gary Cooper in Hollywood films played Nora. Though "box office attractions", neither of their fulsome performances did justice to the play, The production opened in Pittsburgh, Pennsylvania, and went on the road, appearing briefly in Chicago, and St. Louis, then closed.

=== Critical reception ===
The 1953 production was widely disparaged by critics, with most of its failure attributed to the performances of the "notorious Hollywood lovers" Neal and Payton. Receiving "only an occasional favorable review". Claudia Cassidy wrote in the Chicago Tribune: "the crude dramatization suggests that if the theatre is isn't dead, somebody ought to arrange a mercy killing" and Variety declared Cain a "pedestrian playwright".

== Sources ==
- Hoopes, Roy. 1981. The Baby in the Icebox and Other Short Fiction by James M. Cain. Holt, Rinehart & Winston. New York. ISBN 0-03058501-5
- Hoopes, Roy. 1982. Cain. Holt, Rinehart and Winston. New York. ISBN 0-03-049331-5
- Madden, David. 1970. James M. Cain. Twayne Publishers, Inc. Library Catalog Card Number: 78-120011.
- Skenazy, Paul. 1989. James M. Cain. Continuum Publishing Company. New York. ISBN 0-8044-2821-2
