= Rainbow's End (Cain novel) =

Crime novel by American writer James M. Cain

Rainbow’s End
- Cover of the first edition
- Author: James M. Cain
- Language: English
- Genre: Crime fiction
- Publisher: Mason-Charter
- Publication date: 1975
- Publication place: United States
- Media type: Print (hardcover and paperback)
- ISBN: 978-0425030547

Rainbow’s End is a crime novel by American writer James M. Cain published in 1975 by Mason-Charter publishers, with an introduction by Tom Wolfe

Rainbow’s End returns to themes he explored in Cain's 1947 novel The Butterfly, including apparent incest. Cain wrote Rainbow’s End amidst the upsurge of interest in his early work following the publication of the anthology Cain X 3 (1969).

== Plot summary ==
The story opens with an airline hijacking by a thief possessing $100,000 of stolen cash. He parachutes from the plane, taking a female flight attendant, Jill Kreeger, as a hostage. The pair descend on a remote island on Muskingum River near Marietta, Ohio. They encounter two backcountry subsistence farmers, a young mother and her 15-year son, Dave Howells. After the boy quickly dispatches the thief/kidnapper, the stewardess and he vie to locate the illicit cash.

Apparent incest and jealousy plague relationships, though Howell is not, in fact, the biological offspring of his “mother.” The cash is ultimately recovered, and Dave and Jill bond in love with the blessings of “mother.”

== Publication history ==
The seed for Rainbow’s End emerged from a sensational robbery and hijacking in 1971. Cain traveled to the small town of Marietta, Ohio to collect material for the novel. His interview with the Marietta Times outlining the story was communicated to Mason-Charter publishing executive Thomas Lipscomb. He and Cain agreed on a two-book contract at $7,500 per book. Cain delivered a manuscript in Cain agreed to make significant edits to Rainbow’s End, but his refusal to abandon the happy denouement led to a contretemps with Lipscomb, who preferred a “down beat” ending, but acquiesced.

Rainbow’s End was published in late 1974. Mason-Charter was impressed with the hard-cover sales and Berkley Books issued it in paperback.

== Critical appraisal ==
Biographer Roy Hoopes reports that most reviewers were pleased with Cain’s return to a story of “mayhem and murder” in Rainbow’s End. Syndicated writer John Barkman lauded Cain’s return to “the same drive, the same energy, the lean hyped prose” that characterized his depression era novels, regretting only the “happy ending.” Charles Witteford of the Miami Herald discerned the “vintage Cain [in the] spare, tight style and the staccato dialogue.” The Boston Globe rejoiced that “Cain was alive and still writing at 83” and Richard Fuller at The Philadelphia Inquirer noted that the hard-boiled author had reclaimed “his old momentum” in Rainbow’s End. According to Hoopes, Cain’s “resurrection” “was now acknowledged nationwide.”

Literary critic Paul Skenazy writes that Rainbow’s End marks a return to Cain’s familiar themes of “incest, greed and desire” and proceeds with “more speed and energy” than his works of the 1950s and 1960s.

== Sources ==
- Hoopes, Roy. 1982. Cain. Holt, Rinehart and Winston. New York. ISBN 0-03-049331-5
- Skenazy, Paul. 1989. James M. Cain. Continuum Publishing Company. New York. ISBN 0-8044-2821-2
