= Pastorale (short story) =

Short story by James M. Cain

- Short story by James M. Cain
- Country: USA
- Language: English
- Genre: crime fiction

Publication
- Published in: The American Mercury
- Publication type: Periodical
- Publication date: March 1928

“Pastorale” is a short story written by James M. Cain and published in March, 1928 by editor H. L. Mencken in The American Mercury. Written in the Ring Lardner style, the tale is told in a first-person narrative, delivered in the dialect of a resident of rural America. Both the point-of-view and the use of colloquial dialect for his protagonists, fully established in “Pastorale”, would be applied in many of Cain’s novels.

Cain’s first published short story, "Pastorale” is distinguished from his earlier dialogues and sketches he had produced for The American Mercury since 1924. The story describes a gruesome small-town murder of an elderly married man by two local men, one of whom wishes to marry his young wife.

Biographer Roy Hoopes considers this early work “an extremely important event in Cain’s evolution as a writer of fiction…”

== Plot summary ==
The story opens with an unidentified narrator, a member of the rural village who relates the details of a gruesome incident in the local vernacular.

Burbie, a native of an unspecified small town, returns home at the age of 26 after working with traveling shows since a teenager. Now employed strictly as a day laborer, he haunts the pool halls and barber shops, presenting himself as world wise and distinctively superior to the local denizens. Barbie is a sharp dresser and well-groomed.

Burbie is drawn to Lida. During Burbie's sojourning, she had worked in a dry goods store. A well-dressed, attractive young woman, Lida enjoyed male companionship. She is now pregnant and married to a well-to-do man, much older than her, who lives outside of town. Burbie and Lida engage in trysts, a fact that the townspeople are well aware, of which Burbie makes no attempt to conceal. They conspire to murder Lida's husband, concerned that her spouse may have been alerted to their affair. They also feel pressure from the local Ku Klux Klan affiliate, who promote family values among whites.

Burbie enlists a local man, Hutch, who has a reputation for violence and cruelty, to assist him with the plot. Hutch is lured into the conspiracy to murder by the promise that the victim possesses a hidden treasure of hard cash. Lida is sent out of town to establish her innocence, and two men, drunk on corn liquor approach the old man’s home stealthily in a horse-drawn wagon. Begging sanctuary from the cold, Lida's husband invites them indoors, and Hutch crushes his skull with a wrench, killing him.

The hidden treasure turns out to be $23 in cash. Burbie attempts to placate the outraged Hutch. Fleeing the home with the corpse in the wagon, the men dismember the body, Hutch insisting that Burbie sever the head of the victim and present it as a gift to Lida. The headless body is hastedly buried. Hutch descends into madness, jumps into a creek and drowns. Burbie flees to his home. Local residents discover the remains of the murdered man. The deceased Hutch is assumed to be the murderer.

Weeks pass, and the local constable is skeptical about the case. Burbie's mental condition begins to deteriorate in public places due to his sense of guilt. He and Lida confess to their crime and are arrested. Burbie accepts Jesus as his personal savior while he awaits his imminent hanging.

== Style & Theme ==
Cain’s first short story was written in late 1927 when he was 36-years-old and published in The American Mercury in March 1928. Cain developed the story from an anecdote told to him by dime novel writer William Patten, recognizing its potential for a humorous treatment of a grisly event.

Cain had been writing dialogues and sketches for The American Mercury since 1924 under the auspices of journalist and satirist H. L. Mencken. Cain found his literary voice in “Pastorale” by writing in the first-person, conveyed in so-called “rube” speech, the colloquial vernacular of a member of the rural working class. Cain’s adoption of the “Ring Lardner style” allowed him to develop his literary inventions. Cain commented on his preference to write a story in the first-person:

The only way I can keep on track at all is to pretend to be somebody else—to put it in dialect and thus get it told. If I try to do it in my own language I find I have none...narratively, I do not exist, I have no impulse to hold an audience.

In “Pastorale”, Cain discovered his “favorite theme”, one that would appear in many subsequent works: the doctrine that when two people conspire in a murder, their sense of guilt leads them to suicide or confession of the crime. Biographer Paul Skenazy describes Cain’s theme development:

...Cain’s first published story ‘Pastorale’, is about a man who kills a woman’s husband to possess her, then confesses the crime. It is as if when Cain elaborates a more or less inoccuous situation, his imagination discovers another, more troubling and threatening set of possibilities within it, involving adultery and murder with suggestive incestual and Oeidipal overtones.”

== Sources ==
- Hoopes, Roy. 1981. The Baby in the Icebox and Other Short Fiction by James M. Cain. Holt, Rinehart & Winston. New York. ISBN 0-03058501-5
- Hoopes, Roy. 1982. Cain. Holt, Rinehart and Winston. New York. ISBN 0-03-049331-5
- Madden, David. 1970. James M. Cain. Twayne Publishers, Inc. Library Catalog Card Number: 78-120011.
- Skenazy, Paul. 1989. James M. Cain. Continuum Publishing Company. New York. ISBN 0-8044-2821-2
