= The Institute (Cain novel) =

1976 novel by American writer James M. Cain

- Cover of the first edition
- Author: James M. Cain
- Language: English
- Publisher: Mason-Charter
- Publication date: 1976
- Publication place: United States
- Media type: Print (hardcover)
- ISBN: 978-1453291573

The Institute is a novel by James M. Cain published in 1976 by Mason-Charter. The Institute is a story of academia and high finance set in the community of College Park, Maryland concerning members of the Washington, D. C. political establishment.

== Publication history ==
Cain completed a manuscript for The Institute in 1972. Alfred A. Knopf, Cain’s former publisher, rejected the work. wrote, “I can’t persuade myself that we should publish this and I’m terribly afraid no one else will either. Jim, alas has lived too long and can’t adapt his considerable gifts to today’s modes.” When informed that his dialogue was dated, Cain remarked, “I have to write as I write, and I can’t young it up.”

After multiple rejections for The Institute, Cain turned to writing Rainbow’s End. Mason-Charter publishers ultimately agreed to publish both novels. The Institute was the penultimate novel to appear during Cain’s lifetime; The Institute convinced reviewers that Cain’s talent for writing was virtually extinguished. John D. MacDonald writing for The Sunday Times Magazine concluded that The Institute was “a faint and embarrassing echo” of Cain’s former literary talents.

== Sources ==
- Hoopes, Roy. 1982. Cain. Holt, Rinehart, and Winston. New York. ISBN 0-03-049331-5
- Skenazy, Paul. 1989. James M. Cain. Continuum Publishing Company. New York. ISBN 0-8044-2821-2
