= Our Government (satirical dialogues) =

Satire on federal, state and local governments

Our Government. w/ dust cover. 2nd printing, 1930.

Our Government is a collection of satirical dialogues and sketches by James M. Cain published in 1930 by Alfred A. Knopf as part of The American Scene series. Our Government is the first of Cain's many books.

The collection presents a wide range of contemporary topics and stereotypes that satirizes federal, state and local governments, but with a limited narrative scope.

== Publication Background ==
In 1925 Cain emerged as a “humorist and a master of American dialect” in satiric pieces for The American Mercury that took the form of dialogues and sketches. Skilled in reproducing both urban and rural vernaculars, Cain was hired by New York World in 1928 to write a regular column of dialogues depicting working-class denizens of “Bender Street”, an imaginary New York City neighborhood. From 1929 to 1931, Cain wrote sketches concerning various characters and locales for the Mercury and the World that were widely read in New York, Publishers Houghton Mifflin and Alfred A. Knopf expressed interest in his work.

In 1930 Knopf assembled a collection of Cain's sketches for publication. Most of the pieces originally appeared in The American Mercury, but were retitled in the Knopf publication to comport with the government theme. Cain wrote four additional sketches for the book. His 1929 short story “The Taking of Montfaucon” based on his experience in France during World War I was also included.

The collection brought Cain to the attention of the Hollywood studios. He was hired as a screenwriter for Paramount Pictures, and in 1931 he left New York for California. Biographer David Madden comments on the overall effect of Our Government:

Almost without exception the dialogues exaggerate for satirical effect, so that public officials and members of the public who figure in them [appear] as irresponsible, self-deluded, moronic yokels. Given what Cain shows us, the miracle of democracy is that it works at all; but Cain’s final point is that it does work. The dialect and the colloquialisms are authentic and demonstrate his ability to listen carefully…if these dialogues fail to justify Cain’s claims, to demonstrate his intentions, and to instruct, they certainly entertain.

== Sources ==
- Hoopes, Roy. 1981. The Baby in the Icebox and Other Short Fiction by James M. Cain. Holt, Rinehart & Winston. New York. ISBN 0-03058501-5
- Hoopes, Roy. 1982. Cain. Holt, Rinehart and Winston. New York. ISBN 0-03-049331-5
- Madden, David. 1970. James M. Cain. Twayne Publishers, Inc. Library Catalog Card Number: 78-120011.
- Skenazy, Paul. 1989. James M. Cain. Continuum Publishing Company. New York. ISBN 0-8044-2821-2
