= The Root of His Evil =

1951 novel by James M. Cain

- Cover of the first edition
- Author: James M. Cain
- Language: English
- Genre: Hardboiled novel
- Publisher: Avon
- Publication date: 1951
- Publication place: United States
- Media type: Print (paperback)
- ISBN: 0887390870

The Root of His Evil is a novel by James M. Cain published in paperback by Avon in 1951.

Though Cain routinely employed the first-person narrative to tell his stories, The Root of His Evil is the only novel published in his lifetime in which Cain “writes through the voice of a woman.” (His 1941 novel Mildred Pierce is written in the third-person).

The work was originally written in the form of a serial entitled “A Modern Cinderella” in 1938, but was never purchased by any literary magazine.

The story was adapted to film by Universal Pictures in 1939 and released as When Tomorrow Comes, starring Irene Dunne and Charles Boyer in 1939. Another version, Interlude was released in 1957 and directed by Douglas Sirk.

In the late 1940s and early 1950s, Cain published three paperback fictions that involve divorce and provide upbeat endings. The Root of His Evil surpasses in quality his other two works: Sinful Woman (1947) and Jealous Woman (1950).

== Publication history ==
The 1951 Avon paperback edition entitled The Root of His Evil had its origins in an exchange between Cain and Collier’s literary editor Kenneth Littauer in 1938. Littaurer suggested that Cain write a contemporary version of the fairytale Cinderella, famously recorded by the Brothers Grimm. The original drafts were titled “A Modern Cinderella” while Cain was developing the narrative in the late 1930s.

“Union organizing is a convenient plot device that in the end reveals Cain’s suspicion of collective effort and his interest in issues of individual will, power and competition.” - Literary critic Paul Skenazy in James M. Cain (1989)

Written at a period of widespread labor unrest in the later years of the Great Depression, the story features a conflict between a millionaire industrialist and a union organizer, serving as a backdrop for Cain’s central theme: the struggle of a young woman to achieve control over her personal and professional life in a man’s world. Cain’s literary posture towards labor unions, largely informed by his commitment to individualism, belies his positive descriptions of collective struggle in the story.

Cain completed “A Modern Cinderella” in November 1938, dictating the work to stenographer Sarah Goodwin, his only story recorded in this manner.

Despite his high expectations for the serial, the major magazines in the country declined to purchase it. Cain had been cautioned by his spouse Elina Tyszecka that unflattering portrayals of organized labor and its leadership would hurt prospects for the sale of work in an era of high union membership. Even after Cain made a number of revisions, “A Modern Cinderella” was never published by any literary journal.

The fortunes for Cain’s work changed abruptly when his agent James Geller sold the property to Universal Pictures for $17,500 that same month.

Not until 1951 did Cain see his work published in print, when Avon press agreed to offer it in paperback as a novel, with the title changed to The Root of His Evil.

== Structure and theme ==
Cain’s female protagonist, Carrie Selden, presents an “interesting variation” on the leading character in his 1941 novel Mildred Pierce. Significantly, Cain tells her story through the voice of Carrie, distinguishing it from his third-person portrayal of Mildred Pierce.

Like protagonist Mildred Pierce, Carrie Selden rises from waitress to that of a high-functioning entrepreneur with tremendous business acumen. In this sphere, she surpasses her husband and his male associates. Literary critic and novelist David Madden observes: “Both are waitresses for a time, both have weak husbands and are pursued by seemingly strong lovers. They are forced, because of male weakness or insufficiency, to make good in the male world, even to best the man.” Cain’s “Cinderella” bears some resemblance to the Carrie Meeber in Theodore Dreiser’s Sister Carrie (1900)—the identical name was not accidental—in their mutual desire for wealth and recognition. David Madden comments on the fairy tale theme:

“Cain makes us experience the Cinderella wish. Many waitresses and other working girls desire to marry a millionaire prince. But that’s a dream; real millionaires have ordinary human problems. In The Root of His Evil, Carrie gets not only the millionaire but his problems as well. Ironically, she does not consciously desire to be a Cinderella; chance thrusts her into a Cinderella situation. Her wish then becomes a desire to earn her own wealth to cancel out the ‘prince-like’ qualifications of the man she loves.”

Cain also introduces an Oedipal element into the story concerning the relationship between Grant and his mother, the still youthful Agnes, who exerts a powerful, quasi-sexual control over her son.

“For the third time in Cain’s corpus, service (waitressing, and wearing a uniform) is equated with servitude (an association in The Postman Always Rings Twice and Mildred Pierce) and seems to indicate that the attitude has less to do with the character’s social standards…than with Cain’s own peculiar prejudices.”—Literary critic Paul Skenazy in James M. Cain (1989)

The “evil” in the book’s title is a reference to Grant’s thralldom to his mother, a spell that is broken by Carrie, when she emerges victorious in a vicious verbal combat with Grant’s mother over which woman will possess Grant. Liberated from his mother, Grant shifts his loyalty to Carrie, his “redeemer.” Paul Skenazy writes:

The attitudes of power and love in the novel are disturbing. Manhood can only be demonstrated in struggle, feelings of love can only be recognized in the rage that accompanies jealousy…the majority of the novel is about Carrie’s efforts to avenge herself on Agnes rather than the relationship between Grant and Carrie.”

== Film adaption: When Tomorrow Comes (1939) ==
“A Modern Cinderella” was adapted to film in 1939 by Universal Pictures and released as When Tomorrow Comes

When screen star Irene Dunne was selected to play protagonist Carrie Selden, the actress insisted that she play opposite Charles Boyer. Cain commented that Boyer, who often played sophisticated European lovers, was ill-suited for the role of the Harvard WASP Grant Harris. Universal altered the story to make the male protagonist a concert pianist. Dunne’s contract also stipulated that she sing at least one song in the picture. Cain, who had endeavored to become an opera singer in his youth, remarked that this was satisfactory, because if his heroine Carrie had been a vocalist “she would have had a voice about as bad as Miss Dunne’s.”

The screenplay proved to be challenging for the director John M. Stahl, who conferred with the author. Cain sympathized with Stahl, acknowledging that “making that guy [Grant Harris] into a hero was more than I could do after plenty of time of trying.” Screenwriter Dwight Taylor, who wrote the final script for the picture, approached Cain as well, reporting that he was having unspecified conflicts with Stahl. When Tomorrow Comes opened at the Pantages Theatre in August 1939. Cain, who was in attendance, recognized immediately that the film had virtually nothing in common with his original story. One notable scene, however, did resemble a sensational episode from Cain’s 1937 novel Serenade, which depicts a sexual encounter in a Catholic church during a sub-tropical rainstorm in Mexico.

Cain reluctantly initiated a plagiarism lawsuit against Universal that would work its way through the courts over the next three years. In 1942, the court ruled that the similarity between the literary scene in Serenade and the cinematic scene in When Tomorrow Comes were not self-evident. Cain, doubting the validity of his own case after hearing the testimony, declined to appeal.

== Sources ==
- Hoopes, Roy. 1982. Cain. Holt, Rinehart and Winston. New York. ISBN 0-03-049331-5
- Madden, David. 1970. James M. Cain. Twayne Publishers, Inc. Library Catalog Card Number: 78-120011.
- Skenazy, Paul. 1989. James M. Cain. Continuum Publishing Company. New York. ISBN 0-8044-2821-2
