= Cain X 3 =

1969 novel by James M. Cain

- Cover of the first edition
- Author: James M. Cain
- Language: English
- Genre: Hardboiled novel
- Publisher: Alfred A. Knopf
- Publication date: 1969
- Publication place: United States
- Media type: Print (hardcover and paperback)
- ISBN: 978-1299518889

Cain X 3 is a collection of three previously published novels by James M. Cain, reissued in 1969 by Alfred A. Knopf, with an introduction by Tom Wolfe.

Cain’s literary oeuvre had drifted into obscurity by the late 1960s, and as a novelist he was at his nadir. Then renewed interest in the hardboiled fiction of the 1930s by Dashiell Hammett and Raymond Chandler drew attention to Cain’s contributions to the genre.

Alfred A. Knopf publishers responded by offering this anthology of three of Cain’s most successful novels, Cain X 3: The Postman Always Rings Twice (1934), Double Indemnity (1936), and Mildred Pierce (1941). Enthusiasm for Cain’s early work persisted into the 1970s and 1980s.

== Critical Assessment ==
Literary critic Tom Wolfe’s fulsome praise for Cain in a 1962 review of author Norman Mailer‘s An American Dream (1965) prompted Knopf to include a laudatory introduction to Cain X 3 by Wolfe. Cain X 3 garnered effusive praise from the Time, The Nation, the San Francisco Chronicle, the Los Angeles Times, the Minneapolis Tribune and the Village Voice.

== Sources ==
- Hoopes, Roy. 1982. Cain. Holt, Rinehart and Winston. New York. ISBN 0-03-049331-5
- Skenazy, Paul. 1989. James M. Cain. Continuum Publishing Company. New York. ISBN 0-8044-2821-2
