= Galatea (novel) =

1953 novel by James M. Cain

- Cover of the first edition
- Author: James M. Cain
- Language: English
- Genre: Romance novel
- Publisher: Alfred A. Knopf
- Publication date: 1953
- Publication place: United States
- Media type: Print (hardcover)
- ISBN: 9788426412300

Galatea is a romance novel by James M. Cain published by Alfred A. Knopf in 1953. The story alludes to the mythological Galatea in which the sculptor Pygmalion falls in love with the ivory figure of a woman he has crafted. In Cain's modernized version of the Greek legend, an overweight woman is transfigured through a program of weight reduction into a goddess-like beauty.

Galatea marked the beginning of a sharp decline in the quality and quantity of Cain's literary output. He would not publish another work until his novel Mignon in 1963.

== Plot summary ==
Duke Webster, a young prize fighter turned trainer has a talent for helping his boxers achieve their competitive divisional weight. When he steals $86, a judge sentences him to work for a gentleman restaurateur, Val Valenty, to pay off the debt. Holly Hollis Valenty, Val's wife, suffers from morbid obesity. Val, who encourages her eating disorder, hopes the condition will kill her. Duke compassionately applies his skills to save Holly, but his intervention on Holly's behalf alarms Val. True to the legend, Holly is transfigured into a goddess-like beauty. Duke and Holly fall in love. The jealous Val dies in a failed attempt to murder the adulterous couple. They stand trial, accused of murdering him, but are exonerated after a protracted defense.

The couple move to Nevada and establish a weight-loss ranch.

== Publishing background ==
Cain's dwindling income in 1952 compelled him to write a novel "to bring in some quick money with a commercial success."

Suffering from dangerously high cholesterol, Cain was successfully treated by his physician through a special diet. During his treatment, Cain conceived a tale based on the mythological Galatea, but updated it so that the device that transforms the woman into an irresistible beauty is a weight reduction program.

At the request of his publisher Alfred A. Knopf, Cain retained the legend's happy ending, rather than the one in which "a man creates a woman, then compulsively kills her." Cain provided this alternate ending, in which the protagonists live happily ever after. Though Knopf considered Galatea "not up to your best in my opinion" he paid Cain $4,000 in advance for the work.

Galatea was never a best-seller, though it sold 14,000 hard-back copies by the end of 1952, and ultimately appeared in paperback. Film director Otto Preminger expressed interest in adapting the work, placing a $1000 option on the novel, but never acted on it.

Cain would not publish another novel for ten years.

== Themes ==
In Galatea, Cain employs his notable first-person narrative voice made famous in his novels of the 1930s, such as The Postman Always Rings Twice and Double Indemnity. The narrative form and framework are retained in Galatea, but the murderous and sexual compulsions that drive the early protagonists are absent. Biographer Paul Skenazy writes:

"Early in his career, Cain's achievement came from the stark, uncompromising, and unapologetic presentation of the absorbing power of the forbidden. He used violence to portray the thwarted ambitions of the characters who were his heroes…the cunning, ironic turns of fatality that Cain delivered could keep the most skeptical of readers fascinated by literary subjects or characters that he or she abhorred."

Skenazy adds that Galatea, and much of Cain's subsequent work, "features characters who are successful, well-educated, and come from established families, and show respect for the standards and proprieties of society."

"An atmosphere of evil—often pagan in mood and enhanced by superstition and a sense of the supernatural—broods over events in many of Cain's tales...In Galatea, the ghost of John Wilkes Booth walks when evil is about to be done. [Only] the impure of heart hear his spurs…this near-hokem is handled with technical subtlety."—Literary critic and novelist David Madden in James M. Cain (1970)

Holly Valenty is a descendent of the aristocratic Hollises of old Maryland. Her struggle to regain her natural body weight is a metaphor representing her determination to reclaim the "privilege, power and pride" proper to her station as a Hollis. As she sheds pounds, her "natural authority" emerges. Cain's characterization of Holly's victory, an "endorsement of aristocratic values", is in sharp contrast to his female protagonist Cora Papadakis in The Postman Always Rings Twice (1934).

Religious piety sustains the two lovers throughout Galatea. "God" is frequently evoked, and appears as the final word in the novel. Literary critic and novelist David Madden notes that "Both Duke and Holly are very conscious of God; Duke, like many Cain men, often prays…the name of God is on the lover's lips."

Paul Skenzy observes that the Duke and Holly, unlike their counterparts Frank and Cora in The Postman Always Rings Twice "are exempt from Cain's irony, and life's fatality".

== Sources ==
- Hoopes, Roy. 1982. Cain. Holt, Rinehart and Winston. New York. ISBN 0-03-049331-5
- Madden, David. 1970. James M. Cain. Twayne Publishers, Inc. Library Catalog Card Number: 78-120011.
- Skenazy, Paul. 1989. James M. Cain. Continuum Publishing Company. New York. ISBN 0-8044-2821-2
