= Cloud Nine (novel) =

1984 novel by James M. Cain

- Cover of the first edition
- Author: James M. Cain
- Language: English
- Genre: Hardboiled novel
- Publisher: Mysterious Press
- Publication date: 1984
- Publication place: United States
- Media type: Print (hardcover and paperback)
- ISBN: 978-0892960798

Cloud Nine is a hard-boiled detective novel by James M. Cain published in 1984 by Mysterious Press.

== Plot ==
Graham Kirby, raised since adolescence by his foster mother, the elderly yet attractive Jane Silbert, expects to inherit her property and make a fortune in real estate development. When Kirby’s younger half-brother Burl makes pregnant the sixteen-year-old Sonya Lang, Kirby marries the teenage girl to avoid a local scandal and to arrange for an abortion. Sonya miscarries, and Kirby discovers he is falling in love with her.

Unbeknownst to Kirby, his foster mother Jane is secretly attracted to him, and resents his marriage to Sonya. When Jane allows herself to be seduced by Burl, Sonya reveals to her mother-in-law Burl’s history of brutal and predatory sexual behavior, including suspicions that he is responsible for the death of a former lover. Burl retaliates, assaulting Kirby and threatening to rape Sonya; she kills him in self-defense. Kirby and Sonya bond through adversity, and embark upon a rosy future reconciled with the now doting Jane.

== Publication history ==
Editor William Koshland at Alfred A. Knopf, in rejecting the manuscript for Cloud Nine, wrote to Cain: “...I’m sorry, but I just can’t warm up to the book, the characters who people it, or the shenanigans through which you put them. It would make no sense for me to go into detail, Jim. I hate like hell to turn you down, but it’s gotta be.” Mysterious Press published the novel in 1984.

== Critical assessment ==
Literary critic Paul Skenazy comments on Cloud Nine:

Cain is ill-served by the book. This work is a lengthy justification of adult male desires for adolescent women and a confirmation of the mature male’s adequacy to a young female…it is all a bit pitiful and demeaning. Women, it is suggested, enjoy being raped and assaulted, so long as the right man does it.

== Sources ==
- Hoopes, Roy. 1982. Cain. Holt, Rinehart, and Winston. New York. ISBN 0-03-049331-5
- Skenazy, Paul. 1989. James M. Cain. Continuum Publishing Company. New York. ISBN 0-8044-2821-2
