= Paradise (essay) =

Magazine piece by James M. Cain

"Paradise" is a 1933 essay by novelist James M. Cain published in the March edition of H. L. Mencken's American Mercury. The non-fiction piece provides a first-hand portrait of Southern California during the Great Depression. Cain, an Easterner raised in Annapolis, Maryland, was a recent immigrant to the West Coast. The article presents his impressions of the geography, climate, architecture, cuisine and character of the most first and second-generation residents of the greater Los Angeles area. Cain's overall evaluation of the region and its prospects for the future are generally positive: "...when you come to consider the life that is encountered here, you have to admit that there is a great deal to be said for it".

== Critical assessment ==
"'Paradise' is probably one of the best descriptions of California in the 1930s ever written, as well as being—in Cain's opinion—the best article he ever wrote."—Roy Hoopes in Cain (1982)

"You can drive for miles, and the one thing you can be sure of is that you are not going to be rewarded for so much as one little scrap, one little unexpected bit, one hint of charm, that you can sit down with for a moment, and as I have said, take to bed with you at night, [merely] an endless succession of Rabbit Fryers, 50¢; Eggs, Guaranteed Fresh, 23 Doz.; Canary Birds, 50¢, Also Baby Chix Just Hatched; Car Mart, All Makes Used Cars, Lowest Prices; Orange Drink, 5¢; Eat; Drink Goat Milk for Health, Drive Right In…Finest English Walnuts, 15¢ Lb.; $100 Down Buys This Lot, Improvements Installed, No Assessments; Eat; Scotty Kennels, 100 Yds.; Pure Muscat Grape juice, 35¢ Gal., We Deliver."—James M. Cain from “Paradise” (1933).

Journalist and satirist H. L Mencken, to whom Cain submitted the essay for consideration in January 1933, declared it "the first really good article on depression era California that has ever been done." The American Mercury cover for the March 1933 issue assured readers that "Paradise" disclosed "What Southern California Is Really Like". Slow to be recognized as one of Cain's outstanding journalistic efforts, the work was judged a "masterpiece" by the New York Times's Richard Thomson in 1937.

Los Angeles Times literary critic David L. Ulin notes that "Paradise" had “slipped between the cracks” and remains a largely unknown work among Cain's ouvere. Ulin writes:

It's tempting to read the essay's title as ironic since Cain's fictional world—The Postman Always Rings Twice, Double Indemnity, and Mildred Pierce—is generally more of a paradise lost. But that's the beauty of the piece—that it not only undercuts our attitudes toward California but also our attitudes toward Cain.

Biographer Roy Hoopes notes that Cain's "ruthlessly honest" evaluation of California concludes that the Golden state had a promising future primarily because the place had been "populated by a selective process that had occurred in no other state...California migration brought people who were attracted to the climate and the geography after they had achieved a certain measure of success at home. What impressed Cain is that almost everyone in California felt 'some sort of destiny awaits this place' and it was going to be fascinating to see what happened.”

== Sources ==
- Cain, James M. 1933. “Paradise”. American Mercury, March 1933. https://www.latimes.com/books/la-xpm-2012-jan-01-la-ca-cain-essay-20120101-story.html
- Hoopes, Roy. 1982. Cain. Holt, Rinehart and Winston. New York. ISBN 0-03-049331-5
- Ulin, David. 2012. James M. Cain’s ‘Paradise’ is Prescient. Los Angeles Times, January 1, 2012. https://www.latimes.com/books/la-ca-david-ulin-20120101-story.html
