= Three of a Kind (novella collection) =

1943 novella collection by James M. Cain

- Cover of the first edition
- Author: James M. Cain
- Language: English
- Genre: Hardboiled novel collection
- Publisher: Alfred A. Knopf
- Publication date: 1943
- Publication place: United States
- Media type: Print (hardcover and paperback)

Three of a Kind is a collection of three novellas by James M. Cain, published by Alfred A. Knopf in 1943. Each originally appeared as serials in magazines during the 1930s. The collection includes Double Indemnity, first published in 1936 as a serial for Liberty magazine; Career in C Major, originally entitled "Two Can Sing" when it appeared in The American Magazine in 1938; and The Embezzler, appearing in Liberty as "Money and the Woman", also in 1938.

== Publication history ==
Following his enormously successful romance-crime novel The Postman Always Rings Twice in 1934, Cain sought to capitalize on the notoriety of the book by quickly writing serials for popular literary journals. With Liberty, Redbook and Collier's clamoring for more "commercial stories", Cain was less concerned with literary merit, and more with financial rewards. Despite this the stories included in Three of a Kind are representative of Cain's best literary output, in formed by the later years of the Great Depression. Cain acknowledged as much when he wrote in 1943 "These novels, thought written fairly recently, really belong to the Depression, rather than the war, and make interesting footnotes to that [earlier] era."

In a 1943 Time magazine review of Three of a Kind, a critic noted "the rancid air of authenticity which Cain obtains by screwing down his competent microscope on a drop of that social seepage which discharges daily into U. S. tabloids and criminal courts." Cain himself initially had a low opinion of Double Indemnity. In his preface to Three of a Kind, Cain complained that "I am probably the most misread, misreviewed and misunderstood novelist now writing…[I’ve made] no conscious effort to be tough, hard-boiled, grim, or any of the things I am usually called…"

In 1949, the American Library Association included Three of the Kind as among the most popular library books of the past 25 years, the only work of Cain's ourve to be honored in the collection.

== Film adaptations ==
When Three of a Kind appeared in print, Career in C Major and The Embezzler had already been purchased by film studios: Career in C Major was filmed in 1939 as Wife, Husband and Friend and in 1949 as Everybody Does It, both for 20th Century Studios.

Warner Brothers released its film adaptation of The Embezzler under its original serial title, Money and the Woman in 1940. Only Double Indemnity had not yet been obtained for film adaptation. All the major studios had rejected the scenario, a "blueprint for murder" concerning an adulterous pair who execute a cold-blooded killing for profit. Even Cain conceded it was "the most censorable story, if any story is censorable, that I ever wrote." When Cain's agent, Harold Norling Swanson, promoted Three of a Kind throughout the Hollywood establishment, Austrian-American film director-producer Billy Wilder insisted that Paramount Studios acquire the rights. Wilder made a highly regarded adaptation of the work under the same title in 1944. Detective fiction novelist Raymond Chandler co-wrote the script.

Cain's fame as literary figure is closely linked to the film adaption of Double Indemnity, as well as his Mildred Pierce and The Postman Always Rings Twice, each "credited with having had a significant impact on Hollywood’s approach to films." Double Indemnity was republished in a collection of Cain novels entitled Cain X 3 in 1968. The collection revived interest in Cain and his reputation as a writer of "American classics".

== Sources ==
- Hoopes, Roy. 1981. The Baby in the Icebox and Other Short Fiction by James M. Cain. Holt, Rinehart & Winston. New York. ISBN 0-03058501-5
- Hoopes, Roy. 1982. Cain. Holt, Rinehart and Winston. New York. ISBN 0-03-049331-5
- Hoopes, Roy. 1986. Career in C Major and Other Fiction. McGraw-Hill Book Company. New York. ISBN 0-07-009593-0
- Madden, David. 1970. James M. Cain. Twayne Publishers, Inc. Library Catalog Card Number: 78-120011.
- Marling, William. 2012. James M. Cain. https://web.archive.org/web/20140614121023/http://www.detnovel.com/Cain_James.html
- Skenazy, Paul. 1989. James M. Cain. Continuum Publishing Company. New York. ISBN 0-8044-2821-2
