= Past All Dishonor =

Historical novel by James M. Cain

- Cover of the first edition
- Author: James M. Cain
- Language: English
- Genre: Historical novel
- Publisher: Alfred A. Knopf
- Publication date: 1946
- Publication place: United States
- Media type: Print (hardcover and paperback)
- ISBN: 0877956510

Past All Dishonor is a historical novel by James M. Cain published by Alfred A. Knopf in 1946. The story is set during the American Civil War concerning a tragic love affair between a Confederate spy and a mining-camp prostitute in California and Nevada. The novel, praised by many critics, was one of Cain's most profitable literary successes.

== Plot summary ==
Past All Dishonor is set in US states of California and Nevada in 1863 at the height of the American Civil War. College educated Marylander Roger Duval is a pro-secessionist loyalist and spy deployed to Sacramento to collect routine intelligence on Union military mobilizations. An attractive youth, 21-years-of-age and over six feet tall, his clandestine assignment restricts him to his rented cabin on the banks of the Sacramento River. To amuse himself, he rows his skiff to a commercial paddle boat and dives off its deck for a swim. He is near to drowning when an attractive young woman, the 23-year-old Molina Crockett, a fellow Southron from Louisiana, rescues him and he quickly recovers in her stateroom. When Molina is accused by a female passenger of stealing a gold-filled purse, Duval spirits her away in his dingy. Now a fugitive from the law, Molina stays with Duval in his riverside cabin, spending several days making love with him. In his infatuation, Duval fails to grasp Molina's avocation: she is an inveterate and unrepentant prostitute. Molina is exasperated by the obtuseness of her young lover, and abandons him for the high-class gambling casinos to ply her trade among wealthy clientele. Duval pursues her and in a fit of jealousy, violently assaults one of her regulars johns. Molina, gratified, remarks: “I just love it that you hit him for me”. Duval persists in his naivete and proposes marriage to Morina. In despair, she flees from him to the silver mining center of the Comstock Lode at Silver City, Nevada.

Duval desperately seeks Molina in Sacramento, and there encounters a troupe of Mexican musical performers. The leader of the group “Paddy” (Padillo) assures Duval that Molina has gone to the boomtown of Silver City. Duval deserts his post in Sacramento to pursue her. Soon after arriving in Silver City, Duval spots Molina as she enters an exclusive pro-Confederate bordello operated by Madame Biloxi. Though he realizes now that she is “a thief and a whore”, he declares his love for her, and promises $1000 to her if she will marry him as a “business” proposition. Molina strips naked for the customers and performs a lewd sex act to repulse him, delighting the crowd. Duval flees from the brothel in shame.

Duval encounters Paddy again in Silver City. The musician is organizing Mexican mine laborers. When Paddy seeks to enlist Duval to help organize Anglo labor for a strike against the mining companies, he demurs at first. Realizing that a massive strike would impede the transfer of millions of dollars of gold and silver to the Union war effort, he finds employment in the silver mines and begins organizing workers. Operating underground, Duval discovers the horrifying conditions that the workers endure. He becomes committed a “ringleader” for the unionization of the mines. At a strike meeting, the foreman named Trapp assaults the laborers with a tamping iron and they retreat back to work. Abandoned by his comrades, Duval beats Trapp senseless with his fists. Mine supervisor Williams arrives and offers Duval the job of foreman, to replace the brutal Trapp. Disaffected from his co-workers, and with the opportunity to quickly earn the $1000 to procure Molina as his bride, he accepts. Betraying the workers to satisfy his selfish desires, Duval barely escapes several attempts on his life by his former allies.

Flush with his earnings, Duval sees Molina gambling with the wealthy George Brewer, now his courtesan. Duval risks his savings at the roulette wheel and wins more than $1000. He confronts Molina with her verbal contract to marriage as a legally binding agreement. She rejects him and departs. As Duval leaves the casino, he is assaulted by a gang of unionist miners who beat him severely in the street. His $1000 in coin are scattered and stolen. Duval purchases a pistol for self-defense and practices with it until he is a highly proficient marksman. A mine shaft cable is cut and kills a number of mine employees, sabotaging the operation of a rich silver lode. Duval, responsible for the action, blackmails the mine owner Hale, and is appointed supervisor. Duval uses his authority to fire his former union comrades and replaces them with compliant workers.

Duval survives another assassination attempt, but his hand is impaled in the attack. When gangrene sets in, the mine company surgeon orders the arm amputated. Duval violently resists the procedure, preferring to die. Suddenly, Molina appears and demands to treat Duval's wound. The doctor relents and she prepares a conjure salve made from rattlesnake venom. She saves his arm and they have a rapprochement. With his shooting arm restored, Duval becomes a hired gunslinger at one of Silver City's big casinos. When he proves his worth in wounding a drunken gunman, Duval becomes a local celebrity.

Duval discovers that the acquisitive Morina and the millionaire Brewer are preparing to marry. She informs Duval that she measures a man's love by the number of expensive gifts he bestows on her. Duval is dismayed at the source of her self-esteem. Alerted to a conspiracy to murder the pro-labor union George Brewer by Hale's hired gunman, Duval prepares to meet them. He observes that Brewer and his associates have entered the establishment and begin plying the customers with champagne. The assassins filter into the casino and open fire. Duval takes advantage of the melee to gun down his arch-rival Brewer, as well as the hired intruders. Duval is taken into custody, suspected of murdering Brewer, but he denies responsibility. Though he is exonerated by the grand jury, Brewer's brother, Raymond, publicly alludes to the rivalry over Molina. Madame Biloxi and Brewer's allies arrange to avenge the homicide. Duval is a marked man. To escape from Silver City, Duval enlists in the United States Army. When Molina returns from San Francisco and learns that Duval has killed Brewer, she pledges her love to him and renounces her vocation. Duval deserts the Union army and retreats with Molina to an abandoned mine. They discover that a derrick shaft contains a rich vein of silver.

In order to acquire funds necessary to purchase the mine, they make elaborate plans to hijack a train carrying a gold shipment to San Francisco and then to escape with the loot by horseback to Mexico. The hijacking goes awry when loyal train employees discover the plot and a gun battle ensues. Duval kills three men and he and Molina make a desperate escape with gold and valuable jewelry in their saddlebags just ahead of a mounted posse. Duval's homicidal rampage excites Molina: she praises him for providing them with “one more night” of love-making. As they flee, she exults in adorning herself in the stolen booty.

Alarmed when their pursuers close in on the couple, Duval mistakes Morina for a lawman and guns her down. He awaits his capture and ultimate demise.

== Publication background ==
Cain's first literary foray into the topic of corporate mining was his 1922 article for The Atlantic entitled “The Battle Ground of Coal.” The success of the piece inspired the 30-year-old Cain to travel to West Virginia to collect material for a novel he proposed to set in “mining country.” Cain worked for several weeks underground in the coal mines. Though no major literary work emerged, the experience informed his detailed handling of scenes dealing with silver mining operations and personnel in Past All Dishonor twenty years later.

In 1942, Cain, now almost 50-years-old, visited the historic mining town of Virginia City, Nevada. In search of material for a film script, Cain abandoned this to research a historical novel set in a mining town during the America Civil War. The story concerns the sordid fate of a Confederate spy and a prostitute during the town's heyday of the Comstock Lode. The denizens of the 1850s silver boom including “gunmen, gamblers, crooks and painted ladies” and the “whorehouses, railroads and saloons” they frequented were subjected to exhaustive research by Cain to produce a historically convincing description of the American West in the mid-19th Century. He spent “countless hours” at the Huntington Library and The Pony Express library collecting minutia on the era.

Cain wrote four versions dealing with the character development of the female protagonist Morina, before settling a plot where she is “a whore from the start”, fully aware that this scenario would compromise his efforts to see the work adapted to film. Past All Dishonor is the perfectly distilled presentation of the predominant theme in Cain's writing: “the wish that comes true and the horrors it brings to the wishers.” Despite this, Cain insisted on having the draft vetted for accuracy by specialists on many arcane topics related to California and Nevada history, including whether “riverboats had showers” in their staterooms during the Civil War period

When Alfred A. Knopf publishers received the work in August 1945 the reaction was enthusiastic. Anticipating lucrative sales from the book, Cain collected a $5,000 advance. Past All Dishonor “sold more hardbound copies than any of his other novels.”

== Critical appraisal ==
Cain was at the height of his popularity and fame when Past All Dishonor was released. Reviews were generally excellent: Newsweek dubbed the novel a “classic” and compared it favorably to Joseph Conrad’s novel Lord Jim. Praise was not uniformly positive. Cain was furious that a number of critics, among them John Parrelly of The New Republic, complained that his historical research was slipshod. Malcolm Cowley and Edmund Wilson lamented that Cain’s scenario pandered to Hollywood. Wilson’s criticism was especially galling to the author: "The characters talk straight post-Hemingway, full of phrases unknown in 1861…Cain has been eaten alive by the movies…”. Wilson added “Poor fellow, he is at his nadir. The worst is that he seems utterly unconscious of it.”

Biographer Paul Skenazy notes that the book “sold more hardbound copies than any of Cain’s other novels.”

== Sources ==
- Cain, James M. 1946. Past All Dishonor. Borzoi Books, Alfred A. Knopf. New York. 1946.
- Hoopes, Roy. 1981. The Baby in the Icebox and Other Short Fiction by James M. Cain. Holt, Rinehart & Winston. New York. ISBN 0-03058501-5
- Hoopes, Roy. 1982. Cain. Holt, Rinehart and Winston. New York. ISBN 0-03-049331-5
- Hoopes, Roy. 1986. Career in C Major and Other Fiction. McGraw-Hill Book Company. New York. ISBN 0-07-009593-0
- Madden, David. 1970. James M. Cain. Twayne Publishers, Inc. Library Catalog Card Number: 78-120011.
- Skenazy, Paul. 1989. James M. Cain. Continuum Publishing Company. New York. ISBN 0-8044-2821-2
