= She Made Her Bed =

1934 film by Ralph Murphy

- Theatrical release poster
- Directed by: Ralph Murphy
- Screenplay by: Casey Robinson; Frank R. Adams
- Based on: "Baby in the Ice-Box" (short story) by James M. Cain
- Produced by: Charles R. Rogers
- Starring: Richard Arlen; Sally Eilers; Robert Armstrong; Grace Bradley; Roscoe Ates; Charley Grapewin
- Cinematography: Milton R. Krasner
- Production company: Paramount Pictures
- Distributed by: Paramount Pictures
- Release date: March 9, 1934
- Running time: 71 minutes
- Country: United States
- Language: English

She Made Her Bed is a 1934 American pre-Code romantic drama film directed by Ralph Murphy and written by James M. Cain, Casey Robinson and Frank R. Adams. The film stars Richard Arlen, Sally Eilers, Robert Armstrong, Grace Bradley, Roscoe Ates and Charley Grapewin. It was released on March 9, 1934, by Paramount Pictures and was described at the time as a "social drama" film in which Arlen plays a "heroic villain."

== Plot ==
Philandering Duke Gordon and his wife Lura run a roadside coffee shop and auto park in rural Southern California. Frustrated over her husband's most recent affair, Lura strikes up a romantically tinged friendship with snake-oil salesman Wild Bill Smith, but this sours after Bill and Duke decide to purchase a Sumatran tiger as a special attraction for the Gordons' roadside establishment. Lura discovers she is pregnant—with Duke's baby—and attempts to repair things with her husband while asking Bill to leave.

A year later, both Bill and Eve (one of Duke's old flames) have come back to town, causing renewed friction. Meanwhile, the tiger escapes its enclosure. After coming face to face with the great cat in her kitchen, Lura hides her baby in the ice-box. Duke is attacked and killed by the tiger and a fire breaks out in the house. Lura is able to rescue her child, and the two of them join Bill on the road.

== Cast ==
- Richard Arlen as Wild Bill Smith
- Sally Eilers as Laura Gordon
- Robert Armstrong as 'Duke' Gordon
- Grace Bradley as Eve Richards
- Roscoe Ates as Santa Fe
- Charley Grapewin as Joe Olesen

== Release ==
Photoplay Magazine called She Made Her Bed "(a) gay merry-go-'round that makes for good entertainment." The film played on a double bill with Miss Fane's Baby Is Stolen in some theaters during its initial release.
