= James M. Cain =

American writer (1892–1977)

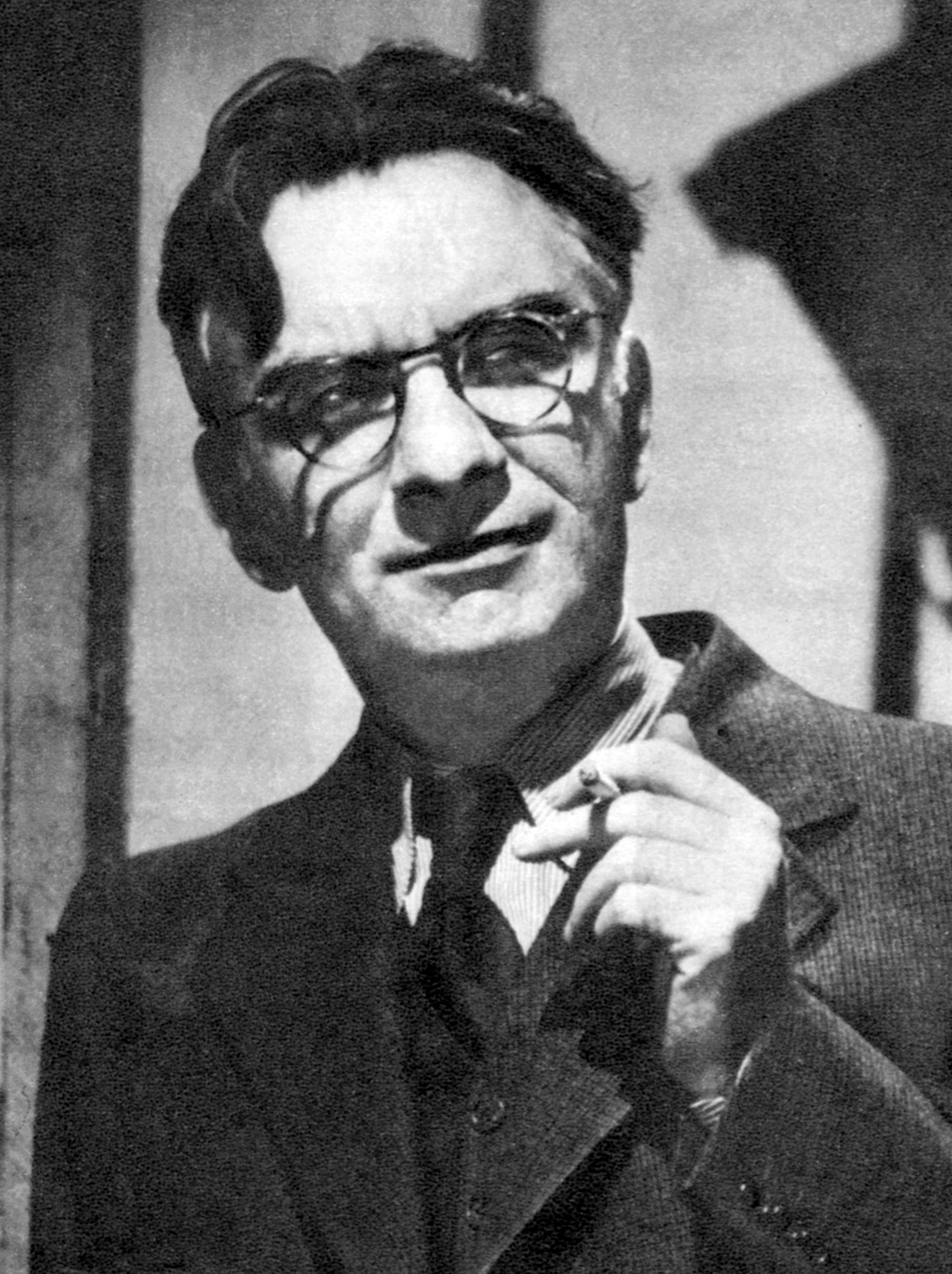
- Cain in 1938
- Born: James Mallahan Cain; July 1, 1892; Annapolis, Maryland, U.S.
- Died: October 27, 1977 (aged 85); University Park, Maryland, U.S.
- Education: Washington College
- Occupations: Novelist, journalist
- Writing career
- Genre: Crime

James Mallahan Cain (July 1, 1892 – October 27, 1977) was an American novelist, journalist and screenwriter. He is widely regarded as a progenitor of the hardboiled school of American crime fiction.

His novels The Postman Always Rings Twice (1934), Double Indemnity (1936), Serenade (1937), Mildred Pierce (1941) and The Butterfly (1947) brought him critical acclaim and an immense popular readership in America and abroad.

Though Cain never delivered a successful Hollywood screenplay, several of his novels were made into highly regarded films, among them Double Indemnity (1944), Mildred Pierce (1945) and The Postman Always Rings Twice (1946).

In 1970, Cain became one of the Edgar Awards' Grand Masters. He continued to write and publish novels into his eighties. A number of his works were issued posthumously, including The Cocktail Waitress (2012).

== Family background ==
Cain's paternal and maternal grandparents emigrated from Ireland and both families settled in New Haven, Connecticut during the early 1850s. Cain reported they were not agrarian refugees of the Great Famine of Ireland. His paternal grandfather P. W. Cain was an industrial worker who served as a superintendent for the Hartford Railroad. His wife, Mary (née Kelly), died in a typhoid fever outbreak in 1876. Cain's father, James W. "Jim" Cain, then 16 years-of-age, contracted but survived the illness. When P. W. Cain remarried, the disaffected Jim Cain gravitated to the home of the local Mallahan family, among whose daughters was Rose Mallahan, his future wife and mother to the famous author.

"I hated Ireland, hated every piece of it, hated everything it stood for."—James M. Cain, of Irish Catholic heritage, after his 1938 visit to Ireland at the age of 46.

The elder James W. Cain matriculated to Yale University in 1880 at the age of 20 and taught evening school to pay for his tuition. A consummate Yale man—"handsome, articulate, intelligent and athletic"—he graduated in 1884 and became a professor at St. John's College in Annapolis, Maryland.

Cain's maternal grandmother, Brigid Ingoldsby Mallahan, was a descendant of Irish pirate William Ingoldsby, who had captured and ravaged the English colonial city of New York in 1691. His mother, Rose Mallahan—"small, pretty and very distinguished-looking"—had trained for seven years in her youth as a coloratura soprano and expected to pursue a career in opera after giving recitals in New Haven. She gave up these musical aspirations to marry her girlhood sweetheart Jim Cain in 1890. She gave birth to the first of her five children on July 1, 1892: James Mallahan Cain.

== Early life ==
The six-year-old Cain entered grade school in Annapolis in 1898. An upbringing in a household with two highly literate parents contributed to the boy's "impeccable grammar" and his early enthusiasm for literature. Cain's father, then the head of the Annapolis School Board, indulged his son's request to skip two grades, from third to fifth. Though intellectually precocious, Cain later regretted the advancement, especially as his classmates entered puberty well ahead of him. The elder Cain's superior performance at St. John's College earned him the post of President of Washington College, at the time "a small non-denominational, co-educational school." In 1903, when Cain turned eleven, the family relocated to Chestertown, Maryland.

While living in Chestertown, Cain recalled encountering a garrulous bricklayer, Ike Newton, who introduced the young student to the "language of an uneducated but articulate person." Biographer Roy Hoopes traces Cain's fascination with common speech to this encounter, and compares it to the experiences of authors Jonathan Swift and Stephen Crane. Cain credited Newton's "vulgate" as instrumental to the development of his narrative style as a novelist. By the age of 12, Cain was a "voracious" reader and familiar with the literary works of Edgar Allan Poe, William Thackeray, James Fenimore Cooper, Alexandre Dumas, Arthur Conan Doyle, and Robert Louis Stevenson. Cain was granted permission to take preparatory classes at Washington College, where he took courses with youths four years his senior.

By the time Cain reached the age of 13, he had rejected the doctrines of the Catholic Church, especially the confessional, calling it "mumbo-jumbo." As an adult, according to biographer Roy Hoopes, "he came to regard the Church as one of the most ominous factors in all human history" and crafted his own independent view of "life and God." In Chestertown, Cain continued to sing in the church choir as a youth.

Though considered "one of the bright students on campus", his performance at the university was "erratic." Excelling in German and French language courses, his grades in Greek were mediocre; he passed his classes in "science, chemistry and Latin" but favored his coursework in history and literature. He also demonstrated an aptitude for mathematics, but found the topic unchallenging. Just before his eighteenth birthday, Cain took his Artium Baccalaureus degree. Upon graduation from Washington College, neither Cain nor his family had any plans for his career.

== Early employment: 1910–1917 ==
After moving to Baltimore to live independently, Cain engaged in desultory employment, working briefly as a ledger clerk for a public utility, then serving for two years as a road inspector for the State of Maryland. His clear and incisive reports on operations led Cain to contemplate a career in writing. In his late teens, he frequented local brothels with male friends (Cain reports that he did not sleep with the prostitutes) and had a number of affairs with older women.

In 1913 he accepted a job as principal of a high school in Vienna, Maryland, and while there enjoyed performing as a singer at community gatherings. When he informed his family that he wished to pursue a career as a professional operatic singer, his mother, a trained soprano, emphatically vetoed him: "You have no voice, no looks, no stage personality. Not one! You have some musical sense, but that is not enough." Undeterred, Cain—possessing only a "good, barroom bass"—moved to Washington, D.C., to enroll in a voice training course. To support himself he worked briefly in "office to office" insurance salesmanship for the General Accident Company but never sold a single policy.

After quitting a low-paying job as a Victrola salesman, Cain abandoned his hopes of becoming a professional singer and committed himself to becoming a writer, receiving his parents' blessings. Biographer Roy Hoopes notes that Cain's postgraduate period was not "misspent":

Almost everything Cain experienced in those four years of drifting around southern Maryland, Baltimore and Washington, D. C., played a part in his future fictional works; his frustrating job with insurance company contributed to Double Indemnity; construction work, which he learned about on the road commission, played an important role in his novels The Moth, Mignon, and Past All Dishonor; his brief music career contributed to his understanding of the singers in Serenade, Career in C Major, and Mildred Pierce; his Baltimore whorehouse nights were moved to Virginia City, Nevada, and put into Past All Dishonor, and his knowledge of southern Maryland and its people contributed background to his Galatea and The Magician's Wife. They may have been four aimless years for the young Cain, but they were not wasted.

Cain returned home to Chestertown in 1914 and was hired as an English instructor at Washington College, and there acquired a master's degree in drama. For years he made efforts to write fiction but without success. In 1917, at the age of 24, he was still living at home and as yet unpublished. He accepted a position as a math teacher in the autumn and registered for the draft when the United States entered World War I but was initially rejected for respiratory disorders.

== Career in journalism: 1917–1935 ==
The Baltimore American hired Cain as a cub reporter in the summer of 1917 and assigned him to a police unit. His first article, on a local drowning, so impressed the copy editor that Cain was instantly promoted to major assignments related to the war effort. Cain honored his commitment to serve as a math teacher but soon quit to return to journalism. He was hired by The Baltimore Sun in early 1918.

In June 1918, Cain, a skeptic of American war propaganda, was inducted into the Army and began basic training at Camp Meade, Maryland.

== Military service, Signal Corps: 1918–1919 ==
Cain sought and obtained assignment to a combat unit destined for action in France, the 79th Infantry Division, known as both the "Joan of Arc" and the "Lorraine Cross" Division. Private First Class Cain's unit was engaged in the summer of 1918, after the Battle of the Marne, in a major offensive action, the Meuse-Argonne campaign. Attached to headquarters, Cain manned observation posts. His efforts to establish battlefield contact with the 157th Infantry Brigade on September 26–27 became the basis for his 1929 short story "The Taking of Montfaucon." In late October, weeks before the end of the war, Cain barely survived a poison gas attack. Cain was assigned as editor-in-chief of the 157th's newsletter The Lorraine Cross. Alexander Woollcott, then a sergeant editing Stars and Stripes, called it "a snappy young journal." Cain was designated a publicity officer for the Division.

He was mustered out of the army on June 5, 1919, at Hoboken, New Jersey.

== Newspaperman: the Roaring Twenties ==
Cain resumed working for The Baltimore Sun, serving as a copy editor at $30 a week in the post-war period. At his own request, Cain was assigned to cover the industrial labor movement and its purported infiltration by Bolsheviks during the first Red Scare.

Cain married Mary Rebekah Clough, his college sweetheart, on January 17, 1920. They would separate in 1924 and divorce in 1927.

In early 1920, Cain became aware of the writing of the famed H. L. Mencken, editor of The Smart Set, "considered the most sophisticated magazine in the country at the time." According to biographer Roy Hoopes, his introduction to Mencken's writing was "the most important event of Cain's professional career ...Mencken's style almost intoxicated him..." Though Cain submitted essays to The Smart Set, none were approved. Cain, however, established a friendly correspondence with the editor.

In 1921, Cain covered the Bill Blizzard treason trial for the Sun in the aftermath of the Battle of Blair Mountain and the West Virginia coal mining labor struggles. Cain's highly acclaimed essay "The Battleground of Coal" was published as the lead article in The Atlantic in October 1922, followed by a similar article in The Nation. As an investigative journalist, Cain joined the United Mine Workers and served underground in a West Virginia coal mine, interviewing workers and management. His experiences there would inform two of his later novels: Past All Dishonor (1946) and The Butterfly (1947).

In 1923, Cain and his wife Mary moved to Annapolis, Maryland, where he began teaching courses in journalism and English at St. John's College.

== The American Mercury: 1924–1935 ==
H. L. Mencken enlisted Cain to contribute to his new literary journal The American Mercury launched in January 1924 with George Jean Nathan and Alfred A. Knopf Sr. Cain's association with this monthly journal would mark "the beginning of his reputation as a major magazine writer." As his professional and personal alliance with Mencken deepened, Cain quit his teaching job at St. John's and committed himself solely to writing after moving to New York City. Cain's subject matter was characterized by scurrilous and humorous attacks on "American types and institutions...the pastor, county officials, town commissioners, and the whole concept of do-gooding service..." His 1925 Mercury dialogue "The Hero" exemplifies this style of satirical writing.

Cain entered a sanitorium for treatment of tuberculosis and was successfully treated and released by September 1924.

Under Mencken's auspices, Cain was hired as the human-interest story editorial writer for the New York World by Walter Lippmann. Cain's highly literate, grammatically adroit, and entertaining pieces earned him a three-year contract at $125 a week at the World. Though exhorted to create "lighthearted pieces," Cain emerged as "one of the most prolific and respected editorial hands that ever worked for the World." Cain's last piece for the Mercury, titled "Close Harmony," appeared in October 1935.

"Cain's admiration of Walter Lippmann as a man, a writer, and, most important of all, as a literary stylist at times bordered on hero worship, and he lists Lippmann, along with Mencken, Philip Goodman and screenwriter Vincent Laurence, as the men who had the greatest influence on his life."—Roy Hoopes in Cain (1982)

Cain's preoccupation with writing a novel was stimulated by his immersion in the social and professional associations of the mid-1920s, a period which saw the publication of major literary works by F. Scott Fitzgerald, Theodore Dreiser, Willa Cather, Ernest Hemingway, Sinclair Lewis, Virginia Woolf, Ellen Glasgow, and Thomas Mann. Publisher and playwrights Philip Goodman and Vincent Laurence encouraged Cain to write a play about the evangelical Christian fundamentalism he had encountered during his reporting in West Virginia: Crashing the Gates opened in New England at Stamford and Worcester in February 1926 but closed after two weeks, receiving mixed reviews.

On July 2, 1927, Cain married Elina Tyszecki, a Finnish-American divorcee and mother of two children, after having had a lengthy affair. They would divorce in 1942.

=== "Pastorale" and the first-person confessional narrative ===
At the age of 36, Cain wrote his first short story, "Pastorale", a humorous treatment of a lurid tale of murder. Published in The American Mercury in 1928, this "Ring Lardner-style" work is considered by novelist David Madden his "best short story." The first-person narrative persona that Cain adopted in "Pastorale" reflects the handling of his newspaper editorials, in which he typically assumed the identity of a character not his own, confessing "I have no [literary] capacity to be Cain. I can't be Cain. I can be anybody except Cain", though recognizing his skill in the first-person. Critic Roy Hoopes writes:

Cain learned what he could do pretending to be someone else, [but] the problem now was to translate this ability into writing about the people in whom he was most interested: the average men and women one reads about in the tabloids, the people who committed crimes of passion, who were victimized by the system, and who lived their lives unconcerned about what was going on in Washington D. C. or the board rooms on Wall Street..."

In 1930, a collection of Cain's dramatic dialogues and sketches was published in Our Government by Alfred A. Knopf publishers.

=== The New Yorker: 1931 ===
When the New York World ceased publishing in 1931, Cain, on the recommendation of Morris Markey, was hired by Harold Ross to act as managing editor for The New Yorker. For nine months, Cain presided over the editorial staff, which included James Thurber, Katherine White, E. B. White, and Wolcott Gibbs. The journal published pieces by the outstanding literary figures of the early 1930s.

Cain's tempestuous relationship with Ross led to his departure in November 1931 when Cain's agent, James Geller, negotiated a contract as a screenwriter for Paramount Pictures at $400 a week.

== Novelist and screenwriter: Hollywood, 1931–1948 ==
Hired by Paramount while the studio was entering bankruptcy, Cain was assigned to work on a remake of Cecil B. DeMille's The Ten Commandments (1923) but was dropped from the project after criticizing his supervisor's story treatment. After working on a script about novelist Harvey Fergusson's Hot Saturday (1926), Cain was terminated by Paramount in May 1932, confirming his "basic dislike of [motion] pictures."

Unemployed in 1932, Cain looked to the Southern California milieu for a short story and wrote "The Baby in the Icebox," which H. L. Mencken published in American Mercury. The work caused "much excitement" and was widely republished in America and Europe. The story was adapted to film as She Made Her Bed (1934) by Paramount, though the studio declined to hire Cain to write the script. Cain's highly regarded non-fiction appraisal of the greater Los Angeles area, "Paradise," also appeared in the Mercury in 1933.

=== First-person chef-d'œuvres: 1934–1938 ===
Cain was engaged briefly by film producer Harry Cohn of Columbia Pictures as a screenwriter, but unable to produce a suitable script he was dismissed. For most of 1933, Cain was occupied writing the novel that would demonstrate a mastery of the first-person confessional that would make him famous: The Postman Always Rings Twice. With the support of Walter Lippman, Alfred A. Knopf publishers purchased the work, which became "an immediate critical and commercial success." A story of adultery and murder, "a small fable" according to Cain, his first novel has been reprinted in the millions since publication and "one of America's all-time best-sellers."

Two literary projects emerged from Postman: a play and a serial modeled after the story. Cain was determined to write a successful play after the failure of Crashing the Gate in 1926. Producer Jack Curtis Sr. bought the rights to the novel and director Robert B. Sinclair staged a theatrical adaptation of The Postman Always Rings Twice, opening in February 1936. Despite Cain's numerous revisions of the work, the reviews were largely negative and it closed after 73 performances.

Cain wrote a facsimile of Postman that published as a Liberty magazine serial in 1936: Double Indemnity, a love-murder conspiracy that unfolds in an insurance fraud. The serial was written "in exactly the same style as the Postman" and is considered one of Cain's "finest achievements." The popularity of the serial added millions to Liberty's readership and was published as a novella in 1943. The 1944 film adaptation directed by Billy Wilder is considered a masterpiece of film noir.

Cain's next literary project was 1938's Serenade, an opera-themed novel that addresses "the psychological sources of artistic power and creativity" and identifies heterosexuality as a sin qua non for success in the fine arts. Cain's handling of the "sensational" topic placed him at "the center of a literary tempest," sustaining his status as a much sought-after American author.

Cain made use of his knowledge of music, particularly opera, in at least five of his works: Serenade, about an American opera singer who loses his voice after a homosexual encounter and, after spending part of his life south of the border, re-enters the United States illegally with a Mexican prostitute; Mildred Pierce, in which, as part of the subplot, the surviving daughter of a successful businesswoman trains as an opera singer; Career in C Major, a short, semi-comic novel about the unhappy husband of an aspiring opera singer, who unexpectedly discovers that he has a better voice than she does; The Postman Always Rings Twice, in which the husband, Nick Papadakis, is a noted opera aficionado; and The Cocktail Waitress, in which a widowed waitress is offered money to remarry. In his novel The Moth, music is important in the life of the main character. Cain's fourth wife, Florence Macbeth, was a retired opera singer.

Cain spent many years in Hollywood working on screenplays, but his name appears as a screenwriter in the credits of only two films: Stand Up and Fight (1939) and Gypsy Wildcat (1944), for which he is one of three credited screenwriters. For Algiers (1938), Cain received a credit for "additional dialogue," and he had story credits for other films.

== American Authors' Authority ==
In 1946, Cain wrote four articles for Screen Writer magazine in which he proposed the creation of an "American Authors' Authority" to hold writers' copyrights and represent writers in contract negotiations and court disputes. This idea was dubbed the "Cain plan" in the media. The plan was denounced as communist by some writers, who formed the American Writers Association to oppose it. James T. Farrell was the foremost of these opponents. The Saturday Review printed a debate between Cain and Farrell in November 1946. Farrell argued that the commercial Hollywood writers would control the market and keep out independents. "This idea is stamped in the crude conceptions of the artist which Mr. Cain holds, the notion that the artist is a kind of idiot who thinks that he is a God, but who has only the defects and none of the virtues of a God." In his reply, Cain argued that his opponents understood the issue incorrectly as freedom versus control. It is fear of reprisals from publishers, Cain said, that is the real cause of opposition from well-to-do writers.

Although Cain worked vigorously to promote the Authority, it did not gain widespread support, and the plan was abandoned.

== Biography ==
In 1975, Roy Hoopes contacted Cain after reading his article in The Washington Post about Walter Lippmann. Hoopes conducted a series of interviews with Cain until Cain's death in 1977, which he turned into a biography of the author in 1984.

== Personal life ==
Cain was married to Mary Clough in 1919. That marriage ended in divorce, and he soon married Elina Sjösted Tyszecka. Cain never had any children of his own, but he was close to Elina's two children from a previous marriage. In 1944, Cain married the film actress Aileen Pringle, but the marriage was tempestuous and dissolved in a bitter divorce two years later. His fourth marriage to Florence Macbeth lasted until her death in 1966.

Cain continued writing up to his death in 1977 at the age of 85. He published many novels from the late 1940s onward but none achieved the financial and popular success of his earlier books.

== Published works ==
"I make no conscious effort to be tough, or hard-boiled, or grim, or any of the things I am usually called. I merely try to write as the character would write, and I never forget that the average man, from the fields, the streets, the bars, the offices, and even the gutters of his country, has acquired a vividness of speech that goes beyond anything I could invent, and that if I stick to this heritage, this logos of the American countryside, I shall attain a maximum of effectiveness with very little effort."

— Preface to Double Indemnity

=== Novels and novellas ===
- The Postman Always Rings Twice (1934)
- Serenade (1937)
- Two Can Sing (1938)
- Mildred Pierce (1941)
- Love's Lovely Counterfeit (1942)
- Three of a Kind (1943) contained three novellas - Career in C Major; Double Indemnity (first published in Liberty magazine, 1936); The Embezzler (first published as Money and the Woman, in Liberty magazine, 1938)
- Past All Dishonor (1946)
- The Butterfly (1947)
- The Moth (1948)
- Sinful Woman (1947)
- Jealous Woman (1950)
- The Root of His Evil (1951), also published as Shameless
- Galatea (1953)
- Mignon (1962)
- The Magician's Wife (1965)
- Cain X 3 (1969)
- Rainbow's End (1975)
- The Institute (1976)
- Cloud Nine (1984)
- The Enchanted Isle (1985)
- The Cocktail Waitress (edited by Charles Ardai, 2012)

The Postman Always Rings Twice was published as an Armed Services Edition during WWII, as was Three of a Kind. (The Armed Services Edition of Three of a Kind was published under the title Double Indemnity.)

The Postman Always Rings Twice, The Butterfly, Serenade, Mildred Pierce, and Double Indemnity were published in one volume as The Five Great Novels of James M. Cain by Picador in 1985.

=== Short story collections ===
- Our Government (1930)
- Career in C Major and Other Fiction (1986)
- The Baby in the Icebox (1981)
  - "The Baby in the Icebox"; "The Birthday Party"; "Brush Fire"; "Coal Black"; "Dead Man"; "The Girl in the Storm"; "Joy Ride to Glory"; "Pastorale"; "The Taking of Montfaucon". The British edition (Robert Hale, 1982) includes one more story, "The Embezzler".

=== Short fiction ===
- "Pastorale". The American Mercury, March 1928. Collected in The Baby in the Icebox.
- "The Taking of Montfaucon". The American Mercury, June 1929. Collected in The Baby in the Icebox.
- "The Baby in the Icebox". The American Mercury, January 1933. Collected in The Baby in the Icebox.
- "Dead Man". The American Mercury, March 1936. Collected in The Baby in the Icebox.
- "The Birthday Party". Ladies Home Journal, May 1936. Collected in The Baby in the Icebox.
- "Brush Fire". Liberty Magazine, December 5, 1936. Collected in The Baby in the Icebox.
- "Coal Black". Liberty Magazine, April 3, 1937. Collected in The Baby in the Icebox.
- "The Girl in the Storm". Liberty Magazine, January 6, 1940. Collected in The Baby in the Icebox.
- "Money and the Woman". Liberty Magazine, five installments published weekly from February 17 to March 16, 1940. Collected in The Baby in the Icebox as "The Embezzler".
- "Joy Ride to Glory". First publication details unknown. Collected in The Baby in the Icebox.

=== Plays ===
- Crashing the Gates (1926)
- The Postman Always Rings Twice (1936, 1953)
- 7-11 (1937)

=== Non-fiction ===
- "Paradise". Essay, The American Mercury, March 1933.

== Adaptations ==
=== Films ===
The following films were adapted from Cain's novels, screenplays and stories.

- Hot Saturday (1932), uncredited contribution to the script
- She Made Her Bed (U.S., 1934), directed by Ralph Murphy, based on the story "The Baby in the Icebox"
- Dr. Socrates (1935), uncredited contribution to the script
- Algiers (1938), screenplay
- Stand Up and Fight (1939), screenplay
- Wife, Husband and Friend (U.S., 1939), directed by Gregory Ratoff, based on the story "Two Can Sing" (also known as "Career in C Major")
- Le Dernier tournant (France, 1939), directed by Pierre Chenal, based on the novel The Postman Always Rings Twice
- When Tomorrow Comes (The Modern Cinderella in some publicity material) (U.S., 1939), directed by John M. Stahl, based on the novel The Root of His Evil
- Money and the Woman (1940), based on his magazine serial "The Embezzler", published in Three of a Kind
- The Shanghai Gesture (1941), uncredited contribution to the script
- Ossessione (Italy, 1943), directed by Luchino Visconti, based on the novel The Postman Always Rings Twice (uncredited)
- The Bridge of San Luis Rey (1943), uncredited contribution to the script
- Double Indemnity (U.S., 1944), directed by Billy Wilder, based on the magazine serial included in Three of a Kind
- Gypsy Wildcat (U.S., 1944), an original script
- Mildred Pierce (U.S., 1945), directed by Michael Curtiz
- The Postman Always Rings Twice (U.S., 1946), directed by Tay Garnett
- Out of the Past (1947), directed by Jacques Tourneur, based on the Daniel Mainwaring (writing as Geoffrey Homes) novel "Build My Gallows High". Script by Mainwaring with uncredited revisions from Cain and Frank Fenton
- Everybody Does It (U.S., 1949), directed by Edmund Goulding, based on the story "Two Can Sing" (also known as "Career in C Major"), remake of Wife, Husband and Friend
- Slightly Scarlet (U.S., 1956), directed by Allan Dwan, based on the novel Love's Lovely Counterfeit
- Serenade (U.S, 1956), directed by Anthony Mann
- Interlude (U.S., 1957), directed by Douglas Sirk, based on the novel The Root of His Evil
- Interlude (U.S., 1968), directed by Kevin Billington
- The Postman Always Rings Twice (U.S., 1981), directed by Bob Rafelson
- Butterfly (U.S., 1982), directed by Matt Cimber
- Girl in the Cadillac (U.S., 1995), directed by Lucas Platt, based on the novel The Enchanted Isle
- Szenvedély (Hungary, 1997), directed by Fehér György, based on the novel The Postman Always Rings Twice
- Jerichow (Germany, 2008), directed by Christian Petzold, based on the novel The Postman Always Rings Twice

=== Television ===
- Double Indemnity (1973), TV film based on the novel
- Mildred Pierce (U.S., 2011), HBO miniseries directed by Todd Haynes

== Sources ==
- Hoopes, Roy. 1981. The Baby in the Icebox and Other Short Fiction by James M. Cain. Holt, Rinehart & Winston. New York. ISBN 0-03058501-5
- Hoopes, Roy. 1982. Cain. Holt, Rinehart and Winston. New York. ISBN 0-03-049331-5
- Madden, David. 1970. James M. Cain. Twayne Publishers, Inc. Library Catalog Card Number: 78-120011.
- Skenazy, Paul. 1989. James M. Cain. Continuum Publishing Company. New York. ISBN 0-8044-2821-2
- Madden, David & Mecholsky, Kristopher (2011). James M. Cain: Hard-Boiled Mythmaker, Scarecrow Press, Inc. ISBN 0-8108-8118-7
