= Roy Hoopes =

American journalist (1922–2009)

Roy Hoopes (May 17, 1922 – December 8, 2009) was an American journalist, writer, and biographer who wrote the official biographies of James M. Cain and Ralph Ingersoll.

Roy Hoopes was born on May 17, 1922, in Salt Lake City, Utah, to Roy and Lydia Hoopes. After active duty in WWII in the Naval Reserves, he attended George Washington University in Washington, D.C., completing his A.B. in 1943 and M.A. in 1948. He worked as a writer and editor for various magazines in D.C., including The Washingtonian, Path-finder, High Fidelity, Democratic Digest Playboy, and National Geographic. From 1957-1977 he also had a weekly newspaper column for the Berkshire Eagle under the false name Peter Potomac. He was a member of the Oral History Association and the National Press Club.

Hoopes wrote and co-wrote over 30 works of fiction and non-fiction. His most notable works include his biographies of James M. Cain, for which he won the Edgar Award in 1984, and Ralph Ingersoll, he also wrote novels and nonfiction about the Peace Corps, the steel industry, politics, sports, and Hollywood.

Roy Hoopes died of pneumonia on December 8, 2009, at age 87.

== Selected published works ==
- Cain: The Biography of James M. Cain (1982) ISBN 978-0809313617
- Ralph Ingersoll: A Biography (1985) ISBN 978-0689115547
- The Steel Crisis: 72 Hours That Shook the Nation (1963)
- Political Campaigning (1979) ISBN 9780531028582
- The Peace Corps Experience (1968)
- The Presidency: A Question of Power (with Erwin C. Hargrove)
- A Report on Fallout in Your Food (1962)
- Everything You Need to Know about Building the Custom Home: How to Be Your Own General Contractor (with John Folds) (1990) ISBN 978-0878336531
- A Watergate Tape (2001) ISBN 0-312-87899-0
- When the Stars Went to War: Hollywood and WWII (1994) ISBN 9780679414230
- Paralegal Careers (with William Fry)
- The Making of a Mormon Apostle: The Story of Rudger Clawson (1990) ISBN 978-0819172983
- Our Man in Washington (2000) ISBN 9780312868499
- Americans Remember the Homefront (2002) ISBN 9780425186640

== Selected edited works ==
- Career in C Major and Other Fiction (1986) ISBN 0070095930
- The Baby in the Icebox and Other Short Fiction (1981) ISBN 0140070559
- The Life and Hard Times of the Late, Great Peter Potomac
- Wit from Overseas (1953)
