= The Postman Always Rings Twice =

The Postman Always Rings Twice may mean:

- The Postman Always Rings Twice (novel), a 1934 crime novel by James M. Cain
  - The Postman Always Rings Twice (play), his play (1936) based on the novel
  - The Postman Always Rings Twice (1946 film), a drama-film noir based on the novel
  - The Postman Always Rings Twice (1981 film), a drama based on the novel
  - The Postman Always Rings Twice (opera), a 1982 opera based on the novel
