= It's Always Sunny in Philadelphia season 14 =

2019 season of American television series

It's Always Sunny in Philadelphia
- Season 14
- Promotional poster
- Starring: Charlie Day; Glenn Howerton; Rob McElhenney; Kaitlin Olson; Danny DeVito
- No. of episodes: 10

Release
- Original network: FXX
- Original release: September 25 – November 20, 2019

Season chronology
- ← Previous; Season 13 Next → Season 15

The fourteenth season of the American television sitcom series It's Always Sunny in Philadelphia premiered on FXX on September 25, 2019. The season consists of 10 episodes and concluded on November 20, 2019.

== Cast ==
=== Main cast ===
- Charlie Day as Charlie Kelly
- Glenn Howerton as Dennis Reynolds
- Rob McElhenney as Mac
- Kaitlin Olson as Deandra "Dee" Reynolds
- Danny DeVito as Frank Reynolds

=== Recurring cast ===
- David Hornsby as Cricket

=== Guest stars ===
- Britt Lower as Lisa
- Timm Sharp as Greg
- David Agranov as Nikki
- Alexander Leeb as Alexi
- Dolph Lundgren as Thundergun
- Jessy Hodges as Moderator
- Emily C. Chang as Dr. Ling
- Carlin James as Max
- Winston Story as Nurse
- Mercedes Colon as Council Woman
- Michael Naughton as The Waiter
- Eve Sigall as Waiter's Mom
- Shaw Jones as Zoo Worker
- Mary Elizabeth Ellis as The Waitress
- Wass Stevens as Vince
- Gilberto Ortiz as Teen Boy
- Atticus Todd as Big Strange Dude
- Jessica Collins as Jackie Denardo
- Christine Horn as Cop
- Andrée Vermeulen as Vet
- Lilan Bowden as Sara
- Chad L. Coleman as Z

== Production ==
On April 1, 2016, the series was renewed for a thirteenth and fourteenth season, which tied it with The Adventures of Ozzie and Harriet as the longest-running (in number of seasons) live-action sitcom in American television history. Filming for the season began on June 13, 2019. Glenn Howerton made his directorial debut, directing the first two produced episodes of the season.

== Episodes ==
No. overall	No. in season	Title	Directed by	Written by	Original release date	Prod. code	US viewers (millions)
145	1	"The Gang Gets Romantic"	Glenn Howerton	Rob McElhenney & Charlie Day	September 25, 2019	XIP14001	0.481
Dennis and Mac house a couple whose marriage may be on the skids through an Airbnb ad; while Charlie and Frank advertise for young European female backpackers to crash at their house, but get two Austrian guys.
146	2	"Thunder Gun 4: Maximum Cool"	Heath Cullens	Conor Galvin	October 2, 2019	XIP14006	0.317
The gang participates in a focus group for a screening of Thunder Gun 4: Maximum Cool and each has their own take on what's wrong with the film—and American filmmaking at large.
147	3	"Dee Day"	Pete Chatmon	Megan Ganz	October 9, 2019	XIP14010	0.308
Frank, Charlie, Dennis, and Mac's greatest scheme ever gets derailed when Dee announces that it's Dee Day (similar to "Mac Day," but this time it's Dee forcing the Gang to do what she wants).
148	4	"The Gang Chokes"	Glenn Howerton	John Howell Harris	October 16, 2019	XIP14002	0.296
Frank nearly chokes to death while out to dinner and a waiter saves his life; angry that the Gang didn't care enough to save him, Frank begins stalking The Waiter; meanwhile, Dennis becomes preoccupied with his health and Dee becomes an adrenaline junkie.
149	5	"The Gang Texts"	Tim Roche	Rob McElhenney & Charlie Day	October 23, 2019	XIP14004	0.259
During a day at The Philadelphia Zoo (filmed at the Old Los Angeles Zoo), The Gang tries to keep connected by group texting.
150	6	"The Janitor Always Mops Twice"	Heath Cullens	Megan Ganz	October 30, 2019	XIP14005	0.248
In this send-up of film-noir mysteries, Charlie navigates Philadelphia's seedy underbelly to discover how Frank got diarrhea.
151	7	"The Gang Solves Global Warming"	Pete Chatmon	Rob McElhenney & Charlie Day	November 6, 2019	XIP14008	0.261
The gang tries to profit off global warming by running their air conditioning at the bar so people will come to Paddy's.
152	8	"Paddy's Has a Jumper"	Kimberly McCullough	Dannah Phirman & Danielle Schneider	November 13, 2019	XIP14003	0.314
When a suicidal man threatens to jump off Paddy's Pub, the Gang wonders whether they should help him or keep watching the Downton Abbey-esque British drama they're hooked on and let him fall to his death.
153	9	"A Woman's Right to Chop"	Pete Chatmon	Dannah Phirman & Danielle Schneider	November 20, 2019	XIP14009	0.268
Women frequenting a trendy new salon prompt Dennis and Frank to fight against a woman's right to get her hair done. Meanwhile, Mac reunites with his childhood dog and must decide whether to have him put down.
154	10	"Waiting for Big Mo"	Pete Chatmon	David Hornsby	November 20, 2019	XIP14007	0.236
In this spoof of Waiting for Godot, Dennis and Charlie stand guard at their laser-tag base waiting to ambush their enemy, Big Mo, but everyone (except Dennis) wonders why they play laser-tag and what the victory is worth.

== Reception ==
The fourteenth season received positive reviews. On Rotten Tomatoes, it has an approval rating of 83% with an average score of 7.6 out of 10 based on 12 reviews. The website's critical consensus is, "Always Sunny's provocative humor has lost some bite, but the patrons of Paddy's Pub ought to be pleased by the Gang's inability to cope with modernity – and each other.
