= Corinne Luchaire =

French actress (1921–1950)

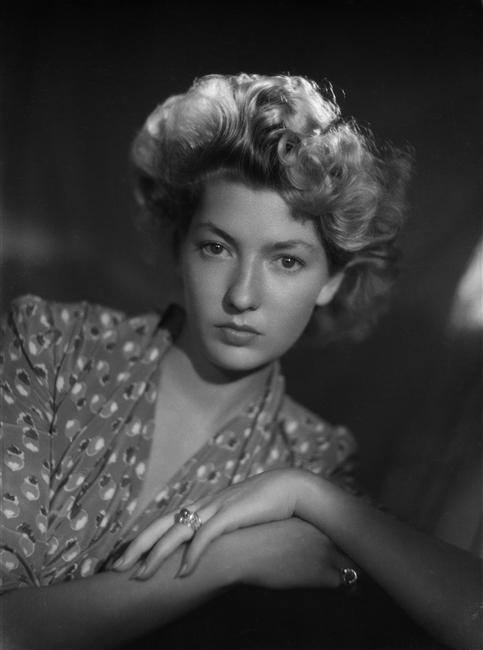
- Luchaire in 1943
- Born: Rosita Christiane Yvette Luchaire; 11 February 1921; Paris, France
- Died: 22 January 1950 (aged 28); Paris, France
- Years active: 1935–1940
- Spouse: Guy de Voisins-Lavernière
- Father: Jean Luchaire

Corinne Luchaire (11 February 1921 – 22 January 1950) was a French film actress who was a star of French cinema on the eve of World War II. Her association with the German occupation led her to be sentenced to "national indignity" after the war, and after writing an autobiography, she died from tuberculosis at age 28.

== Acting ==
Luchaire left school to join the drama class of Raymond Rouleau and made her acting debut under the name Rose Davel at the age of 16 in a play written by her grandfather, Julien Luchaire, Altitude 3 200. The following year she starred in Prison sans barreaux, which in 1938 was remade in English in London as Prison Without Bars, with her again in the lead role. She spoke English fluently. Mary Pickford called her "the new Garbo." She starred in 1939 in Le Dernier Tournant (The Last Bend), the first version of the novel The Postman Always Rings Twice.

== Personal life ==
Born Rosita Christiane Yvette Luchaire in Paris, she was the daughter of journalist and politician Jean Luchaire, who supported the 1940 French Government's Révolution nationale. Her paternal grandfather Julien Luchaire was a playwright and her maternal grandfather Albert Besnard was a painter. Her sister Florence was also an actress. Her mother, also a painter, became Gustav Stresemann's mistress, and they moved to Germany with Corinne.

Corinne charmed Stresemann's friend Kurt von Schröder, who let her live in his mansion. Corinne grew up around the Nazis who frequently visited the banker Schröder at his home. There, she met Otto Abetz, the future German ambassador to Paris, who married her father's secretary, Suzanne, who until 1939 had been his mistress. She accompanied her father to Vichy Paris in August 1940. Corinne was briefly married to a French aristocrat, Guy de Voisins-Lavernière.

She became a well-known, piquant French actress, and she benefited during the Occupation from the political and social position of her father, the editor of Les Temps Nouveaux, and Toute la vie. She was frequently ill (tuberculosis), and she stopped acting in 1940. Notwithstanding this, it was said that for her Paris under the German occupation had been just one continuous round of champagne parties, receptions at the German Embassy, and German dinner parties chez Maxim's.

Immediately after D-Day in June 1944 Corinne, along with other collaborationists, started the then very hazardous train journey to Germany. This slow journey eventually was halted by wrecked lines and she transferred to cars provided to take them to the Sigmaringen enclave. It is said that at some point she attempted suicide. She and her father, latterly Minister of Information in the French Government, then escaped to Merano in Italy, but they were arrested in May 1945 and imprisoned at Fresnes. She spent several months in jail in Nice, and was sentenced to ten years of dégradation nationale by a tribunal in June 1946. Her father, condemned to death for treason, was executed in February 1946.

In 1949, Luchaire published her autobiography, titled Ma drôle de vie (My peculiar life), about her stardom and the German occupation. The book was criticised as being naive and failing to analyse her role in the Nazi occupation. She never ceased to defend her father, who to her was a martyr "who had never wanted to harm anyone, who was sincere, and who had never thought unkindly of any man."

She died on 22 January 1950 at the Clinique Médicale Edouard Rist in Paris. She is buried at the Cimetière de Bagneux dans les Hauts-de-Seine.

== Filmography ==
- Les Beaux jours (1935, by Marc Allégret) as Minor Role (uncredited)
- Le Chanteur de minuit (1937) as Minor Role (uncredited)
- Prison sans barreaux (1938, by Léonide Moguy) as Nelly
- Prison Without Bars (1938) as Suzanne
- Conflict (1938, by Léonide Moguy) as Claire
- Le Dernier Tournant (aka The Last Turning) (1939, by Pierre Chenal) as Cora Marino
- Le Déserteur (1939) as Marie
- Cavalcade d'amour (1940) (aka Love Cavalcade) as Junie
- Abandonment (1940, by Mario Mattoli) as Anna
