= The Postman Always Rings Twice (1981 film) =

1981 film by Bob Rafelson

- Theatrical release poster
- Directed by: Bob Rafelson
- Screenplay by: David Mamet
- Based on: The Postman Always Rings Twice by James M. Cain
- Produced by: Bob Rafelson; Charles Mulvehill
- Starring: Jack Nicholson; Jessica Lange
- Cinematography: Sven Nykvist
- Edited by: Graeme Clifford
- Music by: Michael Small
- Production companies: Lorimar Productions; Northstar International; Metro-Goldwyn-Mayer
- Distributed by: Paramount Pictures
- Release date: March 20, 1981
- Running time: 121 minutes
- Country: United States
- Language: English
- Budget: $12 million
- Box office: $44.2 million

The Postman Always Rings Twice is a 1981 American neo-noir erotic thriller film directed by Bob Rafelson and written by David Mamet (in his screenwriting debut). Starring Jack Nicholson and Jessica Lange, it is the fourth adaptation of the 1934 novel by James M. Cain. The film was shot in Santa Barbara, California.

== Plot ==
In 1934 Frank Chambers, a drifter, stops for a meal at a diner outside Depression-era Los Angeles and ends up working there. The diner is operated by a young, beautiful woman, Cora Smith, and her much older husband, Nick Papadakis, a hardworking but unimaginative immigrant from Greece.

Frank and Cora begin an affair soon after they meet. Cora is tired of her situation, married to an older man she does not love and working at a diner that she wishes to own and improve. She and Frank scheme to murder Nick to start a new life together without her losing the diner. Their first attempt at the murder is a failure, but they succeed with their second attempt.

The local prosecutor suspects what has actually occurred but does not have enough evidence to prove it. As a tactic intended to get Cora and Frank to turn on one another, he tries only Cora for the crime. Although they do turn on each other, a clever ploy from Cora's lawyer, Katz, prevents her full confession from coming into the hands of the prosecutor. With the tactic having failed to generate any new evidence for the prosecution, Cora benefits from a deal in which she pleads guilty to manslaughter and is sentenced to probation.

Months later, Frank has an affair with Madge Gorland while Cora is out of town. When Cora returns, she tells Frank she is pregnant. That night, Katz's assistant, Kennedy, appears at their door and threatens to expose them unless they give him $10,000. Enraged, Frank beats Kennedy up and strong-arms him into giving up the evidence against them.

When Frank returns, he finds that Madge has been to see Cora, who threatens to turn him in. They eventually patch together their tumultuous relationship and now plan for a future together. However, on the way back after having been married, Cora dies in a car accident while Frank is driving. Frank weeps over Cora's body.

== Cast ==
- Jack Nicholson – Frank Chambers
- Jessica Lange – Cora Smith/Papadakis
- John Colicos – Nick Papadakis
- Michael Lerner – Mr. Katz
- John P. Ryan – Ezra Liam Kennedy
- Anjelica Huston – Madge Gorland
- William Traylor – Kyle Sackett
- Ron Flagge – Shoeshine Man
- William Newman – Man from Home Town
- Chuck Liddell – Boy Scout
- Albert Henderson – Art Beeman
- Christopher Lloyd – Salesman

== Soundtrack ==
On May 14, 2012, Intrada Records released Michael Small's complete score for the first time.

== Release and reception ==
The film was screened out of competition at the 1981 Cannes Film Festival. Upon release, the film was poorly received by many critics, who felt that the remake of the 1946 film of the same name was wasted. They also believed the ending was "very weak" compared to the original film. They also criticized that the meaning of the title is not explained in the remake, which led to confusion among viewers. In a mixed review, Roger Ebert of the Chicago Sun-Times gave the film two-and-a-half stars out of four and called it "an absolutely superb mounting of a hollow and disappointing production." Jack Nicholson later said "If you ran a question through this industry about The Postman Always Rings Twice, most people would surmise that it wasn't successful. That is not true. I know it made money, because I received overages, so it must've grossed about as much as Chinatown and much more than Carnal Knowledge. But people are anxious to disqualify it."

The film has since been received more favorably. On the review aggregator website Rotten Tomatoes, 73% of 15 critics' reviews are positive. Metacritic, which uses a weighted average, assigned the film a score of 61 out of 100, based on 14 critics, indicating "generally favorable" reviews. Kerry Segrave and Linda Martin praised the "charged chemistry" between Nicholson and Lange, and stated that Nicholson admitted that he was smitten with his co-star, remarking that she was a "big consensus movie sex bomb". The film was nominated by the American Film Institute in 2002 for the AFI's 100 Years...100 Passions list.

The star of the 1946 version, Lana Turner, did not watch the remake, but said she had seen advertisements and blurbs on television that made her sick: she resented how the studio "turned it into such pornographic trash".

== Notes ==
Warner Bros. currently holds the rights to the film. Turner Entertainment Co. currently holds only the 1946 version (as part of the pre-May 1986 Metro-Goldwyn-Mayer library), not the second adaptation (since Lorimar produced this film), but Warner Bros. owns both films.

== See also ==
- Le Dernier Tournant, the 1939 French film adaptation of the novel
- Ossessione ("Obsession"), the 1943 Italian film adaptation of the novel
- The Postman Always Rings Twice, the 1946 American film adaptation of the novel
- Body Heat, a 1981 neo-noir film with similar themes, released five months after this film
- The Postman Always Rings Twice, a 1982 opera based on the novel
- Jerichow, the 2008 German film loosely based on the novel
