= Ryan Merriman =

American actor (born 1983)

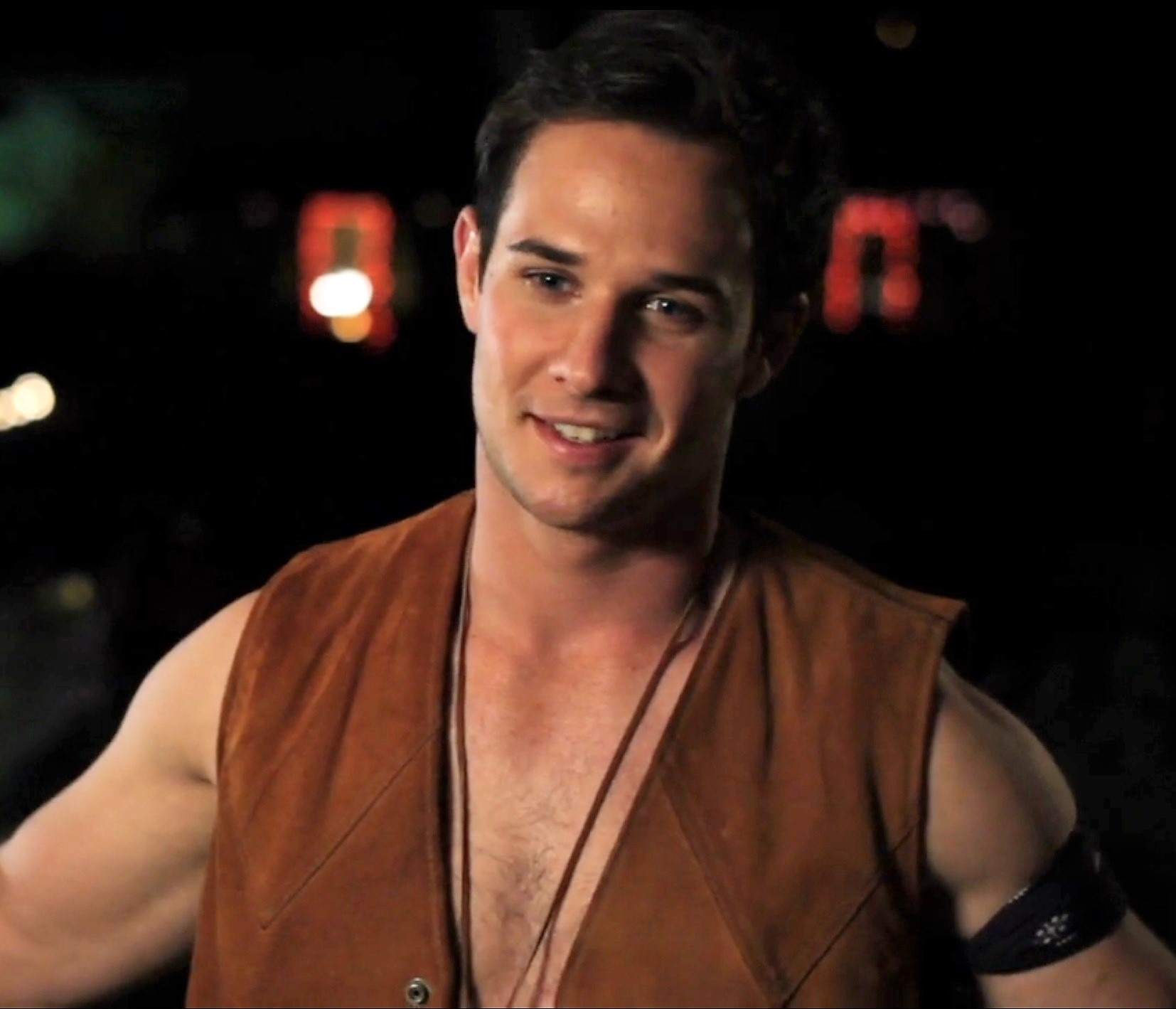
- Merriman in the 2012 film Cheesecake Casserole
- Born: Ryan Earl Merriman; April 10, 1983 (age 43); Choctaw, Oklahoma, U.S.
- Occupation: Actor
- Years active: 1993–present
- Spouses: Micol Duncan (m. 2004; div. 2011); Kristen McMullen (m. 2014)
- Children: 2

Ryan Earl Merriman (born April 10, 1983) is an American actor. He began his career at the age of ten and has appeared in several feature films and television shows. He is best known for a handful of Disney Channel original movies and for portraying Jake Pierce in The Ring Two, Kevin Fischer in Final Destination 3, and Ian Thomas in Pretty Little Liars.

== Early life ==
Merriman was born in Choctaw, Oklahoma, the son of Earl and Nonalyn Merriman. He has a sister named Monica. At a young age, he began acting in commercials, print work, vocal performances, and local theater (Stage Struck Studios) in Oklahoma.

== Career ==
Merriman's first major role was on the television series The Mommies, which ran from 1993 to 1995. He stated in a 1999 interview alongside Bobbie Wygant that he auditioned for the lead role in North (1994) before Elijah Wood was cast in 1993. During the 1990s, he appeared in most episodes of The Pretender as a younger version of Jarod, the series' main character. He has starred in several television films, including Smart House, The Luck of the Irish, and as a young Meyer Lansky in Lansky. He appeared in the 1999 feature film The Deep End of the Ocean, playing the lost son of Michelle Pfeiffer's character, and subsequently starred as the main character, a Jewish boy from the Bronx, in the 2000 film Just Looking. In 2002, he played Adam Eddington in another Disney Channel original movie, A Ring of Endless Light. He then returned to television roles, appearing in Dangerous Child, Taken, and Smallville.

Merriman's other roles include the horror films Halloween: Resurrection (2002), The Ring Two (2005), and Final Destination 3 (2006). He starred in Home of the Giants, a high school drama. He appeared in the CBS miniseries Comanche Moon in January 2008. He played Henry Dunn in the original pilot presentation for Harper's Island, but was replaced by Christopher Gorham when the series was picked up by CBS. From 2010 to 2014, Merriman portrayed Ian Thomas on ABC Family's Pretty Little Liars. In 2012, he starred as Dennis Mack in the 16th episode of Season 2 in Hawaii Five-0.

Dwight Little wanted Merriman to play Jin Kazama in his film Tekken, but Merriman turned it down. He starred in the Hallmark Channel original movie Elevator Girl as Jonathan, a successful young lawyer who finds himself falling for a free-spirited young woman who is way below his pay grade. In 2011, he appeared as linebacker Jon Abbate in The 5th Quarter, a film about the 2006 football season of Wake Forest University.

Since 2018, though he still occasionally appears in movies and TV shows, he works in Oklahoma as an entreprise account and sales manager in the dental healthcare sector.

== Personal life ==
Merriman was married to Micol Duncan from 2004 to 2011. On January 1, 2012, he became engaged to Kristen McMullen. They were married in September 2014. Their daughter Chloe was born in July 2018 and their son Jack was born in 2023.

== Filmography ==
=== Film ===
Year	Title	Role	Notes
1999	The Deep End of the Ocean	Benjamin "Ben" Cappadora / Sam Karras - Age 12	Young Artist Award for Best Performance in a Feature Film – Supporting Young Actor
1999	Just Looking	Lenny Levine	Nominated — Young Artist Award for Best Performance in a Feature Film – Leading Young Actor
2002	Halloween: Resurrection	Myles "Deckard" Barton	
2003	Spin	Eddie Haley	
2005	Rings	Jake Pierce	Short film
2005	The Ring Two	Jake Pierce	
2006	Final Destination 3	Kevin Fischer	
2007	Home of the Giants	Matt Morrison	
2009	Wild Cherry	Stanford	
2011	The 5th Quarter	Jon Abbate	
2012	Cheesecake Casserole	Andy	
2012	Attack of the 50 Foot Cheerleader	Kyle	
2012	My Hometown	Rick Dickson	
2013	Dose of Reality	Matt	
2013	42	Dixie Walker	
2015	The Last Rescue	Paratrooper Griggs	
2016	The Congressman	Jared Barnes	
2016	A Sunday Horse	Jonathan Collier	
2016	Domain	Denver	
2016	Fortune Cookie	Bryce	
2018	The Jurassic Games	The Host	
2019	Portal	Steven	
2020	Robot Riot	Main Role	Amazon Prime
2024	Model House	The Neighbor	

=== Television ===
Year	Title	Role	Notes
1993–1995	The Mommies	Blake Kellogg	Main role, 30 episodes Nominated — Young Artist Award for Outstanding Youth Ensemble in a Television Series
1995	The Client	Jeff Dietrich	Episode: "The Way Things Were"
1996–2000	The Pretender	Young Jarod / Gemini	Main role, 50 episodes Nominated — Young Artist Award for Best Performance in a TV Drama Series – Supporting Young Actor (1997); Young Artist Award for Best Performance in a TV Drama Series – Supporting Young Actor (1998, 1999)
1997	What's Right With America	Todd Gordon	Television film
1998	Everything That Rises	Nathan Clay	Television film Young Artist Award for Best Performance in a TV Movie/Pilot/Mini-Series or Series – Leading Young Actor
1999	Night Ride Home	Justin	Television film
1999	Smart House	Ben Cooper	Disney Channel Original Movie
1999	Lansky	Meyer Lansky	Television film
2000	Rocket's Red Glare	Todd Baker	Television film
2001	The Luck of the Irish	Kyle Johnson	Disney Channel Original Movie
2001	Touched by an Angel	Jason Harris	Episode: "Visions of thy Father"
2001	Dangerous Child	Jack Cambridge	Television film Young Artist Award for Best Performance in a TV Movie or Special – Leading Young Actor
2002	Taken	Sam Crawford	Episode: "Acid Tests"; Young Artist Award for Best Performance in a TV Movie, Mini-Series or Special – Supporting Young Actor
2002	A Ring of Endless Light	Adam Eddington	Disney Channel Original Movie
2003–2004	Veritas: The Quest	Nikko Zond	Main role, 13 episodes
2004	Smallville	Jason Dante	Episode: "Velocity"
2005	The Colt	Jim Rabb	Television film (Hallmark)
2008	Comanche Moon	Jake Spoon	3 episodes
2008	Backwoods	Adam	Television film
2010	Elevator Girl	Johnathan	Television film
2010–2014	Pretty Little Liars	Ian Thomas	Recurring role, 16 episodes
2012	Hawaii Five-0	Dennis Mack	Episode: "I Helu Pu"
2013	Independence Daysaster	Pete Garsette	Television film
2015	Ballers	Frat Boy	Episode: Pilot
2015	How Not to Propose	Travis	Television film
2019	A Christmas Movie Christmas	Dustin	Television film
