= The Janitor Always Mops Twice =

- It's Always Sunny in Philadelphia episode
- Episode no.: Season 14; Episode 6
- Directed by: Heath Cullens
- Written by: Megan Ganz
- Cinematography by: John Tanzer
- Editing by: Josh Drisko
- Production code: XIP14005
- Original air date: October 30, 2019
- Running time: 22 minutes

Guest appearances
- David Hornsby as Cricket; Mary Elizabeth Ellis as The Waitress; Wass Stevens as Vince; Gilberto Ortiz as Teen Boy

Episode chronology
← Previous "The Gang Texts"	Next → "The Gang Solves Global Warming"
- It's Always Sunny in Philadelphia season 14

"The Janitor Always Mops Twice" is the sixth episode of the fourteenth season of the American television sitcom It's Always Sunny in Philadelphia. It is the 150th overall episode of the series, and was written by executive producer Megan Ganz, and directed by Heath Cullens. It originally aired on FXX on October 30, 2019. The episode is a parody of the noir genre, with its title being a reference to the James M. Cain novel The Postman Always Rings Twice (1934).

The series follows "The Gang", a group of five misfit friends: twins Dennis and Deandra "(Sweet) Dee" Reynolds, their friends Charlie Kelly and Ronald "Mac" McDonald, and Frank Reynolds, Dennis' and Dee's legal father. The Gang runs the fictional Paddy's Pub, an unsuccessful Irish bar in South Philadelphia. In the episode, Charlie navigates Philadelphia's seedy underbelly to discover how Frank got diarrhea. It is presented in black-and-white, with limited use of red. (Note: The color red is used to depict blood, lipstick, punch, cherries, The Waitress' dress, paint and an AA chip.)

== Plot ==
Opening with an in medias res flashforward, Charlie (Charlie Day) stumbles around Paddy's Pub with red all over his stomach. Flashing back to "when it all began", Charlie has just dealt with a clogged disabled toilet when Dennis (Glenn Howerton) walks in, giving Charlie a cleaning job. Charlie declines, and Dennis brings out Mac (Rob McElhenney) in an attempt to intimidate him. Charlie knocks Mac out, but gives in to Dennis' demands and starts mopping the floor. Charlie follows a trail of blood when Dee (Kaitlin Olson) enters Paddy's and informs him that Frank (Danny DeVito) has been diarrhea-poisoned and is staying at her place. Dee asks Charlie to come and get rid of Frank in exchange for a new set of rags, and he agrees. At Dee's apartment, Charlie questions Frank about the diarrhea, but Frank clams up and denies any foul play was involved.

The next day, Charlie goes around, trying to find anyone with a grudge against Frank, when he sees Vince (Wass Stevens) bothering his girlfriend, the Waitress (Mary Elizabeth Ellis), and scares him off. Charlie tells the Waitress that he'll protect her from Vince if he tries anything, and she thanks him. In Paddy's, Charlie finds that Dennis and Mac have a motive to want to hurt Frank, but they deny it. Charlie follows who he thinks is Dee, but it turns out to be Rickety Cricket (David Hornsby) cross-dressing. Cricket reveals to Charlie that he's been working for Frank, who has been paying him to contaminate cherries with feces. Charlie returns to his apartment, where the Waitress enters and she and Charlie kiss. The next morning, Charlie wakes up to find Dee in his bed, pretending to be dead, and Dennis and Mac trying to blackmail him by framing him for murder. Dennis explains that he and Mac work for Frank, who sells uncontaminated cherries at a mark up price. Charlie tells them to arrange him a meeting with Vince.

Charlie arranges to meets Frank in Paddy's basement, where he finds him bleeding out. Frank reveals that he sells the cherries illegally due to Red 40 being banned. Charlie asks Frank who poisoned him when he's knocked out by Vince. He wakes up and sees Vince holding a red 40-day AA chip, and thus pours ammonia-bleach to knock Vince out. Charlie eats a pie the Waitress made for him, and realizes he's been poisoned. The Waitress reveals that she has been pupeteering Frank's cherry plan, and that she poisoned Frank and Vince, the latter of whom was actually her AA sponsor. Charlie reveals that he knew the Waitress was going to poison him, and he took bleach beforehand. Charlie vomits the cherry all over the Waitress, and Dee enters, claiming to have been an undercover police officer. Dee arrests the Waitress, and Charlie stumbles towards the toilets.

== Production ==
The episode omits the usual opening credits, instead having period-appropriate font on the backdrop of Charlie's bloody handprint on the door to the men's toilets. The episode was directed by Heath Cullens, and was written by executive producer Megan Ganz. The episode is a parody of the noir genre, with its title being a reference to the 1946 film The Postman Always Rings Twice, itself based on the 1934 novel of the same name by James M. Cain.

== Reception ==
The episode was watched by 248 thousand viewers on its initial airing. It was received positively, with Screen Rant calling it "The Funniest Episode Of The Series". Nick Harley of Den of Geek called it "a season-best episode". The A.V. Club gave the episode an A− rating, and called it a "killer... pastiche".
