= William Gregory Lee =

American actor (born 1973)

- Born: January 24, 1973 (age 53); Virginia Beach, Virginia, U.S.
- Years active: 1996–present

William Gregory Lee (born January 24, 1973) is an American actor.

== Career ==
His first prominent role was as Virgil on Xena: Warrior Princess in the last 2 seasons. He also played the character of Zack on the series Dark Angel (2000–2001).

Lee has appeared in a number of other roles, including the 2002 horror film Wolves of Wall Street and his role as Ambrosius Vallin in the here! original series Dante's Cove.

He has also appeared as Sven in the 2005 film Beauty and the Beast.

== Filmography ==
=== Film ===
Year	Title	Role	Notes
1997	Anything Once	Mike	short
2002	Fits and Starts	Intense Boy-Man	
2002	Wolves of Wall Street	Jeff Allen	
2004	In Enemy Hands	U.S.S. Logan Radarman	
2004	Cruel Intentions 3	Assistant Registrar	
2005	Wheelmen	Andy	
2005	Blood of Beasts	Sven	
2005	Hell to Pay	Chance	
2005	The Cabinet of Dr. Caligari	Joseph Stern	
2006	Sam's Lake	Jesse	
2007	Desperate Escape	Bill Masterson	
2007	Mexican Sunrise	Wil	
2008	House of Fallen	Brooks	
2008	Fall of Hyperion	Ken Stone	
2009	Tripping Forward	Tripp	
2009	Bitch Slap	Hot Wire	
2016	Domain	Boston	
2018	First Man	Gordon Cooper	
2021	Things Don't Stay Fixed	Sam Grace	

=== Television ===
Year	Title	Role	Notes
1996	A Kiss So Deadly	Adam	TV movie
1997	Beverly Hills, 90210	Club-Goer	Episode: "Straight Shooter"
1997	The Young and the Restless	Hutch	2 episodes
1998	Rude Awakening	Paul	Episode: "Vagina"
1998	Wind on Water	Cole Connolly	Main role (4 episodes)
1999	Clueless	Wesley Hamilton	Episode: "All Night Senior Party"
2000	Brutally Normal	Dan Riley	Episode: "Mouth Full of Warm Roses"
2000	Xena: Warrior Princess	Virgil	6 episodes
2000–2001	Dark Angel	Zack / X5-599	8 episodes
2001	Baywatch	Eric	Episode: "The Stalker"
2001	V.I.P.	Hans Lamal / Kenny Farmer	Episode: "21 Val Street"
2002	JAG	Lt. Andrew Wick	Episode: "Enemy Below"
2003	JAG	Lt. Dave Phelps	Episode: "The Boast"
2003	Run of the House	Justin	Episode: "The Party"
2004	Nip/Tuck	Airport Security Guard	Episode: "Joan Rivers"
2004–2007	Dante's Cove	Ambrosius Vallin	Main role (12 episodes)
2005	NCIS	Metro Police Sgt. Keith Archer	Episode: "Probie"
2006	Las Vegas	Scott	Episode: "Bait and Switch"
2007	CSI: NY	Martin Boggs	Episode: "Past Imperfect"
2009	Hydra	Clarence Elkins	TV movie
2011	Femme Fatales	Jimmy	Episode: "The White Flower"
2011–2014	Justified	Sheriff Nick Mooney	14 episodes
2012	NCIS: Los Angeles	Blake Mayfield	Episode: "Sans Voir"
2015	The Mentalist	Steve Sellers	Episode: "Nothing Gold Can Stay"
2020	The Walking Dead	Male Whisperer / Chanting Whisperer	2 episodes
2022	The Staircase	Suit #1	2 episodes
