= The Gang Gets Romantic =

- It's Always Sunny in Philadelphia episode
- Episode no.: Season 14; Episode 1
- Directed by: Glenn Howerton
- Written by: Rob McElhenney; Charlie Day
- Cinematography by: John Tanzer
- Editing by: Josh Drisko
- Production code: XIP14001
- Original air date: September 25, 2019
- Running time: 24 minutes

Guest appearances
- Britt Lower as Lisa; Timm Sharp as Greg; David Agranov as Nikki; Alexander Leeb as Alexi

Episode chronology
← Previous "Mac Finds His Pride"	Next → "Thunder Gun 4: Maximum Cool"
- It's Always Sunny in Philadelphia season 14

"The Gang Gets Romantic" is the first episode of the fourteenth season of the American sitcom television series It's Always Sunny in Philadelphia. It is the 145th overall episode of the series and was written by series developers, executive producers and lead actors Rob McElhenney and Charlie Day, and directed by Glenn Howerton. It originally aired on FXX on September 25, 2019.

The series follows "The Gang", a group of five misfit friends: twins Dennis and Deandra "(Sweet) Dee" Reynolds, their friends Charlie Kelly and Ronald "Mac" McDonald, and Frank Reynolds, Dennis' and Dee's legal father. The Gang runs the fictional Paddy's Pub, an unsuccessful Irish bar in South Philadelphia. In the episode, Mac and Dennis house a couple whose marriage may be on the skids through an Airbnb ad, while Charlie and Frank use an ad to invite European girls to their apartment.

According to Nielsen Media Research, the episode was seen by an estimated 0.481 million household viewers and gained a 0.28 ratings share among adults aged 18–49. The episode received positive reviews from critics, who praised the humor, although some expressed disappointment at the weak follow-up to the previous season's ending.

== Plot ==
Mac (Rob McElhenney) and Dennis (Glenn Howerton) begin working on a new scheme; they will use Dennis' apartment as an Airbnb for women, which Mac deems "meet-cute". At the same time, Charlie (Charlie Day) and Frank (Danny DeVito) are also posting ads across the city, hoping to meet young European female backpackers to crash at their house.

Mac and Dennis welcome the new guest, Lisa (Britt Lower), but are disappointed to learn that she is bringing her husband, Greg (Timm Sharp). Overhearing arguing over a person named "Teddy", Mac starts developing a "romantic comedy" solution to the problem, by having Greg get together with Dee (Kaitlin Olson), but it backfires. Frank and Charlie are delighted upon learning that two Austrians, Alexi (Alexander Leeb) and Nikki (David Agranov), have agreed to meet at their apartment. However, they are disappointed to learn that they are actually men. Although initially disgusted, they get to appreciate the men as they help them with their problems. When two girls ask to book the apartment, however, Charlie and Frank decide to kick Alexi and Nikki out.

Suspecting that Greg cheated on Lisa with Teddy, Mac decides to flirt with Greg. However, Greg and Lisa reveal that Teddy was their son, who died of leukemia. They leave in disgust, disappointing Mac that he didn't get his "romantic comedy ending." While Charlie and Frank have sex with the girls, they are not delighted over their drug addicted lives and their personalities. Receiving a "meat cube" gift from Alexi and Nikki, they decide to catch them at the bus station before they leave. While Alexi and Nikki miss them, they say they must return to Austria, but promise to come back exactly one year from now.

== Production ==
=== Development ===
In August 2019, it was reported that the first episode of the season would be titled "The Gang Gets Romantic", and was to be written by series developers, executive producers and lead actors Rob McElhenney and Charlie Day, and directed by Glenn Howerton. This was McElhenney's 52nd writing credit, Day's 58th writing credit, and Howerton's first directing credit.

=== Filming ===
Filming for the episode and the season started on June 13, 2019.

== Reception ==
=== Viewers ===
In its original American broadcast, "The Gang Gets Romantic" was seen by an estimated 0.481 million household viewers and gained a 0.28 ratings share among adults aged 18–49, according to Nielsen Media Research. This means that 0.28 percent of all households with televisions watched the episode. This was a 34% increase in viewership from the previous episode, which was watched by 0.357 million viewers with a 0.20 in the 18-49 demographics.

=== Critical reviews ===
"The Gang Gets Romantic" received positive reviews from critics. Matt Fowler of IGN gave the episode a "great" 8.4 out of 10 and wrote in his verdict, "Always Sunny kicks off Season 14 strong, examining all the ways a rom-com can go dreadfully wrong. And as long as The Gang continues to be wrong about everything, and also willing to argue their invalid points ad nauseam, the show will always have legs."

Dennis Perkins of The A.V. Club gave the episode a "B–" grade and wrote, "After ending its 13th season with a development so stunningly heartfelt and seemingly show-breaking as to throw our expectations for its record-tying 14th season entirely into the realm of the unknown, 'The Gang Gets Romantic' surprises us by not doing anything especially surprising at all. Which would be less of an issue if the old groove the show settles back into as it comes out of the gate weren't so well-worn."

Chris Longo of Den of Geek gave the episode a 4 star rating out of 5 and wrote, "Where comedies of a certain age routinely fail to recapture the magic of their early years, “The Gang Gets Romantic” is a prime example of how Always Sunny can still hit all the same notes as some of their greatest hits." Andrew Bloom of Consequence wrote, "In “The Gang Gets Romantic”, the meld of romcom tropes and the particular brand of psychopathy that takes hold in Paddy's Pub becomes truly hilarious, and even oddly sweet, in the juxtaposition."

Ray Flook of Bleeding Cool wrote, "The episode didn't miss a beat – nothing about it felt as if there had been any delay between seasons, yet each of them were placed in situations that reminded us of the core traits." Kevin Yeoman of Screen Rant wrote, "Most shows that are this long in the tooth have long since lost their edge, and while It's Always Sunny may no longer be at the peak of its comedic potential, it still offers a winning comedy for anyone who can find FXX on their cable subscription."
