= Home of the Giants =

- Theatrical release poster
- Directed by: Rusty Gorman
- Written by: Rusty Gorman
- Produced by: SymPics International, Inc
- Starring: Haley Joel Osment; Ryan Merriman; Danielle Panabaker
- Music by: Michael Suby
- Release date: October 12, 2007 (Chicago Film Festival)
- Running time: 104 minutes
- Country: United States
- Language: English

Home of the Giants is a 2007 American sports crime drama film written and directed by Rusty Gorman, and starring Haley Joel Osment, Ryan Merriman and Danielle Panabaker. The film has been described as a coming of age tale and sports drama.

== Plot ==
Like everyone in Riverton, Indiana, seventeen-year-old Robert "Gar" Gartland (Haley Joel Osment) loves his school's basketball team, the Riverton Giants. His best friend, Matt Morrison (Ryan Merriman), is the star of the Riverton Giants. When Matt makes Robert take part in the robbery of a small-time drug dealer, things do not go as planned and Robert faces the challenge of saving the team from a desperate predicament with the state championship and Matt's future on the line.

In Indiana, high school basketball is a way of life. This fanaticism serves as a backdrop for a story that explores peer pressure, perspective and the difference between a friend and a hero. Gar believes Matt can do no wrong. While he supports and encourages his best friend's antics, Gar finds himself falling in love with Bridgette, an outsider who does not embrace the celebrity status given basketball players in her new hometown. From high school parties, pep rallies and Hoosier hysteria, to robbing a drug dealer, being stalked and blackmailed, defying a hero and confronting his adversaries, Gar comes to terms with his false belief, and gains a new level of awareness about himself and his hometown.

== Cast ==
- Haley Joel Osment as Robert Gartland
- Ryan Merriman as Matt Morrison
- Danielle Panabaker as Bridgette Bachman
- Kenneth Mitchell as Keith Morrison
- Brent Briscoe as Prock
- Stephen Michael Ayers as Coach Gordon
- Jay Bilas as himself
- Johanna Braddy as Freshman
- Wayne Coyne as Barfly
- Marie Gulliver as Robert's love interest

== Release ==
Home of the Giants was first screened on May 9, 2007, at The Zanuck theater in Los Angeles. This screening was mainly for meant for the industry but fans also got the opportunity to attend the screening for free.

Shortly after the first screening, Home of the Giants was screened 3 times at the Cannes Film Festival in May 2007.

The next screening was in Chicago at the Landmark Theatres in Chicago on July 12, 2007. This was for a private audience mainly consisting of Rusty Gorman's friends and associates. Haley Joel Osment, Ryan Merriman and Nona Merriman attended this screening as well.

The next series of screenings were at the Chicago International Film Festival (3 times) and Heartland Film Festival (6 times) in October 2007.

While a distribution deal is still in the talks, several articles have suggested a spring 2008 release. The distribution deal should be finalized somewhere in November 2007.

The next series of screenings are at the 6 Palm Beach International Film Festival (April 14, 2008) and Omaha Film Festival (February 20, 2008 and February 23, 2008).

On October 10, 2008, the film screened at the Midwest Independent Film Festival in Chicago, and was later nominated for Best feature and Best director at the Best of the Midwest Awards.

On January 7, 2009, the Region 4 DVD was released in Australia and on February 23, 2009, the Region 2 DVD was released in South Africa.

== Reviews ==
- 'Intense, superbly crafted thriller' - Indianapolis Business Journal
- 'Skillful, believable and genuinely suspenseful' - Chicagoist.com
- 'A dark-laced "Hoosiers" that scores from all over the story court' - Hollywood Reporter

== Soundtrack ==
According to the official end crawl credits

== Production ==
Principal photography for Home of the Giants occurred September 6, 2005 through October 9, 2005.

Although the movie is set in Indiana, the basketball scenes were filmed in North Carolina. Many of the extras included students from area high schools, such as Wesleyan Christian Academy (students Andrew Smith, Daniel Gingerich, and Neal Lain), and local colleges such as Wake Forest University, and the University of North Carolina at Greensboro. Both the Giants' and their opponents' pep bands were made up of members of the Walter Hines Page Senior High School Band of Greensboro, North Carolina. These musicians appear around the actors in many other shots. The Giants' cheerleaders are members of the Greensboro Allstars cheerleading squad coached by Amy Tyler.

== See also ==
- List of basketball films
