= Rocket's Red Glare =

- Written by: Chris Bremble
- Story by: John Palmer
- Directed by: Chris Bremble
- Starring: Robert Wagner; Marilu Henner; Ryan Merriman
- Theme music composer: Lior Rosner
- Country of origin: United States
- Original language: English

Production
- Producer: Mike Elliott
- Cinematography: Jacques Haitkin

Original release
- Network: Fox Family
- Release: August 27, 2000

Rocket's Red Glare is an American television film that originally aired on Fox Family on August 27, 2000. The film stars Robert Wagner, Marilu Henner, and Ryan Merriman. Rocket's Red Glare was originally titled Mercury Project.

== Plot ==
Teenager Todd Baker and his former astronaut grandfather Gus team up to rebuild a Mercury Redstone Rocket for Todd's school project.

== Cast ==
- Robert Wagner as Gus Baker
- Ryan Merriman as Todd Baker
- Marilu Henner as Meg Baker
- Fred Coffin as Mitch Greer
- Danielle Fishel as Sarah Miller
- John Finn as Wyatt Claybourne
- Duane A. Lamb as himself (Col Lamb)
- Sarah Lancaster as Carol
- Clayton Landey as Colonel Vincenze
- Cory Pendergast as Jason Jones
- Joel Polis as Colonel Mitchell
- Taryn Reif as Jen Karsten
- Bill Timoney as Pete Baker
- Brandon Tyler as Vic Henry
- Matt Winston as Mr. Lake
- Alan Bean as Himself
- Gordon Cooper as Himself
- Kris Barcomb as LT Barcomb

== Reception ==
Dove Foundation rated the film 2 stars.
