= Domain (2016 film) =

2016 film

- Film poster
- Directed by: Nathaniel Atcheson
- Written by: Nathaniel Atcheson
- Produced by: Elizabeth Hughes
- Starring: Britt Lower; Ryan Merriman; William Gregory Lee; Sonja Sohn; Cedric Sanders; Nick Gomez; Kevin Sizemore; Beth Grant
- Cinematography: Benjamin Kantor
- Edited by: Nathaniel Atcheson
- Music by: Jonathan Snipes
- Release date: 4 December 2016
- Running time: 97 minutes
- Country: United States
- Language: English

Domain is a 2016 science fiction film directed by Nathaniel Atcheson. It premiered at the Austin, Texas, Other Worlds sci-fi film festival.

Domain's plot has retrospectively been cited for its similarities to the COVID-19 pandemic.

== Plot ==
Phoenix is one of many individuals who are housed in separate underground bunkers in an effort to save the human race from a deadly flu virus that is destroying the planet. A video narrated by a scientist named Nadine shows that each bunker has enough food to last them 70 years and technology capable of providing energy, air quality, and other life support systems. In order to combat the effects of physical isolation the inhabitants have access to a social network called "The Domain", which allows groups of seven survivors to communicate with each other, access each other's health status, and overall statistics about the number of other inhabitants, of which only 489,573 remain after 5 to 7 years. Phoenix's group is made up of herself, Boston, Atlanta, Chicago, Houston, Denver, and Orlando, each of whom is nicknamed after the city in which they reside. Orlando takes great pleasure in tormenting the others and has recently confessed to being a serial killer prior to the virus. Denver, who is in a romantic relationship with Phoenix, suggests cutting Orlando's feed via hacking. The group votes and the majority, including Orlando, vote to remove his feed. This doesn't sit well with Phoenix, who voted against cutting the feed.

The bunker systems begin to malfunction, particularly in Houston's bunker. Houston theorizes that they are being toyed with and begins to show signs of a psychotic break, particularly after Denver discovers private footage of Orlando showing that he was taken out of his bunker by figures hidden by video static. Phoenix reveals to Denver that she was in prison due to killing her mother in a drug fueled haze. The group later wakes to find Houston bashing his head against the bunker wall, prompting him to be similarly taken. The following morning Phoenix finds a rat in her bunker and discovers a vent, prompting the group to investigate their spaces. Atlanta breaks open the tube that delivers her food and discovers nothing but dark, empty space behind her wall. The figures similarly appear and take her away. Despondent, Chicago hangs himself, leaving only Phoenix, Denver, and Boston. Denver continues to investigate via hacking and reports that there were never half a million bunkers, but rather only 1,000. He is able to view other feeds, most of which are either empty or show that the bunker inhabitant has committed suicide. Those that contain living people display them experiencing the same phenomena and stress. They decide to escape and upon exiting the bunker Phoenix discovers that they are not underground or in different states, rather they were all in individual rooms alongside each other.

The trio goes outside, where they find themselves on a rooftop in the middle of a city that shows no sign of a virus. They also see guards standing by the exit. Boston willingly serves as a distraction so Phoenix and Denver can escape together. They find an office containing their personal information but before they can flee Nadine appears and holds them at gunpoint. She reveals that this was all an experiment to save the world and that all participants were prisoners who were chosen because they were unlikely to reveal their criminal pasts and were also likely to believe the hoax and use the isolation as an opportunity to reinvent themselves. The experiment was going well until they blocked Orlando and the footage was leaked to the outside world. They were also taken to the rooms after being drugged. The government cancelled the experiment, in part due to public outrage because the prisoners were unaware of the experiment and the belief that the bunkers were too nice for prisoners. Nadine reveals that each of them were in prison for murder. Atlanta killed her children, Houston was a gang member who killed twenty people, Chicago was a sex worker who murdered his clients, Boston killed his brothers after a bank robbery, and Denver is a sociopathic serial killer who chose his victims from dating websites. Phoenix and Denver are tasered into unconsciousness and awake restrained on opposite sides of the room. They talk and Denver reveals that he was relatively aware that this was an experiment, but kept quiet because he found it entertaining. He also found Phoenix to be the most special of his targets, as she was unattainable. They are taken back to their bunkers, where it's shown that everyone other than Chicago is still alive. Orlando is shot and killed after he tries charging the guards. The film ends with Phoenix reciting a prayer Atlanta had given her earlier as each prisoner is shown reacting differently to the revelations, ranging from despair (Atlanta) to ambivalence (Denver).

== Cast ==
- Britt Lower as Phoenix
- Ryan Merriman as Denver
- William Gregory Lee as Boston
- Sonja Sohn as Atlanta
- Cedric Sanders as Chicago
- Nick Gomez as Houston
- Kevin Sizemore as Orlando
- Beth Grant as Nadine

== Reception ==
=== Critical response ===
On Rotten Tomatoes, the film holds an approval rating of 71% based on 7 reviews.

Noel Murray of Los Angeles Times panned the film, writing that Atcheson "found a clever way to tell a lot of story without many resources" but that "the end result is still more exhausting than enticing." Conversely, Anton Bitel of Sight & Sound wrote that "there is a decidedly existential flavour to the film's preoccupation with infernal routines and the hell of other people [...] It is also a film which understands full well that strange mix of horror and relief that comes with being blocked from a social network." John Petkovic of The Plain Dealer also praised the film, noting that it is "most entertaining when it gets twisted."
