= Dangerous Child =

2001 television film directed by Graeme Campbell

- Written by: Karen Stillman
- Directed by: Graeme Campbell
- Starring: Delta Burke; Ryan Merriman; Vyto Ruginis; Marc Donato; Barclay Hope; Rosemary Dunsmore; Deborah Odell
- Music by: Peter Manning Robinson
- Country of origin: Canada
- Original language: English

Production
- Executive producer: Freyda Rothstein
- Producer: Terry Gould
- Cinematography: Nikos Evdemon
- Editor: Michael Schweitzer
- Running time: 90 minutes

Original release
- Network: Lifetime
- Release: July 16, 2001

Dangerous Child is a 2001 made-for-television film starring Delta Burke and Ryan Merriman. Merriman won a Young Artist Award for "Best Performance in a TV Movie or Special - Leading Young Actor" for his role in the film.

The film was released on VHS in 2002, followed by a DVD release in 2008.

== Plot ==
Sally Cambridge is the divorced mother of two sons, 16-year-old Jack and 9-year-old Leo. As the film opens, she is arrested on suspicion of child abuse, and during questioning, she reveals the story of what actually happened, told via flashback.

One evening, a call to Jack's basketball coach reveals that he has been given a two-week suspension from the team due to poor grades, which Jack did not tell her. Compounded with the fact that he stayed out past curfew that night, Sally attempts to talk to Jack about his problems, but he angrily orders her out of his bedroom, slightly shoving her in the process. A short time later, while hanging out with his friend Luke, Jack is arrested for shoplifting at the local mall, and when Sally attempts to question him afterwards, he again becomes furious and smashes a glass. She later tries to ask Jack what caused this outburst, but he tells her he doesn't know and tearfully apologizes.

Not long afterwards, Sally goes on a date with a colleague named Frank, who is also divorced. While Leo warms up to him immediately, Jack is outright rude when Frank arrives to pick Sally up, and when she reprimands Jack for his behavior, he shouts at her and then pushes her aside. Later that night, Jack receives a phone call from Luke, and although entrusted with watching his little brother, he leaves Leo alone to go to a party. Furious, Sally grounds Jack for a month and takes the phone to call Luke's mother. A confrontation ensues, which soon turns physical, and when Sally slaps Jack in retaliation, he attempts to punch her, but she ducks and he ends up putting his hand through a window, cutting his arm in the process.

A couple of nights later, Sally has Frank over for dinner, but Jack is once again rude, and when Sally tries to talk to him afterwards, it escalates into another physical confrontation, which is cut short by a visit from the police. Both Sally and Jack claim that nothing's wrong, which satisfies them, but the next day sees Leo discovering Gus, the family cat, with a broken leg. After he and Sally return home from the vet, she finds Jack crying in his room, holding Gus and apologizing to him repeatedly.

Realizing her son has a problem, Sally seeks advice at a women's shelter, where a counselor suggests she take out an order of protection against Jack. Though she goes to the police station, Sally changes her mind and instead goes to her ex-husband Brad's office and attempts to explain what happened the night of Jack's "accident", but Brad blames her for not having control over the situation, and takes custody of the boys. While at Brad's, an argument ensues between Leo and his stepmother Marcia, with Leo taking an angry tone not unlike Jack's. Later that night, Jack decides to go back home and apologize to his mother, but is greeted upon his arrival by the sight of his mother in an embrace with Frank, which sets off another physical confrontation between Jack and Sally. Having followed his brother there, Leo attempts to stop Jack, but gets pushed in the struggle and inadvertently strikes his head as he falls to the floor.

After Sally's arrest, she is brought to the hospital to see Leo, where Jack and Brad are waiting; realizing the charges his mother faces, Jack finally owns up to his misdeeds, confessing to the accompanying officers and his father that he was the one responsible for everything. As a result, Sally is released and Jack gets arrested for assault. Although the prosecutor is unwilling to drop the charges against Jack, an offer is made to defer them if Sally and Brad file an at-risk youth petition, which mandates that Jack be placed in a treatment program, during which time he will also be put in temporary foster care, and that his parents undergo individual counseling. Afterwards, Brad takes responsibility for his own anger issues, which Sally points out that their sons have picked up on, and informs him they need to work together to get Jack the help he needs.

During his group counseling sessions, Jack comes to understand that his violent outbursts were learned behavior, rooted in the verbal abuse his father often dealt towards his mother, while Sally's individual sessions gives her the opportunity to acknowledge her own father's verbally abusive behavior toward her mother, as well as her own tendency to back down on enforcing discipline in an effort to avoid a verbal showdown, and what she perceives as having failed at her marriage. However, her therapist points out that Sally did not fail at her marriage; she simply couldn't tolerate the verbal abuse from Brad, and getting out of it was the best thing she could have done.

After returning home, Jack admits to his mother about having felt relief when Brad left and knowing she felt the same, while Sally acknowledges she had no idea how to make Brad stop behaving the way he did towards her, and Jack adds that he didn't either. The two then embrace, with Jack apologizing to Sally as she assures him that things are going to be OK and they're both getting the help they need.

== Cast ==
- Delta Burke as Sally Cambridge
- Ryan Merriman as Jack Cambridge
- Vyto Ruginis as Brad Cambridge
- Marc Donato as Leo Cambridge
- Barclay Hope as Frank
- Rosemary Dunsmore as Margo
- Deborah Odell as Marcia Cambridge
- Tamsin Kelsey as Virginia
- Dan Petronijevic as Luke
- Asia Viera as Kayla
- Patricia Wanstall as Amber
- Jonathan Payne as Seth
- Linda Salkeld as Wendy
- Shannon Hile as Alice
- Johnie Chase as Nicholas
- Paulino Nunes as George
- James Carroll as Sperling
- Lubomir Mykytiuk as Dr. Tillet
- Jonathan Lloyd Walker as Officer J. Driscoll
- Elizabeth Saunders as Officer H. Valinsky (credited as Elizabeth Brown)
- Jane Luk as Brad's Receptionist
