= Denis Jean Achille Luchaire =

French historian

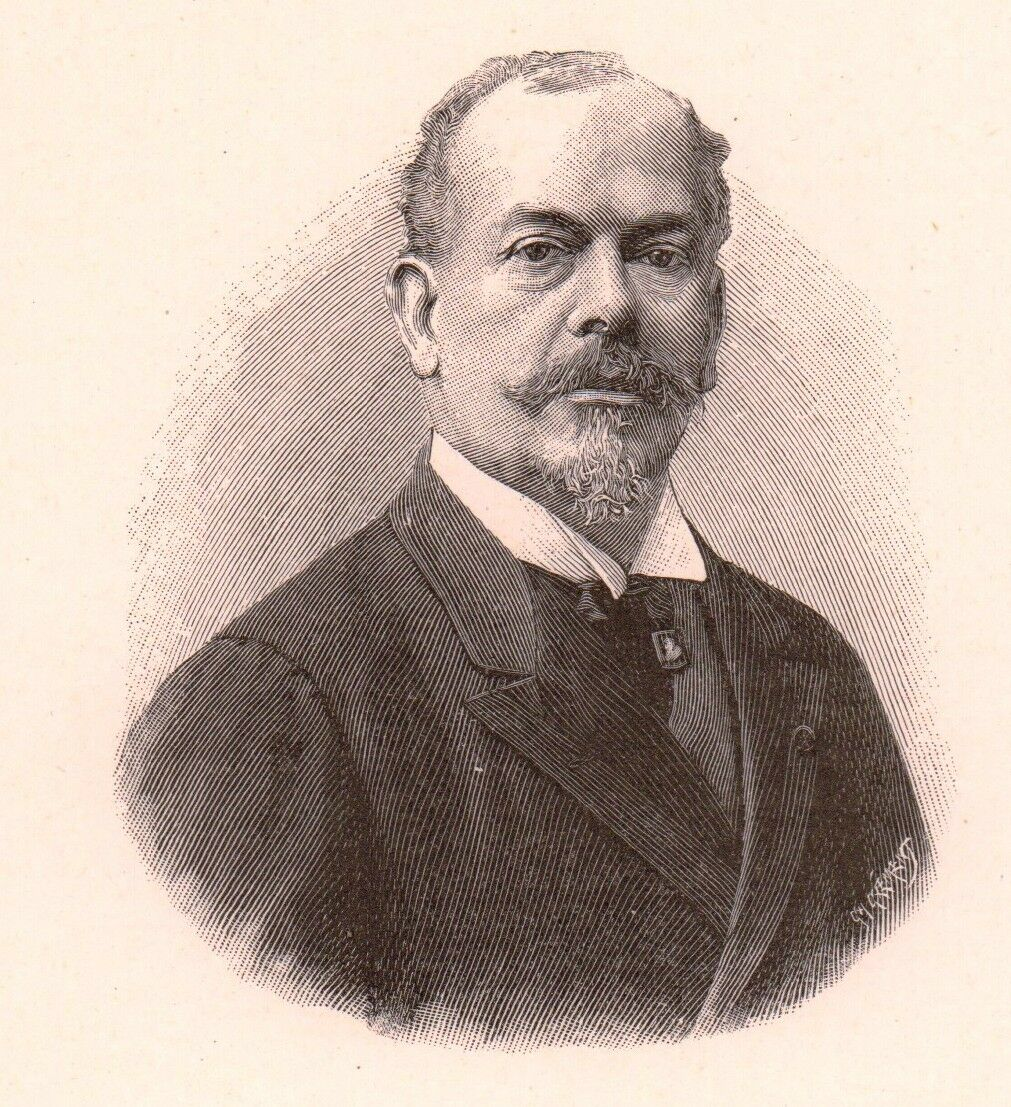
Denis Jean Achille Luchaire

Denis Jean Achille Luchaire (French pronunciation: [dəni ʒɑ̃ aʃil lyʃɛʁ]; October 24, 1846 – November 14, 1908) was a French historian.

== Biography ==
Luchaire was born in Paris. In 1879 he became a professor at Bordeaux and in 1889 professor of mediaeval history at the Sorbonne; in 1895 he became a member of the Académie des sciences morales et politiques, where he obtained the Jean Reynaud prize just before his death.

His grandnephew was the French journalist Jean Luchaire, a collaborationist with the Nazis during World War II.

== Works ==
The most important of Achille Luchaire's earlier works is his Histoire des institutions monarchiques de la France sous les premiers Capétiens (1883 and again 1891); he also wrote:

- Manuel des institutions françaises: période des Capétiens directs (1892)
- Louis VI le Gros, annales de sa vie et de son règne (1890)
- Étude sur les actes de Louis VII (1885).

His later writings deal mainly with the history of the papacy, and took the form of an elaborate work on Pope Innocent III. This is divided into six parts:

1. Rome et Italie (1904)
2. La Croisade des Albigeois (1905)
3. La Papauté et l'Empire (1905)
4. La Question d'Orient (1906)
5. Les Royautés vassales du Saint-Siège (1908)
6. Le Concile de Latran et la réforme de l'Église (1908)

He wrote two of the earlier volumes of Ernest Lavisse's Histoire de France.

== Assessment ==
Kirby Page writes in Jesus or Christianity (1929):

Professor Achille Luchaire expressed the opinion that "the clerics of the Middle Ages showed almost as much cruelty to the peasants and burghers as did the men of the sword."
