= Abandonment (film) =

1940 film

- Spanish film poster
- Directed by: Mario Mattoli
- Written by: Mario Mattoli; Stefano Vanzina
- Produced by: Gaetano Rizzardi
- Starring: Corinne Luchaire; George Rigaud; Maria Denis
- Cinematography: Jan Stallich
- Edited by: Mario Serandrei
- Music by: Salvatore Allegra
- Production company: Grandi Film
- Distributed by: Grandi Film; Francinex (France)
- Release date: 18 September 1940
- Running time: 100 minutes
- Country: Italy
- Language: Italian

Abandonment (Italian: Abbandono) is a 1940 Italian historical drama film directed by Mario Mattoli and starring Corinne Luchaire, George Rigaud and Maria Denis. It was shot at the Cinecittà Studios in Rome. The film's sets were designed by the art director Guido Fiorini.

== Plot ==
In the 1830s, there is shock when the son of a wealthy shipowner returns from a distant voyage with a new wife.

== Cast ==
- Corinne Luchaire as Anna
- George Rigaud as Capitano Stefano Courier
- Maria Denis as Maria, sua sorella
- Camillo Pilotto as Moran
- Lia Orlandini as La signora Courier
- Osvaldo Valenti as Leonard
- Enrico Glori as Il marito di Maria
- Sandro Ruffini as Pierre Courier
- Giulietta De Riso as Dolores
- Nerio Bernardi as Ridaud
- Carlo Duse as Richard
- Nino Marchesini as Il medico

== Production ==
The film, one of the few dramas directed by the Tolentino-based director, was shot in the Cinecittà facilities.

The male lead George Rigaud was credited in the titles with the Italianized name Giorgio Rigato.

The Commission of Cinematographic Revision granted clearance for theatrical circulation without making any cuts had censor visa No. 31,039 in July 5, 1940, for an ascertained length of the film of 2,752 meters and was presented at the 8th Venice International Film Festival.

== Bibliography ==
- Enrico Lancia & Fabio Melelli. Attori stranieri del nostro cinema. Gremese Editore, 2006.
