= Wolves of Wall Street =

- 2006 Region 2 DVD cover
- Directed by: David DeCoteau
- Written by: Barry L. Levy
- Produced by: Sylvia Hess (producer); Roberta Friedman; Jeffrey Schenck (co-producers); Eddy Collyns (line producer); Paul Colichman; Andreas Hess; Stephen P. Jarchow (executive producers)
- Starring: Jeff Branson; Louise Lasser; William Gregory Lee; Angela Pietropinto; John Michaelson; Mary Elaine Monti; Eric Roberts
- Music by: Harry Manfredini
- Distributed by: DEJ Productions; Regent Worldwide Sales LLC (worldwide)
- Release date: December 31, 2002
- Running time: 85 minutes
- Country: United States
- Language: English

Wolves of Wall Street is a 2002 American horror film directed by David DeCoteau.

== Plot ==
On the advice of a bartender familiar with the Wall Street crowd, Jeff Allen (William Gregory Lee) applies to the Wolfe Brothers brokerage firm in New York City for his dream job as a stock broker. What he does not know is that the brokers are werewolves, and he is bitten, thus he "joins the pack". He is forced to abandon his love and values for cunning and instinct during which time he cheats on his girlfriend, Annabella, and brutally kills and eats various humans. After a change of heart, he finds that leaving the brotherhood is harder than joining.

Jeff goes to Annabella's friend's birthday party, and a drunk tries hitting on Annabella. Jeff rips a piece out of the neck of the drunk and then chases his girlfriend back to her apartment and bites her, transforming her into a werewolf too. Annabella had given him a silver pen when he first started as an intern at the Wolfe Brothers firm, and he goes back to the headquarters and he tries to quit, but his mentor, Dyson Keller, refuses to let him go. Jeff leaves anyway, but the werewolves led by Vince, go to Annabelle's apartment and seize her. They force him to return to headquarters, and he stabs the person he thought was the alpha but he was wrong, and a fight ensues during which he and his girlfriend kill all of the werewolves, and then they start walking away. The alpha who they thought they had killed, opens his eyes a split second before the end of the film, showing that they were not successful.

== Cast ==
- Jeff Branson as Tyler
- William Gregory Lee as Jeff Allen
- Elisa Donovan as Annabella Morris
- Michael Bergin as Vince
- Jason-Shane Scott as Meeks
- Bradley Stryker as Kennison
- Louise Lasser as the Landlady
- Eric Roberts as Dyson Keller

== Release ==
The film was a selection in the William Shatner DVD Club, a mail order club for independent sci-fi and horror films that operated for just under a year.
