= Prison Without Bars =

- Directed by: Brian Desmond Hurst
- Written by: Arthur Wimperis; Margaret Kennedy (dialogue)
- Based on: play by Egon Eis; Otto Eis; Gina Kaus; Hans Wilhelm
- Produced by: Alexander Korda
- Starring: Corinne Luchaire; Edna Best; Barry K. Barnes
- Cinematography: Georges Périnal; Bernard Browne
- Edited by: William Hornbeck; Charles Crichton
- Music by: John Greenwood
- Production company: London Film Productions
- Distributed by: United Artists Corporation (UK)
- Release dates: 21 September 1938 (London, UK); 9 April 1939 (US)
- Running time: 72 minutes
- Country: United Kingdom
- Language: English

Prison Without Bars is a 1938 British black-and-white crime film directed by Brian Desmond Hurst and starring Corinne Luchaire, Edna Best and Barry K. Barnes. It was written by Arthur Wimperis and Margaret Kennedy based on the 1936 play Gefängnis ohne Gitter by Gina Kaus, previously filmed as Prison sans Barreaux (1938), aso starring Luchaire.

== Synopsis ==
A young progressive thinking woman becomes superintendent at a French girl's reformatory dominated by the harsh previous head. A young girl is blackmailed by her acquaintance over her love for the superintendent's fiancé, but is released to join him in the end, when all is revealed.

== Cast ==
- Corinne Luchaire as Suzanne Duplat
- Edna Best as Yvonne Chanel
- Barry K. Barnes as Dr George Marechal
- Mary Morris as Renee
- Lorraine Clewes as Alice
- Sally Wisher as Julie Picard
- Martita Hunt as Mme Appel
- Margaret Yarde as Mlle Arthemise
- Elsie Shelton as Mme Remy
- Glynis Johns as Nina
- Enid Lindsey as Mlle Renard
- Phyllis Morris as Mlle Pauline
- Nancy Roberts as Mlle Dupont

== Critical reception ==
The Monthly Film Bulletin wrote: "Reformatory drama, an English version of a French film in which the settings and names of the original are kept. ... [the] story is dramatically presented, though the pseudo-French atmosphere occasionally weakens conviction."

Variety wrote: "Prison Without Bars, remade from the French, is a strong film that should appeal to better-class audiences ... It's in the transition from the French to the English that the filmization falters slightly, pace being slowed."

In The New York Times, Frank S. Nugent dismissed the film as "another prison picture, and while we would not want to pass too harsh a sentence upon it, neither can we fairly pretend that it is innocent."

In December 1938, The Daily Telegraph selected it as one of their ten best films of the year.
