= The Last Turning =

1939 film by Pierre Chenal

- Directed by: Pierre Chenal
- Written by: Sabine Berritz; Charles Spaak; Henry Torrès
- Based on: The Postman Always Rings Twice by James M. Cain
- Produced by: Charles Smadja
- Starring: Fernand Gravey; Corinne Luchaire; Michel Simon
- Cinematography: Christian Matras; Claude Renoir
- Edited by: Borys Lewin
- Music by: Jean Wiener
- Production company: Gladiator Productions
- Distributed by: Lux Compagnie Cinématographique de France
- Release date: 17 May 1939
- Running time: 90 minutes
- Country: France
- Language: French

The Last Turning (French: Le Dernier tournant) is a 1939 French film noir directed by Pierre Chenal and starring Fernand Gravey, Corinne Luchaire and Michel Simon. It was shot at the Joinville Studios in Paris. The film's sets were designed by the art director Georges Wakhévitch. The screenplay was written by Charles Spaak and Henry Torrès, based on the 1934 novel The Postman Always Rings Twice by James M. Cain. It was the first screen adaptation of the novel followed by the 1943 film Ossessione and The Postman Always Rings Twice in 1946.

== Cast ==
- Fernand Gravey as Frank
- Michel Simon as Nick Marino
- Corinne Luchaire as Cora Marino
- Marcel Vallée as Le juge
- Robert Le Vigan as Le cousin maître-chanteur
- Etienne Decroux as Le patron du bistrot
- Florence Marly as Madge, la dompteuse
- Jean-François Martial as L'architecte
- Pierre Labry as Un camionneur
- Georges Péclet as L'assureur
- Auguste Bovério as Le prêtre
- Pierre Sergeol as L'avocat
- René Bergeron as Le commissaire
- Marcel Duhamel as Le monsieur pressé
- Charles Blavette as Un camionneur
- Serge Nadaud as Le motard
- Georges Douking as Un joueur
- Fred Pasquali as Un joueur
- Georges Paulais as Le greffier
- Yvonne Yma as La femme

== Bibliography ==
- Hodgson, Michael. Patricia Roc. Author House, 2013.
- Walker-Morrison, Deborah. Classic French Noir: Gender and the Cinema of Fatal Desire. Bloomsbury Publishing, 2020.
