= Three Hours (1939 film) =

1939 film by Léonide Moguy

Three Hours is a 1939 French film directed by Léonide Moguy.

It was known in France as Je t'attendrai ('I will wait for you'), after an original title of Le déserteur ('The deserter') was censored.

It was released in the US in 1944.

== Cast ==
- Jean-Pierre Aumont
- Corinne Luchaire
- Édouard Delmont
