= Jean Luchaire =

French journalist and politician (1901–1946)

- Jean Luchaire and his daughter Corinne arrested in Italy in 1945 by American forces
- Born: July 21, 1901; Siena, Italy
- Died: 22 February 1946 (aged 44); Fort de Châtillon, Châtillon, France
- Spouse: Françoise Besnard
- Children: Corinne Luchaire

Jean Luchaire (French pronunciation: [ʒɑ̃ lyʃɛʁ]; 21 July 1901 – 22 February 1946) was a French journalist and politician who became the head of the French collaborationist press in Paris during the German military occupation. Luchaire supported the Révolution nationale declared by the French Government after it relocated to the spa town of Vichy in 1940.

== Family ==
Jean Luchaire was born in Siena, Italy, a grand-nephew of historian Achille Luchaire. He was married, with four children.

He was the son of Lucien Luchaire and his wife Fernande Dauriac. Lucien was an Italianist and founder of the Institut français in Florence, and was an animator of the Revue des nations latines from 1916 to 1919. The couple later divorced and, in 1916, Dauriac married Gaetano Salvemini, an Italian socialist, anti-fascist politician, historian and writer, who collaborated with the Revue des nations latines.

== Inter-war years ==
Before World War II Luchaire frequented the French Chamber of Deputies, where he began a strong association with Aristide Briand, known for the Kellogg–Briand Pact. Luchaire's newspaper supported Briand's policy for a rapprochement with Germany (while it was still the Weimar Republic). Manchester Guardian journalist Robert Dell is on record as saying that Luchaire was "most frightfully corrupt", and in 1934 Foreign Minister Louis Barthou related that Luchaire was receiving "quite incredible" subsidies for his newspaper Notre Temps (which Luchaire had founded in 1927); some 100,000 francs a month from Joseph Paul-Boncour.

Jean Luchaire first met and became friends with German francophile Otto Abetz in 1930, when Abetz was still living in Karlsruhe. Abetz would go on to marry Luchaire's secretary, Suzanne, and became German Ambassador in Paris during World War II. Luchaire was convinced that the appointment of Abetz as Ambassador to Paris was a godsend to France, and that he and Abetz could lessen the severity of the German military occupation and prepare the ground for a happy Franco-German union. He suggested that, in effect, he was adapting his old Briandism to new conditions.

== Vichy years ==
Pierre Laval, aware of Luchaire's friendly relations with Abetz, sent him to Paris in July 1940 to re-establish contact with him. Luchaire consistently maintained that he represented a certain respectable "rightist" anti-British French political tradition. He founded a further newspaper, the evening daily Les Nouveaux Temps, in 1940, and subsequently became the President of the Association de la presse parisienne (Association of the Parisian Press) in 1941 and presided over the Corporation nationale de la presse française (National Corporation of French Press). During the occupation, however, it was claimed that Luchaire was disseminating Nazi propaganda, fulminating against England, America, de Gaulle, the Soviet Union, Bolshevism and the Maquis. By the end of 1943 he advocated a "real" collaborationist government, Laval being, in his opinion, "inadequate". During the occupation, as editor of Nouveaux Temps, he drew a salary of 100,000 francs a month, besides 'extras', lived in great luxury, lunched at the Tour d'Argent and according to his daughter Corinne, even started keeping expensive mistresses, which he had not done in the past.

In 1944, Luchaire called on the Germans to "exterminate" the French Resistance, and his newspapers wrote violent anti-British and anti-American articles after the Normandy landings. He was appointed Minister of Information in the French government-in-exile, after the Germans forcibly removed it from Vichy to the Sigmaringen enclave, 1944–1945, where, apparently, he continued to be optimistic. He fled to Italy in 1945, but later was arrested and returned to France where he was tried and executed.

Luchaire's daughter Corinne had become a film actress in the 1930s. Following her father's "joke trial", she regarded him as a martyr, "who had never wanted to harm anyone, who was sincere, and who never thought unkindly of any man." In 1946, she was sentenced to 10 years of dégradation nationale. She died of tuberculosis in 1950.

== Cinema ==
Jean Luchaire was portrayed by Jean Dujardin in the 2026 film The Rays and Shadows.

== Bibliography ==
- Cédric Meletta, Jean Luchaire. l'enfant perdu des années sombres, , Paris, Perrin, 2013, 450 p.
- Martin Mauthner, Otto Abetz and His Paris Acolytes - French Writers Who Flirted with Fascism, 1930–1945. Liverpool University Press, 2016, (ISBN 978-1-84519-784-1)
