= Just Looking =

1999 American film by Jason Alexander

- Film poster
- Directed by: Jason Alexander
- Written by: Marshall Karp
- Produced by: Jean Doumanian
- Starring: Patti LuPone; Ryan Merriman; Gretchen Mol; Peter Onorati
- Cinematography: Fred Schuler
- Edited by: Norman Hollyn
- Production companies: Angel Ark Productions; Jean Doumanian Productions Inc.
- Distributed by: Sony Pictures Classics
- Release date: October 22, 1999
- Running time: 97 minutes
- Country: United States
- Language: English

Just Looking is a 1999 American comedy-drama film. Directed by Jason Alexander and written by Marshall Karp, it stars Ryan Merriman, Gretchen Mol, Peter Onorati, and Patti LuPone. The film's plot follows Lenny, a teenage boy from the Bronx who is sent to Queens to live with his aunt and new uncle for one summer in the 1950s. Since Lenny is hormonal and curious about sex, his goal for the summer is to “witness an act of love”.

The film premiered in October 1999 at the Hamptons International Film Festival and received a limited theatrical release in October 2000.

== Plot ==
Lenny is a 14-year-old boy living in the Bronx in 1955. Like every teenage boy, he is totally fascinated with the concept of sex. But Lenny is too young and scared to actually "do it”, so he dedicates his summer vacation to the next best thing—seeing two other people in an “act of love”, which proves to be easier said than done. Caught in the act of spying, his mother Sylvia and stepfather ship him off to spend the summer with his Aunt Norma and Uncle Phil in "the country"—Queens.

Lenny's plan looks like a bust and his summer seems destined for boredom until he meets a whole new group of friends, young teens who dub themselves a "sex club." While his new friends don't actually do it either and instead just talk about sex, they have a lot more interesting information than what was available to Lenny back in the Bronx. Then Lenny meets Hedy, a gorgeous nurse twice his age and a former model for bra ads. Lenny is both smitten and inspired, and his goal for the summer kicks into high gear. Lenny's adolescent fascination with sex turns into a deeper story about growing up, betrayal, loneliness, and defining what an “act of love” really is.

== Cast ==
- Ryan Merriman as Lenny
- Gretchen Mol as Hedy
- Patti LuPone as Sylvia
- Peter Onorati as Phil
- Ilana Levine as Norma
- Richard V. Licata as Polinsky
- John Bolger as Donald

== Reception ==
Just Looking has a 45% approval rating on review aggregate website Rotten Tomatoes. In a mixed review, Stephen Holden of The New York Times wrote, “Just Looking is a candy-colored, unabashedly sentimental movie whose characters, for all their flaws, are basically decent people doing their best in sparer times than today. As in so many retrospective rite-of-passage movies, the film's view of the past is the smoothed-out double vision of a grown-up reliving his own adolescence but with an adult perspective that discerns structure and meaning in events. The film's lovely performances embody this double vision”. However, he critiqued the storytelling and tone as “a little too sugary…to be a period classic like Barry Levinson's ‘Diner’”.

Marjorie Baumgarten of The Austin Chronicle wrote though “Just Looking won't become a mainstay of the prolific coming-of-age drama, but, as its title indicate, it may be worth a perusal—especially if you're tired of the way teen sexuality is portrayed in movies from the post-Porky's generations”.
