= Britt Lower =

American actress (born 1985)

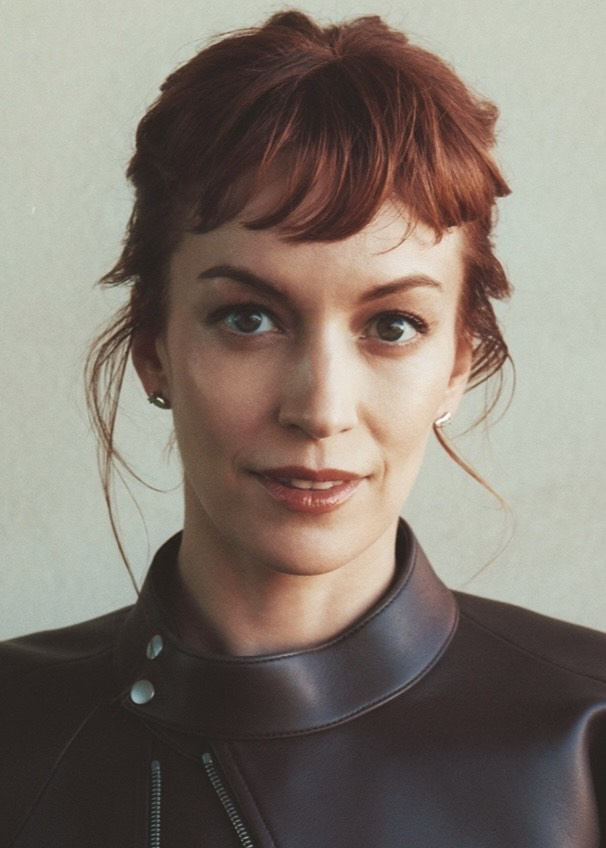
- Lower in 2025
- Born: Brittney Leigh Lower; August 2, 1985 (age 41); Bloomington, Illinois, U.S.
- Education: Northwestern University (BSc)
- Occupation: Actress
- Years active: 2008–present
- Spouse: Kenna Kennor (m. 2024)
- Website: brittlower.com

Brittney Leigh Lower (/laʊər/; born August 2, 1985) is an American actress. She is best known for her roles in the crime drama series Unforgettable (2011–2014), the romantic comedy series Man Seeking Woman (2015–2017), and the sci-fi series Severance (2022–present), the last of which earned her a Primetime Emmy Award for Outstanding Lead Actress in a Drama Series in 2025.

== Early life and education ==
Brittney Leigh Lower was born in Bloomington, Illinois, the daughter of Mickey and Steve Lower. Lower lived in Heyworth, Illinois and graduated from Heyworth High School. Her mother was a home economics teacher at Clinton Junior High School in Clinton, Illinois. As of 2012 she was running a face painting business, known throughout Central Illinois as "the Zoo Lady", which Britt occasionally joined, and Britt later cited it as where she "first encountered circus performers and artists who live on the road and work on the road as a living [and] just became totally enamored by the tightrope walkers and jugglers". She has an older brother named Brugh.

After graduating as the valedictorian from Heyworth High School in 2004, she earned a BSc in Communication from Northwestern University in 2008. She also worked with the Upright Citizens Brigade and ImprovOlympic.

== Career ==
Lower had a recurring role as technology expert Tanya Sitkowsky in the 2011 series Unforgettable. In 2015, she had her breakout role as Liz Greenberg in the FXX comedy series Man Seeking Woman. In 2016, she had a recurring role as Sarah Finn in the second season of the Hulu series Casual. She later appeared in the second season of American Horror Stories and portrayed the main character in the music video for the Yeah Yeah Yeahs song "Wolf". She also starred in commercials for Verizon and was a guest on The George Lucas Talk Show.

Lower has starred as Helly R. in the Apple TV+ sci-fi psychological thriller series Severance since 2022. With an interest in the circus world stemming from her mother's face painting career, and her own research for the 2020 short film Circus Person, which she wrote and directed, Lower spent a month playing a character in Circus Flora's Quest for the Innkeeper's Cask show in St. Louis during the three-year hiatus between the first and second seasons of Severance.

== Personal life ==
Lower married British hairstylist Kenna Kennor in 2024. They met when he styled her hair for the 74th Primetime Emmy Awards ceremony. The two live in Brooklyn, with his two children from a previous marriage.

== Filmography ==
=== Film ===
Year	Title	Role	Notes
2008	Imogen	Natalie	Short film
2010	Benny to Benny	May	Short film
2010	Spark	Suze	Short film
2012	Revenge for Jolly!	Mary Ann	
2012	The Letter	Kathleen	
2012	The Worst	Ryan	Short film
2012	Roomie	Sarah	Short film
2013	Beside Still Waters	Olivia	
2013	Mutual Friends	Trish	
2013	One Trick Dieter	Ellen	Short film
2014	Re: Jess	Jess	Short film
2015	The Shells	Alex	
2015	Those People	Ursula	
2015	Sisters	Mrs. Geernt	
2015	Don't Worry Baby	Anna	
2016	How to Lose Weight in 4 Easy Steps	Rachael	Short film
2016	Swell	Ana	Short film
2016	Domain	Phoenix/Kimberley Miller	
2016	The Shadow Hours	Dorothy	Short film
2017	Mr. Roosevelt	Celeste Jones	
2018	Faith	Padma	Short film
2018	The Shadow Hours	Dorothy	Short film
2018	Staycation	Jill	Short film
2018	A Civilized Life	Jack	Short film
2020	Circus Person	Ava	Also director, writer, and executive producer
2020	Holly Slept Over	Audra	
2022	Show Pony	Kate	Short film
2023	Until the Wedding	Naomi	
2024	Psycho Therapy: The Shallow Tale of a Writer Who Decided to Write About a Serial Killer	Suzie	Also executive producer
2024	Darkest Miriam	Miriam Gordon	
2026	Sender	Julia	Also executive producer

=== Television ===
Year	Title	Role	Notes
2010	Big Lake	Meg	7 episodes
2011–2014	Unforgettable	Tanya Sitkowsky	13 episodes
2012	A Gifted Man	Nina	Episode: "In Case of (Re)Birth"
2012	Law & Order: Special Victims Unit	Jess Hardwick	Episode: "Strange Beauty"
2015–2017	Man Seeking Woman	Liz Greenberg	Main role
2016	Bad Internet	Rayne	Episode: "The Seven Billionth Wheel"
2016	Casual	Sarah Finn	Recurring role
2017	Wrecked	Margot Wallace	Episode: "Ransom"
2017	Pillow Talk	Emma	4 episodes
2017–2018	Ghosted	Claire Jennifer	3 episodes
2017–2019	Future Man	Jeri Elizabeth Lang	5 episodes
2018	WASP	Desiree	Episode: "Joshua Tree Was Amahzing"
2019	High Maintenance	Lee	4 episodes
2019	It's Always Sunny in Philadelphia	Lisa	Episode: "The Gang Gets Romantic"
2020–2024	The George Lucas Talk Show	Herself	2 episodes
2022	American Horror Stories	Fay Mallow	Episode: "Facelift"
2022	The Late Show with Stephen Colbert	No-One's Mother	Episode: "Kerry Washington/Joe Walsh"
2022–present	Severance	Helena Eagan / Helly R.	Main role
2026	I Will Find You	Rachel Mills	Main role

=== Music videos ===
Year	Song	Artist
2022	"Wolf"	Yeah Yeah Yeahs

=== Video games ===
Year	Title	Role
2020	NBA 2K21	Alex Williams (voice)

== Awards and nominations ==
Year	Award	Category	Work	Result	Ref.
2017	FilmQuest	Best Supporting Actress – Feature	Domain	Nominated	
2020	Nashville Film Festival	Audience Award	Circus Person	Won	
2022	Hollywood Critics Association Awards	Best Actress in a Streaming Series, Drama	Severance	Won (Note: Tied with Laura Linney for Ozark)	
2022	Saturn Awards	Best Actress in a Streaming Series	Severance	Nominated	
2022	Gotham Awards	Outstanding Performance in a New Series	Severance	Nominated	
2023	Screen Actors Guild Awards	Outstanding Performance by an Ensemble in a Drama Series	Severance	Nominated	
2025	Canadian Screen Awards	Best Performance in a Leading Role, Drama	Darkest Miriam	Nominated	
2025	Astra Awards	Best Actress in a Drama Series	Severance	Nominated	
2025	Critics' Choice Super Awards	Best Actress in a Science Fiction/Fantasy Series, Limited Series or Made-for-TV Movie	Severance	Won	
2025	TCA Awards	Individual Achievement in Drama	Severance	Nominated	
2025	Primetime Emmy Awards	Outstanding Lead Actress in a Drama Series	Severance	Won	
2026	Critics' Choice Television Awards	Best Actress in a Drama Series	Severance	Nominated	
2026	Golden Globe Awards	Best Actress – Television Series Drama	Severance	Nominated	
2026	Actor Awards	Outstanding Performance by a Female Actor in a Drama Series	Severance	Nominated	
2026	Actor Awards	Outstanding Performance by an Ensemble in a Drama Series	Severance	Nominated	
2026	Satellite Awards	Best Actress in a Drama or Genre Series	Severance	Nominated	
2026	Saturn Awards	Best Actress on Television	Severance	Nominated	
