= Ossessione =

1943 film by Luchino Visconti

- Original film poster
- Directed by: Luchino Visconti
- Screenplay by: Luchino Visconti; Mario Alicata; Giuseppe De Santis; Gianni Puccini; Uncredited: Alberto Moravia; Antonio Pietrangeli
- Based on: The Postman Always Rings Twice; 1934 novel by James M. Cain (uncredited)
- Produced by: Libero Solaroli
- Starring: Clara Calamai; Massimo Girotti; Juan de Landa
- Cinematography: Aldo Tonti; Domenico Scala
- Edited by: Mario Serandrei
- Music by: Giuseppe Rosati
- Production company: Industrie Cinematografiche Italiane
- Distributed by: Industrie Cinematografiche Italiane
- Release date: 16 May 1943
- Running time: 135 minutes
- Country: Italy
- Language: Italian

Ossessione (Italian pronunciation: [ossesˈsjoːne]; "Obsession") is a 1943 Italian crime drama film directed and co-written by Luchino Visconti, in his directorial debut. It is an unauthorized and uncredited adaptation of the 1934 novel The Postman Always Rings Twice by American author James M. Cain, and stars Clara Calamai, Massimo Girotti, and Juan de Landa in the leading roles. It is often considered to be the first Italian neorealist film, though there is some debate about whether such a categorization is accurate.

Banned and ostracized by the Fascist regime during its initial release, the Italian Ministry of Culture has since placed Ossessione on its list of 100 Italian films to be saved, distinguishing films which "changed the collective memory of the country between 1942 and 1978."

== Plot ==
Gino Costa, a wandering tramp, stops at a small roadside tavern and petrol station in the Po Valley, run by Giovanna Bragana and her older husband, Giuseppe. Giovanna is disgusted by her husband, having married him only for his money, and is instantly drawn to the younger and more attractive Gino. Giovanna serves Gino a meal, but they are interrupted by Giuseppe, who throws Gino out. Giovanna claims Gino did not pay, pocketing his money, as an excuse for him to return. Giuseppe chases after Gino, only to find that Gino has no money left, so Gino offers to fix Giuseppe's vehicle as payment for the meal, and the two bond over shared military service as Bersaglieri.

When Giuseppe leaves to pick up a part for the vehicle, Gino and Giovanna confess their feelings to each other and begin an affair. Giuseppe, completely oblivious to the situation, takes a liking to Gino and tells him that he can stay and help out around the tavern. After a few days, Gino tries to convince Giovanna to run away with him. Giovanna initially agrees, but on the way to the train station she changes her mind and refuses to go through with it, so Gino leaves without her.

While Gino is on the train, he is confronted by the ticket inspector and admits that he has neither a ticket nor money. "Lo Spagnolo" ("The Spaniard"), a traveling street entertainer, steps in to pay for his train ticket and the two become friends. When they reach the city of Ancona, Gino spends a night at an inn with Spagnolo, where he reveals that he cannot stop thinking about Giovanna. When Spagnolo learns that Giovanna refuses to leave her husband because she fears having no money and security, he advises Gino to "run far away" and forget about Giovanna. Later that night, Spagnolo lights a cigarette and holds the match up in the dark bedroom to watch Gino while he sleeps.

Gino stays in Ancona and gets a job holding up an advertisement sign for Spagnolo. One day, Giuseppe and Giovanna run into Gino by chance, and the three go to a bar where Giuseppe sings in a voice competition. While he is on stage, Gino confesses to Giovanna that he tried to forget her but could not and tries again to convince her to leave with him. Even though Giovanna still has feelings for Gino, she refuses and tells him that she will stay with her husband, to which he angrily replies, "Then I'll come back to the store. Is that what you want?"

After the voice competition, Gino, Giuseppe, and Giovanna leave together to return to the Braganas' tavern. Giuseppe has been celebrating his successful singing performance and is quite drunk. Gino and Giovanna take advantage of his inebriated state and conspire to murder him. They convince Giuseppe to let Gino drive and stage the murder as a traffic accident.

In the aftermath of their crime, tensions begin to arise. Gino wants to sell the tavern and leave, while Giovanna wants to stay and run the tavern. Gino feels guilty about the murder, and his guilt is amplified by the fact that he is now living in the home of the man he killed. This causes him to feel trapped and he acts coldly toward Giovanna.

Giovanna hosts a party at the tavern to increase business, and Spagnolo shows up at the party. Gino is initially happy to see his friend, but he becomes agitated when Spagnolo tries to get him to leave and go traveling. Spagnolo implies that he knows of Gino's crime, and Gino loses his temper and punches Spagnolo. A bystander, who is actually a detective that has been investigating Gino and Giovanna, helps Spagnolo up. As Spagnolo walks away, Gino calls out to him, but he does not turn around.

In a brief scene, Spagnolo is seen as having arrived to speak to someone who works in an office at the police office.

One day while Gino and Giovanna are in town, Gino flirts with Anita, a young prostitute. Anita leaves, and Giovanna returns to Gino to tell him that Giuseppe had life insurance. This makes Gino feel that Giovanna has used him, and he feels even more guilt-ridden over the murder. He angrily yells at Giovanna that he does not want to be with her anymore and goes off to find Anita. Gino and Anita spend some time together in Anita's apartment before deciding to leave together to get some food. While they are outside, Giovanna, who has been sitting at a café outside Anita's apartment building, angrily confronts Gino. Anita runs off, and Giovanna threatens to tell the police that Gino killed Giuseppe if Gino does not stay with her. Gino loses his temper and hits Giovanna, causing a scene. He then goes back to Anita's apartment and confesses the crime to her.

Meanwhile, two men who arrived on the scene shortly after Giuseppe's death have contacted the police, and their description of events does not quite match that given by Gino and Giovanna. The detective who has been investigating the case is sent to bring Gino and Giovanna in for further questioning, but when Gino sees the detective outside Anita's apartment he is afraid Giovanna has gone to the police, so he convinces Anita to distract the detective and escapes by climbing across the roof to a neighboring building.

Gino returns to Giovanna at the tavern, where she tells him that she did not go to the police before saying she is pregnant with his child and still loves him. Shocked, Gino leaves and spends the night wandering alone. Giovanna searches for him and finds him the next day on the beach, by which point he seems to have come to terms with their crime and has new resolve to love Giovanna and try to build a life with her. After they make up and spend some romantic time together on the beach, Gino tells Giovanna about the detective and she finally agrees that they need to leave the tavern. They get in their car and depart, but, realizing the police are on their trail, they drive as fast as they can and end up tailgating a large truck. In a twist of fate, the truck knocks their car over the edge of the road and into a river, killing Giovanna. Devastated, Gino carries her body out of the wreckage and surrenders to the police.

== Cast ==
- Clara Calamai as Giovanna Bragana
- Massimo Girotti as Gino Costa
- Juan de Landa as Giuseppe Baragana
- Dhia Cristiani as Anita
- Elio Marcuzzo as 'Lo Spagnolo' ('The Spaniard'), a street performer
- Vittorio Duse as Police Agent
- Michele Riccardini as Don Remigio

== Production ==
=== Background ===
Working under the censorship of the Fascist Italian government, Visconti encountered problems with the production even before filming commenced. He had initially wanted to adapt a story by Giovanni Verga, the Italian realist writer and one of his greatest influences, but that project was turned down almost immediately by the Fascist authorities due to its subject matter, which revolved around bandits. Around this time, Visconti uncovered a French translation of The Postman Always Rings Twice that had been given to him by French director Jean Renoir while he was working in France in the 1930s.

=== Development and writing ===
Visconti adapted the novel with a group of men he selected from the Milanese magazine Cinema, which was edited by Vittorio Mussolini, Benito Mussolini's son. The members of this group were talented filmmakers and writers and played a large role in the emerging neorealist movement: Mario Alicata, Gianni Puccini, Antonio Pietrangeli, and Giuseppe De Santis. Many of the Cinema crew were open or covert antifascists, a fact both the older and younger Mussolini tolerated under the belief their presence was necessary for the Italian film industry to innovate and compete with its rivals elsewhere, so long as their politics did not overtly affect the content of their films. Several of the Cinema alumni, including Visconti, would later go underground and join the resistance.

=== Filming ===
Ossessione was filmed between the summer and autumn of 1942. The exteriors were shot on-location in and around the Po Valley and the commune of Ferrara. Filming locations included the settlements of Codigoro, Ancona, Comacchio and Boretto. The interiors were shot at S.A.F.A. Studios in Rome.

== Analysis ==
For the most part, Visconti retained the plot of the novel. He made changes such as tailoring the script to its Italian setting and adding a character (Lo Spagnolo), but the main departure from the novel and the defining characteristic of the film is the manner in which it confronts the realities of life.

Despite arguments about how to define neorealist cinema, one of Ossessione's aspects is its realism and, despite being popular actors of Italian cinema, the stars of the film, Massimo Girotti and Clara Calamai, deliver performances that are not glamorous. In one scene that anticipates a major theme of neorealism, Giovanna, Ossessione's central female character, enters her messy kitchen, serves herself a bowl of soup and sits down with a newspaper, only to fall asleep, slumped over in the midst of the confusion. At several moments like this one, Visconti slows the pace to give the viewer a glimpse into the routine of his characters and, in doing so, roots the narrative in the life of his characters.

In another scene, Gino, Giovanna, and Giuseppe are eating when Giuseppe comments that a local landowner has been shot from behind by a worker, believed to be the result of the worker's love for the landowner's wife. In this way, Visconti foreshadows the man's own death and illuminates the study of class tension that is woven fluidly into the film. Soon afterwards, Giuseppe submits to his wife's physical and verbal responses to cats crying outside and fetches his shotgun and leaves. Shortly after his exit, the adulterous lovers huddle close and hear gunshots, thereby hinting at the doom also reserved for the lovers "in heat".

The landscape itself is realistic, and Visconti takes great care to situate his characters in a rural Italy that remains for the most part unromanticized. Nearly the entire story is told using medium and long shots, with Visconti choosing to employ close-ups only at moments of intense emotion. Characters are depicted interacting with and moving around within their environment; to help create this effect, Visconti favors long and ponderous shots, while making use of depth of focus to highlight the variety of action occurring throughout the space of the frame. He resists identifying solely with one character and prefers instead to maintain a distance, taking them all in with his viewfinder as independent, but irrevocably tangled, components of a larger cast, which includes the sets, scenery, and landscape, as well as what goes on outside of the frame. Shots of the landscape largely consist of the dusty road winding into the distance and the interior shots are just as bleak; the dowdy kitchen exudes a nearly tangible film of dust and grime and the dingy hotel room that speaks, with each detail, of the rebellious freedom cherished by those who share it.

The shift of focus from the novel is clear even in Visconti's decision to change the title: whereas the novel's title alludes to the final retribution exacted upon the adulterous couple, Visconti's header bespeaks the focus of his film, obsessive passion. The lovers, Gino and Giovanna, played by Girotti and Calamai, first meet in the kitchen of the inn that Giovanna runs with her husband, the fat and dim-witted Giuseppe. It is in the symbolic and literal center of the family sphere, before they ever touch, that the two make a silent oath. Their love, tainted as it is by a lie, is difficult for either of them to bear, and the tension is only exacerbated by Giuseppe's overwhelming presence. Unable to continue the affair under such pretense, but genuinely in love, Gino tries to persuade Giovanna to leave with him. She is clearly tempted, but knows of the power the road has over Gino, a relationship that Visconti executes nearly as palpably as that between him and Giovanna. She ultimately refuses Gino, opting for the security and stability that Giuseppe has to offer, and Gino sets out once again unencumbered. When they cross paths some time later, it is in the city, and Giuseppe is extremely drunk, engaged in a singing competition. Against the backdrop of the drunken and foolish Giuseppe, the couple plans his death, an act they carry out in a car crash. Rather than granting them the freedom they so desperately seek, however, the murder only heightens the need for deception and makes more acute the guilt they had previously been dealing with. Despite Giovanna's attempt to construct a normal life with Gino, Giuseppe's presence seems to remain long after they return to the inn. Their already crumbling relationship reaches its bounds when they go to collect the money from Giuseppe's life insurance policy. They have a very hostile argument and Gino retaliates by engaging Anita, an attractive young prostitute. Though Giovanna is pregnant and there seems to be some hope for the couple, Gino is left alone to deal with the law when Giovanna is killed in the film's second car crash.

The character of Lo Spagnolo (The Spaniard), Visconti's main textual departure from the novel, plays a pivotal role in the story of Ossessione. After failing to convince Giovanna to flee with him, Gino meets Spagnolo after boarding a train to the city, and the two of them strike up an instant friendship, subsequently working and living together. Spagnolo is an actor who works as a street vendor and serves as a foil to Giovanna's traditionalism and inability to let go of the material lifestyle. In contrast to the other main characters, who come across as very real and thoroughly developed, Spagnolo operates chiefly on a symbolic level. He represents for Gino the possibility of a liberated masculinity living a successful life separate from society's impositions—an alternative to the life he is drawn toward in his relationship with Giovanna.

Both Giovanna and Gino are tragic characters in their inability to find a space in which to situate themselves comfortably. The limited roles made available by society prove to be insufficient in providing narratives for their lives that bring them closer to happiness. Giovanna is pulled away from the security of her marriage to the repulsive Giuseppe by a desire for true love and fulfillment, whose potential is actualized with the appearance of Gino. Her attempts to hold onto the fortune that came with marriage, however, ultimately lead to the failure of her relationship with Gino and perhaps, by extension, to her death. Gino's situation seems to be just as distinct, if not more so, as the force pulling him away from Giovanna is his fear of a traditional commitment. From the first time that they sleep together, after which Giovanna shares with Gino all of her deepest problems while he listens to the sound of waves in a seashell, it is clear that he answers only to the open road, identifying it as his alternative to becoming an active part of mainstream society. Spagnolo is the road manifest, masculine freedom in opposition to Giovanna's femininity, love, and family values. Caught in between the two conflicting ideals, Gino ends up violating both of them and dooming himself in the process.

Visconti's approach to filmmaking is very structured, and there are several parallel scenes in the film, such as the car crashes. Additionally, Gino angrily leaves Giovanna by the side of the road and is later abandoned by Spagnolo in a similar way, and Gino and Spagnolo sit side by side on a wall shortly after they meet, a scene that is repeated at the end of their friendship. Cinematic techniques, such as the instances in which Visconti foreshadows major plot twists or the introduction of Spagnolo as a counterweight, demonstrate Visconti's formalist streak and technical virtuosity, but his realist vision and taste for drama are truly what breathe life into Ossessione.

== Release and reception ==
=== Fascist reaction and ban ===
When Ossessione was completed and released in 1943, it was far from the innocent murder mystery the authorities had expected; after a few screenings in Rome and northern Italy, which prompted outraged reactions from Fascist and Church authorities, the film was banned by the Fascist government that had been reestablished in the German-occupied part of Italy after the September 1943 armistice. Eventually, the Fascists destroyed the film, but Visconti managed to keep a duplicate negative from which all existing prints have been made.

=== Post-war ===
After the war, Ossessione encountered more problems with mass distribution, both because Visconti had never obtained the rights to adapt Cain's novel as a result of the wartime production schedule and because Metro-Goldwyn Mayer produced an adaptation directed by Tay Garnett while the Fascist ban on Visconti's work was still in effect. Due to the copyright issues, the film was not released in the United States until 1976, but, despite the limited number of screenings, it was still able to gain acclaim among moviegoers who recognized in it some of the same sensibilities they had grown familiar with in neorealist films by Michelangelo Antonioni, Puccini, and De Santis, among others.
