= Jon Abbate =

American gridiron football player (born 1985)

No. 67, 45
- Position: Linebacker

Personal information
- Born: June 18, 1985 (age 41); Fort Lauderdale, Florida, U.S.
- Listed height: 5 ft 11 in (1.80 m)
- Listed weight: 245 lb (111 kg)

Career information
- High school: Harrison (Kennesaw, Georgia)
- College: Wake Forest
- NFL draft: 2007: undrafted

Career history
- Houston Texans (2007–2008); Montreal Alouettes (2009)*; Sacramento Mountain Lions (2010); Washington Redskins (2010)*; New Orleans Saints (2010)*
- * Offseason or practice squad member only

Awards and highlights
- First-team All-ACC (2006)

Jon Abbate (born June 18, 1985) is an American former football linebacker. He played college football at Wake Forest University in 2004–2006 and was signed as a free agent by the Houston Texans of the National Football League (NFL) in 2007.

== College career ==
After redshirting his first year in college, Abbate immediately became a starter in 2004. During that redshirt freshman season, Abbate had 101 tackles, including 13 tackles for a loss. In 2005, Abbate only had 76 tackles because of injury problems.

During the 2006 season, Abbate led the team in tackles with 120 (second in the ACC). He had a late interception in the endzone against rival University of North Carolina. In the ACC Championship in Jacksonville, Florida, Abbate had 15 tackles against the Georgia Tech Yellow Jackets. The Deacons won that game 9–6. Abbate was voted as the MVP of the game for ABC.

Abbate then played in the Orange Bowl against the University of Louisville. He had 15 tackles in that game, the first Bowl Championship Series bowl game participation for Wake Forest. Abbate was named an All-American (honorable mention, Sports Illustrated) and first-team All-ACC (ACSMA, College Football News) in recognition of his performance throughout his final season during which he averaged 8.6 tackles per game.

=== The 2006 season ===
On February 13, 2006, Abbate's 15-year-old brother, Luke, was seriously injured in a car accident on the way home from lacrosse practice, and died two days later. Before his junior season, Abbate asked head coach Jim Grobe whether he could switch his jersey number from 40 to 5, the number his brother had worn. Grobe agreed, and Abbate wore the number throughout his junior season. During the 2006 season, Abbate and his family would hold up five fingers before the start of the fourth quarter as a tribute to Luke. As the season progressed, Abbate's teammates, Wake Forest fans, and even fans of opposing teams began holding up five fingers as well—a tradition that attracted much media attention during the Deacons' successful year. Additionally, the Abbate family created the "Five Foundation" to raise awareness among young people of the responsibilities and dangers of driving. A movie about Jon Abbate, his brother Luke, and Wake Forest's 2006 football season, entitled The 5th Quarter, was released on March 25, 2011.

== Professional career ==
=== Houston Texans ===
At the conclusion of the 2006 season, Abbate decided to enter the 2007 NFL draft. "Unless someone could promise me if I went back that I'd grow three inches, the decision was pretty easy," Abbate said. "I could have gone back and been productive again, had another 100-plus tackles. But I'd be in the same situation with my height as a knock." Abbate was not drafted due to tearing his hamstring at the NFL combine but following the draft he signed a three-year contract with the Houston Texans as a free agent. The Texans converted him from linebacker to fullback.

Abbate was placed on season-ending injured reserve on September 1, 2007, with an ankle injury. He was waived after a failed physical on August 29, 2008. However, he was re-signed shortly after on March 1. He was waived again on July 22, 2008.

Abbate was re-signed by the Texans again on August 24, 2008, after wide receiver Harry Williams was placed on injured reserve.

=== Washington Redskins ===
Abbate was picked up by the Redskins in the 2010 offseason but was then released due to failing his physical.

=== New Orleans Saints ===
Abbate spent the remainder of the 2010 off season with the Saints after failing his physical with the Redskins.

=== Sacramento Mountain Lions ===
Abbate was on the roster of the Sacramento Mountain Lions (formerly known as the California Redwoods) for parts of the 2009 and 2010 seasons.
