= The Postman Always Rings Twice (1946 film) =

1946 film by Tay Garnett

- Poster for the theatrical release
- Directed by: Tay Garnett
- Screenplay by: Harry Ruskin; Niven Busch
- Based on: The Postman Always Rings Twice; 1934 novel by James M. Cain
- Produced by: Carey Wilson
- Starring: Lana Turner; John Garfield; Cecil Kellaway; Hume Cronyn
- Cinematography: Sidney Wagner
- Edited by: George White
- Music by: George Bassman; Erich Zeisl
- Production company: Metro-Goldwyn-Mayer
- Distributed by: Loew's Inc.
- Release date: May 2, 1946 (United States)
- Running time: 113 minutes
- Country: United States
- Language: English
- Budget: $1.6 million
- Box office: $5 million

The Postman Always Rings Twice is a 1946 American film noir directed by Tay Garnett and starring Lana Turner, John Garfield, and Cecil Kellaway. It is based on the 1934 novel of the same name by James M. Cain. This adaptation of the novel also features Hume Cronyn, Leon Ames and Audrey Totter. The musical score was written by George Bassman and Erich Zeisl (the latter uncredited).

This version was the third filming of The Postman Always Rings Twice, but the first under the novel's original title and the first in English. Previously, the novel had been filmed as Le Dernier Tournant (The Last Turning) in France in 1939 and as Ossessione (Obsession) in Italy in 1943.

== Plot ==
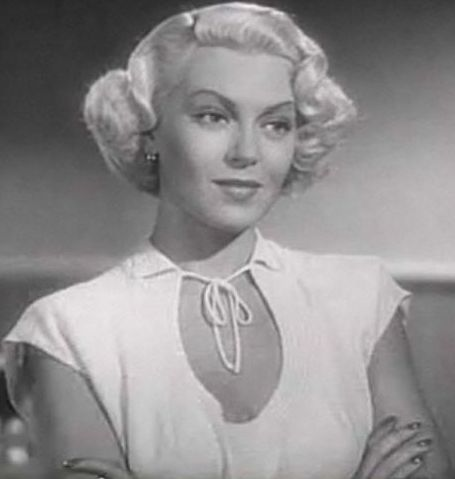
Lana Turner in the trailer for the film

Drifter Frank Chambers hitches a ride with District Attorney Kyle Sackett. Kyle drops Frank off at "Twin Oaks", a rural diner/service station on a highway in the hills outside Los Angeles. Frank begins working there. The diner is operated by the stodgy Nick Smith and his much younger wife, Cora.

Frank and Cora start to have an affair soon after meeting. Cora is tired of her situation, married to a man she does not love and working at a diner she wishes to own. While attempting to run away with Frank, Cora realizes that if she divorces Nick, she will end up with nothing. They return to Twin Oaks in time for her to retrieve the goodbye note she left in the cash register for Nick. Cora talks Frank into murdering Nick for them to have the diner. The plan involves Cora striking Nick with a sock full of ball-bearings and pretending he had fatally hit his head falling in the bathtub. Things go awry when a police officer stops by, and a cat causes a power outage. Cora eventually knocks Nick over the head and severely injures him.

It is determined that Nick will be all right, but no foul play is suspected, and he has no recollection of how he was struck. For a week, Frank and Cora happily run the business together. The officer stops by one day and tells Frank he passed Cora driving Nick back from the hospital. Frank sees no hope for a definite future with her and decides to move on before she returns. He goes to L.A. but after a couple of weeks, he starts hanging around the marketplace where Nick and Cora buy most of their produce, hoping to see her. He runs into Nick, who has been looking for him; Nick insists that Frank return to Twin Oaks with him, saying, "something important's gonna happen tonight, and you're in on it."

Upon Frank's return, Cora behaves coolly toward him; the three of them have dinner together, and Nick announces that he will be selling Twin Oaks and moving with Cora to care for his infirm sister in northern Canada. That night, Cora is desperate; Frank finds her in the kitchen with a knife she says she will use on herself. Frank agrees to kill Nick. The next day, the three of them are to drive to Santa Barbara to finalize the sale of Twin Oaks. Frank and Cora intend to stage a drunk driving crash. Sackett stops by to put air in his tire, and Frank and Cora stage an argument where she insists on driving because of the men's inebriation. On a deserted stretch of road, Frank kills Nick with a blow to the head and then sends the car off a cliff. However, Frank is also caught in the car and injured. Sackett, who followed them, arrives to find Cora crying for help.

The District Attorney files murder charges against only Cora, hoping to divide her and Frank. Although this ploy works temporarily, a measure by Cora's lawyer, Arthur Keats, prevents her full confession from coming into the hands of the prosecutor. Cora secures a plea bargain in which she pleads guilty to manslaughter and receives probation.

Publicity from the murder makes Twin Oaks successful, but things remain tense between Frank and Cora. They marry to protect themselves from being forced to testify against each other. When Cora leaves to care for her sick mother, Frank has a brief fling with a woman. After Cora returns, Kennedy, a man who worked as an investigator for her attorney, attempts to blackmail her with the confession. Frank beats up Kennedy and his partner, takes the signed confession from them, and burns it.

Cora tells Frank that she knows about his affair. The two argue but reconcile, and Cora announces that she is pregnant. She speculates that the new life they have created may balance the one they took. They go to the beach and swim, realizing they still love each other. On the way back, Frank accidentally crashes the car and Cora is killed.

Frank is tried and convicted for killing Cora. While on death row, he is visited by a priest and by Sackett, who confronts him with the evidence of his involvement in Nick's murder and reasons that if he resists his legal fate in Cora's death that he will only wind up back where he is with a conviction for Nick's murder. Frank accepts that, while he is innocent of Cora's death, his execution will be a fitting punishment for his murder of Nick.

== Cast ==
- Lana Turner as Cora Smith
- John Garfield as Frank Chambers
- Cecil Kellaway as Nick Smith
- Hume Cronyn as Arthur Keats
- Leon Ames as Kyle Sackett
- Audrey Totter as Madge Gorland
- Alan Reed as Ezra Liam Kennedy
- Jeff York as Blair
- Morris Ankrum as Judge Dudly Parkman (uncredited)
- Byron Foulger as Picnic Manager (uncredited)
- Frank Mayo as Bailiff (uncredited)

== Comparison to the novel ==
While many scenes and pieces of dialogue in the film are nearly identical to Cain's 1934 novel, the 1946 film adaptation takes a number of significant departures from the book.

Some of these changes are attributable to requirements of the Production Code Administration (PCA). Producer Carey Wilson and his screenwriters sent different versions of the script back and forth with the PCA until the group ultimately endorsed it. Given that the final script sanitized some of the graphic violence and sex of the novel, the filmmakers take steps to make the characters’ actions more rational. This rationalizing project does not apply to Cora, however. In the film, Cora takes on the role of femme fatale, a popular archetype in the film noir genre.

From the first scene, it is clear that protagonist and narrator Frank Chambers serves a different role than he did in the novel. In this scene, a well-dressed Frank Chambers is getting a ride to the Twin Oaks Tavern from the district attorney. He is seeking gainful employment at the restaurant. In the novel, however, he is a drifter who makes his way to the Twin Oaks by sneaking onto a hay truck before being caught and kicked off. Instead of looking for a job, Frank enters the restaurant and cons the restaurant’s proprietor into giving him a free meal.

In the novel, the restaurant’s proprietor is Nick Papadakis, a man of Greek origin. Cain draws attention to his outsider status by writing Nick’s dialogue in fractured English. Frank often refers to him simply as "the Greek" and throughout the novel, this Greek ethnicity is a source of distress for Cora. In their first conversation, Frank questions why Cora has married a Greek person. Later on, Cora resents Nick for his "greasiness" and becomes upset at the prospect of having children with him for fear of their children being greasy.

The filmmakers omit this racist element of the plot, changing the character’s name from Nick Papadakis to Nick Smith. Instead of race being the motivating factor for Cora’s dissatisfaction with the marriage, Nick’s frugality and lack of likability become the driving forces in the film adaptation. The film makes Nick out to be a "cheap, penny-pinching, stupid, and unlikeable man." This is a serious departure from the novel where at Nick’s funeral, Frank cries and reflects on how much he liked Nick.

The film adaptation downplays the sexual nature of Frank and Cora’s relationship and essentially removes any notion of their sadomasochistic tendencies. In the novel, Cain gives a visceral account of Frank and Cora’s first romantic encounter in which Frank, at Cora's request, bites her lips to the point of blood dripping down her neck. One of their more graphic sexual run-ins occurs after Frank and Cora have murdered Nick. To make it look like they too have been injured in the car crash, Frank hits Cora in the face and rips open her blouse then proceeds to have sex with her. Later on in the novel, Cora asks Frank to rip open her shirt the way he did on the night that they murdered Nick.

In the film, their romantic encounters play out very differently. After the killing of Nick, Frank and Cora do not have sex. Instead, they clumsily attempt to push the car off the side of the cliff and Frank becomes inadvertently injured in the process. Additionally, when overt sexuality appears in the film, it leads to punishment. In one of the final scenes of the film adaptation, Frank crashes the car because he is distracted by Cora and her sexual allure. Essentially, Cora dies because of lust. In the novel, the car crash is far more random. Cora’s death does not occur as a direct result of sexuality.

The conclusion of the film is far different from that of the novel. The filmmakers attempt to give the story a happy ending. The love that Frank still has for Cora appears redemptive and he asks a priest to pray that he and Cora can be together after death. Frank appears to listen both to the priest and to the district attorney. In the novel, Frank is stoic in handling his imminent execution. He hopes that he can reunite with Cora after death but is less trusting of the priest.

== Production ==
In early February 1934, before Cain's novel was published, RKO executive Merian C. Cooper submitted a synopsis of his story to the Production Code Administration (PCA), which reviewed movie scripts using the Motion Picture Production Code (commonly known as the Hays Code). Upon reviewing the synopsis, with its themes of adultery and murder, the PCA persuaded RKO to abandon its plans to film Cain's story, calling it "definitely unsuitable for motion picture production."

After Cain's novel was released, Columbia Pictures and Warner Bros. expressed interest in the property, but Warner Bros. quickly rejected the story out of concerns that a film version would run afoul of censors. Metro-Goldwyn-Mayer purchased the rights to make a movie adaptation a full twelve years prior to the film's release. They paid Knopf $25,000. Cain received half that amount, and it is the only money he ever received from the movie and its successful remake.

MGM did not go forward with the project earlier as the Hays Code began to be rigorously enforced very shortly after they had acquired the rights. The studio finally decided to proceed in 1944, upon observing the success of Paramount's film adaptation of Cain's novella Double Indemnity, which violated many of the same moral taboos.

Lana Turner's character, Cora Smith, wore all white in every scene, except for three in which she wore all black: with the knife in the kitchen contemplating suicide, at the train station returning from her mother's death, and when she was calling the taxicab so she could leave Frank.

In 1936, Cain adapted his novel as a play, which had 72 performances at the Lyceum Theatre, in New York, from February to April 1936. The cast included Richard Barthelmess as Frank, Mary Philips as Cora, Joseph Greenwald as Nick and Dudley Clements as Sackett, with minor roles played by Joseph Cotten and Charles Halton.

=== Casting ===
Lana Turner was cast as Cora Smith. Turner said this was a favorite role of hers. Cain felt that she was the perfect choice for Cora and was so impressed with her performance that he presented her with a leather-bound copy of the novel inscribed "For my dear Lana, thank you for giving a performance that was even finer than I expected." Bette Davis remarked "It's highway robbery that Miss Turner didn't get an Oscar nomination."

Joel McCrea was offered the role of Frank Chambers, but he turned it down. Gregory Peck was also considered for the role. John Garfield was borrowed from Warner Bros., and the veteran character actor Cecil Kellaway was borrowed from Paramount Pictures and was cast as Nick, Cora's husband.

=== Filming ===
Tay Garnett, the director, wanted to shoot in as many actual locations as possible, a rarity for MGM at the time. For the seaside love scenes, he took the cast and crew to Laguna Beach, where a persistent fog delayed filming for several days. Garnett moved production to San Clemente in search of clearer skies, only to have fog roll in there as well. Then, news was received that the fog had lifted at Laguna; but by the time the company arrived back there, the fog had returned. The frustration of waiting for the weather to clear caused Garnett, who was a recovering alcoholic, to fall off the wagon. Garnett holed up in his hotel room, where nobody could get him to stop drinking. Concerned about rumours that MGM was going to fire Garnett, Turner and Garfield decided to visit him on their own. Garnett would not listen to Garfield, but Turner managed to convince the director to go back to Los Angeles for treatment. When Garnett returned a week later, the fog had lifted, and filming resumed.

The on-set sexual tension between Garfield and Turner was apparent to the entire cast and crew of the film. Their first day together, Garfield called out to her, "Hey, Lana, how's about a little quickie?" to which she replied, "You bastard!" The two had a brief affair, according to the actor and director Vincent Sherman, a friend of Garfield's. Sherman said Turner was the only co-star with whom Garfield ever became romantically involved. There had been sparks between the two since the first day of shooting, and the delays had led to a close friendship. Finally, they shared a moonlit tryst on the beach, but it was their only night together. The two realized that whatever was happening on-screen, off-screen they had no sexual chemistry. They remained friends, nonetheless.

As originally written in the novel, the character of Madge was a lion tamer. Garnett even filmed the scene in which she introduces Frank to her cats. During shooting, a tiger sprayed the two stars, prompting John Garfield to jokingly ask for stunt pay.

== Reception ==
The film was a major hit, earning $3,741,000 in the US and Canada and $1,345,000 elsewhere, recording a profit of $1,626,000. Despite this, Louis B. Mayer head of MGM, who always preferred more wholesome, family oriented pictures, hated it.

=== Critical response ===
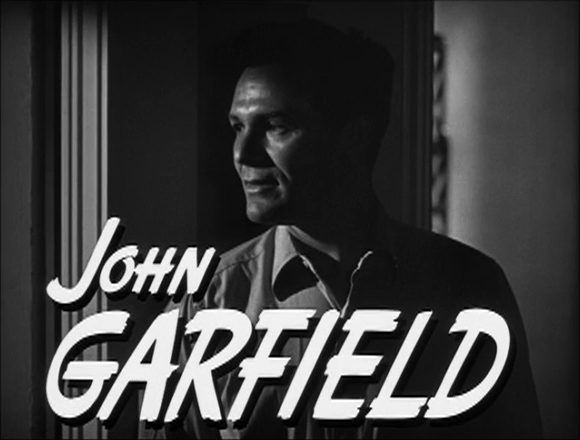
John Garfield from the trailer for the film

Bosley Crowther, film critic of The New York Times, gave the film a positive review and lauded the acting and direction of the film, writing, "Too much cannot be said for the principals. Mr. Garfield reflects to the life the crude and confused young hobo who stumbles aimlessly into a fatal trap. And Miss Turner is remarkably effective as the cheap and uncertain blonde who has a pathetic ambition to 'be somebody' and a pitiful notion that she can realize it through crime. Cecil Kellaway is just a bit too cozy and clean as Miss Turner's middle-aged spouse. He is the only one not a Cain character, and throws a few scenes a shade out of key. But Hume Cronyn is slyly sharp and sleazy as an unscrupulous criminal lawyer, Leon Ames is tough as a district attorney and Alan Reed plays a gum-shoe role well."

Variety wrote that the two leads gave "the best of their talents" to their roles, but agreed with Crowther in finding Kellaway's performance "a bit flamboyant at times in interpreting the character." Harrison's Reports wrote that "the story is unconvincing, but it has been produced well and acted capably." John McCarten of The New Yorker wrote: "Since the hero and heroine of the film are never dealt with sympathetically, the mating calls that preface their amour are monotonous. But once they get around to murder, things pick up and I'm confident you'll enjoy the resulting legal byplay that goes on between Hume Cronyn, as Miss Turner's lawyer, and Leon Ames, as the prosecuting attorney. As a matter of fact, Mr. Cronyn and Mr. Ames take most of the acting honors, and there is a decided letdown in the picture after a courtroom clash in which both of them participate with vast enthusiasm." Film critic James Agee was highly critical of the movie: "The Postman Always Rings Twice is mainly a terrible misfortune from start to finish... It looks to have been made in a depth of seriousness incompatible with the material, complicated by a paralysis of fear of the front office. It is, however, very interesting for just those reasons—it is what can happen, especially in Hollywood, if you are forced to try both to eat your cake and have it, and don't realize that it is, after all, only good pumpernickel." Pauline Kael wrote, "Entertaining, though overlong. The director, Tay Garnett, knew almost enough tricks to sustain this glossily bowdlerized version of the James M. Cain novel, and he used Lana Turner maybe better than any other director did."

Writing in 2000, critic Stephen MacMillan Moser appreciated Lana Turner's acting and wrote, "It is perhaps her finest work—from a body of work that includes very few truly stellar performances. She was a star, and not necessarily an actress, and because of that, so much of her work does not stand the test of time. She is best remembered for the spate of films like Peyton Place and Madame X that traded on her personal tragedies, but Postman, which predates all that, is a stunner—a cruel and desperate and gritty James Cain vehicle that sorely tests Lana's skills. But she succeeds marvelously, and from the first glimpse of her standing in the doorway in her white pumps, as the camera travels up her tanned legs, she becomes a character so enticingly beautiful and insidiously evil that the audience is riveted."

When asked by a reporter if he objected to what Hollywood had done to his 1934 novel The Postman Always Rings Twice, Cain replied: "They haven't done anything to my book. It's right up there on the shelf."—Biographer Roy Hoopes in Cain (1982).

On Rotten Tomatoes, the film holds an approval rating of 90% based on 29 reviews, with an average of 8.00/10. The website's critical consensus reads, "The Postman Always Rings Twice spins a sultry web of mystery with a gripping adaptation of a classic noir tale." Metacritic, which uses a weighted average, assigned the film a score of 84 out of 100, based on 10 critics, indicating "universal acclaim".

The film, considered a classic example of film noir, showcases the distinctive features of the genre: the femme fatale, an alienated and tragic antihero figure and a mutual plot against the female character's husband. The story is narrated by the antihero in the form of a voiceover recollection of events past. The aesthetic quality of the film creates an atmosphere of disorientation, rejection of traditional morality and overall pessimistic tone.

== Other adaptations ==
- Le Dernier Tournant (1939 French film) directed by Pierre Chenal
- Ossessione (1943 Italian film) directed by Luchino Visconti
- Cronaca di un Amore (1950 Italian film) directed by Michelangelo Antonioni
- Porto das Caixas (1962 Brazilian film) directed by Paulo Cesar Sarraceni
- The Postman Always Rings Twice (1981 film) directed by Bob Rafelson
- The Postman Always Rings Twice (1982 opera)
- Szenvedély (1997 Hungarian film) directed by György Fehér
- Jerichow (2008 German film) directed by Christian Petzold (in German)

== See also ==
- Payment Deferred – a 1926 novel and its 1932 film adaptation, which explore a similar theme
