= The Postman Always Rings Twice (novel) =

1934 crime novel by James M. Cain

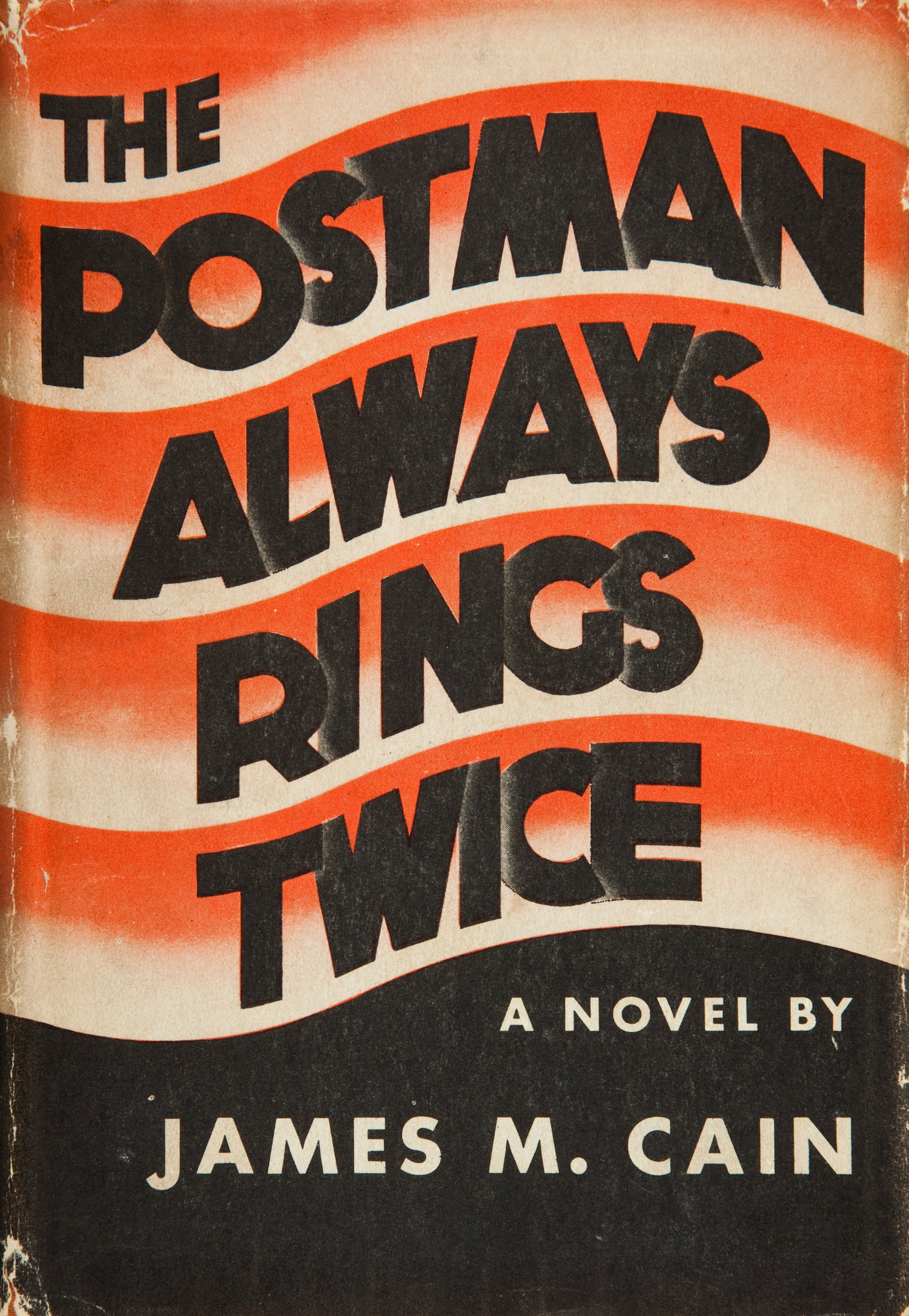
- Cover of the first edition
- Author: James M. Cain
- Language: English
- Genre: Crime novel, psychological thriller, roman noir
- Publisher: Alfred A. Knopf
- Publication date: 1934
- Publication place: United States
- Media type: Print (hardcover)
- ISBN: 978-0-679-72325-7

The Postman Always Rings Twice is a 1934 crime novel by American writer James M. Cain. The novel became successful and notorious upon publication. It is considered one of the most outstanding crime novels of the 20th century. The novel's mix of frank sexuality and violence was startling in its time and caused it to be banned in Boston.

It is included in the Modern Library's list of the 100 best novels, and it was published as an Armed Services Edition during World War II. The novel has been adapted for the screen seven times; the first American film version, released in 1946, is regarded as an important film noir.

The story owes a clear debt to Émile Zola's 1868 novel Thérèse Raquin, which has a similar plot.

== Plot ==
The story is narrated in the first person by Frank Chambers, a young drifter who stops at a rural California diner for a meal and ends up working there. The diner is operated by a beautiful young woman, Cora, and her much older husband, Nick Papadakis, sometimes called "the Greek".

Frank and Cora feel an immediate attraction to each other and begin a passionate affair with sadomasochistic qualities. Cora is tired of her situation, married to a man she does not love and working at a diner that she wants to own and improve. She and Frank scheme to murder Nick in order to start a new life together without Cora losing the diner.

The pair plan on striking Nick's head and making it seem as if he fell and drowned in the bathtub. Cora fells Nick with a solid blow, but a sudden power outage and the appearance of a policeman make the scheme fail. Nick recovers and, because of retrograde amnesia, does not suspect that he narrowly avoided being killed.

Still determined to kill Nick, Frank and Cora fake a car accident. They ply Nick with wine, strike him on the head and crash the car. Frank is also gravely injured in the crash, while Cora simulates minor injuries and bruises. The local district attorney suspects what has actually occurred but does not have enough evidence to prove it. As a tactic intended to get Cora and Frank to turn on each other, he charges only Cora with Nick's murder, coercing Frank to sign a complaint against her.

Cora, furious and indignant, insists on offering a full confession detailing both their roles. Her lawyer tricks her into dictating that confession to a member of his own staff. Cora, believing her confession made, returns to prison. Though she would be sure to learn of the trickery, a few valuable hours are gained. The lawyer uses the time to manipulate the insurance companies financially interested in the trial to have their private detective recant his testimony, which was the final remaining weapon in the prosecution's arsenal. The state is forced to grant Cora a plea agreement under which she is given a suspended sentence and no jail time.

After the trial, Cora's diner begins to boom, but her relationship with Frank worsens. While Cora is attending her mother's funeral, Frank has an affair with a wild cat tamer. Upon returning home, Cora tells him that she is pregnant. She is also angered when she finds out about his affair.

Frank and Cora eventually reconcile, get married and plan a happy future and a family. Then Cora is killed in a car crash while Frank is driving. The book ends with Frank, from death row, summarizing the events that followed, explaining that he was wrongly convicted of murdering Cora. The text, he hopes, will be published after his execution.

== Publication history ==
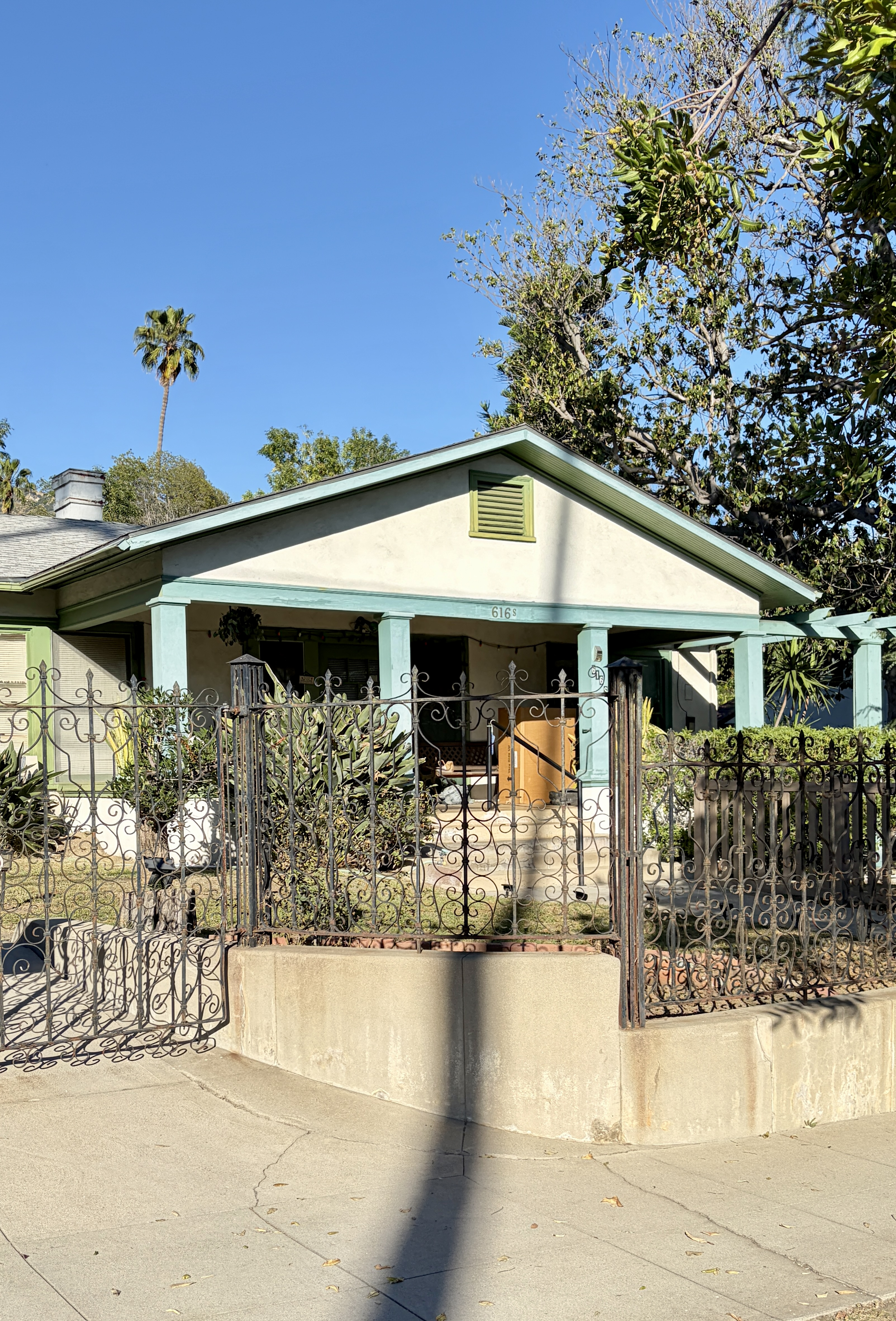
House in Burbank, California, where James M. Cain wrote The Postman Always Rings Twice.

After failing as a scriptwriter for Paramount and Columbia studios in 1932, Cain resumed his efforts to write a longer work of fiction. His short story "The Baby in the Icebox" had impressed Alfred A. Knopf publishers, and with their encouragement and that of playwright Vincent Lawrence, Cain began to write a novel in March 1933. Completed in September, the manuscript was initially turned down by both Knopf and Macmillan. Walter Lippmann, who Cain had served under as a journalist at the New York World, interceded on his behalf and convinced Alfred Knopf to acquire the story. Originally titled Bar-B-Que, the work appeared as The Postman Always Rings Twice in early 1934. Publisher Knopf detested both the originally proposed title Bar-B-Que, as well as The Postman Always Rings Twice. A compromise title "For Love or Money" was proposed by Knopf. Cain and Lawrence insisted that the metaphor of a mail carrier as the agent of fate was essential and prevailed in the title dispute. [See below: Origins of the title].

== Critical response ==
In 1934, the 42-year-old Cain was a successful journalist, known primarily for his satiric dialogues and sketches published in The American Mercury and as a human interest columnist for New York World, The American Magazine and The Baltimore Sun.

"By mid-1934, the whole country was talking about the book, which was well on its way to becoming one of the most phenomenal successes in publishing history. —Biographer Roy Hoopes in Cain (1982)

With the publication of The Postman Always Rings Twice, Cain was instantly hailed as the foremost American writer in the hard-boiled genre. An "ecstatic" review by Franklin P. Adams in the New York Herald served to alert critics to Cain's achievement. The novel elicited high praise from literary critics in the US and abroad, and proved to be a perennial best-seller: "When the book appeared it caused a sensation." Cain was appalled when his work was described as the "quintessence" of the "hard-boiled" genre and the author labeled the preeminent "tough-guy" writer. He emphatically rejected these characterizations of his writing.

The arresting first sentence of the novel begins "They threw me off the haytruck about noon..." and was widely remarked upon. The early passages of the novel have been cited in journals and studied in college writing courses since the novel appeared. Biographer David Madden notes that the opening passages showcase Cain's narrative skill: "The compression, the swift execution of the basic situation [in the first pages] are typical of the entire novel." Cain's virtues as a novelist have not been uniformly lauded. Biographer Paul Skenazy noted that the Postman suffered from "simplistic psychological portraits, some mannered writing [and] inconsistencies in the time frame and plot structures...". Critic Walter Wells in his analysis of Hollywood fiction argued that the "Postman remains a forced, structurally imperfect work [pandering] shamelessly to subliterary taste."

"Well, there's all sorts of stuff written about what kind of novel it is—it seems to baffle these critics as they keep trying to label it. But to me it's a love story and that's all it is." – Literary critic and satirist Dorothy Parker on The Postman Always Rings Twice.

Literary critic Edmund Wilson cautioned that the story is "always in danger of becoming unintentionally funny." Biographer Roy Hoopes noted that "After reading...Cain's light fiction, you cannot help but wonder whether the comic scenes in Postman were really unintentional." The fame of The Postman Always Rings Twice prompted parodies: humorist James Thurber, who had worked with Cain at The New Yorker in the early 1930s, offered a burlesque of the first sentence of the novel which opens: "They kicked me out of college when I was about twenty-seven..."

Hoopes regards The Postman Always Rings Twice as "that rarest of literary achievements—a best-seller widely acclaimed by the critics."

== Plot and theme origins ==
Two sources informed Cain's plot inventions for The Postman Always Rings Twice. In California during the early 1930s, he frequented a gas station operated by a buxom woman who pumped his gas. Cain described his encounters with her:

Commonplace, but sexy, the kind you have ideas about. We always talked when she filled up my tank. One day I read in the paper where a woman who runs a filling station knocked off her husband. Can it be this bosomy thing? I inquire. Yes, she's the one—this appetizing but utterly commonplace woman.

Cain discovered the dramatic component he required for the story in the details of the 1927 Ruth Snyder-Judd Gray case, in which a wife murdered her husband in collusion with her lover, the prototypes for his characters Cora Papadakis and Frank Chambers in Postman. Biographer Paul Skenazy suggests that Cain was intrigued not only by their adultery and murder, but the subsequent betrayals that sent Snyder and Gray into "a self-destructive spiral."

=== Origins of title ===
The meaning of the title has been the subject of much speculation. William Marling, for instance, suggested that Cain may have taken the title from the sensational 1927 case of Ruth Snyder, who, like Cora in Postman, had conspired with her lover to murder her husband. Cain used the Snyder case as an inspiration for his 1943 novel Double Indemnity; Marling believed it was also a model for the plot and the title of Postman. In the real-life case, Snyder said she had prevented her husband from discovering the changes she had made to his life insurance policy by telling the postman to deliver the policy's payment notices only to her and instructing him to ring the doorbell twice as a signal indicating he had such a delivery for her.

The historian Judith Flanders, however, has interpreted the title as a reference to postal customs in the Victorian era. When mail (post) was delivered, the postman knocked once to let the household know it was there: no reply was needed. When there was a telegram, however, which had to be handed over personally, he knocked twice so that the household would know to answer the door. Telegrams were expensive and usually the bringers of bad news: so a postman knocking (later, ringing) twice signaled trouble was on the way.

In the preface to Double Indemnity, Cain wrote that the title of The Postman Always Rings Twice came from a discussion he had with the screenwriter Vincent Lawrence. According to Cain, Lawrence spoke of the anxiety he felt when waiting for the postman to bring him news on a submitted manuscript, noting that he would know when the postman had finally arrived because he always rang twice. In his biography of Cain, Roy Hoopes recounted the conversation between Cain and Lawrence, noting that Lawrence did not say merely that the postman always rang twice but also that he was sometimes so anxious waiting for the postman that he would go into his backyard to avoid hearing his ring. The tactic inevitably failed, Lawrence continued, because if the postman's first ring was not noticed, his second one, even from the backyard, would be.

As a result of the conversation, Cain decided upon that phrase as a title for his novel. Upon discussing it further, the two men agreed such a phrase was metaphorically suited to Frank's situation at the end of the novel. With the "postman" being God or fate, the "delivery" meant for Frank was his own death as just retribution for murdering Nick. Frank had missed the first "ring" when he initially got away with that killing. However, the postman rang again and this time the ring was heard; Frank is wrongly convicted of having murdered Cora and then sentenced to die. (Note: This is the explanation offered in the 1946 film adaptation of the novel.) The theme of an inescapable fate is further underscored by the Greek's escape from death in the lovers' first murder attempt, only to be done in by their second one.

== Adaptations ==
The Postman Always Rings Twice has been adapted many times, as a film (seven times), as an opera, as a radio drama, and as a play (twice).

- Le Dernier Tournant (The Last Turn In The Road), a 1939 French film directed by Pierre Chenal and starring Michel Simon as Nick
- Ossessione (Obsession), a 1943 Italian film directed by Luchino Visconti and starring Clara Calamai and Massimo Girotti
- The Postman Always Rings Twice (1946), an American film starring Lana Turner and John Garfield, probably the best known of the film adaptations
- Story of a Love Affair (Italian: Cronaca di un amore), the 1950 debut feature film of Michelangelo Antonioni was partly inspired by The Postman Always Rings Twice
- Porto das Caixas (Port of Boxes), a 1962 Brazilian film directed by Paulo César Saraceni starring Irma Alvarez. Free, unaccredited version.
- Chair de Poule (Goosebumps), a 1963 French film directed by Julien Duvivier, based on the 1960 novel Come Easy—Go Easy by James Hadley Chase, the key plot elements of which were drawn without acknowledgement from The Postman Always Rings Twice
- The Postman Always Rings Twice (1981), an American film from a screenplay by David Mamet, directed by Bob Rafelson, and featuring Jack Nicholson and Jessica Lange
- The Postman Always Rings Twice, a 1982 opera with a libretto adapted from the novel by Colin Graham and music by Stephen Paulus
- Sarı Bela, a 1985 Turkish film.
- The Postman Always Rings Twice, adapted as a BBC radio drama in 1993 by Shaun McKenna and in 2013 by Charlotte Greig
- The Postman Always Rings Twice, a play adapted by Andrew Rattenbury, directed by Lucy Bailey and starring Val Kilmer
- Szenvedély ("Passion"), a 1998 Hungarian film adaptation directed by György Féher and co-written by Béla Tarr
- Buai laju-laju ("Swing High, My Darling"), a 2004 Malaysian film adaptation by U-Wei Haji Saari
- Jerichow, a 2008 German film adaptation, set in a small town in the Eastern state of Saxony-Anhalt
- Почтальон всегда звонит дважды (пьеса) (The Postman Always Rings Twice), a 2008 play written and directed by Alexandre Marine and starring Kirill Safonov in its initial run, subsequently replaced by Daniil Strahov, at the Master Theatre in Moscow
- In an episode of Sesame Street, a short story titled "The Postman Always Rings Twice" is featured in a segment. But unlike the original novel, the plot takes the title more literally. In it, Grover desperately hopes for the postman to come, but instead other service people arrive ringing at different numbers.
- The title of the novel is referenced in season 14 episode 6 of It's Always Sunny in Philadelphia, "The Janitor Always Mops Twice".

== Sources ==
- Hicks, Jack; Houston, James D.; Hong Kingston, Maxine; Young, Al (2000). The Literature of California: Native American beginnings to 1945. University of California Press. p. 453. ISBN 978-0520215245
- Hoopes, Roy. 1981. The Baby in the Icebox and Other Short Fiction by James M. Cain. Holt, Rinehart & Winston. New York. ISBN 0-03058501-5
- Hoopes, Roy. 1982. Cain. Holt, Rinehart and Winston. New York. ISBN 0-03-049331-5
- Hoopes, Roy. 1986. Career in C Major and Other Fiction. McGraw-Hill Book Company. New York. ISBN 0-07-009593-0
- Madden, David. 1970. James M. Cain. Twayne Publishers, Inc. LCCN 78-120011.
- Skenazy, Paul. 1989. James M. Cain. Continuum Publishing Company. New York. ISBN 0-8044-2821-2
