= Brave and Cruel =

1948 short story collection by Denton Welch

- First edition cover
- Author: Denton Welch
- Cover artist: Denton Welch
- Language: English
- Genre: Short story collection
- Publisher: Hamish Hamilton
- Publication date: 1948
- Publication place: United Kingdom
- Media type: Print (Hardback)
- Pages: 248

Brave and Cruel and Other Stories is a collection of short stories by the English author Denton Welch first published in 1948. It followed his first two novels and was the last volume of his work he saw through to publication.

Publishers Hamish Hamilton released it in January 1949, despite the 1948 publication date, a few days after Welch's death. The volume comprises ten stories of varying length, the longest by far being the title story, the longest Welch wrote, which accounts for a third of the collection's length.

== Background ==
In 1944, Hamish Hamilton suggested publishing a selection of Welch's stories, both new and previously published. republished in magazines and journals, but Welch did not yet have sufficient material. Welch proposed a collection of nine stories to Routledge, his contracted publisher, in 1947 without success. Welch turned to Hamish Hamilton, but Jamie Hamilton instead expressed interest in Welch's next novel. Welch demurred, feeling that his health and other commitments made it unlikely he could complete the work on a schedule the publisher would accept. Welch countered with an offer of six previously published stories, three more completed and as yet unpublished, and one he was writing.

Welch proposed the short story "Brave and Cruel", completed but unpublished, give the volume its title. It concerns a wayward, charismatic character called Micki Beaumont and his relationship with the daughter of one of a group of friends. It appears to be leading to an ill-advised marriage. Hamilton knew that Welch's fiction was largely autobiographical and believed correctly that the story was based on a recent event, as Welch's journal for August and September 1943 demonstrates. (Note: Jocelyn Brooke omitted the entries from the 1952 edition of the Journals, but they appear in Michael De-la-Noy's 1984 edition.) After Welch agreed to make a few minor changes to the text, Hamilton was satisfied the story was not actionable.

Of the other stories, in autobiographical terms, "The Coffin on the Hill", "Narcissus Bay" and "At Sea" recall Welch's childhood in China, "The Barn" is set in his school holidays in England (part of this story appears in his unfinished autobiography I Can Remember), "When I Was Thirteen" and "The Trout Stream" would appear to be roughly contemporaneous in setting, "The Judas Tree" is set in his art school years, and "Leaves from a Young Person's Notebook" is set in the first half of 1939. "The Fire in the Wood" is (narratively) entirely fictional, written in the third person, and is the only story which features a female, called "Mary", as the principal character. Even here, however, the story appears rooted to some degree in an actual experience: "Jim", the woodman with whom Mary has a brief relationship, appears in the journals as Tom. In 1941 Welch had stated in a letter to his friend Marcus Oliver, "I've been having a romantic affair with a woodman."

== Contents ==
- The Coffin on the Hill
- The Barn (first published in New Writing and Daylight, Winter 1943/44)
- Narcissus Bay (first published in The Cornhill Magazine, July 1945)
- At Sea (first published in English Story, Fifth Series, ed. Woodrow Wyatt 1944)
- When I Was Thirteen (first published in Horizon, April 1944)
- The Judas Tree (first published in Penguin New Writing 26, ed. John Lehmann 1945)
- The Trout Stream (first published in The Cornhill Magazine, Spring 1948)
- Leaves from a Young Person's Notebook
- Brave and Cruel
- The Fire in the Wood

== Critical response ==
Edith Sitwell considered the story "Brave and Cruel" to be "extraordinary". Writing in The Guardian, Harold Brighouse stated that, taken as a whole, "[t]hese stories impress not by profundity but by precision". Anthony Powell, writing in The Times Literary Supplement, found Micki's fantasies "well indicated; but one feels that more 'bite' is required in the telling". He concluded: "if Mr Welch can remain severely objective, he has a talent to be developed.

In a review in The Spectator two weeks later, Olivia Manning struck a similar note:

One is saddened... to note in the development of his work from its early self-absorption to an understanding of and sympathy with odd and difficult characters like the hero of the title story—new powers and a promise that cannot now be fulfilled.

In his 1974 analysis, Robert Phillips wrote that the collection included some "of Welch's most remarkable achievements" and that it "deserves to be reprinted and made available again".
