= Dumb Instrument =

- First edition cover
- Author: Denton Welch (Jean-Louis Chevalier, editor)
- Illustrator: Denton Welch
- Cover artist: Denton Welch
- Language: English
- Genre: Poetry
- Publisher: Enitharmon Press
- Publication date: 1976
- Publication place: United Kingdom
- Media type: Print (Hardback and Paperback)
- Pages: 58

Dumb Instrument is the title given to the posthumous 1976 anthology of poetry by the English writer and artist Denton Welch. It derives from the fifth line of a sestet which appears on the title page of the anthology only.

Compiled by Jean-Louis Chevalier from Welch's papers held at the Harry Ransom Center at the University of Texas at Austin, and published by the Enitharmon Press, the anthology contains 58 poems, none of which had appeared in print before. As such, it is the last wholly new volume of Welch's writing to be issued to date.

== Background ==
Welch had written poetry since childhood, but had an abiding sense of doubt as to his skill. In September 1938 he mentioned to his friend Maurice Cranston that he had some which he would like to get typed; according to Cranston this was the first inkling he ever had that Welch regarded himself as a poet. Nonetheless, his first ever published work was a poem, and during his lifetime nineteen appeared in various journals and magazines.

Despite this modest success, he noted in his journal, "I keep on wondering if I'm producing semi-demi A. E. Housman. I should hate this, although he is a lovely poet." He also wrote to the poet Henry Treece in 1943 that he felt that something was 'wrong' with his poetry but could not identify what. He confessed to Treece that:

I just want to do it; and consequently what comes out of me will probably be rather shapeless, rather sexy and probably rather trite.

His concerns were echoed by both Cranston (who stated that Welch "was not the poet he wished to be",) and Jocelyn Brooke, who edited the first edition of The Denton Welch Journals in 1952.

After Welch's death, two further poems appeared in an edition of Penguin New Writing in 1950, and sixty-seven were included in A Last Sheaf (1951). This collection included all but six of Welch's previously published poems. Welch also included poems in his journals, and these were reproduced in the Brooke edition of the Journals.

It was not until the early 1970s that Jean-Louis Chevalier uncovered almost a thousand short poems in the Ransom archive, the majority of which were contained in seven dated notebooks (dating from 1940 to 1948), and he set about having some of them published. One poem, "The Needled Worm" - unusually for Welch in blank verse - appeared in Words Broadsheet No. 11, published privately in 1975 as part of a sequence of seven Welch issues.

== Content ==
Dumb Instrument appeared the year after the Words series, containing fifty-nine further short poems. According to Chevalier, many of the poems "are concerned with mortality: Welch was a condemned man and he knew it from his early twenties."

Chevalier's stated criteria for selecting the poems include: clearly completed works rather than unfinished, those not "privately personal" and those which are not in some way a repetition of another. Chevalier does point out, as others have done, that Welch's "virtuosity", so evident in prose, sometimes appears "unsteadily so" His ability to structure a piece, never a strength in his prose, is all the more exposed here, and his deployment of striking imagery is sometimes hobbled by cliché:

Dark heron pass
Across the sky
And never think
Or reason why

Generally, Welch does not use titles, and Chevalier admits to being unclear as to whether some apparent titles, sometimes inserted at the end of a poem, are indeed titles, epigraphs or even the beginning of an unfinished stanza.

As with his prose, Welch's poetry is highly solipsistic, with his disability often to the fore, matched by a strong sense of isolation.

O I lie here
On my bed in the dark
And out beyond
The lights are burning
Lights on the road
Across the fields
Speeding on and never returning

Another feature of Welch's poems, almost absent from his prose, is a sense of the ongoing war. It features either implicitly, and often contrasted to his own personal circumstances, as in "Evil lives in men's hearts" or as a backdrop to his experiences in the Kent countryside, in "Mushroom heart":

I was all alone
In the fields
By the concrete pill-box
House where no fighting
Was ever done

One of the longest, and perhaps one of the most ambitious poems in the collection is "The Fear and the Monkey", dated Monday 24 February 1947, just under two years before his death. In the long (for Welch) 23-stanza poem, he conceives of his spirit as a monkey-cum-pug dog, which he keeps as "a secret in my jacket". It co-exists happily with Welch's physical being, and revels in his active life ("He was my doll, my manikin"). When ill-health sets in, the creature turns on him, devouring him from the inside out, before abandoning him. ("He never paused, he never turned / Cold, cold now where his claws had burned") Welch's biographer, James Methuen-Campbell, quotes the poem in full, identifying the yawning chasm between Welch's physical and mental condition: his full, horrifying comprehension of the progressive deterioration of his body and what it would ultimately mean.

Chevalier identifies that this poem had two further suppressed stanzas, perhaps indicating that Welch harboured even bigger ambitions for it, already exceeding in length as it does any of his other surviving poetry. A final, incomplete stanza reads:

(And) I was left forever to watch the stones
To feel the turning of the bones
Under [...]
Oh all was wasted, all was gone.

Dumb Instrument is illustrated with a number of Welch's 'decorations' taken from his poetry notebooks, including the cover from the notebook dated 1943 (frontispiece) and an unidentified full-page illustration as a tailpiece bearing the legend 'The End' surrounded by familiar, if bleakly rendered, Welch motifs (shells, shrouded figures, mythical beasts).

660 copies of the book were published in 1976, the first 60 being specially bound and numbered. Unusually for such a limited print run, some of the copies were clothbound and some were issued in card covers.

== Critical response ==
The low print run, and the scarcity in print of Welch's other work at the time meant that reviews were similarly few in number. In The Times Literary Supplement, George Sutherland Fraser identified two features missing from Welch's poetry generally: any sense of "impersonal structure", and the effects of Welch's apparent reticence to ask for others' opinions. But as a consequence of these very absences, Fraser found "a quite unusual intimacy with his own joy and pain."

Writing in Études Anglaises, Sylvère Monod shared Chevalier's view that much of Welch's poetic skill lay not here but in his prose. Nonetheless, within the poems he found "incisive beauty" and "blissful expressions that provide the reader with refined joys."

In his review Fraser hoped the collection would see a re-publication of Welch's prose, but it would be almost a decade before most of his output was before the book-buying public again.
