= Harry Burnett =

American puppeteer and mask creator

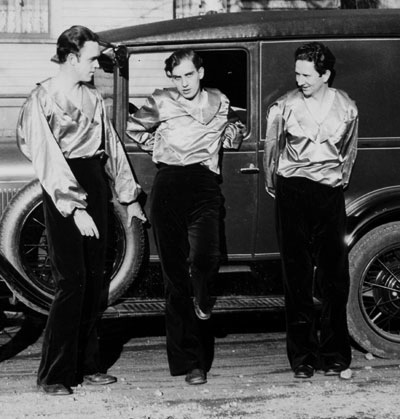
Forman Brown, Harry Burnett and Roddy Brandon

Harry Burnett (January 6, 1901 – May 28, 1993) was the designer of the Yale Puppeteers. He was also a mask creator. In Better Angel, Forman Brown's early gay novel, he is Derry.

== Biography ==
Harry Burnett was born on January 6, 1901, the son of Noble Burnett, a dry goods store owner, and Rose Clark. Advertising executive Leo Burnett was his brother and his nephew is Dan Bessie, who, in the film Turnabout: the Story of the Yale Puppeteers documented the history of the Yale Puppeteers.

In 1923 Harry Burnett, his cousin Forman Brown, and his latter partner, Richard Brandon, formed a group of puppeteers while attending University of Michigan. Forman Brown was the writer and Harry Burnett the designer. The group continued when they moved to Yale University and became the Yale Puppeteers.

An early work included a production of Bluebeard designed by Norman Bel Geddes.

In the 1930s the company performed in their own puppet theatre in East 40th Street in Manhattan. In 1933 they did a puppet sequence in the movie I Am Suzanne. In 1936–1938 they performed at the Barbizon-Plaza Hotel and the Cosmopolitan Club.

In the 1940s they moved to California and, on July 10, 1941, they opened Turnabout Theatre, a permanent theatre in Los Angeles, where they performed until 1960. Elsa Lanchester regularly performed at the Turnabout Theatre singing Forman Brown's adult themed songs.

== Legacy ==
In 1933, Forman Brown wrote Better Angel, under the pseudonym Richard Meeker, about a young man coming to terms with his homosexuality. The novel is regarded as "the first American novel to present the 'gay' experience in a healthy light." When it was reprinted in 1995, thinking that the author was no longer alive, Brown stepped forward and acknowledged the novel was heavily autobiographic: that the main character, Kurt, was indeed Forman Brown; That one of the main character's love interests, Derry, was Brown's cousin, Harry Burnett; that Kurt's main love interest, David, was Richard Brandon; and that another of Kurt's lovers, Tony, was actor Alexander Kirkland.

In 1936 Forman Brown published Punch’s Progress, the story of the Yale Puppeteers.
