= I Left My Grandfather's House =

1958 novel by Denton Welch

- First edition cover
- Author: Denton Welch
- Illustrator: Leslie Jones
- Cover artist: Denton Welch (Note: The first edition has two cover variants: An edition with black and white illustrations features a watercolour of a lane with trees and a cottage. (The cover of the 2006 reprint uses a similar theme but with a different illustration.) The cover of the colour edition is taken from a pen-and-ink drawing of c.1940 featuring a cow in the park of Oxon Hoath with the manor house in the background. This is in the Royal Academy Collection, part of a bequest by Carel Weight in 1999.)
- Language: English
- Genre: Autobiographical novel
- Publisher: Lion and Unicorn Press at the Royal College of Art
- Publication date: 1958
- Publication place: United Kingdom
- Media type: Print (Hardback)
- Pages: 82

I Left My Grandfather's House is an uncompleted autobiographical novel by the English author and painter Denton Welch. Welch provided no title for this work. The text was found in his journal, set apart from his usual entries at the end of one of the journal volumes, the heading "Book I". The title is taken from the first five words of the work's second sentence and used consistently since its first publication.

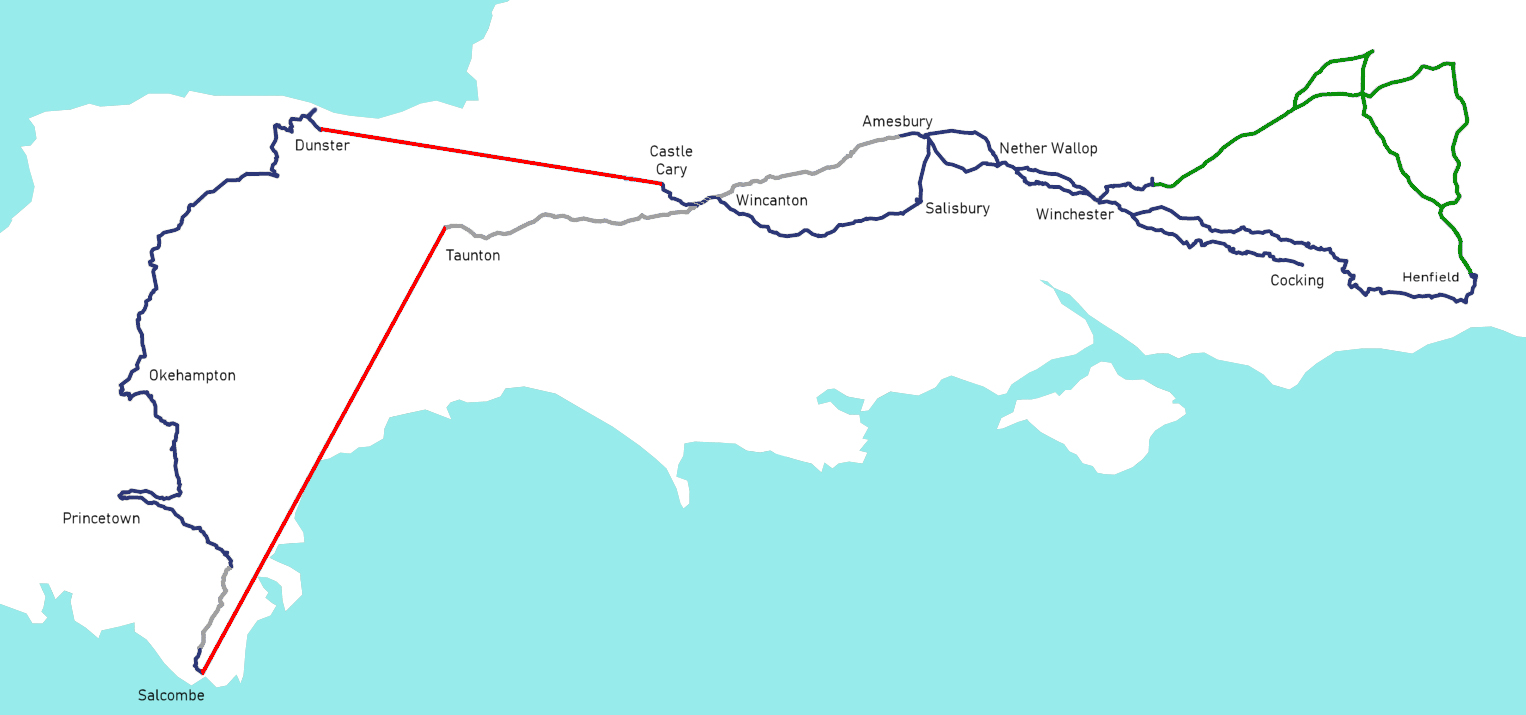
Map showing Denton Welch's travels as recounted in "I Left My Grandfather's House". Red line shows the unaccounted-for parts of the journey, grey represents journeys by car and green by train.

Written in March 1943 and left incomplete at the time of his death in 1948, it is an account of a walking tour Welch took in the summer of 1933, when he was eighteen. His travels took him from his grandfather's house in Henfield, West Sussex, through Hampshire, Wiltshire, Somerset and Devon; he then returned to Henfield. The text continues with an abbreviated account of a trek following the Pilgrims' Way, which ends at Cocking.

== Summary ==
Picaresque and episodic in nature, Denton's adventures include encounters with a tramp, a young man who attempts to con him out of money, various (sometimes rather inhospitable) youth hostel proprietors and members of his own extended family, as he seeks a place to sleep for the night. Parts of the journey are lost to him, as he remarks when recounting his arrival at Castle Cary, Somerset: "I can remember nothing until I emerged at the market place at Dunster", a gap of 50 miles. There is a similar gap between Salcombe, Devon and Taunton, although in this instance he recalls an episode walking part of the way "with a boy from Bermondsey". Eventually running out of money, he gets some financial assistance from a youth hostel proprietor in Winchester to catch a train back to Henfield, where reminders of his unsatisfactory life there, in particular his difficult aunt, prompt him to undertake another hike, this time from Winchester to Canterbury.

Welch never returned to the account, which he had entered in his journal for March 1943. The narrative concludes as he is engaged in a watercolour painting of a view from Cocking churchyard. (Note: James Methuen-Campbell, in his 2002 biography, Denton Welch: Writer & Artist identifies an undated note on scrap paper which appears to be a rough outline of the remainder of the story, suggesting episodes at Four Marks, Godstone, Kemsing, Stansted, Trottiscliffe, Charing and Canterbury. Welch also made a passing reference to this unfinished section of the story in his final book, A Voice Through a Cloud. A further three-paragraph fragment, rejected from A Voice Through A Cloud but connected with the reminiscence on page 116 of that work, appears in the 2005 anthology, Where Nothing Sleeps under the title "A Free Ride". It describes an episode outlined in Welch's notes for what would have been the remainder of the story. Set in Canterbury, it presumably would have formed part of the concluding pages of the completed work.)

As with much of Welch's unfinished writing, some of the material in this novel had other incarnations. The short story "Full Circle", which he wrote in 1942, before he started on the text published as I Left My Grandfather's House, is an expanded account of Welch's first night on the road, when he slept rough in a barn in the company of the farmer's teenage son, although in that earlier tale it is fictionalised as a ghost story. The second half of Welch's short story "The Barn", written around the same time as I Left My Grandfather's House, revisits the same theme, presenting Welch as a nine-year-old and the teenager transformed into an older, but still youthful, tramp.

== Editions ==
I Left My Grandfather's House was first printed in 1958 by the Lion and Unicorn Press at the RCA after the Journals had been published in abridged form in 1952 without this text. (Note: Two limited editions, both productions of the RCA, were issued in 1958. An initial edition of 150 has black and white lithographs by Leslie Jones, and states 'Privately Printed' and 'for James Campbell', who was an antiquarian bookseller who had obtained the rights to publish the story. A further edition of 200 copies, a publication of the RCA, is similar but includes additional lithographs in colour. Both editions erroneously give Welch's birthdate as 1917, and state that he died aged 31.) Long unavailable thereafter, it was re-published in 1984 by Allison & Busby. Further editions were issued by Exact Change in 1999 (along with In Youth is Pleasure), the Tartarus Press (as part of a two-volume Welch anthology) in 2005 and the Enitharmon Press in 2006. (Note: The 1958 edition makes one change — reverted in all subsequent editions — from Welch's manuscript: on page 73, "Fucking filthy water" becomes "Mucking filthy water". The first modern appearance of the word 'fuck' in literature in the UK, and the celebrated trial which followed it, was still a year away.)

The 1958 edition includes an introduction by Welch's art-school friend Helen Roeder. Several letters Welch wrote to Roeder appear as an appendix, although these concern his first novel, Maiden Voyage, rather than this work. These did not feature in any of the subsequent editions.
