= Sinful Woman =

1947 novel by James M. Cain

- Cover of the first edition
- Author: James M. Cain
- Language: English
- Genre: Detective fiction
- Publisher: Avon
- Publication date: 1947
- Publication place: United States
- Media type: Print (paperback)
- ISBN: 0887390897

Sinful Woman is a detective novel by James M. Cain that appeared originally as a paperback in 1947 by Avon publishers. Sinful Woman was the most commercially successful of three paperbacks Cain wrote for Avon in the late 1940s and early 1950s (the other two are Jealous Woman (1950) and The Root of His Evil (1951)).

== Plot ==
The story is set in Nevada during the early 1940s. Hollywood screen star Sylvia Shoreham is in Reno, having just finalized her divorce with her now ex-husband cum manager. Shoreham remains resentful that her genuine talent had been squandered in demeaning screen roles. When her former spouse is suddenly found dead, Shoreham comes under suspicion. County Sheriff Parker Lewis is assigned to investigate, but discovers that the suspect is the same movie actress he has idolized for years, based on her early screen portrayal of a noble and self-sacrificing young woman. Lucas wishes to serve as Shoreham's champion and mentor, despite her apparent moral lapses. Shoreham suspects that her sister, Hazel, is the murderer, but she attempts to shoulder the blame to shield her sibling. The situation is complicated when Hollywood executives make a clumsy attempt to shelter their movie star Shoreham from the tabloids by framing the death as a suicide.

The high-minded Lucas and the noble Shoreham discover that they are in love. The mystery is solved when an eyewitness to the accidental death testifies in court. The story ends happily, and the couple helps to raise funds for a tubercular hospital in Reno.

== Publication background ==
The story was originally based on Cain's 1938 play 7-11. Cain derived a serial from the play's scenario entitled “Galloping Dominos” which was never published. The serial was reworked to form a novel, and Avon released it under the title Sinful Woman in 1947. Cain's decision to create original novels for paperback editions alarmed his long-time hardback publisher Alfred A. Knopf, according to biographer Roy Hoopes:

Cain’s contract with Avon “upset [publisher] Alfred A. Knopf, who thought it was bad business to have original paperbacks of Cain’s while he was publishing him in hard-cover. Cain did not mean to fast-deal Knopf, but after the publishers had turned down 7-11 in its original form a couple of years earlier, Cain had assumed he would not be interested in it again, after he wrote it as The Galloping Domino.”

Avon publishers provided Cain with a $500 advance for the story, the first of three paperback novellas that he wrote for them.

== Critical assessment ==
Cain's most successful novels were written from the first-person confessional point-of-view. In Sinful Woman, he employs an omniscience third-person narrator, but with less success than his 1941 novel Mildred Pierce. Literary critic Paul Skenazy writes:

Working in the third-person, Cain badly overwrites, producing a pretentious prose completely at odds with the story. He gives way to conventional romanticism, makes artistic and mythic allusions to heighten the effect, and idealizes his subjects...

Skenazy adds: “The language [in Sinful Woman] is a weird combination, [both] euphemistic and crude, and the sexuality is at once smutty and dull.” Biographer and novelist David Madden reports that Cain “has never written for the pulps, but observes:

Only in Sinful Woman does Cain seem to be writing down to the sort of audience that sustained the massive body of formula [pulp] writing...If there is a case to be made against Cain as a cheap writer [Sinful Woman and Jealous Woman (1950)] are chief exhibits.

Cain himself did not consider Sinful Woman, nor his other works written for paperback as commendable works, and rarely acknowledged as part of his oeuvre.

== Sources ==
- Hoopes, Roy. 1982. Cain. Holt, Rinehart and Winston. New York. ISBN 0-03-049331-5
- Madden, David. 1970. James M. Cain. Twayne Publishers, Inc. Library Catalog Card Number: 78-120011.
- Skenazy, Paul. 1989. James M. Cain. Continuum Publishing Company. New York. ISBN 0-8044-2821-2
