= Lost Gay Novels =

2003 non-fiction book about gay literature

- Cover of the book.
- Author: Anthony Slide
- Language: English
- Publisher: Psychology Press
- Publication date: 2003
- Pages: 204
- ISBN: 978-1-56-023414-2

Lost Gay Novels is a 2003 reference guide written by Anthony Slide that provides commentary on 50 works of gay literature published between 1900 and 1950 that Slide found to be not well known by late 20th and early 21st-century audiences.

== Summary ==
Lost Gay Novels provides plot summaries and reviews of 50 novels, organized alphabetically by the authors' last names. The book does not comprehensively cover gay literature from the time period, nor was it designed to be a recommended reading list, but rather covers books with different outlooks on homosexuality and gay issues and the context of their times. Most of the novels included are American, though a few are from Europe. The book also provides a discussion on the characters, and presents authors who are not normally associated with homosexuality.

== Covered works ==
- "James Barr" (James Fugaté), Quatrefoil: A Modern Novel
- Larry Barretto, The Great Light
- "Stuart Benton" (George Sylvester Viereck), All Things Human
- Alvah Bessie, Dwell in the Wilderness
- André Birabeau, Revelation
- "Isabel Bolton" (Mary Britton Miller), The Christmas Tree
- Vance Bourjaily, The End of My Life
- Kay Boyle, Gentlemen, I Address You Privately
- Myron Brinig, The Man Is My Brother
- "Richard Brooks" (Reuben Sax), The Brick Foxhole
- John Buchan, Greenmantle
- John Horne Burns, The Gallery
- James M. Cain, Serenade
- Clarkson Crane, The Western Shore
- Hubert Creekmore, The Welcome
- George Davis, The Opening of a Door
- Michael Jean De Forrest, The Gay Year
- Harrison Dowd, The Night Air
- Georges Eekhoud, A Strange Love: A Novel of Abnormal Passion (originally published as Escal-Vigor)
- Stuart Engstrand, The Sling and the Arrow
- John Evans, Shadows Flying
- Waldo Frank, The Dark Mother
- Ernest Frost, The Dark Peninsula
- Henry Blake Fuller, Bertram Cope's Year
- "Richard Hull" (Richard Henry Sampson), The Murder of My Aunt
- Charles R. Jackson, The Fall of Valor
- Nial Kent, The Divided Path
- Lew Levenson, Butterfly Man
- Jean Lyttle, Sheila Lacey
- Harlan Cozad McIntosh, This Fine Shadow
- Compton Mackenzie, Vestal Fire
- William Keepers Maxwell Jr., The Folded Leaf
- "Richard Meeker" (Forman Brown), Better Angel
- Ernest Milton, To Kiss the Crocodile
- Willard Motley, Knock on Any Door
- Blair Niles, Strange Brother
- Eugene O'Brien, He Swung and He Missed
- Elliot Paul, Concert Pitch
- Thomas Hal Phillips, The Bitterweed Path
- "Mary Renault" (Eileen Mary Challans), Promise of Love
- Janet Schane, The Dazzling Crystal
- Rex Stout, Forest Fire
- Leonard Alfred George Strong, The Last Enemy: A Study of Youth
- André Tellier, Twilight Men
- "Ward Thomas" (Edward Thomas McNamara), Stranger in the Land
- "Loren Wahl" (Lawrence J. Madalena), The Invisible Glass
- Sylvia Townsend Warner, Mr. Fortune's Maggot
- Denton Welch, Maiden Voyage
- Calder Willingham, End As a Man
- John Keith Winter, Other Man's Saucer

== Impact ==
Lost Gay Novels is notable for documenting the gay literature subculture that was active prior to the Stonewall riots. The novels discussed in the book have historically been both ignored by researchers and overshadowed by the history of gay pulp fiction and erotica. Slide mentions that in the 1940s and 1950s, gay literature was published and given publicity, likely due to gay editors leveraging their influence in the publishing world. Widespread realization that this "Homintern" was happening was partly the influence for homosexual panic.

This book inspired a collection that is now in the Cushing Library at Texas A&M University.

== See also ==
- List of gay novels prior to the Stonewall riots
- Freedom in This Village: Twenty-Five Years of Black Gay Men's Writing, 1979 to the Present (2005)
- The Lost Library: Gay Fiction Rediscovered (2010)
- Mighty Real: An Anthology of African American Same Gender Loving Writing (2011)
