= 7-11 (play) =

1937 short-lived Broadway play by James M. Cain

7-11 is a play by James M. Cain staged in August 1937 on Cape Cod produced by Richard Aldrich and directed by Alexander Dean.

The story involves a Hollywood movie director who is murdered in a 52nd Street restaurant similar to the 21 Club. Though the play was canceled shortly after opening, Cain later incorporated character and plot elements of the work into his 1947 novel Sinful Woman.

== Production history ==
The initial idea for the work was suggested by Broadway director and producer Jed Harris which revolves around the murder of a Hollywood director in a high-class restaurant in New York City. Producer Anton Bundsman expressed in the project and proposed to open the play after Cain promised to make revisions. The characters would include "a temperamental movie actress and her [screen]writer". Columnists reported that Lupe Vélez would likely come out of retirement to play the role of a prima donna screen star and Robert Benchley play her director.

As Cain's new novel Serenade was emerging as major success, he continued writing 7-11, sponsored by a new production company Almyno backed by Richard Aldrich and Peter Arno.

Production delays occurred when Vélez was unable to attend rehearsals in December 1937 and problems involving the development of the third act. Margot Grahame and Germain Aussey were considered as replacements for Vélez. The opening date was moved forward to late 1938.

The Richard Aldrich production was directed by Alexander Dean and had its premiere in Cohasset, Massachusetts on Cape Cod in August, playing in tandem with Sinclair Lewis' stage adaptation of It Can't Happen Here. The lead roles were performed by Nancy Carroll, Sheila Barrett and Barry Sullivan. The summer stock performance was scheduled for a week and was extended another week due to critical and popular interest.

Despite a number of rewrites, Jed Harris, though praising the dialogue, complained the plot was "confusing...the characters are not established. They're plunged into the midst of situations...the action piles on without breathing spells for the audience." Determined to have a major success on Broadway, Cain provided revisions, but 7-11 was never staged again. In 1943, Cain made a final attempt revive the work, but according to biographer Roy Hoopes "by the end of the year, that agony of the play was finally dead, once and for all..."

Cain's play survived in other literary forms: a serial titled “Galloping Dominos” (1943), set in Reno, Nevada rather than New York City, but which was never purchased by magazines or Hollywood; the unpublished “Galloping Dominos” was, in turn, reworked as a novel, originally titled The Galloping Domino, and appeared as Sinful Woman (1947).

== Sources ==
- Hoopes, Roy. 1982. Cain. Holt, Rinehart and Winston. New York. ISBN 0-03-049331-5
- Madden, David. 1970. James M. Cain. Twayne Publishers, Inc. Library Catalog Card Number: 78-120011.
- Skenazy, Paul. 1989. James M. Cain. Continuum Publishing Company. New York. ISBN 0-8044-2821-2
