= A Last Sheaf =

- First edition
- Author: Denton Welch
- Language: English
- Genre: Short story collection
- Publisher: John Lehmann
- Publication date: 1951
- Publication place: United Kingdom
- Media type: Print (Hardback)

A Last Sheaf is the title given to the second posthumous publication of works by the writer and painter Denton Welch. Published in 1951 by John Lehmann, it followed A Voice Through a Cloud, issued by Lehmann the previous year.

The collection was assembled by Welch's partner, Eric Oliver, with assistance from Lehmann and Welch's friend, Francis Streeten. It consists of five stories appearing for the first time, four previously published stories and two stories published in full for the first time. Also included are sixty-seven short poems and nine monochrome reproductions of Welch's paintings, at least one of which ("The Coffin House") had previously accompanied the publication of a short story. Contained in the text are a number of Welch's "decorations", as he called them. The dustjacket states that it is "adapted" from a drawing by Welch, but the overall design is not his; nor are the endpaper illustrations.

== Contents ==
Part One

- Sickert at St. Peter's (first published in Horizon magazine, Vol. VI, No. 32, 1942)
- The Earth's Crust (first published in Contact magazine, Sept-Oct 1950, along with a reproduction of "The Coffin House")
- Memories of a Vanished Period
- A Fragment of a Life Story (first published in Horizon magazine, No. 117, 1949)
- A Party
- Evergreen Seaton-Leverett (first published in Orpheus II, John Lehmann 1949)
- A Picture in the Snow
- Ghosts
- The Hateful Word
- The Diamond Badge (first published in part as "The Visit" in Penguin New Writing 38, 1949)

Part Two

- A Novel Fragment (Chapter I first published alone in Life and Letters, Vol. 65, June 1950)

Part Three

- Poems (67 poems, of which 15 had previously been published in magazines and journals including Abinger Chronicle, Penguin New Writing, The Adelphi and The Spectator)

Part Four

- Nine Paintings by Denton Welch

== Critical response ==
Response to the collection was mainly positive, focusing heavily on the Sickert piece and considering the book to be a memorial to its author. Robert Phillips, writing over 20 years later, characterised the collection as "a mixed bag", although this seems to describe the mix of genres in the book rather than a qualitative assessment. Overall, however, Phillips reflects that A Last Sheaf did not enhance Welch's critical reputation in the way that the preceding publications did, and publication of the journals would subsequently do.

The only detailed analysis of the poems in A Last Sheaf also comes from Phillips. This also remains the only substantial analysis of Welch's poetry, and even here it is restricted to those in this selection. Phillips finds Welch's poems to be generally quite poor, ranking with his art (which he does not rate very highly either). He finds in some of them sub-Housman allusion, an excess of adverbs and adjectives, and sometimes ill-judged use of rhyme. Ironically, for Phillips, Welch's most "poetic" language is in fact to be found in his prose. Nonetheless, despite their inferior status, Phillips does find in them redeeming features: vivid gothick imagery, often shocking juxtapositions (as in "Jane Allen", Welch's most-reprinted poem) and a keener awareness of the war raging around him than in his prose.

Phillips' views on Welch's poems in the book have not been universally shared, however. Not long after they were published, the English composer Howard Ferguson set five of Welch's poems from A Last Sheaf for voice and piano. The work, entitled Discovery, was a favourite concert piece of Kathleen Ferrier, who went on to record it.

Thirteen of Welch's poems were included in the text of his Journals, published the year after A Last Sheaf. It would be almost twenty-five years before any more of his poetry appeared in print again, in the 1976 anthology, Dumb Instrument.
