= Robert Wever =

Robert Wever was an English poet and dramatist of the sixteenth century (floruit c. 1550) about whom little biographical information seems to have survived. His name is often given as Richard Wever or simply R. Wever. An Enterlude called lusty Juventus, an interlude, attributed to him, was published in 1565.

The poem In Youth is Pleasure (In a herber green asleep whereas I lay...), is a popular and remembered anthology piece, has been several times set to music, and supplied the writer and painter Denton Welch with the title of his second novel.
