= Mildred Pierce (disambiguation) =

Mildred Pierce is a 1941 novel by James M. Cain.

Mildred Pierce may also refer to:

- Mildred Pierce (film), 1945 adaptation of the novel, starring Joan Crawford
- Mildred Pierce (miniseries), 2011 adaptation of the novel, starring Kate Winslet
- "Mildred Pierce", a song by Sonic Youth on the album Goo
