= Cory Book Service =

First LGBT mailing list devoted to selling queer books to a gay audience

The Cory Book Service was the first independent business devoted exclusively to selling books to a gay audience. Started by Donald Webster Cory, born Edward Sagarin, the service consisted of an LGBT mailing list in 1950s America which sent subscribers queer book recommendations and sometimes deeply discounted offers direct from publishers. At the height of the list, it had around three thousand subscribers. David K Johnson, in his book Buying Gay, said that at the time it might have been the largest LGBT mailing list in the world. Though sometimes referred to as a book club, the service did not have any in-person meetings. Instead, Cory would select books and send the titles to readers to guide reading and learning about the gay community.

== History ==
Greenberg Press, a small New York-based press published queer books and other eclectic titles starting in the 1920s, including the first gay book with a happy ending, Better Angel in 1933. From 1948 to 1951, Greenberg published many different gay books but most influential and popular was The Homosexual in America in 1951 by Donald Webster Cory. After its publication, the book sold out in only ten days and started a flood of letters and requests to Greenberg about the book and queer literature in general. The book was incredibly influential, becoming "the Ur-text for the pre-Stonewall homophile movement." Greenberg's vice-president Brandt Aymar started collecting a list of all the customers who made personal orders for the book or who wrote in asking about queer titles, hoping to use it to further tap into the gay market. He called it the "H" list, most likely standing for homosexual. Cory also received significant amount of reader mail, giving Aymar the ideal to pool those contacts with the existing "H" list. Together they formed the Cory Book Service. According to Aymar, it was much more successful than expected. After inviting the mailing list to join the book club, they had expected two to three percent to subscribe but instead 40 percent joined.

The first issue was sent out in September 1952. Cory offered discounts, secured subscribers the opportunity to buy books before they were published, and even used the audience to bring older books back into print and create English translations of works in other languages. The subscription list grew primarily through word of mouth and connections with other queer groups at the time, including the Mattachine Society and ONE magazine, which the service also promoted and help grow. There were also significant numbers of subscribers from Latin America, where Cory had a strong following. For the first year, it offered a gay book a month to subscribers. The selection was a curated list, aiming to share not just gay-themed literature but that of high quality. Selections included: The Poems of Cavafy, Hemlock and After by Angus Wilson and Special Friendship by Roger Peyrefitte.

Given the institutionalized homophobia and obscenity laws at the time, operating the service and participating were not without risks. People could be fined for even having a queer book. Historian Víctor Macías-González said that around that time queer people would rent gay books instead of buying them for this reason. Those caught distributing books could incur even higher fines and possibly be imprisoned for up to five years. Despite the possible legal issues, they decided to run the service in public, even sharing their physical address in Manhattan. Cory hired a legal team to vet books before sharing them on the service, a possible reason that they managed to initially avoid censorship. After a year, the publisher, Greenberg, was sued by the federal government for "publishing and distributing pornography" despite the fact that there was no actual pornographic or even sexually graphic content. Indeed, "many people at the time deemed pornographic any gay story that ended happily." In 1953, a judge fined them $3,000 and forced them not to reissue their gay fiction titles. The service shut down, not because business was slow but because the success had brought the legal crackdown. Greenberg not only stopped publishing queer books, but other publishers scared of possible backlash stopped as well. The service ran out of gay-themed books to offer to its subscribers.

In 1954, Arthur Richmond, a book publisher, bought the mailing list from Cory but continued to run it in his name without public knowledge of the change in operations. In early 1956, Richmond died and letters to the service received a notice in return that simply said "DECEASED." People assumed it had actually been Cory who had died. By this time, the service had inspired the creation of two other book services serving the homosexual market: ONE Book Service in Los Angeles and the Village Theater Center in New York City.

Cory, still alive, wanted the original service to continue and after exploring options eventually sold the service again, this time to a straight, Jewish woman from Long Island named Elsie Carlton who was interested in activism. To run the mailing list, Carlton chose a pseudonym, Leslie Laird Winston, and renamed it the Winston Book Service. The first edition was published in March 1957. Just like the original service, each month they would "feature some new or special book in the field, at a special price." Carlton went on to run the re-booted service for ten years and grew the audience to five thousand subscribers.

In 1967, Carlton sold the service again, to a professor named Russell Hoffman, who added news articles and travel tips to the book suggestions. It ran for two more years before ceasing publication completely in 1969.

== Legacy ==
Cory went on to later reject the gay movement that he had once had a major contribution to starting. By 1973, he wrote in a sociology journal that he believed homosexuality arose from "faulty childhood development" and could be "cured." It's possible that the founder's later rejection of the movement explains why the Cory Book Service is not often cited as central to founding it. Despite that, it played an important role in growing other essential organizations and helped queer people find each other through books before a mainstream activist movement had fully emerged. Books have been cited of particular importance because "gay bookstores were among the first venues not specifically linked with sex in which gays and lesbians could meet." The Cory Book Service played a related role, allowing people to discover each other and their own sexuality in an even less public way.
