= David Madden bibliography =

The following is a list of published works by David Madden (born July 25, 1933), including his novels, short stories, and literary criticism. He also published several poems and works of nonfiction.

== Fiction ==
=== Novels ===
- The Beautiful Greed (1961)
- Hair of the Dog (serialized novel) (1967)
- Cassandra Singing (1969)
- Brothers in Confidence (1972)
- Bijou (1974)
- The Suicide's Wife (1978)
- Pleasure-Dome (1979)
- On the Big Wind (1980)
- Sharpshooter: A Novel of the Civil War (1996)
- Abducted by Circumstance (2010)
- London Bridge in Plague and Fire (2012)

=== Short story collections ===
- The Shadow Knows (1970)
- The New Orleans of Possibilities (1982)

=== Short stories ===
- “Imprisoned Light” (1952)
- “Gristle” (1956)
- “Hurry Up Please It's Time” (1959)
- “Bearers of the Dead” (1959)
- “My Name Is Not Antonio” (1960)
- “Adonis in the Underworld” (1961)
- “The Shadow Knows” (1963)
- “Something Mourns” (n.d.)
- “Cassandra Singing” (1964)
- “The Singer” (1966)
- “Thad Miller and Atlas” (1966)
- “Lone Riding” (1966)
- “Big Bob's Night Owl Show” (1966)
- “Mirage” (1967)
- “A Piece of the Sky” (1967)
- “Big Bob and the Hellhounds” (1967)
- “Children of a Cold Sun” (1967)
- “The Master's Thesis” (1967)
- “Cassandra Singing: A Rasping of Leather” (1967)
- “Lorashan: A Romantic Tale” (1968)
- “Love Makes Nothing Happen” (1968)
- “The Day the Flowers Came” (1968)
- “Nothing Dies but Something Mourns” (1968)
- “The Passenger” (1969)
- “Skin Deep” (1969)
- “A Voice in the Garden” (1969)
- “On Target” (1969)
- “No Trace” (1970)
- “Home Comfort” (1970)
- “A Human Interest Death” (1970)
- “Frank Brown's Brother” (1970)
- “The House of Pearl” (1970)
- “The Pale Horse of Fear” (1970)
- “Night Shift” (1971)
- “Seven Frozen Starlings” (1971)
- “A Secondary Character” (1972)
- “Lindbergh's Rival” (1973)
- “Here He Comes! There He Goes!” (1973)
- “Wanted: Ghost Writer” (1973)
- “The Phantom Circuit” (1975)
- “Second Look Presents: The Rape of an Indian Brave” (1975)
- “From God's Typewriter” (1975)
- “Wipes and Finales, or Machine Close-Outs” (1976)
- “In the Bag” (1977)
- “The Hero and the Witness” (1977)
- “On the Big Wind” (1978)
- “Putting an Act Together” (1980)
- “Code-A-Phone” (1983)
- “Three of Them” (1984)
- “Lights” (1984–85)
- “Willis Carr at Bleak House” (1985)
- “The Eyes of Another” (1985)
- “Rosanna” (1985)
- “Was Jesse James at Rising Fawn?” (1985)
- “A Fever of Dying” (1986)
- “Children of the Sun” (1988)
- “Gristle” 1988)
- “The Invisible Girl” (1989)
- “Crossing the Lost and Found River” (1989)
- “The Demon in My View” (1989)
- “Willis Carr, Sharpshooter” (1989)
- “The Burning of the Railroad Bridges on the Grand Trunk Line in the Great Valley of East Tennessee” (1989)
- “The Satirist's Daughter” (1989)
- “The Violent Meditations of Willis Carr, Sharpshooter (1848-1933)” (1990)
- “James Agee Never Lived in This House” (1990)
- “A Forgotten Nightmare” (1991)
- “The Last Bizarre Tale” (1991)
- “A Survivor of the Sinking of the Sultana” (1992)
- “The Invisible Girl” (1993)
- “The Retriever” (excerpt) (1993)
- “Fragments Found on the Field” (1994)
- “Hairtrigger Pencil Lines” (1994)
- “Retracing My Steps” (1994)
- “Over the Cliff” (1995)
- “A Walk with Thomas Jefferson at Poplar Forest” (1996)
- “The Retriever” (1996)
- “Cherokee Is Missing” (1996)
- “The Incendiary at the Forks of the River” (2003-4)
- “London Bridge Nocturnes: January, A Memoir” (2005)

== Nonfiction ==
=== Literary criticism ===
==== Authored ====
- The Poetic Image in 6 Genres (1969)
- Harlequin’s Stick, Charlie’s Cane: A Comparative Study of Commedia dell’arte and Silent Slapstick Comedy (1975)
- A Primer of the Novel (1980)
- Writers’ Revisions (1981)
- Revising Fiction: A Handbook for Writers (1988)
- Beyond the Battlefield (2000)
- Touching the Web of Southern Novelists (2006)
- The Tangled Web of the Civil War and Reconstruction (forthcoming in 2015)

==== Compiled/edited ====
- Rediscoveries (1971)
- American Dreams, American Nightmares (1972)
- Proletarian Writers of the Thirties (1979)
- Tough Guy Writers of the Thirties (1979)
- Rediscoveries II (1988)
