= Sagarin =

Sagarin is a surname. Notable people with the surname include:

- Edward Sagarin (1913–1986), American sociologist
- Jeff Sagarin, American sports statistician
