= B. L. Coombes =

English-born writer

Bert Lewis Coombes (9 January 1893 – 4 June 1974), originally Bertie Lewis Coombs Griffiths, was an English-born writer. Coombes moved to Resolven from England before World War I and spent most of his working life in the coal mines of the South Wales coalfield, which provided the subject matter for much of his writing.

== Early life ==
Coombes was born in Wolverhampton and brought up in Herefordshire. He was the only child of James Coombs Griffiths, at that time a grocer, and Harriet Thompson.

A few years after Bertie's birth, the Coombes family dropped the surname Griffiths and adopted his father's middle name, "Coombs", as a surname, spelling it "Cumbes" or "Coombes". They moved to Treharris in South Wales where his father took work at the Deep Navigation Colliery and Bertie attended elementary school. In 1905 or 1906 his parents took a tenancy of a small farm in Madley, Herefordshire and Bertie left school to work as a farm labourer. He later became a groom for a local doctor but his family always struggled to pay the farm rent and in 1910, he left home and moved to South Wales to become a miner.

== In the mines ==
Coombes settled in Resolven in the Vale of Neath and started work as a collier's helper in an anthracite mine. In 1913 he married Mary Rogers, the daughter of the secretary to the local lodge of the South Wales Miners' Federation. They had one daughter, Rose, born the following year, and a son, Peter, born ten years later. Their union was to last fifty-six years. He spent forty years working underground.

== Writing ==
Coombes realised that those outside the coal-mining industry had little idea of the activities of miners and the dangers they faced. Despite his limited education, Coombes felt the urge to inform the general public about the mining industry and mining communities. When in his forties, he started doing this, writing in the evenings after a day in the pit. At first his manuscripts were rejected by publishers but eventually he encountered John Lehmann, the publishing editor of New Writing. This literary magazine sought to break down social barriers and published works by working-class authors as well as by educated middle-class writers.

Lehmann published Coombes' short story, "The Flame", which gave a detailed description of the terrifying ordeal of a miner, lying prone in an eighteen-inch coal seam, when seeping methane is ignited by his carbide lamp while he is packing dynamite into a hole. The story was much acclaimed and brought invitations from other publishers. More short stories followed, mostly based on real-life events he had experienced.

There are three recent editions of Coombes' work:

- B.L. Coombes, These Poor Hands: The Autobiography of a Miner Working in South Wales (2002 [1939]), ISBN 978-0-7083-1563-7, University of Wales Press
- B.L. Coombes, with 75 Rhondda images by Isabel Alexander (illustrator of the 1945 edition), edited by Peter Wakelin, Miner’s Day (2021 [1945]), ISBN 978-1-913640-38-5, Parthian Press, in which Coombes recounts the everyday activities of a miner inside and outside the pit, the grievances, attitudes and camaraderie.
- B. Jones and C. Williams (ed) With Dust Still in his Throat: The Writing of B. L. Coombes, The Voice of a Working Miner (2014). University of Wales Press. ISBN 978-1-78316-149-2

=== Other notable works ===
- I Am A Miner (1939)
- The Life We Want (1944)
- Those Clouded Hills (Cobbett, 1944)

== Critical reception ==
In 1974, the Times Literary Supplement wrote that Coombes was "one of the few proletarian writers of the 1930s who were impressive as writers rather than proletarians." The Social History Bulletin wrote, "Covering the 1930s and 1940s, and thus encapsulating a way of life that has disappeared, Bert Coombes's concern for the reality of the miner's lot provides a record of great interest to the social historian."
