= Maiden Voyage (novel) =

Novel by Denton Welch

- First edition
- Author: Denton Welch
- Cover artist: Denton Welch
- Language: English
- Genre: Autobiographical novel
- Publisher: Routledge
- Publication date: 1943
- Publication place: United Kingdom
- Media type: Print (Hardback)
- Pages: 154

Maiden Voyage is an autobiographical novel by the English writer and artist Denton Welch, who became a writer after a serious accident which had long-term effects on his health. The novel describes a period during the 1930s: his last term at school, and the following weeks living in Shanghai, China, where his father had a business.

== Background ==
The novel was first published in 1943 by Routledge, and it was his first published book, previously having articles published in periodicals. Edith Sitwell, who had written to Welch that "you are a born writer", agreed to accept the book's dedication. At the publisher's suggestion, Welch, who had been an art student, made decorations for the book, included end-papers, a dedicatory page and decorated section numbers.

At the time in which the novel is set, the writer's father, Arthur Welch, was a director of Wattie & Co, rubber estate managers in Shanghai. His mother, from Massachusetts, USA, had died in 1927. Europeans such as his father lived in the Shanghai International Settlement. When talking with their servants, Pidgin English was spoken; it is often quoted in the novel.

The original manuscript, which consists of nine exercise books, was donated to the British Museum (now held by the British Library) by Sir Eric Miller in 1956. Some earlier draft chapters are held in the archives of the University of Exeter.

== Summary ==
The novel is split into three sections, each prefaced in the original text with one of Welch's illustrations. The first covers his escape from, and last term at Repton School. The second covers his journey to China and the third recounts his year spent there.

Instead of travelling from London to Repton, in Derbyshire, the narrator takes a train to Salisbury, which he had once visited with his mother. He goes on to Exeter, and walks to Budleigh Salterton; he visits family acquaintances, who are surprised to see him. Back in Salisbury after a few days, he has no money left, and returns to his relations in London.

He returns to school in Derbyshire. Throughout the novel, every feature of his life comes under his calm scrutiny. "Haltingly at first the conversation flowed all over the [dining] room; then it gathered volume.... I imagined that everyone was talking about me, and I expect they were.... "Getting used to school in those first days was strange. Everyone thought that I had run away for a different reason and so they all treated me differently."

His father, sorry that he had run away from school, suggests in a letter that he come to Shanghai with his elder brother Paul, who is joining the company. "I was so full of joy that I ran down the lane and over the fields until I was exhausted. I felt like a person full of power and skill. I was no longer a part of the dead old system. I could bear anything now till the end of term."

He describes his arrival in Shanghai: "The water was covered with boats. Junks with coloured sails and great eyes painted on their bows were stuck together with sampans and iron-plated steamers, like a pudding of small sago and large tapioca. The Bund glistened through the masts and funnels. The buildings reminded me of New York, which I had never seen. There were no sky-scrapers, only an uneven terrace of buildings looking huge and majestic in the sun."

The narrator is interested in antiques, and he accompanies a friend of his father, an antiques dealer who is going to Kai-feng Fu on business, stopping en route at Nankin. Travelling by train from Nankin to Kai-feng Fu, "I sat looking out of the window at the eternal hills and plains and cities of dried mud. Everything was the same, tawny, earth-brown. Even the city walls were of baked-gold mud which made them look imitation, like the scenery at a searchlight tattoo."

On the day of his departure for Europe, "... I hurried into the dining room.... I started to read, hoping to calm my excitement.... I looked up and saw Cook squinting at me through the service-hatch. I seemed so different to myself, that I was not surprised. People were justified in staring at me. I was going away."

== Critical response ==
Contemporary reaction was positive, the striking prose style in particular catching many reviewers' eyes. Writing in The Spectator, Janet Adam Smith identified in the writing an "almost painful intensity and immediacy", through which the young Denton "lives for us in these pages with an almost embarrassing vividness." In The Times Literary Supplement, Marjorie Tiltman found an "astonishing awareness" from "an intolerant and clever pen", revealing "the over-egotism of the sensitive, the self-centeredness of the lonely in spirit, and, almost in spite of himself, awakes the reader's compassion." In an observation arrestingly revealing of its era, Tiltman chooses to identify the act of "illegally demanding a half-ticket" for the Salisbury train in the opening lines of the book as an example of Denton's "mis-deeds".

Robert Phillips notes that for some time following publication, many, including some significant bibliographies, took Maiden Voyage to be a work of literal autobiography. However he notes that in selecting, arranging and embellishing details from his life, Welch causes them to "lose specifically personal meaning and begin to become universal human materials, elements of works of art".

Phillips identifies several themes in the work, all inter-related, which include his attitude towards women following the early death of his mother, and heightened elements of his growing sexual awareness (emphatically not "awakening"). These are manifested in a number of arresting, highly charged, sometimes violent and often misogynystic images: an encounter with a Phallaceae fungus (or stinkhorn mushroom) at school (p. 83), a violent nightmare involving a woman whose breast has been pierced by a hat-pin (pp. 113–14), a boxing lesson from a furniture-mover he has been spying on and during which he takes a beating (p. 226) and an episode where he dresses up in his friend Vesta's frock (including make-up) before heading out into the street, fully aware that he resembles a prostitute (p. 243).

Apart from Sitwell, the book was praised by E.M. Forster, Gerard Hopkins and Kenneth Clark, although Forster's initial response to Welch's writing was rather more measured. He later modified his view when he learned of Welch's physical challenges.

== See also ==
- Lost Gay Novels
