= The Western Shore =

1925 novel

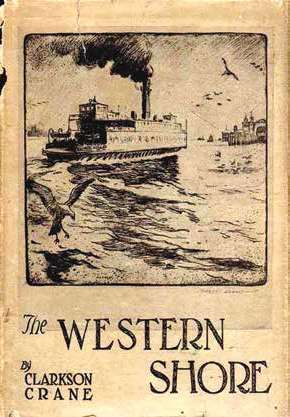
- Author: Clarkson Crane
- Publisher: Harcourt
- Publication date: 1925
- Publication place: United States
- OCLC: 1701530

The Western Shore is a 1925 novel written by Clarkson Crane. It depicts life at the University of California, Berkeley in a series of 20 "episodes" featuring a variety of characters. Lawrence Clark Powell described it as one of the first and best novels about university life at Berkeley.

The novel was not commercially successful and received mixed reviews. It is now mostly remembered for being an example of an early gay novel, for its inclusion of a gay professor as a major character as well as frank discussions of homosexuality among other characters.

== Background ==
Crane himself had studied at UC Berkeley, graduating in 1916. After graduation, he served in the army during World War I, and then pursued a career as a writer, publishing stories in a number of magazines. He traveled to Paris in 1924 where he lived on a small stipend from an aunt while composing The Western Shore, his first novel.

== Reception ==
The New York Times gave The Western Shore a tepid review, describing it as "realistic, brilliant and sound, without being great or important in any respect." A review in the Saturday Review of Literature complained that Crane "fails to realize the tragedy or the pathos" of his characters. Other critics, including Van Wyck Brooks, Paul Rosenfeld, and Carey McWilliams gave more positive assessments.

== As a gay novel ==
The Western Shore has been recognized as among the earliest novels to feature prominent gay themes. Most notably, the character of Philip Burton, a gay English professor. Other characters have been read as ambiguously gay, including the freshman student Milton Granger. Unlike many other gay novels of the early 20th century, it was printed by a mainstream publisher, and without use of a pseudonym. Contemporary reviewers did not remark on the novel's gay content, nor is it mentioned in the introduction to the 1985 second edition.

== See also ==
- Lost Gay Novels
