= Mildred Pierce =

1941 novel by James M. Cain

- Cover of the first edition
- Author: James M. Cain
- Language: English
- Genre: Hardboiled novel, psychological thriller
- Publisher: Alfred A. Knopf
- Publication date: 1941
- Publication place: United States
- Media type: Print (hardcover and paperback)
- OCLC: 2714770

Mildred Pierce is a psychological hardboiled novel by James M. Cain published by Alfred A. Knopf in 1941.

A story of "social inequity and opportunity in America" set during the Great Depression, Mildred Pierce follows the trajectory of a lower-middle class divorcée with two children in her tragic struggle to achieve financial and personal success. The novel is one of four major works Cain wrote featuring opera as a key component in the plot. (Serenade (1937), Career in C Major (1938) and The Moth (1948) are the others.)

Mildred Pierce is Cain's first effort to write a novel in the third-person narrative form, a departure from his earlier works of the 1930s, all of them confessional narratives written in the first-person.

== Plot ==
Set in Glendale, California, in the 1930s, the book is the story of a middle-class housewife, Mildred Pierce, and her attempts to maintain her family's social position during the Great Depression.

Mildred separates from Bert, her unemployed husband, and sets out to support herself and her children. After a difficult search, she finds a job as a waitress but worries that it is beneath her middle class station. More than that, she worries that her ambitious and increasingly pretentious elder daughter, Veda, will think her new job is demeaning. Mildred encounters success and failure as she opens three successful restaurants, operates a pie-selling business and copes with the death of her younger daughter, Ray. Veda enjoys Mildred's newfound success but increasingly turns ungrateful, demanding more and more from her hard-working mother while openly condemning her and anyone else who must work for a living.

When Mildred discovers Veda's plot to blackmail a wealthy family with a fake pregnancy, she kicks her out of their house. Veda, who has been training to become an opera singer, goes on to great fame, and Mildred's increasing obsession with her daughter leads her to use her former lover, Monty (a man who, like Mildred, lost his family's wealth at the start of the Depression), and his social connections to bring Veda back into her life. Unfortunately, this means buying Monty's family estate and using her earnings to pay for Veda's extravagances. Mildred and Monty marry, but things go sour as her lavish lifestyle and neglect of her businesses undermine the company's profits. Creditors line up, led by Wally, a former business associate of Bert's, with whom Mildred had a brief affair upon their separation. With no one to turn to, Mildred confesses to Bert that she has been embezzling money from her company to buy Veda's love.

Having decided that the only course of action is to ask Veda to contribute some of her considerable earnings to balance the books – and fearing that Wally might target her daughter's assets if they are exposed – Mildred goes to her room to confront her. There, she finds Veda in bed with Monty, her stepfather. Monty reproaches Mildred for using him to bring Veda back and for her attitude to him as a financial dependent of hers, while Veda affects boredom but joins in to chide Mildred for embarrassing her and taking glory in her success. Mildred snaps, brutally attacking and strangling Veda, who now appears incapable of singing and loses her contract.

Weeks pass as Mildred moves to Reno, Nevada, to establish residency in order to get a speedy divorce from Monty. Bert visits her. Mildred ultimately is forced to resign from her company, leaving it to Ida, a former assistant. Mildred and Bert, upon the finalization of her divorce, remarry. Veda travels to Reno and apparently reconciles with Mildred, but several months later, Veda reveals that her voice has healed and announces that she is moving to New York City with Monty. The "reconciliation" (which had been accompanied by reporters and photographers) was designed to defuse the negative publicity resulting from their affair, and it emerges the apparent loss of her voice was a ploy so that she could renege on her existing contract and be free to take up a more lucrative one offered by another company. As Veda leaves the house, a broken Mildred, encouraged by Bert, eventually says "to hell" with her monstrous daughter, and the pair agree to get "stinko" (drunk).

== Publication history ==
Cain's desire to write a novel about "a grass widow with two small children to support" had its origins in 1932 from a suggestion by fellow writer James McGuiness, and went through numerous plot and character permutations during the years of the Great Depression.

Mildred Pierce is the third of his four novels in which Cain incorporated Grand opera, for which he had trained as a baritone in his youth.

Mildred Pierce is a deliberate departure from Cain's earlier novels, yet it also culminates in his 1930s work. There is no killing, no crime, and no conflicts with the law in the story...the action is not concentrated into a narrow period of time, as in his earlier fiction, but stretches across the Depression...Cain was determined to create a broad social and temporal landscape through third-person reportage, as against the narrowly defined first-person focused on erotic obsessiveness..."

Kate Cummings, mother of Hollywood actress Constance Cummings, became a friend, a lover and a literary advisor to Cain during the writing of Mildred Pierce. Their relationship ended in 1943, in part due to Cain's drinking. Cummings provided Cain with insights essential to the development of his female protagonists in Mildred Pierce. Cain freely acknowledged that Cummings "saw me through" the writing of his "first serious novel."

By November 1941 Cain had completed two-thirds of the novel, but was struggling with adapting to writing in the third-person, his first effort in that narrative form. Cain wrote publisher Blanche Knopf in 1940:

I am telling it 'straight' in the third-person, and am having plenty of trouble with it...probably I am not really a novelist. If I can pretend it is somebody else's story, be sort of a secretary to the yarn, I do all right. When I try to step out on the stage myself, I get red behind the ears and boot it. Well, I shall finish it, wind, weather and tide permitting and we shall see.

The novel required four rewrites before Cain completed Mildred Pierce in the spring of 1941 and sold it to Alfred A. Knopf publishers on a $5,000 advance.

== Critical response ==
Mildred Pierce was released in September 1941 by Alfred A. Knopf publishers, Literary critic Edmund Wilson introduced the novel in an essay for The New Republic entitled "The Boys in the Back Room." Biographer Ray Hoopes observed that Wilson's measured praise "was the first suggestion by a major American critic that Cain had edged his way into the front ranks of American authors."

Cain's unsavory characterizations of Mildred and Veda were controversial, but the novel's plot lacked the sensational devices that many of his fans anticipated. Retail Bookseller predicted that "James Cain fans are likely to find Mildred Pierce decidedly mild and tame." Reviews of Mildred Pierce were mixed, but on the whole favorable. Never a best-seller, first editions had sold 11,000 hard-cover copies which quickly increased to 14,000 after several weeks. Hundreds of thousands of copies were sold in reprint by 1945.

== Theme ==
The theme of the novel derives from Cain's female protagonist, Mildred Pierce, a housewife who "uses men to gain her ends", in achieving financial success as a restaurateur. Mildred's daughter Veda, in turn, manipulates her mother to advance her musical ambitions. The elements of "food, finance and mothering" appear forcefully, as they did in earlier works, especially Cain's 1937 novel Serenade.

The social and economic hardships of the depression era are co-mingled with Cain's "obsessive concern with power within heterosexual relationships." Though never a "social" novelist in the tradition of Theodore Dreiser, Cain's descriptions of the working class experience are "bitter, incisive and unquestionably authentic." Critic Paul Skenazy writes:

For Cain, the most impressive elements of the Depression are not alterations in the job market, or class inequities, but the obsession with money that the economic crisis creates, and the way the economic collapse affects relations between the sexes. Because all of the men in the novel are out of work and financially dependent on women, the power structure of personal relations have been inverted.

Cain signaled his intention to treat the larger social landscape of the period when he chose to write Mildred Pierce in the third-person "as against the narrowly defined first-person focused on erotic obsessiveness..." This point-of-view allowed the author to more convincingly "convey a sense of a woman's perspective." Biographer David Madden observes:

Cain depicts ways in which certain aspects of the American character and the dream produce grotesque women like Veda...in the depression when everything is suddenly taken from her...Veda alone holds on desperately and arrogantly to all the dreams of affluence...she is the flowering of the seed of corruption in the American Dream...

== Adaptations ==
=== 1945 film adaptation ===
Cain was first approached about a film adaptation of Mildred Pierce by Warner Brothers producer Jerry Wald in 1943. Though Cain declined Wald's request to write a film treatment, Wald—known as a producer of films appealing to women moviegoers—continued to seek a suitable screenwriter. In the spring of 1944, Warners purchased the film rights for $15,000, When Cain received Wald's proposed treatments, the producer had inserted a murder into the story, and according to Cain, had failed to emphasize the dramatic implications "of having a big coloratura soprano in the family." When filmmaker Michael Curtiz was enlisted to direct Mildred Pierce, Cain urged him to avoid introducing hard-boiled themes and rather emphasize the novel's "wider implication... Mildred Pierce is one woman's struggle against a great social injustice—which is the mother's necessity to support her children even though husband and community give her not the slightest assistance." Literary critic Paul Skenazy notes the impact that Cain's novels had on 1940s film making in America:

In quick succession - in 1944, 1945 and 1946 - Hollywood produced successful movies from Cain's Double Indemnity, Mildred Pierce and The Postman Always Rings Twice. All three films helped break down the censorship barriers constructed by the Hays Office in the 1930s that prevented the portrayal of infidelity and sexual passion on the screen.

The film, starring Joan Crawford as Mildred, and Ann Blyth as Veda, was a box-office success. According to Warner Bros., it earned $3,483,000 in the U.S. and $2,155,000 in other markets.

=== TV miniseries ===
Director Todd Haynes filmed a five-part miniseries for television, with Kate Winslet as Mildred, Guy Pearce as Monty Beragon, and Evan Rachel Wood as Veda, in Spring 2010 (with Morgan Turner as the young Veda). Haynes wrote the script with Jon Raymond and served as an executive producer.

The miniseries aired on HBO, starting on March 27, 2011, and ending with a two-part finale on April 10, 2011. Unlike the movie version, it is almost a word-for-word dramatization of the novel, including nearly every scene and using Cain's dialogue. It features period music performed by Vince Giordano and the Nighthawks Orchestra.

=== Other adaptations ===
An hour-long radio play of the novel was first broadcast by the Lux Radio Theatre on the NBC Radio Network on 14 June 1954 starring Zachary Scott (also in the 1945 film) and Claire Trevor.

A 90-minute dramatization by John Fletcher for the Radio Noir series for Saturday Night Theatre on BBC Radio 4 was first broadcast on 26 June 1993. Shelley Thompson played the title role with Martin Jarvis as Monte Beragon and Ed Bishop as Bert Pierce.

== See also ==
- 1941 in literature

== Sources ==
- Als, Hilton..2011.This woman's work: James M. Cain on the grass widow. The New Yorker. (21 March 2011). Retrieved 12 May 2022 from: https://www.newyorker.com/magazine/2011/03/28/this-womans-work
- Byrne, Paul. 2011. Spoilt. The Herald. (20 June 2011) Retrieved 12 May 2022 from: https://www.independent.ie/regionals/herald/entertainment/tv-radio/spoilt-27982804.html
- Glancy, Mark H. 1995. Warner Bros Film Grosses, 1921–51: The William Schaefer Ledger. Historical Journal of Film, Radio and Television. 15: 26. doi:10.1080/01439689508604551.
- Hoopes, Roy. 1982. Cain. Holt, Rinehart and Winston. New York. ISBN 0-03-049331-5
- Madden, David. 1970. James M. Cain. Twayne Publishers, Inc. Library Catalog Card Number: 78-120011.
- Skenazy, Paul. 1989. James M. Cain. Continuum Publishing Company. New York. ISBN 0-8044-2821-2
