= Edward Sagarin =

American novelist

- Born: September 18, 1913; Schenectady, New York, United States
- Died: June 10, 1986 (aged 72); New York, U.S.
- Occupations: Professor; novelist; essayist
- Writing career
- Genres: Issues regarding homosexuality, sociology and criminology

Edward Sagarin (September 18, 1913 – June 10, 1986), also known by his pen name Donald Webster Cory, was an American professor of sociology and criminology at the City University of New York, and a writer. His book The Homosexual in America: A Subjective Approach, published in 1951, was considered "one of the most influential works in the history of the gay rights movement", and inspired compassion in others by highlighting the difficulties faced by homosexuals.

He was titled "father of the homophile movement" for asserting that gay men and lesbians deserved civil rights as members of a large, unrecognised minority. However, Vern L. Bullough believes the title is undeserved as Sagarin did not actively participate in resistance and did not join any homophile organisations until 1962, a time when he was seeking a topic to analyse in his thesis.

== Biography ==
=== Early life ===
Sagarin was born in Schenectady, New York, to Russian Jewish parents. Sagarin was born with scoliosis, which produced a hump on his back. He attended high school and, after graduating, spent a year in France where he met André Gide. Upon his return to New York, he enrolled at City College of New York, but was forced to drop out of college due to the Great Depression.

In 1934, Sagarin met Gertrude Liphshitz, a woman who shared his left-wing political interests. They married in 1936 and soon after, Gertrude gave birth to a boy. Sagarin established himself in the perfume and cosmetics industry, becoming knowledgeable about the chemistry of perfumes, and publishing The Science and Art of Perfumery in 1945.

=== Donald Webster Cory ===
Sagarin began a dual life, publishing The Homosexual in America: A Subjective Approach in 1951, which was deemed an "act of heroism", under the pseudonym of Donald Webster Cory. The use of the pen name, and the attitudes that differed when Sagarin used either of his identities, led to the comparison of Sagarin/Cory to the Dr. Jekyll/Mr Hyde character. Mr. Cory, who presented homosexuals as a despised minority, was seen as a "mythic hero", where Dr. Sagarin (as he would later be known) was a "hunchback deviant".

The publication of the book was considered a "radical step", as it was the first publication in the United States that discussed homosexual politics and sympathetically presented the plight of homosexuals. Sagarin described how homosexuals were discriminated against in almost all aspects of their lives and called for a repeal of anti-homosexuality laws;

One great gap separates the homosexual minority from all others, and that is its lack of recognition, its lack of respectability in the eyes of the public, and even in the most advanced circles.

A research report by Alfred Kinsey et al., Sexual Behavior in the Human Male (1948), had a beneficial effect on the reception of Sagarin's publication. In 1952, due to the success of The Homosexual in America: A Subjective Approach, Sagarin established a subscription book service called "Cory Book Service", which chose a gay-themed literary work each month. The Cory Book Service played a fundamental role in sparking the gay-rights movement in the US and helped other organizations such as the Mattachine Society and ONE magazine grow. It would change ownership multiple times and would send out recommendations of queer literature for 17 years.

Sagarin continued using his pseudonym, and released a second publication in 1953 called Twenty-One Variations on a Theme, an anthology of short stories dealing with homosexuality to which included pieces by Sherwood Anderson, Paul Bowles, Christopher Isherwood, Denton Welch, Charles Jackson, and Stefan Zweig.

=== 1960s ===
In 1958, Sagarin joined Brooklyn College, completing his BA in an accelerated program, and in 1961 he entered an MA program in sociology, where he wrote a thesis on The Anatomy of Dirty Words. Throughout the 1960s, Cory remained one of the most conservative members of the Mattachine Society, and opposed the rejection of the "sickness theory" of homosexuality by some homophile leaders. His belief was that homosexuality was "a disturbance" that probably arose as a result of a pathological family situation.

Around this time, Sagarin met Barry Sheer, a student at Fairleigh Dickinson University and author for the gay press under the pseudonym John LeRoy. The two began a sexual relationship which Sheer would later compare to the book Death in Venice; Sheer admired Sagarin's writing, and Sagarin gave Sheer monetary gifts. In 1963, Sagarin and Sheer co-authored The Homosexual and His Society, which claimed that there was no such thing as a "well adjusted homosexual".

In 1965 as Cory, he failed in his bid for presidency of the Mattachine Society. The loss of the presidency, and his difference in beliefs from other members of the Society, resulted in a disparity that directly influenced his education. Sagarin entered New York University's PhD program in sociology, graduating in 1966, submitting a dissertation titled "Structure and Ideology in an Association of Deviants", which was a study of the Mattachine Society. He did not, however, reveal his involvement in the society as Cory. His acceptance of the position of assistant professor at Baruch College, a campus of City University of New York, led some to characterise it as the beginning of his rise to "giant in the field of sociological deviance" and the recession of his part in the homophile movement.

=== 1970s ===
In the 1970s, Sagarin pursued an active homosexual life, though he continued to characterise homosexuals as disturbed, and frequently urged them to seek therapy. He rejected the idea that homosexuality was a natural sexual variant, and criticised the new psychological and sociological studies of Evelyn Hooker and John Gagnon. However, he argued that homosexuality should be decriminalized.

The real identity of Sagarin's persona, Donald Webster Cory, remained unknown until a 1974 convention of the American Sociological Association in Montreal. On a panel entitled "Theoretical Perspectives on Homosexuality", Sagarin levelled criticism at the liberationist scholarship, and in response, Laud Humphreys exposed Sagarin by calling him "Mr. Cory". After the convention, Sagarin withdrew from issues concerning homosexuality.

On June 10, 1986, he died of a heart attack. At the time, he was serving as Dean Of The Graduate School Of The John Jay College of Criminal Justice in New York City.

== Literary works ==
=== Edward Sagarin ===
- The Science and Art of Perfumery (1945) New York, London: McGraw-Hill Book Company, Inc.
- The anatomy of dirty words (1962) New York: L. Stuart
- Nymphomania: a study of the oversexed woman (1964) New York: Gilbert Press (coauthor: Albert Ellis)
- A pictorial history of the world's great trials, from Socrates to Eichmann (1967) New York: Crown Publishers (coauthor: Brandt Aymar)
- Odd man in; Societies of deviants in America. Chicago: Quadrangle Books. 1969. ISBN 0-531-06344-5. OCLC 34435.
- People in places; The sociology of the familiar (1973) New York: Praeger
- Laws and trials that created history (1974) New York: Crown ISBN 0517505355
- Structure and Ideology in an Association of Deviants (1975) New York: Arno Press ISBN 0-405-07402-6
- Norms and human behavior (1976) New York: Praeger ISBN 0-275-52090-0
- Sex, crime, and the law (1977) New York: Free Press ISBN 0-02-919680-9 (coauthor: Donal E.J. MacNamara)
- Deviance and social change (1977) Beverly Hills, California: Sage Publications ISBN 0-8039-0804-0
- The Sociology of sex: An introductory reader (1978) New York: Schocken Books ISBN 0805236805 (coeditor: James M. Henslin)
- Taboos in criminology Beverly Hills, California: Sage Publications (1980) ISBN 0-8039-1513-6
- Raskolnikov and others: Literary images of crime, punishment, redemption, and atonement (1981) New York: St. Martin's Press ISBN 0-312-66397-8
- Crime and Punishment: An Introduction to Criminology: Allen, Harry E.; Paul C. Friday; Julian B. Roebuck; Edward Sagarin . Free Press, 1981 ISBN 0029004608.

=== Donald Webster Cory ===
- The Homosexual in America: A Subjective Approach (1951) New York: Greenberg. Spanish translation: Mexico City: EDIAPSA, 1952.
- Twenty-One Variations on a Theme (1953) New York: Greenberg
- Homosexuality; A cross cultural approach (1956) New York: Julian Press
- The Homosexual and his Society: A View from Within (1963) New York: Citadel Press (coauthor: John P. Leroy)
- Violation of taboo; Incest in the great literature of the past and present (1963) New York: Julian Press (coauthor: R.E.L. Masters)
- The Lesbian in America (1964) New York: Citadel Press
