= John Lehmann =

English publisher (1907–1987)

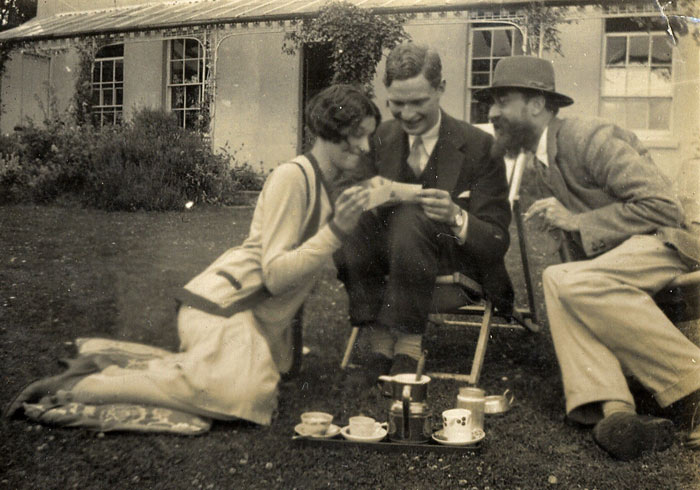
John Lehmann (seated) with sister Rosamond Lehmann and Lytton Strachey

Rudolf John Frederick Lehmann (2 June 1907 – 7 April 1987) was an English publisher, poet and man of letters. He founded the periodicals New Writing and The London Magazine, and the publishing house of John Lehmann Limited.

== Early life and education ==
Born in Bourne End, Buckinghamshire, the fourth child of journalist Rudolph Lehmann, and brother of Helen Lehmann, novelist Rosamond Lehmann and actress Beatrix Lehmann, he was educated at Eton and read English at Trinity College, Cambridge. He considered his time at both as "lost years". At Trinity, Lehmann had a passionate relationship with Virginia Woolf's nephew, Quentin Bell.

== Literary magazine founder ==
After a period as a journalist in Vienna, he returned to England to found the popular periodical New Writing (1936–40) in book format. This literary magazine sought to break down social barriers and published works by working-class authors as well as educated middle-class writers and poets. It proved a great influence on literature of the period and an outlet for writers such as Christopher Isherwood, W. H. Auden, Edward Upward and miner-author B. L. Coombes. Lehmann included many of these authors in his anthology Poems for Spain which he edited with Stephen Spender. With the onset of the Second World War and paper rationing, New Writing's future was uncertain and so Lehmann wrote New Writing in Europe for Pelican Books, one of the first critical summaries of the writers of the 1930s in which he championed the authors who had been the stars of New Writing—Auden and Spender—and also his close friend Tom Wintringham and Wintringham's ally, the emerging George Orwell. Wintringham reintroduced Lehmann to Allen Lane of Penguin Books, who secured paper for The Penguin New Writing a monthly book-magazine, this time in paperback. The first issue featured Orwell's essay "Shooting an Elephant". Occasional hardback editions combined with the magazine Daylight appeared sporadically, but it was as Penguin New Writing that the magazine survived until 1950.

== Publisher ==
He joined Leonard and Virginia Woolf as managing director of Hogarth Press between 1938 and 1946. He then established his own publishing company, John Lehmann Limited, with his novelist sister Rosamond Lehmann (who had a nine-year affair with one of Lehmann's contributing poets, Cecil Day-Lewis). They published new works by authors such as Jean-Paul Sartre and Nikos Kazantzakis, and discovered talents like Thom Gunn and Laurie Lee. Lehmann edited two anthologies of new writing entitled Orpheus: A Symposium of the Arts (1948–49). He also published the first two books by the cookery writer Elizabeth David, A Book of Mediterranean Food and French Country Cooking. He published two of Denton Welch's posthumous works: A Voice Through a Cloud (for which he supplied the title) (1950) and A Last Sheaf (1951). This publishing house published several book series, including the Chiltern Library, the Holiday Library, the Modern European Library, and the Library of Art and Travel. It operated from 1946–1953.

== Autobiographer ==
In 1954, he founded The London Magazine, remaining as editor until 1961, following which he was a frequent lecturer and completed his three-volume autobiography, Whispering Gallery (1955), I Am My Brother (1960) and The Ample Proposition (1966). In The Purely Pagan Sense (1976) is an autobiographical record of his homosexual life in England and pre-war Germany, discreetly written in the form of a novel. He also wrote the biographies Edith Sitwell (1952), Virginia Woolf and her World (1975), Thrown to the Woolfs (1978), Rupert Brooke (1980) and Christopher Isherwood. A Personal Memoir (1987). His book Three Literary Friendships (1983), deals with the relationships between Lord Byron and Percy Shelley, Arthur Rimbaud and Paul Verlaine, Robert Frost and Edward Thomas.

In 1965, he published Christ the Hunter, a spiritual/autobiographical prose poem which had been broadcast in 1964 on the BBC Third Programme. In 1974, Lehmann published a book of poems, The Reader at Night, hand-printed on handmade paper and hand-bound in an edition of 250 signed copies (Toronto, Basilike, 1974). An essay by Paul Davies about the creation of this book is included in Professor A.T. Tolley's collection, John Lehmann: A Tribute (Ottawa; Carleton University Press, 1987), which also includes pieces by Roy Fuller, Thom Gunn, Charles Osborne, Christopher Levenson, Jeremy Reed, George Woodcock, and others.

== Personal Life and Death ==
John Lehmann was for many years the partner of the ballet dancer Alexis Rassine. Lehmann died in London on 7 April 1987, aged 79.

== Poets featured in Penguin New Writing ==
- W. H. Auden
- George Barker
- David Gascoyne
- Robert Graves
- Bernard Gutteridge
- Norman Hampson
- John Heath-Stubbs
- Hamish Henderson
- Pierre Jean Jouve
- Laurie Lee
- Alun Lewis
- C. Day-Lewis
- Lawrence Little
- Federico García Lorca
- David Luke
- Joseph Macleod
- Louis MacNeice
- Ewart Milne
- Nicholas Moore
- Norman Nicholson
- William Plomer
- Pandelis Prevelakis
- F. T. Prince
- Henry Reed
- Anne Ridler
- Alan Ross
- May Sarton
- George Seferis
- Jaroslav Seifert
- Edith Sitwell
- Stephen Spender
- Randall Swingler
- A. S. J. Tessimond
- Dylan Thomas
- Dunstan Thompson
- Terence Tiller
- Robert Waller
- Peter Yates

== See also ==
- List of Bloomsbury Group people

== Bibliography ==
- Tolley, A. T., ed. (1987). John Lehmann: A Tribute. McGill–Queen's University Press. ISBN 978-0-7735-9592-7.
- Adrian Wright, John Lehmann: A Pagan Adventure (London: Duckworth, 1998)
- Gale Literary Databases,"(Rudolph) John (Frederick) Lehmann,"
- David Hughes. "Lehmann, (Rudolph) John Frederick (1907-1987),"
- Petra Rau, University of Portsmouth. "John Lehmann." The Literary Encyclopedia. 21 Mar. 2002. The Literary Dictionary Company.
