= Forman Brown =

American puppeteer

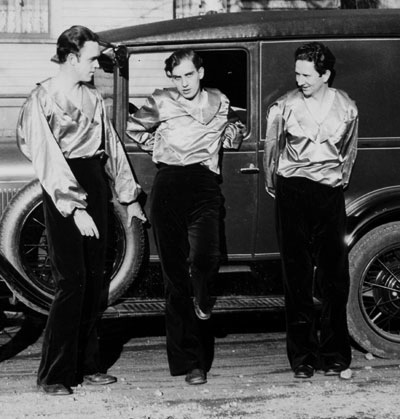
Forman Brown, Harry Burnett and Roddy Brandon

Forman Brown (January 8, 1901 – January 10, 1996) was one of the world's leaders in puppet theatre in his day, as well as an important early gay novelist. He was a member of the Yale Puppeteers and the driving force behind Turnabout Theatre. He was born in Otsego, Michigan. He briefly taught at North Carolina State College, followed by an extensive tour of Europe.

Forman's Yale Puppeteers, which he established upon graduating from University of Michigan (class of 1922), opened a puppet theatre in Los Angeles in 1941 (the Turnabout Theater) that attracted celebrity attention and support from some of Hollywood's biggest names, e.g., Greta Garbo, Colleen Moore, Marie Dressler, Mary Pickford and Douglas Fairbanks, as well as other notable figures including Albert Einstein and Aimee Semple McPherson. Brown wrote all the songs and sketches for the troupe's productions. Regular performers included Elsa Lanchester and Odetta. Bette Midler sang one of Forman's songs, Mrs. Pettibone, at a Los Angeles AIDS benefit.

Along with Yale Puppeteers Harry Burnett and Richard Brandon (1905 – May 4, 1985) (Brown's lifelong lover), Brown launched Turnabout Theatre in 1941 as "a vehicle for performing both puppet plays and revues for adults." Turnabout Theatre was a highly popular puppetry venue until its dissolution in 1956. Reversible seats were installed in the theatre so that after the puppet shows were performed at one end of the auditorium, the puppeteers asked the audience to "turnabout" their seats for the Turnabout revue staged at the opposite end of the auditorium.

In 1933, he wrote Better Angel, under the pseudonym Richard Meeker, about a young man coming to terms with his homosexuality. The novel is regarded as "the first American novel to present the 'gay' experience in a healthy light." When it was reprinted in 1995, under the assumption that the author was no longer alive, Brown stepped forward and acknowledged the novel was heavily autobiographic: that the main character, Kurt, was indeed himself; that one of the main character's love interests, Derry, was Brown's cousin, Harry Burnett; that Kurt's main love interest, David, was Richard Brandon; and that another of Kurt's lovers, Tony, was actor Alexander Kirkland.

== Broadway songs ==
- Home Sweet Homer (4 January 1976) | lyrics by Forman Brown
- Music in My Heart (2 October 1947 – 24 January 1948) | lyrics by Forman Brown
- The Red Mill (16 October 1945 – 18 January 1947) | additional lyrics by Forman Brown

He also wrote the book and lyrics for the Richard Rodgers/Lincoln Center revival of The Merry Widow.

== Filmography ==
- I Am Suzanne! (1933) | uncredited songwriter (with Friedrich Hollaender): "Gay St. Moritz Is the Place", "Eski-olay-lio-mo"
- Bandits and Ballads (1934) | writer
- An Old Spanish Onion (1935) | writer

== Published works ==
- The Generous Jefferson Bartleby Jones (1991), ISBN 1-55583-198-2
- Small Wonder: The Story of the Yale Puppeteers and the Turnabout Theatre (Scarecrow Press, 1980), ISBN 0-8108-1334-3
- The Pie-Eyed Piper and Other Impertinent Plays for Puppets (Greenberg Publisher, 1933)
- Better Angel (Greenberg Publisher, 1933), written under pseudonym Richard Meeker
- Punch's Progress (The Macmillan Company, 1936)
- Spider Kin (Robert Packard, 1929)
- Walls (Self-published, 1922)
