= Serenade (novel) =

1937 novel by James M. Cain

- Cover of the first edition
- Author: James M. Cain
- Language: English
- Genre: Hardboiled novel
- Publisher: Alfred A. Knopf
- Publication date: 1937
- Publication place: United States
- Media type: Print (hardcover and paperback)
- ISBN: 0-679-72323-4

Serenade is a novel by James M. Cain published in 1937 by Alfred A. Knopf. and one of four Cain novels to feature opera as a plot device. Loosely based on Bizet's Carmen, the story explores the sources of artistic development, in particular the role played by sexual orientation in the development of artistic talent. Regarded as one of his most significant works, Serenade has been called "Cain's finest sustained piece of writing."

== Plot Summary ==
John Howard Sharp, a once-successful American opera singer who lost his singing voice, is down-and-out in a Mexican café when he encounters the attractive Indio prostitute, Juana Montes. Sharp is attracted to Juana and wins her from a local bullfighter, Triesca. She takes Sharp to a brothel. When he sings excerpts from Bizet's Carmen, Juana's interest in him cools: she detects something unmanly in his performance. The pair part ways, and he continues his penurious existence.

Several months later, Juana wins 500 pesos and a new Ford roadster in a lottery. She plans to open a café-bordello in Acapulco catering to American tourists under the auspices of a politically connected kingpin. She enlists Sharp to be bartender, bouncer and bookkeeper for the establishment, in part because she suspects that he is sexually ambivalent and will not harass the female employees.

En route to Acapulco, the pair make a detour in the country to pick up food supplies from Juana's parents. As night falls, a storm breaks over the couple and the roadster becomes trapped by flood waters. Discovering a remote, abandoned Catholic church, Sharp crashes the car through its locked double doors to find shelter. He parks the car in front of the altar, exchanges his wet clothing for a priest's cassock and pilfers sacristy candles for utility lighting. Juana is initially appalled at the sacrilege.

Sharp makes a charcoal fire in the vestry and prepares a meal from their provisions. Juana joins him and they become intoxicated on sacramental wine. Superstitious, she becomes hysterical at hearing peals of thunder. Sharp attempts to calm her by playing the organ and singing the Nona Nobis as the storm rages, which Juana disparages. Juana disrobes and makes an "Aztec" offering before the altar, upon which Sharp then rapes her.

Unable to depart due to the flooding, they spend a second day at the church. Juana catches an iguana and, ritualistically, they prepare it for a meal. The iguana meat acts as an aphrodisiac and they make love. Sharp again sings and Juana assures him that he has been restored to his former vocal prowess. Sharp falls in love with Juana.

Determined to return to the United States to resume his operatic career, Sharp arranges passage for himself and Juana on the steamer Port of Cobh, operated by Captain Conners. At their hotel, the kingpin appears and demands sexual favors from Juana. Sharp intercedes and knocks the kingpin unconscious. The couple flee in the roadster. Conners intercepts the fugitives and clandestinely escorts them to Port of Cobh, on which they embark for San Pedro, California. Conners cunningly secrets the undocumented Juana past immigration officials, pledging to assist the couple in the event of a crisis.

Sharp begins to explore the market for opera singers in Hollywood, but agents show little interest in him. He resorts to performing in nightclubs. Desperately low on money, Sharp and Juana attend a performance of Carmen at the Hollywood Bowl. During the first act, a singer is suddenly pulled from the stage. Though undetected by the audience, Sharp instantly recognizes that the baritone has become incapacitated. Familiar with the part, Sharp offers to fill in. The conductor, though skeptical, allows him to sing. Sharp's performance is a grand success.

A studio executive immediately signs Sharp to a lucrative contract to sing in motion pictures. His debut film, a B-Western, is a critical and box office success. The studio is outraged when Sharp insists on $50,000 for his next feature, but they accept the terms on a three-picture contract. His movie career ascendant, Sharp introduces Juana to Hollywood society at co-star Elsa Chadwick's celebrity party. Juana, dressed in florid Indio garments, is deemed gauche by the hostess and shunned by the female guests. Furious, Sharp declines to sing and prepares to leave with Juana. Elsa insults Juana, causing Sharp to slap her and leave.

Deeply disillusioned with Hollywood, Sharp is informed that the Metropolitan Opera wishes to put him under contract. After a protracted struggle with his agent and the studio executive Rex Gold, Sharp is emphatically denied a temporary release to perform with the Metropolitan. Defying them, he bolts to New York and performs in all the standard repertoire that season, to great acclaim. The studio initiates litigation against Sharp for breach of contract. Sharp is urged to comply with his Hollywood obligations or cease singing with the Metropolitan. The crisis is at an impasse when Sharp receives a phone call which Juana, preternaturally, urges him not to answer; the caller is Winston Hawes.

Hawes is both a talented conductor and a music teacher who had mentored the young Sharp in Paris. He is also an entrepreneur who regards music as a commodity to be exploited: "He made a whore out of it." When Sharp realized that his dependency on Hawes had become a humiliating addiction, the quality of his voice deteriorated, resulting in his self-imposed exile in Mexico. Hawes informs Sharp that he has already booked him for a performance in New York. Sharp is loath to comply with the domineering Hawes, but Juana encourages him to go.

Sharp suddenly suspects, and Hawes confesses, that he monitored Sharp's activities in Mexico and personally engineered his movie career in order to maneuver Sharp into performing opera in New York – under Hawe's auspices. During an elaborately organized production of Damrosch's Mandalay conducted by Hawes, Sharp performs beautifully until a moment in an encore, in which he momentarily reverts to his "priest"-like voice. Juana, who is in the audience, detects the lapse. She confronts Sharp on the nature of his relationship with Hawes, accusing them of being lovers. Sharp confesses to Juana his former homosexual desires and begs Juana to not abandon him. They make passionate love for two days, exorcising Hawes' influence.

Hawes continues to pursue Sharp, taking a suite down the hall from the couple's hotel room. Hawes' persistent and unannounced visits to their apartment unnerves Sharp. Nevertheless, the couple accepts an invitation to his housewarming party. Juana arrives sporting an authentic bullfighter's cape. Juana and Hawes engage in an elaborate and comic pantomime of a bullfight, Juana playing the toreador and Hawes playing the bull. During the entertainment, Sharp is alerted by a bellboy that an immigration agent is on the premises to arrest Juana. Sharp realizes that Hawes had tipped off the agent and urges Juana to escape. Enacting a mock bullfight, Juana impales Hawes with her sword, killing him.

Sharp is released after police questioning but is kept under heavy surveillance. Conners phones Sharp and they communicate on an untapped phone: Juana is safely in port aboard Port of Cobh. When the couple reunite, she tells Sharp she must flee alone, but he insists on joining her. Conners cautions him that in his company she is "doomed." Sharp and Juana begin a life as fugitives and settle in Guatemala. Juana recognizes that she and Sharp are deteriorating together in isolation and urges him emphatically to leave her. They grow apart and cease sleeping together.

Struggling with his sexual identity, Sharp visits a brothel to reaffirm his heterosexuality. Juana begins to work as a prostitute at the same brothel and taunts Sharp with the fact. Sharp assaults her and she flees from their home. Hopelessly dependent upon Juana, Sharp pursues her in desperation. He finally discovers she has taken an airplane to Mexico City. There, Sharp spots her at a cafe in the company of Triesca, who mocks him with a falsetto voice. Sharp retaliates with a powerful and moving rendition of "Cielito Lindo" directed toward Juana. The cafe patrons react with wild applause.

Unwittingly, Sharp's performance instantly reveals his identity to the authorities. The kingpin from Acapulco appears and vengefully guns down Juana. Sharp escapes punishment due to his celebrity status but realizes he has been instrumental in the death of the woman he loves. He transports Juana's coffin to the rural church where he had fallen in love with her. Racked by guilt, Sharp declines the priest's request that he sing at the sacrament: "Never again" he declares.

== Publication history ==
Shortly after selling his story "Two Can Sing" to Liberty magazine in 1936, Cain took the proceeds and traveled to Mexico and Guatemala to collect material for a novel whose working title was Sombra y Sol ("Shadow and Sun"). The story that emerged is "the most controversial" of Cain's work.

Exploring Guatemala City, Cain encountered a prostitute upon whose physical attractiveness and dignified manners—"a perfect dame"—he would base the character Juana (a diminutive of the Spanish word iguana according to Cain). He also surveyed the region around Acapulco, Mexico, locating a small rural church that matched his literary image where he would set his "infamous" love scene. He consulted meteorologists to confirm that the vicinity experienced torrential rains that could strand his protagonists.

Cain examined an Indio dwelling to gain insights into the culture of indigenous people, providing him with "the general theme of the book, which was the triumph of a primitive Mexican girl who was wise—though ignorant—over the complicated, apparently civilized world of the other characters."

Serenade was completed in July 1937, and publisher Alfred A. Knopf Sr., describing the work as "magnificent", rushed it into print by December of that year.

== Critical Analysis ==
=== Characterizations of hetero- and homosexuality ===
Serenade provoked an intense controversy when it appeared in 1938 over his treatment of the "sensational" topic of homosexuality and creativity. Condemned by the Catholic Church, the book elicited approval by those medical professionals consulted by Cain. This element of Cain's plot conceit was in his day "startling subject matter." According to biographer and literary critic Roy Hoopes, the central theme of the book is "the conflict in Sharp between his latent homosexuality and his [heterosexual] love for Juana, and the impact of this struggle on his voice." When Cain consulted medical professionals concerning his plot conceit—that homosexual singers were artistically handicapped—he was reassured by his contemporaries that it had legitimacy. He proceeded to develop the story on this pseudo-scientific premise. Biographer Paul Skenazy writes:

Serenade is based on what today is recognized as an entirely false premise: that a person's sexual persuasion directly affects his or her artistic capacity...reviewers at the time, eager to comment on the novel's sensationalism, did not object to Cain's treatment of homosexuality as a debilitating weakness. From our present point of view, however, Cain's homophobia seems significant only as a reminder of our national homophobia.

Skenazy adds that "the success of the book seems a result of Cain's complete investment of the preposterous assumptions that underlie the action."

Disparaging portrayals of homosexuals were not uncommon among Cain's literary colleagues, among them Ernest Hemingway, Dashiell Hammett and Raymond Chandler.

=== The "church scene" ===
The scene in Serenade that contributed to the book's notoriety is the action that occurs in a small, rural Catholic church, which includes a brutal sexual encounter between Sharp and Juana on the altar.

As Sharp drives further from civilization, arriving at a remote rural Catholic church in search of shelter, Juana progressively sheds the trapping of the city and reverts to her Indio roots. After forcibly entering the church, Sharp, who served as a Catholic choirboy in his youth, continues to genuflect as he passes the altar which is now illuminated by the headlights of the parked roadster. Disrobed and fearing retribution, Juana prepares an "Aztec" offering of poultry eggs and corn to placate her deity. Sharp completes his sacrilege by raping Juana. Paul Skenazy writes:

...the strange mixtures of spiritualism and lust frequently found in Cain's early work, primitive violation combined with pagan idolatry culminate in the church scene in Serenade [enacting] a hedonistic return to the church through Juana's body as a kind of sexual sacrament."

When the couple prepare an iguana for a meal "Sharp smears [Juana's] nipples with Iguana grease" and feeds upon her breasts, reviving Sharp's manhood and his ability to achieve his former talents as a singer.

=== The Mock Bullfight scene ===
Cain presents a contest set in a posh New York City apartment pitting Juana against Sharp's nemesis, Winston Hawes.

The contestants represent two diametrically opposed and irreconcilable social and cultural outlooks: Hawes, that of "cosmopolitanism, wealth, exploitative power, and sexual abnormality" and Juana, that of a "prehistoric" and "primitive" world that is guided by intuition, instinct, and preternatural power derived from nature. Paul Skenazy notes that "The battle between Juana and Hawes for Sharp's soul is not only a battle of homo- and heterosexuality, but between two radically different sets of artistic and ethical principles, and between modern and primitive worlds."

Sharp's sexual ambivalence is revealed when Juana must act as his champion to destroy the threat to her lover's manhood. In murdering Hawes, Juana sets in motion events that lead to her own death: a death that in turn destroys Sharp's ability to sing. Author and literary critic Joyce Carol Oates writes:

If the unconscious wish of Serenade is to be a man, free from homosexual weakness, surely the unconscious wish is to destroy whatever threatens this weakness—obviously the female who prevents the comfortable, illicit relationship with the male lover, artist, musician, man of taste, of wealth, etc.

Paul Skenazy offers this analysis:

The scene in which Juana kills Hawes "reveals Sharp's complete dependency on Juana for his masculinity...that dependency, disguised as love and gratitude…seems to replace his addiction to Hawes with an equally debased need for Juana…This is the Cain paradox…Sharp fears he cannot remain powerful without Juana. Yet with Juana he cannot sing and so loses his identity."

== Adaptations of Serenade ==
Several studios expressed interest in obtaining the film rights to Serenade upon its publication, including Metro-Goldwyn-Mayer and Columbia Pictures. Cain prepared a treatment that expunged the homosexual themes and shifted them to alcoholism so as to make it acceptable to the Hays Office. In 1944, Warner Brothers studios paid $35,000 for the rights, considering Humphrey Bogart for the role of John Howard Sharp. Cain, who had sold the rights of seven of his books to Hollywood since 1933, was skeptical about the adaptability of the Serenade to film. Biographer Roy Hoopes reports that "Cain always maintained that Serenade was almost impossible to produce as either a movie or a stage play." Cain declined a request by Oscar Hammerstein II to develop Serenade as a musical.

In 1956 Warner Bros. released a "pale version" of under the same title, starring Mario Lanza, Joan Fontaine and Vincent Price. Biographer David Madden judged Cain's novel "incredibly mutilated" by the studio. In 1948, composer Leonard Bernstein attempted to enlist Cain's participation in making a "grand opera" based on the novel. Cain supported the project, but declined to write the libretto. Bernstein and associates obtained an option on Serenade to make a musical. After years of negotiations with Cain's agent, Bernstein shifted his attention to the production of West Side Story.

== See also ==
- Lost Gay Novels

== Sources ==
- Cain, James M. 1989. Three by Cain: Serenade, Love's Lovely Counterfeit, The Butterfly. Vintage Books. New York. ISBN 0-679-72323-4
- Hoopes, Roy. 1981. The Baby in the Icebox and Other Short Fiction by James M. Cain. Holt, Rinehart & Winston. New York. ISBN 0-03058501-5
- Hoopes, Roy. 1982. Cain. Holt, Rinehart and Winston. New York. ISBN 0-03-049331-5
- Hoopes, Roy. 1986. Career in C Major and Other Fiction. McGraw-Hill Book Company. New York. ISBN 0-07-009593-0
- Madden, David. 1970. James M. Cain. Twayne Publishers, Inc. Library Catalog Card Number: 78-120011.
- Skenazy, Paul. 1989. James M. Cain. Continuum Publishing Company. New York. ISBN 0-8044-2821-2
