= Turnabout Theatre =

American marionette puppeteer company

The Turnabout Theatre was a company of marionette puppeteers who performed in Hollywood from 1941 through 1956. The company's shows began with marionette performances, and concluded with a revue.

The name of the theater derives in part from the fact that the theater seats were former streetcar seats that could be turned to face a puppet stage at one end or the live revue stage at the other. Adjacent seats were labeled with humorous names (e.g., "Hot 'n Bothered," "Salt 'n Pepper," etc.), and after intermission theater-goers would "turn about" to see the show continued at the opposite end of the house.

The Theater originated with a group known as the Yale Puppeteers composed notably of Forman Brown, Harry Burnett, and Richard (Roddy) Brandon. Many artists, some quite well known or soon to be well known also participated, including Odetta and Elsa Lanchester, whose brother Waldo Lanchester was a famous puppeteer in the UK.

The history of the theater is documented in the film, Turnabout: the Story of the Yale Puppeteers, directed by Dan Bessie (a nephew of Harry Burnett). Brown wrote a book about the puppet troupe, and Bessie discussed the puppeteers in his memoir of his family, Rare Birds.

Prior to opening Turnabout Theatre, the puppeteers had toured with their shows. Their puppets also appeared in the 1933 film I Am Suzanne.

Harry Burnett was the brother of advertising executive Leo Burnett.
