= Better Angel =

1933 book by Forman Brown

Better Angel is a novel by Forman Brown first published in 1933 under the pseudonym Richard Meeker. It was republished as Torment in 1951. It is an early novel which describes a gay lifestyle without condemning it. Christopher Carey called it "the first homosexual novel with a truly happy ending".

The novel's title references Shakespeare's Sonnet 144: "the better angel is a man right fair", a poem which has been read as having a homosexual subtext.

== Publication history ==
Brown's novel was published pseudonymously in 1933 and attracted little critical attention. Universal paperbacks re-published it 1951 under the title Torment. The blurb on the cover read: "Is it evil for one man to lavish affection on another? Torn between the boy who cherished him and the girl who struggled for his love, Kurt Gray could not be sure." The Mattachine Review described Kurt as "perhaps the healthiest homosexual in print". Alyson Publications published the novel again in 1987 under its original title with an introduction by Hubert Kennedy. Brown was unaware of the 1987 edition; his copyright had expired, and the novel could be printed and sold without his permission. He learned of its appearance from a friend who reported seeing it in a bookstore. He provided an epilogue for the 1990 reprint of the 1987 edition in which he explained that he used a pseudonym decades earlier to protect his writing career at CBS and to shield his parents.

== Plot ==
The novel is a Bildungsroman recounting the passage of Kurt Gray—his surname plays on the author's Brown—from his adolescent years in central Michigan to mature adult and his development as a musician and composer. Kurt's teenage years are marked by "solitude, bookish seriousness, gender dislocation, and religion", a dislike of sports, and an interest in amateur theatricals. He memorizes Bible stories and experiences a Christian awakening that transforms into a spiritual devotion to poetry and music. At the University of Michigan, he has his first same-sex experiences and discovers the poetry of Swinburne, "a revelation". After graduating he explores the psychological literature of Jung, Freud, and Ellis, then Edward Carpenter, Plato's Phaedrus and Symposium, and Oscar Wilde. Kurt identifies a contrast between American religiosity and an alternative offered by the Europeans he reads, which he identifies as spiritual, even preferring the French spirituel: "The English never had created so exact a word for it."

The novel describes the love affair between Kurt and another man Derry, and their relationship with a third man, David. Brown later said that it was in the main autobiographical, that he based Kurt on himself, Derry on Harry Burnett, David on his long-time partner Richard "Roddy" Brandon, and fourth major character, Tony, on actor Alexander Kirkland. Brown and Burnett were lovers for 60 years, beginning in 1926. All three of them worked together in the Yale Puppeteers on tour and then in their base at the Turnabout Theatre in Los Angeles.

== Treatment of homosexuality ==
Homosexual themes in literature were becoming more common in the 1930s, following the example of writers such as Clarkson Crane and Carl van Vechten in the 1920s. Nevertheless, many works from the 1930s with a homosexual theme remained unpublished until much later. This novel stands out from its contemporaries in allowing its gay protagonist a happy ending.

The novel does not portray any sexual activity. It includes the word homosexual only once and uses the word queer a few times in a way that suggests homosexual. Kurt's early discovery of masturbation is described in euphemisms, and he reads Bible passages—the stories of Onan, David, Sodom, Lot—"that suggested hidden knowledge". Brown describes his reaction: "He felt, though he had never been told, that what he did was wrong." The subject is developed as the prime motivation of his religious conversion.

== Critical response ==
The Continuum Encyclopedia of American Literature (2005) called it "rather artless", but still a cut above the usual sensationalist and exploitative treatment of homosexuality in other works of the same period.

Donovan R. Walling listed the novel in 2003 as a homosexual coming-of-age novel that might be of interest for classroom reading.

== See also ==
- Lost Gay Novels
