= In Youth is Pleasure =

British autobiographical novels

- First edition
- Author: Denton Welch
- Cover artist: Denton Welch
- Language: English
- Genre: Autobiographical novel
- Publisher: Routledge
- Publication date: 1945
- Publication place: United Kingdom
- Media type: Print (Hardback)
- Pages: 154

In Youth is Pleasure is the second published novel by the English writer and painter Denton Welch. It was first published in February 1945 by Routledge. It was also his last novel issued in his lifetime.

== Background ==
The title comes from a poem by the sixteenth century English poet Robert Wever. As originally published, the dustjacket, endpapers and frontispiece were designed by Welch. The frontispiece bears a dedication to his late mother, who died when he was eleven, using her maiden name, Rosalind Bassett.

In Youth is Pleasure differs from Welch's other novels and most of his short stories, in that it is written in the third person. Set "several years" before World War II, which Welch's biographer Michael De-la-Noy has determined is 1930, it tells the story of a fifteen-year-old boy, Orvil Pym, who spends a summer holiday at a country hotel outside London with his widowed father and two older brothers. As with virtually everything Welch wrote, it is strongly autobiographical, leading several commentators to state that Orvil is Denton Welch. The original typescript bore the subtitle "A Fragment of Life Story with Changed Names". Welch himself identified the principal location as the Oatlands Hotel, Weybridge, and both the pet cemetery and the grotto are real. Welch remained attached to the place until the end of his life and lamented the demolition of the grotto ("the wickedly neglected, enchanted little corner!") sometime before May 1948. The hotel still exists, as do the pet cemetery's headstones, though they have been relocated.

== Summary ==
The novel tells the story of a fifteen-year-old boy's summer vacation. A limited amount of background material helps the reader understand him in his familial and social context, but the novel presents a series of episodes focused on his encounters with a series of other characters, returning periodically to his family as in a rondo. Though limited to the span of a few months, it has elements of a coming-of-age story as it focuses on the development of his character and personality. At the same time it partakes of the picaresque tradition in presenting a series of adventures or escapades, always surprising and at times outlandish. The narrator's voice avoids information outside the character's frame of reference and maintains the perspective and analytical capabilities of a very precocious schoolboy. He is, writes one critic, "a fretful child" with "fastidious aesthetic sensibility".

In Chapter One Orvil's father picks him up from school and they spend the night in Oxford, before heading to Salisbury Plain to collect his older brother Ben. In Chapter Two they arrive at the hotel where they meet Orvil's oldest brother Charles with whom he has an awkward relationship. He goes canoeing and spies on two boys who are camping with a man. He later hides in some bushes where he masturbates before being caught by an older man; later still he is jeered at by a picknicking group of young men. In Chapter Three he tries sweat therapy before dressing up in plus fours and goes out boating with his brothers. He then buys a little scent bottle and a Chinese armorial saucer in an antiques shop. In Chapter Four he borrows a bicycle and explores a church where he drinks some communion wine. He re-encounters the man he had seen earlier with the boys, who is a schoolmaster, and spends the afternoon with him in a scout hut. In Chapter Five he is charmed by a young woman called Aphra, one of Charles' friends, but at a party later sees Aphra and Charles having sex in a grotto near the hotel. Chapter Six describes Orvil's visit to the family of a schoolfriend in Hastings. In Chapter Seven he re-encounters the schoolmaster where he discloses his feelings about the loss of his mother. Finally in Chapter Eight he returns to school by train where he is bullied by an older boy before being rescued by Ben.

== Critical response ==
Contemporary reviews were mixed, perhaps less positive overall than for Welch's first novel. Writing in The Saturday Review, Basil Davenport was repelled by the "soul-sick" Orvil as a person, but praised Welch's skill in drawing out "such labyrinthine regions of the human soul". In Horizon Anna Kavan found Orvil's emotional development to be in advance of his contemporaries, despite some "infantile sadism". She praised Welch's style for its "gaiety and verve". In The Spectator, Kate O'Brien found "undistinguished adventures in self-indulgence and self pity" that made "somewhat uncomfortable reading in this tragic day". Four years later in the same journal, Jean Bailhache described the work as "personal but pulsating with life quite unadulterated, by which, of course, I mean free from any adult interposition". Welch noted in his journal that it "caused a sensation" in Lord Berners' household, but offered no further detail.

In the New York Times, Marguerite Young was disappointed that the volume so closely mirrored Maiden Voyage, but enjoyed Welch's ability to create a world through the accumulation of details: "We see the hand and then the cherry-colored fingernails — although we may never see the body. We always realise life only partially. Through a play with half-realized, unrelated details may come about a new understanding of our complex experience."

In his 1974 assessment of Welch's writing, Robert Phillips subjects In Youth is Pleasure to a Freudian analysis. James Methuen-Campbell highlighted the least sensational aspects of the novel, such as the "deeply moving" episode in Chapter Seven where Orvil gives the schoolmaster an account of the last time he saw his mother. In a similar spirit, William S. Burroughs wrote:

Denton Welch makes the reader aware of the magic that is right under his eyes, for most of the experiences he describes are of a commonplace variety: a walk, a tea, a peach melba, rain on a river, a visit to an antiques store, a picture on a biscuit tin, a bicycle ride, adolescent tears.

In 2010, John Waters praised the novel with unrestrained enthusiasm, allowing that it is "not for everybody" but devoted several pages to summarizing its story and calling it "precious", "deliciously subversive", and "graceful and astonishingly erotic".

In Youth is Pleasure continues to garner positive appraisals. In 2018, writing in the Los Angeles Review of Books, Daniel Felsenthal wrote that the novel "couples the linguistic virtuosity of modernism with a manic cast of characters, a melding reminiscent of Truman Capote's Other Voices, Other Rooms (1948) and the early work of James Purdy".
