= Michael De-la-Noy =

Michael De-la-Noy (3 April 1934 – 12 August 2002, born Michael Delanoy Walker) was a British journalist and author. He wrote more than 20 books, the most successful being The Queen Behind the Throne. De-la-Noy was also noted for being fired in 1970 as press secretary to Archbishop of Canterbury Michael Ramsey after writing an article in support of a bisexual and transvestite colonel, which was seen as too liberal for the Church of England.

== Biography ==
De-la-Noy was born in Hessle, Yorkshire, and grew up in London. He was educated at Bedford School, although he ran away at the age of 13 though this did not prevent him from accepting a commission to write the school's official history in 1999. He worked as a reporter for two local papers, the Bedfordshire Times and the Brighton and Hove Herald, before joining the employ of Anglican clergyman Timothy Beaumont. It was after this job that he went to work for Archbishop Michael Ramsey, for whom De-la-Noy became press secretary in 1967.

De-la-Noy's many books included biographies of Denton Welch (Denton Welch: The Making of a Writer, 1984), Edward Elgar (Elgar: The Man, 1984), the Queen Mother (The Queen Behind the Throne, 1994), Edward Sackville-West (Eddy: The Life of Edward Sackville-West, 1988), and the Archbishop of Canterbury (Michael Ramsey: A Portrait, 1990), and other works such as The Honours System (1985) and Acting as Friends: The Story of the Samaritans (1987).

De-la-Noy died of cancer at the age of 68; he was survived by his partner of 30 years Bruce Hodson.

== Selected bibliography ==
- Denton Welch: The Making of a Writer (1984)
- Elgar: The Man (1984)
- The Honours System (1985)
- Acting as Friends: The Story of the Samaritans (1987)
- Eddy: The Life of Edward Sackville-West (1988)
- Michael Ramsey: A Portrait (1990)
- The Queen Behind the Throne (1994)
- George IV (1998)
