= I Am Suzanne! =

1933 film

- Directed by: Rowland V. Lee
- Written by: Edwin Justus Mayer
- Produced by: Winfield Sheehan
- Starring: Lilian Harvey; Gene Raymond; Leslie Banks
- Cinematography: Lee Garmes
- Edited by: Harold D. Schuster
- Music by: Friedrich Hollaender
- Production company: Fox Film Corporation
- Distributed by: Fox Film Corporation
- Release date: December 25, 1933
- Running time: 98 minutes
- Country: United States
- Language: English

I Am Suzanne! is a 1933 American pre-Code romance film involving puppeteers in Paris written by Edwin Justus Mayer, directed by Rowland V. Lee, and starring Lilian Harvey, Gene Raymond and Leslie Banks. The picture's puppetry sequences feature the Yale Puppeteers and Podrecca's Piccoli Theater. The Museum of Modern Art in New York City owns and periodically exhibits a 35 mm print of the film while the George Eastman Museum in Rochester, New York, archives a 16 mm copy.

== Cast ==
- Lilian Harvey as Suzanne
- Gene Raymond as Tony Malatini
- Leslie Banks as Adolphe 'Baron' Herring
- Georgia Caine as Mama
- Murray Kinnell as Luigi Malatini
- Geneva Mitchell as Fifi
- Halliwell Hobbes as Dr. Lorenzo
- Edward Keane as Manager
- Lionel Belmore as Satan
- Lynn Bari as Audience member (uncredited)

== Reception ==
The film was not a success at the box office.
