= Jocelyn Brooke =

English writer and naturalist

Bernard Jocelyn Brooke (30 November 1908 – 29 October 1966) was an English writer and naturalist. He wrote several unique, semi-autobiographical novels, as well as some poetry. His most famous works include the Orchid Trilogy—The Military Orchid (1948), A Mine of Serpents (1949), and The Goose Cathedral (1950)—and The Image of a Drawn Sword (1950).

== Life and career ==
Brooke was born at Folkestone in Kent, the third child of a wine merchant, who with his wife was a Christian Scientist. Sent initially to the King's School, Canterbury, Brooke was deeply unhappy there, and ran away twice. He then was moved to Bedales School before going up to Worcester College, Oxford, Brooke's childhood revolved mostly around his principal interests of amateur botany and fireworks, in the shadow of the First World War. "When the Second World War began he enlisted in the Royal Army Medical Corps (RAMC) and became one of the pox wallahs, those working to treat venereal disease. Brooke was decorated for bravery."

Elements of his experiences, and his love of the military life, appear in most of his subsequent works, to the extent that much of his fiction can be regarded as at least partly autobiographical.

Though the Orchid Trilogy strays into a typically English vein of humour, the idyllic land of his childhood and his obsession with le paradis perdu ('paradise lost') often bring in an element of intense melancholy, something developed in paranoia and isolation in The Image of a Drawn Sword.

Brooke's biographical non-fiction focuses on other authors who shared at least some of his own sensibilities: in particular Ronald Firbank, the subject of two of his books, and Denton Welch, the first edition of whose journals Brooke edited, as well as a collection of short stories published at a time when Welch was otherwise out of print.

Brooke's reputation suffered after his death and it has never really recovered. Considered by Anthony Powell to be under-rated, some of his writings have occasionally appeared in paperback in recent years.

== The Orchid Trilogy ==
Between 1948 and 1950, The Bodley Head published three novels by Brooke, The Military Orchid, A Mine of Serpents and The Goose Cathedral. Fifteen years after his death these were published together by the Penguin fiction reprint arm King Penguin as The Orchid Trilogy, with an introduction by Anthony Powell. However, Penguin reissued them together in 2002 as The Military Orchid and Other Novels.

The books were related. In the preface to The Goose Cathedral Brooke says the book is the third volume in 'what may loosely be called a "trilogy" - though the chronology is not consecutive and each book can, I hope, be read independently of the other two.' The books, he said, were 'neither entirely fictitious nor entirely autobiographical'.

== The Military Orchid ==
After the war The Bodley Head brought out a collection of Brooke's poems, December Spring, which foreshadowed themes and subjects from as-yet-unwritten trilogy. After two early novels were rejected by publishers, Brooke's agent suggested he write a popular book about flowers with some personal anecdotes. This became The Military Orchid. Years later in the early Sixties, Brooke wrote to a friend that in the course of writing it, 'the anecdotes took command, and insisted on stringing themselves into an autobiography'. The book was written 'with breakneck speed through the cold wet summer of 1946', according to Christopher Scoble's Letters From Bishopsbourne, Three Writers in an English Village, which also deals with Joseph Conrad and Richard Hooker, though is the closest thing to a biography published about Brooke so far.

The Military Orchid begins with the author's childhood obsession with botany, orchids and, in particular, the ultra rare orchis militaris, which gives the book its title and symbolic image. It muses on the strange fancies of childhood, Brooke's secret ambition to be a soldier, and the inevitable unpleasant imposition of school days on the imaginative child. Later it moves into Brooke's war service with the Royal Army Medical Corps venereal disease department in Italy and North Africa, though the search for the rare orchid is never far away. One of the five epigraphs in the book is from a Victorian guide to orchids. The quoted description of orchis militaris has a slightly mysterious, diaphanous air, similar to the atmosphere of the book: 'Rare in Spring. Grows in chalky districts and not always there.' However, the book also has a wry vein and beautiful evocations of the Kent countryside. The aesthetic recollections of childhood have an echo of Proust about them.

The book was published to what would now be called rave reviews in 1947.

== The Goose Cathedral ==
The old Seabrook Lifeboat station, which is the defining symbol of the third novel in Brooke's Orchid Trilogy, was turned into the Boathouse Café in the 1930s. It is described thus at the end of the book: "It was a grey, chilly evening, threatening rain; by the time I reached the bottom of Hospital Hill, it was quite dark. Dimly-lighted, the Goose Cathedral loomed through the blackness; I crossed the road, and approached the back entrance, facing towards the camp. A small conservatory or 'winter garden', like some salvaged fragment of the Crystal Palace, had been built on to this side ..."

"In the faint electric light, the interior of the café seemed enormous, barn-like ... down the sides of the room were placed a number of solid, mahogany tables: the light gleamed vaguely on their polished surfaces ... I realized that I was sitting, at last, beneath the roof of the Goose Cathedral – that sinister and sacrosanct chapel-by-the-sea where, in my childhood, the enormous blue-and-red lifeboat had crouched, mysteriously, like a sea-monster in its lair."

== The Dog at Clambercrown ==
In 1955 The Bodley Head published The Dog at Clambercrown, which The Times described as Brooke's "latest autobiographical voluntary". The book is subtitled "An Excursion", and deals with two journeys which took place at a distance of time; a visit to Sicily in the fifties and his search for the eponymous country inn in a remote part of the Kent countryside as an adolescent. Anthony Powell, Brooke's friend and champion, thought it Brooke's best book. It revisits ideas and themes from the earlier Orchid Trilogy, but with perhaps an even greater confidence. In the typical Brooke manner, he holds up the narrative for critical digressions on such writers as DH Lawrence and James Joyce, making sharp and perceptive comments about both. Lawrence, Brooke thinks, was homosexual.

In his childhood the countryside behind Folkestone was seen by Brooke as a 'forbidden kingdom' and in the latter stages of the book during a hot and thundery afternoon while on an adolescent quest to find the pub, he undergoes a sexual awakening; the pub and the countryside symbolising the mystery of adult affairs.

On 15 December 1955, the Times critic – anonymous in those days – wrote in a review: "Mr. Brooke writes with the disciplined freedom that has always led him, enchanted and enchanting, round the spirals of his personal experience."

It was his last book of that type though one manuscript, possibly in the same style, remains unpublished in an American academic archive.

== Bibliography ==
Works by Brooke include:

Fiction:

- The Orchid Trilogy (registration required):
  - The Military Orchid (1948)
  - A Mine of Serpents (1949)
  - The Goose Cathedral (1950)
- The Scapegoat (registration required). The Bodley Head: London. 1948
- The Image of a Drawn Sword (1950)
- Passing of a Hero (1953)
- Private View (1954)
- The Dog at Clambercrown. The Bodley Head: London. 1955. Internet Archive link (registration required)
- The Crisis in Bulgaria, or Ibsen to the Rescue!. London: Chatto & Windus. 1956.
- Conventional Weapons. London: Faber and Faber. 1961.

Children's Fiction:

- The Wonderful Summer (1949)

Non-fiction:

- The Wild Orchids of Great Britain (1950)
- Ronald Firbank (1951)
- The Denton Welch Journals [as editor] (1952)
- The Flower in Season (1953)
- Elizabeth Bowen (1954)
- Aldous Huxley (1954)
- Ronald Firbank and John Betjeman (1962)
- Denton Welch: A Selection from his Published Works [as editor] (1963)
- The Birth of a Legend: A Reminiscence of Arthur Machen and John Ireland (1964)

Poetry:

- Six Poems (1928). [Privately printed]
- December Spring (1946)
- The Elements of Death (1952)

Journal articles:

- "Notes on the Occurrence of Orchis simia (Lamarck) in Kent". Journal of Botany (November 1938) 76: 337–341
- "A New British Species of Epipactis". [Co-authored with Francis Rose]. Journal of Botany (April 1940) 78: 81–89
