= New Writing =

British modernist magazine

- Categories: Literary magazine
- Founder: John Lehmann
- Founded: 1936
- Final issue: 1950
- Country: United Kingdom
- Language: English

New Writing was a popular literary periodical in book format founded in 1936 by John Lehmann and committed to anti-fascism.

It featured leading poets and writers of the day such as W.H. Auden, V.S. Pritchett, Christopher Isherwood, Tom Wintringham, Stephen Spender, Ahmed Ali, Jim Phelan, Rex Warner, and B. L. Coombes. New Writing also published articles about Mass-Observation by Tom Harrisson.

After having been approached by Lehmann to contribute a piece to the periodical, George Orwell developed a "sketch" he had had in mind for some time, and which appeared as "Shooting an Elephant", first published in the second number of the periodical, in Autumn 1936. A second piece by Orwell, "Marrakech", appeared in the Christmas 1939 edition.

== Penguin New Writing ==
With New Writing's future uncertain, Lehmann wrote New Writing in Europe for Pelican Books, a critical summary of the writers of the 1930s. Wintringham reintroduced Lehmann to Allen Lane of Penguin Books, who secured paper for Penguin New Writing, a monthly book-magazine, this time as a paperback, and which survived until 1950.
