= Denton Welch =

British writer and painter (1915-1948)

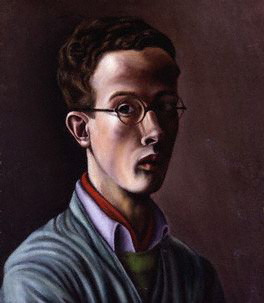
- Self-Portrait (c.1940–42; National Portrait Gallery, London)
- Born: Maurice Denton Welch; 29 March 1915; Shanghai, Republic of China
- Died: 30 December 1948 (aged 33); Middle Orchard, Crouch, near Sevenoaks, Kent, England
- Occupations: Writer, painter
- Partner: Eric Oliver (6 October 1914 – 1 April 1995)

Maurice Denton Welch (29 March 1915 – 30 December 1948) was a British writer and painter, admired for his vivid prose and precise descriptions.

== Life ==
Welch was born in Shanghai, China, to Arthur Joseph Welch, a wealthy British rubber merchant, and his American wife of Christian Science faith, Rosalind Bassett from New Bedford, Massachusetts. The youngest of four sons, Welch was sent to a boarding school at the age of 11, after his mother died from wasting kidney disease.

After a brief time at prep school in London, Welch was sent to Repton, where he was a contemporary of the writer Roald Dahl and actor Geoffrey Lumsden. By his and others' accounts, his time there was miserable, and he ran away prior to his last term. After leaving Repton, he studied art at Goldsmiths in London with the intention of becoming a painter.

Welch spent part of his pre-school childhood in China, and returned for a longer spell after he left Repton. He recorded this episode in his fictionalised autobiography, Maiden Voyage (1943). It became, with the help and patronage of Edith Sitwell and John Lehmann, a small but lasting success and won him a distinct and individual reputation. He followed it with the novel In Youth is Pleasure (1944), a study of adolescence published in a limited edition by Herbert Read at the publishers Faber and Faber and then more widely by Routledge. Read said he was happy to publish the book, and enjoyed it himself, but he warned Welch that many people would find its hero perverse and unpleasant. A collection of short stories entitled Brave and Cruel followed (1948).

The bulk of Welch's output was published posthumously: the unfinished autobiographical novel A Voice Through a Cloud in 1950; another short story collection, A Last Sheaf, in 1951; The Denton Welch Journals in 1952; an unfinished travelogue, I Left My Grandfather's House in 1958; and a poetry collection, Dumb Instrument, in 1976.

== Accident and literary work ==
At the age of 20, Welch was hit by a car while cycling in Surrey and suffered a fractured spine. He was temporarily paralysed, and suffered severe pain and bladder complications, including pyelonephritis, and spinal tuberculosis that ultimately led to his early death.

After the accident, Welch spent time at the National Hospital for Neurology and Neurosurgery and then was relocated to Southcourt Nursing Home in Broadstairs, Kent. In July 1936, Welch rented an apartment with his friend and housekeeper Evelyn Sinclair in Tonbridge so that he could be close to his doctor, John Easton. Sinclair travelled with him to various residences until May 1946, when he settled in one of the Noël and Bernard Adeney residences in Middle Orchard, Borough Green with his partner, Eric Oliver. Two years later, Sinclair moved in as well, and remained with him until his death on 30 December 1948.

Despite his injuries, he continued to paint, and perhaps because of them, he started to write. In 1940, he began to write poems, the first one appearing in print in 1941. In August 1942, he wrote an essay on the painter Walter Sickert which, published originally in Horizon, brought him to the notice of Edith Sitwell, in no small part down to his own cultivation of her attentions. Scores of short stories followed, around a dozen being published in various magazines. Many more were left unfinished at the time of his death.

Welch's literary work, intense and introverted, has been described as Proustian in its attention to the minutiae of life, in particular that of the English countryside during World War II. A close attention to aesthetics, be it in human behaviour, physical appearance, clothing, art, architecture, jewellery, or antiques, is also a recurring concern in his writings.

The extent to which Welch's work is autobiography or fiction has been much discussed, apart from his frequent use of the first person (and in some cases is identified in the narrative as "Denton"). Fictional content aside, the point of origin of virtually all of his stories is biographical: they are often set in places he knew or had visited, and feature thinly disguised, often deeply unflattering, depictions of friends, family and acquaintances (to the extent that over thirty years after Welch's death, his art school friend, the artist Gerald Leet, refused to contribute to Michael De-la-Noy's biography, where he is identified only as 'Gerald' in the index.). Welch chose to depict himself a few times in fictionalised form, most notably as "Orvil Pym" in In Youth is Pleasure, and as "Mary" in "The Fire in the Wood". "Robert" was also one of his favourite personas. The philosopher Maurice Cranston, who had known him since his teens (and who featured in at least one story) observed that Welch was as unforgiving in depictions of himself as he was of others.

== Art ==
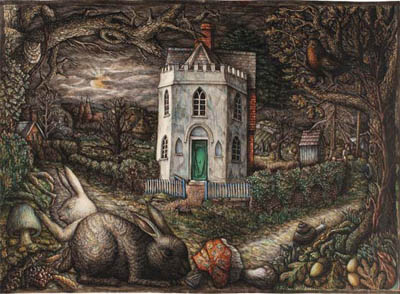
The Coffin House by Denton Welch (1946, private collection)

From an early age Welch's aptitude for art was evident, and in his journals he recalls his first still life (holly and beech leaves), completed when he was nine. However, his enrolment at Goldsmith's came initially out of his family's desire that he do something with his life after his return from China, any sort of activity associated with business evidently being ruled out of the question. It was through a fellow student that Welch sold his first artwork: a view of Hadlow Castle to Shell for a series of lorry posters featuring landmarks. It is now on display at the National Motor Museum at Beaulieu, Hampshire. He later failed to sell a painting of Lord Berners to its subject, but the experience generated a short story.

Common themes in his art include objets d'art, cats, still lifes (often incongruously juxtaposed) and assorted gothic motifs, often in a fantastical landscape, although not in one of his most famous works, The Coffin House (1946) depicting a locally renowned dwelling, north of Hadlow, Kent. Welch exhibited his artwork at the Leicester Galleries. Other exhibitions followed, in The Redfern Gallery and the Leger Gallery.

In May 1945, Welch restored an 18th-century Georgian doll's house from 1783, which was given to him by his friend Mildred Bosanquet. The doll's house is on display at the V&A Museum of Childhood, department of the Victoria and Albert Museum.

Opinions on Welch's artworks have varied widely: amongst his biographers, Michael De-la-Noy and James Methuen-Campbell consider him to be underrated; in Robert Phillips' view his paintings are "lightweight" and his drawings "fussy and shallow". For Jocelyn Brooke, had he been a painter merely, and not also a writer, "it is doubtful ... whether he would be remembered at all."

In a perceptive review of the reproductions in A Last Sheaf, the un-named Times art critic remarked on the "whimsically sinister" qualities of Welch's depictions. The writer noted that Welch's specific skill—that of the detached but perceptive observer—which is so evident in his writings, is lost in his art, where he inadvertently (and falsely) appears to present "himself [as] clever to like what most people would think preposterous." A painting such as Now I have only my dog,

... is easy to remember and evidently the work of a man of unusual and definite character, but for all that it is painfully smart, and leaves precisely the impression of frivolity that the writings always manage to avoid.

Following the reissue of the Journals, writer Alan Hollinghurst found in Welch's self-portraiture (of which there are several examples; one is in the National Portrait Gallery) a tendency to "amplify the over-riding concern of his writing to fix his youth forever while he accelerates towards death."

== Legacy ==
The playwright and diarist Alan Bennett stated that he shared many similar preoccupations when he first encountered Welch's work.

William S. Burroughs cited Welch as the writer who most influenced his own work and dedicated his 1983 novel The Place of Dead Roads to him. In 1951 the English composer Howard Ferguson set five of Welch's poems (included in A Last Sheaf) as a song-cycle for voice and piano, entitled Discovery. Others who have named Welch as an influence have included the film-maker John Waters, the artist Barbara Hanrahan, and the writers Beryl Bainbridge and Barbara Pym.

Welch appears as "Merton Hughes" in the 1956 novel No Coward Soul, written by his friend, the painter Noël Adeney, and as "Kim Carsons" in William S. Burroughs' The Place of Dead Roads.

Many commentators who wrote about Denton Welch after his death had their views clouded by largely non-aesthetic concerns: by their perception of his sexuality, or of his treatment of them personally in his writing, or of the "hateful winsomeness" of his personality. The appropriateness of Welch's alleged solipsism, at a time when the world was in turmoil, appears as a factor in some reviews; the poet Randall Swingler went so far as to remark on the comparatively commonplace fact of Welch's early death, being, as it was, only one of many at the time. However, Welch's friends observed that close focus on his sexuality was to miss the point of his writing. Fellow student at Goldsmiths, Helen Roeder, called him 'Ariel', and Maurice Cranston highlighted the complexity of Welch's character, at least in part influenced by his health. Simply labelling him "'a homosexual' is to use a bright, pat word which will make foolish people think they have learned the secret of something they have not begun to understand".

Cranston also offered what might be considered a more balanced assessment of Welch's shortcomings and gifts:

He had no trust. This in turn connects with his greatest limitation as an artist. He built too many barricades and enclosed the range of his understanding. If he could have seen the wider human comedy with his miraculously penetrating eye, and described the world as he described his own, he would surely have been among the greater writers in our language. As it is he will survive as a minor genius, one of very few from an uncreative age.

== Works ==
- Maiden Voyage (London: Hamish Hamilton, 1943), ISBN 0-241-02376-9. (Penguin Books, 1954; 1982 (Penguin Travel Library)), ISBN 0-14-009522-5. (Exact Change, 1999), ISBN 1-878972-28-6.
- In Youth is Pleasure (London: Routledge, 1945), (New York: E.P. Dutton, 1985), ISBN 0-525-48161-3.
- Brave and Cruel and Other Stories (London: Hamish Hamilton, 1948). Comprising:
  - "The Coffin on the Hill"
  - "The Barn"
  - "Narcissus Bay"
  - "At Sea"
  - "When I Was Thirteen"
  - "The Judas Tree"
  - "The Trout Stream"
  - "Leaves from a Young Person's Notebook"
  - "Brave and Cruel"
  - "The Fire in the Wood"
- A Voice Through a Cloud (London: J. Lehmann, 1950). (London: Enitharmon Press, 2004), ISBN 1-904634-06-0.
- A Last Sheaf, edited by Eric Oliver (London: John Lehmann, 1951). Comprising:
  - "Sickert at St. Peter's"
  - "The Earth's Crust"
  - "Memories of a Vanished Period"
  - "A Fragment of a Life Story"
  - "A Party"
  - "Evergreen Seaton-Leverett"
  - "A Picture in the Snow"
  - "Ghosts"
  - "The Hateful Word"
  - "The Diamond Badge"
  - Poems
- The Denton Welch Journals, edited by Jocelyn Brooke (London: Hamish Hamilton, 1952, revised 1973). As The Journals of Denton Welch, edited by Michael De-la-Noy (London: Allison & Busby, 1984).
- Dumb Instrument (London: Enitharmon Press, 1976).
- I Left My Grandfather's House (Allison & Busby, 1984; London: Enitharmon Press, 2006), ISBN 1-904634-28-1.
- Fragments Of A Life Story: The Collected Short Writings Of Denton Welch, edited by Michael De-la-Noy (London: Penguin Books, 1987), ISBN 978-0140076202.
  - Collects Brave and Cruel, A Last Sheaf and previously unpublished shorter works.
- A Lunch Appointment (Elysium Press, 1993)
- When I was an Art Student (Elysium Press, 1998)
- Where Nothing Sleeps: The Complete Short Stories and Other Related Works, edited by James Methuen-Campbell (North Yorkshire: Tartarus Press, 2005), ISBN 978-1-872621-94-4.
  - Includes all the material from the above plus some further unpublished pieces and selected extracts from the journals.
