= A Voice Through a Cloud =

Autobiographical novel by Denton Welch

- First edition
- Author: Denton Welch
- Language: English
- Genre: Autobiographical novel
- Publisher: John Lehmann
- Publication date: 1950
- Publication place: United Kingdom
- Media type: Print (Hardback)

A Voice Through a Cloud is an autobiographical novel by Denton Welch, who became a writer after a serious accident which had long-term effects on his health. The book describes his bicycle accident when he was an art student, and subsequent experiences in hospital wards and a nursing home. The book was almost complete when the writer died in December 1948 aged 33.

== Background ==
Denton Welch was anxious to complete the novel when his health, precarious since his accident, was worsening. As described in the foreword: "As late as the summer of 1948, long after most people in his condition would have adopted the life of a permanent invalid, his tremendous will-power enabled him to live normally and even strenuously during the increasingly short intervals between the crises of his illness.... Towards the end he could only work for three or four minutes at a time... Complication after complication set in.... Even then, he made colossal and nearly successful attempts to finish the book." The foreword was by Eric Oliver, with whom the writer shared a house for the last few years of his life, and who was instrumental in the book being published by John Lehmann.

The title reflects the description in the book of the narrator's first conscious impression, when someone is trying to talk to him moments after the accident: "I heard a voice through a great cloud of agony and sickness.... Everything about me seemed to be reeling and breaking up. My whole body was screaming with pain...."

== Summary ==
Riding his bicycle from his lodgings in Crooms Hill in South London to visit his uncle in Surrey on a Whitsun holiday, the narrator, an art student, is hit by a car.

The following chapters contain his careful observations of his hospital ward, the staff, the other patients, and his visitors, and he notes particular things that people say. Sometimes there are memories of episodes in his life before the accident, described in the same way. Mundane details are made interesting by the quality of the prose, in which every feature of his life, and his reaction to it, comes under his calm scrutiny.

More than once, he describes a fellow patient who dies soon after he gets to know him, such as Ray, who had suffered a brain injury: "The futile ending of Ray's life dismayed me. We both had felt the savage change from fair to dark; now he could feel no more, but what was left to me?"

He is moved to another hospital where the specialist can visit him regularly; later his brother arranges his move to a nursing home near an unspecified seaside town in Kent.

At the nursing home, where his doctor is Dr. Farley, he starts to take regular walks, and sometimes takes a bus into town; on one occasion Dr. Farley asks what his plans are for the future.

What was my life? It was all a scraping together of little incidents, a sucking of them dry before I hurried on in search of one more drop of nectar.

The thought of what I should try to do in the world came as a black face looming nearer and nearer....

With such emptiness inside me I turned fiercely to Dr. Farley, until he grew to have the significance of some model person. I would test others by him and find them unbelievably sham and tawdry. Intolerence seemed to grow with wretchedness. I would apply the test to myself with the same destroying result. Everyone was contemptible, except perhaps Dr. Farley.

When he hears that Dr. Farley is leaving the area, he wants to leave as well. After Dr. Farley has left, he travels by train to visit him for the day. His landlady at his lodgings before the accident, Miss Hellier, is also there: she has agreed to be his housekeeper when he finds accommodation. They have tea with Dr. Farley; the incomplete novel ends when Dr. Farley has driven them to a property nearby which the estate agent has suggested.

In the notes Welch left with the unfinished manuscript, there are the following sentences:

I concentrated on the rhythm of my breathing. I felt glad that I should always have this with me till the day I died.

Welch's biographer, James Methuen-Campbell, suggests that this may have been how Welch intended to finish the novel.

== Critical response ==
Despite the book being published incomplete, responses to it were almost universally positive, ironically the most positive set of notices Welch ever received.

Writing in The Guardian, Elizabeth Jenkins called Welch's "capacity for description... astounding, [his] angle of vision unusual... his felicity inexhaustible... The book is a unique achievement." An unnamed reviewer in Punch called it "[t]he best of his books... with the curious vitality of a minor classic." The editor of Readers News, the newsletter of the Readers Union bookclub, exhorted members to read the book, the work of "a promising talent, even perhaps genius... with extra care." Writing in The Daily Herald, John Betjeman was less equivocal. He simply entitled his review "Here's a work of genius."

== References and Notes ==
- De-la-Noy, Michael (1984) Denton Welch: The Making of a Writer, Harmondsworth: Viking ISBN 0670800562
- Methuen-Campbell, James (2002) Denton Welch: Writer and Artist, Carlton-in-Coverdale: Tartarus Press ISBN 1872621600
- Phillips, Robert S. (1974) Denton Welch, New York: Twayne, ISBN 0805715673
- Welch, Denton (1951) A Voice Through a Cloud, London: John Lehmann
