= David Madden (novelist) =

American novelist (born 1933)

- Born: Jerry David Madden; July 25, 1933; Knoxville, Tennessee, U.S.
- Education: University of Tennessee (BA); San Francisco State (MA); Yale University (MFA)
- Spouse: Roberta Margaret Young

David Madden (born July 25, 1933) is an American writer of many novels, short stories, poems, plays, and works of nonfiction and literary criticism.

== Biography ==
Madden was born in Knoxville, Tennessee, to James Helvy and Emile Merritt Madden. He was named after David Madden, president of the East Tennessee Packing Co., where many of Madden's family worked. At the age of 16, he was a radio announcer for WKGN in Knoxville. His first success was winning second place in a statewide one-act play competition with “Call Herman in to Supper” when he was 16. He graduated from Knox High School in 1951.

Madden enrolled at the University of Tennessee in 1951. In 1952, he became a seaman in the Merchant Marine. Following his discharge from the army in 1955, he returned to the University of Tennessee and graduated in 1957 with a B.S. in education; he earned an M.A. in creative writing from San Francisco State University in 1958, and received a John Golden fellowship to attend Yale School of Drama from 1959 to 1960.

== Writing ==
=== Fiction ===
Cassandra Singing, originally written in 1954 as a one-act play, rewritten in various forms over fifteen years and published in 1969 as his second novel, is about the conflicts between Lone, a motorcycle gang leader who lives a life of the imagination and his invalid sister Cassie, who lives a life of the imagination in Harlan in Eastern Kentucky.

His first novel, The Beautiful Greed, published in 1961, is based on a trip to Panama and Chile as a merchant seaman.

Bijou (1974) is set in a movie theater in Knoxville where Madden was an usher in 1946. Novelist Stephen King described it as “one of the books I admire most in the world.” The protagonist is Lucius Hutchfield, a movie lover and aspiring writer, who is also the main character in Pleasure-Dome (1979), in which he fails to get his little brother off the Georgia chain gang, then moves on to Blowing Rock where he bribes an old lady in a deserted resort hotel to tell him the story of her brief love affair with Jesse James.

On the Big Wind (1980) is a novel composed of previously published stories about Big Bob Travis who moves from a radio station in Boone to become a network newscaster.

Sharpshooter: A Novel of the Civil War (1996), places one of Madden's foremost interests into novel form. It is the fictional memoir of Willis Carr who avoids death by switching to the Confederates during the Civil War.

In The Suicide’s Wife (1978), Madden traces the progress of a very ordinary woman to self-hood as she struggles to understand her husband's suicide and her own vacuous life. A television movie adaptation starring Angie Dickinson aired in 1979.

His novel Abducted by Circumstance (2010) is set in northern New York and is about what happens to an abductee, Glenda, as imagined by Carol Seaborg, who witnesses the abduction.

Madden's latest novel, London Bridge in Plague and Fire (2012), is a “meditative narrative” with London Bridge serving as the focal-point of twenty-six characters.

Madden's two short-story collections are The Shadow Knows (1970) and The New Orleans of Possibilities (1982); forthcoming in 2014 is a third volume The Last Bizarre Tale.

=== Poetry ===
Madden has published numerous poems in Cimarron Review, Film Quarterly, The Georgia Review, The International Portland Review, Kansas Quarterly, Kentucky Poetry Review, National Forum, New American Review, Northwest Review, Poem, Southern Poetry Review, Wormwood Review, and many others.

=== Literary criticism ===
Madden has compiled and edited numerous textbook collections of stories and is the author of academic volumes on Wright Morris, James M. Cain, James Agee, Nathaniel West, Robert Penn Warren, and William Faulkner. He also authored The Poetic Image in 6 Genres (1969), Harlequin’s Stick, Charlie’s Cane: A Comparative Study of Commedia dell’arte and Silent Slapstick Comedy (1975), A Primer of the Novel (1980), Writers’ Revisions (1981), Revising Fiction: A Handbook for Writers (1988), Beyond the Battlefield (2000), Touching the Web of Southern Novelists (2006), and The Tangled Web of the Civil War and Reconstruction (forthcoming in 2015). He compiled and edited Rediscoveries (1971), American Dreams, American Nightmares (1972), Proletarian Writers of the Thirties (1979), Tough Guy Writers of the Thirties (1979), and Rediscoveries II (1988).

=== Awards ===
- Rockefeller Grant, 1969
- National Endowment for the Arts prize, 1970
- Bread Loaf Writers Conference William Raney fellowship, 1972
- National Council on the Arts Award (The Shadow Knows)
- Pulitzer Prize nomination, The Suicide's Wife, 1979

== Works about ==
A collection of essays by various critics and novelists about his life and work is called David Madden: A Writer for All Genres, edited by Randy J. Hendricks and James A. Perkins (2006). This volume includes a bibliography of critical writing on Madden.

== Teaching ==
Madden began his teaching career in 1958 as an instructor in English at Appalachian State Teachers College in Boone, North Carolina. He spent time teaching at Centre College in Danville, Kentucky (1960–1962), the University of Louisville in Kentucky (1962–1964), Kenyon College in Gambier, Ohio, where he was also the assistant editor of Kenyon Review (1964–1966), and Ohio University in Athens, Ohio (1966–1968). In 1968, he joined the faculty of Louisiana State University in Baton Rouge, Louisiana as the university's writer in residence, a position he held for 24 years. At LSU, he founded the Creative Writing Program and the United States Civil War Center. From 1992 to 1994, he was the director of LSU's Creative Writing Program. He retired in 2008 as Robert Penn Warren Professor of Creative Writing, emeritus.

== Personal ==
Madden's archive is held at the University of Tennessee Special Collections Library in Knoxville. Madden married Roberta Margaret Young in 1956 after they met at the Iowa State Teacher's College radio station. They have one son, Blake, and currently live in Black Mountain, North Carolina.
