= Double indemnity (disambiguation) =

Double indemnity is a clause or provision in a life insurance or accident policy.

Double indemnity may also refer to:

- Double Indemnity (novel), a 1943 crime novel by James M. Cain.
  - Double Indemnity, a 1944 American film noir adaptation of Cain's novel, directed by Billy Wilder.
  - Double Indemnity (1973 film), a 1973 TV film remake of the 1944 film, directed by Jack Smight
- "Double Indemnity", a short story by science fiction writer Robert Sheckley
