= Phyllis Dietrichson =

Character in Double Indemnity

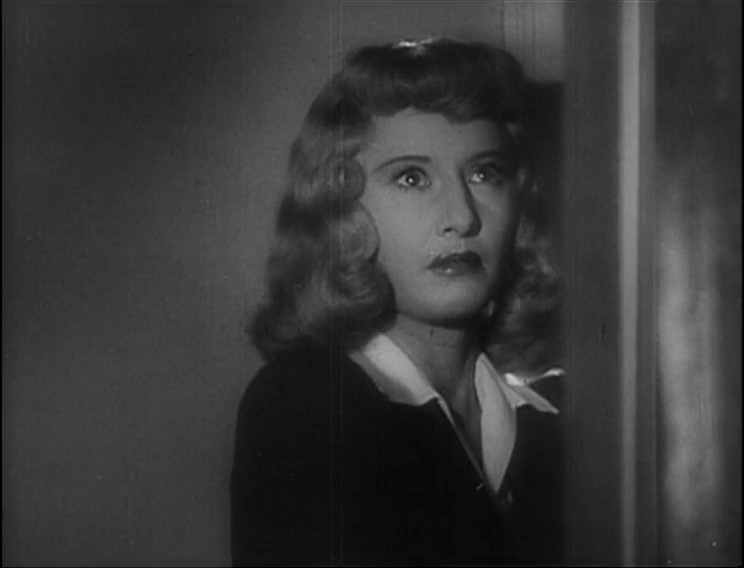
Stanwyck as Phyllis in the 1944 film Double Indemnity.

Phyllis Dietrichson (Phyllis Nirdlinger in the book) is a fictional character in James M. Cain's novella Double Indemnity and derivate works, including two film adaptations. For her portrayal of the character in the 1944 film of the same name, Barbara Stanwyck was nominated for the Academy Award for Best Actress. The character is considered one of the best femme fatale roles in film noir history, and was ranked as the #8 film villain of the first 100 years of American cinema by the American Film Institute in the AFI's 100 Years... 100 Heroes and Villains.

== Character biography ==
In both the novella and films, she meets her husband's insurance agent, Walter Neff (Fred MacMurray) to help her murder her husband. They first trick her husband, Mr. Dietrichson, into signing a life insurance policy without his knowledge. The policy has a double indemnity clause whereby the company agrees to pay double the face amount in the contract in cases of accidental death. They later murder her husband and try to make it seem like an accident on a train in an attempt to invoke the policy's double indemnity clause. Although they succeed, Phyllis soon runs into problems in trying to invoke the clause and collect the money.

The next day, much to her dismay, Phyllis finds out that the company has refused to pay the double indemnity clause for they did not know about Mr. Dietrichson's broken leg before his death. Their suspicions catch the attention of Neff's boss, Barton Keyes, who encourages them to investigate, making both her and Neff nervous. Phyllis realizes too late that Dietrichson eventually found out about her plan to murder him and changed his will to spite her. He left the inheritance to his daughter (her stepdaughter), Lola and thus leaving her with nothing. Phyllis knows her stepdaughter is a threat to her because Lola suspects her of murdering her father in a similar manner to her mother, and tries to get Neff to kill Lola (which fails after he befriends Lola and learns more about her family's tragic past). Phyllis must also contend with the inquisitive Keyes, who suspects she was involved in the murder of Mr. Dietrichson; he believes her accomplice was Nino, whom she was secretly meeting. She tries to kill Neff to clean up any loose ends, but can't fire the last shot because she has fallen in love with him. Neff does not believe Phyllis, calling her a rotten, manipulative woman, and shoots her dead in the ensuing struggle. After killing her, Neff meets Nino outside and convinces him not to go inside the house, but to the woman who truly loves him.

After doing so, a wounded Neff returns to his place of work and confesses to his wrongdoing in his office, via Dictaphone. Keyes comes in and overhears his confession that he murdered both Mr. Dietrichson and Phyllis. He informs Neff that the police are coming over to arrest him for the murders. As he tries to escape, planning to live out his life in Mexico rather than face the death penalty, Neff collapses to the floor near the elevator. Keyes offers him a cigarette, as they wait for the police to arrest Neff for killing the couple.

== Casting ==
Phyllis was so iniquitous that Stanwyck, Billy Wilder's first choice for the role in the 1944 film, was reluctant to take it. Wilder was persistent, however, and Stanwyck eventually relented; she said thereafter it was one of the best roles she had ever played.

== Novel vs film ==
In James M. Cain's original novella, the character is named Phyllis Nirdlinger (Wilder changed the name for the film adaptation, as he thought it sounded too comical). In the novella, Phyllis is a former nurse who was suspected of killing several children in her care; the case was dropped for lack of evidence. Also, in the novel's climax, she escapes with Neff (here called Huff) and goes away with him on an ocean liner; there, she kills him, too. It is implied at the end of the novel she will be arrested.

== Inspiration ==
The character was based upon real-life murderer Ruth Snyder. The photo of Snyder's execution in the Sing Sing electric chair, run on the cover of the January 13, 1928 New York Daily News with the one-word headline DEAD!, has been called the most famous newsphoto of the 1920s.

== Legacy ==
In 2005 Dietrichson was ranked the #8 film villain of the first 100 years of American cinema by the American Film Institute, and can be found on other such lists of evil characters. Richard Corliss, the former editor-in-chief of Film Comment and a notable film critic for Time magazine, ranked Stanwyck's portrayal of Phyllis #5 on his 2007 list of the "Top 25 Greatest Villains" in cinema history, placing her just ahead of Ann Savage's character Vera in Detour (1945). Corliss wrote:

When Walter Neff (Fred MacMurray), a bright insurance peddler, meets Phyllis, can't he see that she plans to use his sexual avidity to get him to kill her cranky, unloving husband and then take the rap for the crime? Can’t he sniff out the sulfur under her perfume? Of course not, because the type hardly existed in Hollywood films before...Phyllis found her perfect embodiment in Stanwyck, maybe the movies' all-time smartest actress (street-smart, anyway). This killer doesn't kid herself; she knows what she is. At the end, just before plugging her accomplice in the chest, she confesses, "I never loved you, Walter, you or anybody else. I'm rotten to the heart." Rotten, ripe and irresistible.

== In other works ==
Samantha Eggar portrayed Dietrichson in a 1973 made-for-television remake. Mischa Barton is set to portray her in a theatrical adaptation of the novel due to premiere in the UK and Ireland in early 2026.
