= Samantha Eggar =

British actress (1939–2025)

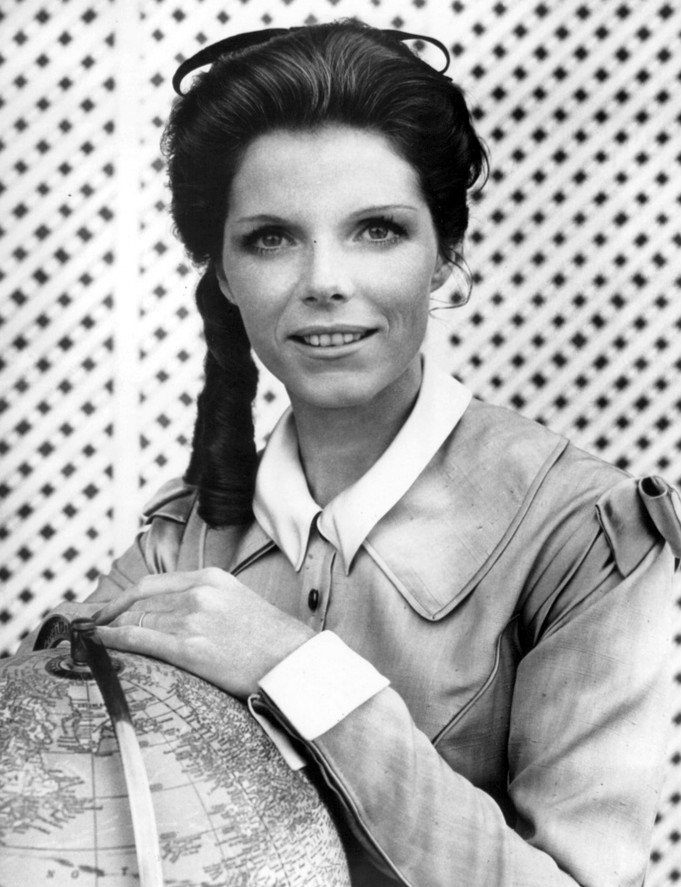
- Eggar in Anna and the King (1972)
- Born: Victoria Louise Samantha Marie Elizabeth Therese Eggar; 5 March 1939; London, England
- Died: 15 October 2025 (aged 86); Los Angeles, California, U.S.
- Citizenship: United Kingdom; United States (from after 1973)
- Occupation: Actress
- Years active: 1959–2012
- Spouse: Tom Stern (m. 1964; div. 1971)
- Children: Nicolas Stern; Jenna Stern
- Awards: See below

Victoria Louise Samantha Marie Elizabeth Therese Eggar (5 March 1939 – 15 October 2025) was an English actress. After beginning her career in Shakespearean theatre she rose to fame for her performance in William Wyler's thriller The Collector (1965), which earned her a Golden Globe Award, a Cannes Film Festival Award, a Sant Jordi Award and an Academy Award nomination for Best Actress.

Eggar later appeared as Emma Fairfax in Doctor Dolittle (1967) and the American drama The Molly Maguires (1970). In the early 1970s Eggar moved to the United States and Canada, where she later starred in several horror films, including The Dead Are Alive (1972), The Uncanny (1977) and David Cronenberg's cult thriller The Brood (1979).

Eggar also worked as a voice actress, as Hera in Disney's Hercules (1997) and in several video games, including Gabriel Knight 3: Blood of the Sacred, Blood of the Damned (1999) and as M in James Bond 007: Nightfire (2002). Her television work included roles on Fantasy Island and a recurring part as Charlotte Devane in the soap opera All My Children in 2000.

== Early life ==
Samantha Eggar was born Victoria Louise Samantha Marie Elizabeth Therese Eggar on 5 March 1939, in Hampstead, London, to Ralph Alfred James Eggar, a brigadier in the British Army, and Muriel Olga Palache-Boumam, who was of Dutch and Portuguese descent. Eggar also had Irish ancestry through her grandmother. Soon after her birth, her family moved to rural Bledlow, Buckinghamshire, during World War II, where she spent her childhood.

Eggar was brought up as a Roman Catholic and educated at St Mary's Providence Convent in Woking, Surrey. Reflecting on her time at convent school, Eggar said: "The nuns didn't have too much success with me — I've always had a violent temper. In fact, once I almost killed one of the nuns." At age 16 she began to go by the name Samantha. Although Eggar expressed interest in acting at a young age, she was urged against a career in the theatre by her parents. She was offered a scholarship to the Royal Academy of Dramatic Art, but instead studied fashion for two years at the Thanet School of Art. After completing her studies she enrolled at the Webber Douglas Academy of Dramatic Art in London.

== Career ==
=== Theatre and early work ===
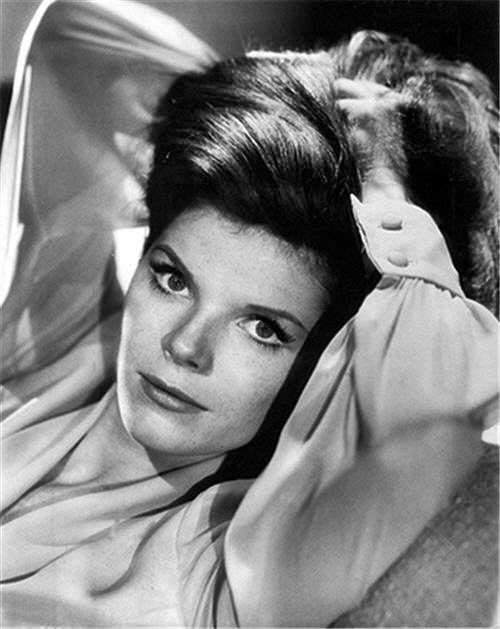
Eggar in 1964

Eggar began her acting career in several Shakespearean companies, notably playing Titania in a 1962 production of A Midsummer Night's Dream directed by Tony Richardson. She also appeared on stage in a production of Douglas Seale's Landscape with Figures, where she was noticed by a talent scout. From there she was cast in the biographical film Dr. Crippen (1962) opposite Donald Pleasence. Her second film role was in 1962 in The Wild and the Willing; in the same year she appeared on stage again as Olivia in a production of Twelfth Night by George Devine.

"It was physically exhausting, and mentally exhausting because of the way Wyler works. Oh, it's all done now and finished."

— Eggar on her time filming The Collector (1965)

In 1963, Eggar played the lead role of Claire Avery in "Marcia", a second-season episode of The Saint. After her appearance in The Saint, Eggar did not make a guest appearance on television for 10 years. In 1965, Eggar appeared in the thriller The Collector, directed by William Wyler, playing a kidnap victim. Of her time working on the set of the film "Ms. Eggar told The Daily Mirror in 1965 that working on the set ... was 'the hardest three months of my life;" she noted that during the shoot she lost about 14 pounds. She received a nomination for the Academy Award for Best Actress and won a Golden Globe award for her performance. She was also awarded Best Actress at the Cannes Film Festival in 1966.

"My biggest relationship on set was with William Wyler. The tension on set was real. And if the tension wasn't there – if I didn't exude precisely what he wanted – well, Willi just poured cold water over me."

— Eggar on her role as Miranda in The Collector (2014)

The following year Eggar starred in the comedy Walk, Don't Run (1966) with Cary Grant (his last motion picture) and Jim Hutton, followed by a lead role as Emma Fairfax in Richard Fleischer's musical adaptation of Doctor Dolittle (1967). She was linked with roles in Guess Who's Coming to Dinner? and Goodbye Mr Chips but did not appear in either. She also appeared in The Walking Stick, a psychological thriller by Eric Till where she costarred with David Hemmings, The Molly Maguires (1970), a social drama directed by Martin Ritt in which she starred with Sean Connery and Richard Harris, and The Light at the Edge of the World (1971), an adventure movie from a novel by Jules Verne in which she shared the screen with Kirk Douglas and Yul Brynner.

Eggar also played the main character in The Lady in the Car with Glasses and a Gun (1970), a thriller based on a book by French novelist Sébastien Japrisot and the last film directed by Anatole Litvak. She then went to Italy to shoot The Dead Are Alive (1972), a giallo directed by Armando Crispino. Although Eggar co-starred with Yul Brynner in the television series Anna and the King (1972), she did not make another television guest appearance until 1973, when she starred in an episode of the romantic anthology series Love Story. That same year she played Phyllis Dietrichson in a TV remake of the 1944 film Double Indemnity.

=== Move to United States ===
In 1973, Eggar moved to the United States, settling in Los Angeles, and appeared first in television, guest-starring in episodes of Starsky & Hutch, Hart to Hart and Columbo. She would go on to star in a number of horror films, including A Name for Evil (1973) and Demonoid (1981).

During this period, Eggar also appeared in two British-Canadian co-productions, Welcome to Blood City, an early "virtual-reality" thriller directed by Peter Sasdy in which she plays opposite Jack Palance and Keir Dullea, and The Uncanny, a horror movie directed by Denis Héroux.

Eggar was also in the Canadian movie Why Shoot the Teacher?, a dramatic comedy filmed in Alberta by Silvio Narizzano that went on to be the most successful Canadian movie that year. In 1979 she appeared in David Cronenberg's cult sci-fi film The Brood (1979). In 1980, she filmed the Canadian slasher film Curtains, released in 1983.

She also appeared as Maggie Gioberti in "The Vintage Years", the pilot for the drama Falcon Crest, but was replaced by Susan Sullivan when the series went into production. She appeared twice on The Love Boat, in 1979 and 1981. She appeared in the drama Dark Horse (1992), followed by the superhero film The Phantom (1996). In 1997, she provided the voice of Hera in Disney's animated film Hercules; she also supplied the voice for the subsequent television series. Eggar also had a role in the sci-fi thriller The Astronaut's Wife (1999), which starred Johnny Depp.

Eggar appeared as the wife of Captain Jean-Luc Picard's brother Robert on the television series Star Trek: The Next Generation, and as Sarah Templeton, the wife of Speaker of the House Nathan Templeton (Donald Sutherland), on the short-lived television series Commander in Chief, which starred Geena Davis. In the year 2000, she had a brief run as Charlotte Devane in the American soap opera All My Children. In 2002, she provided the voice of M in the video game James Bond 007: Nightfire. In 2004, she appeared in the first season of Cold Case, episode 14 ("The Boy in the Box") as Sister Vivian. In 2009, she played the mother of Jack and Becky Gallagher in season 1, episode 11 ("Lines in the Sand") of the Fox television series Mental.

== Personal life ==
In 1964, she married actor Tom Stern and the couple had two children: film producer Nicolas Stern and actress Jenna Stern. Eggar and Stern divorced in 1971.

In the early 1970s, Eggar had an affair with her The Walking Stick co-star David Hemmings.

Eggar held dual British and American citizenship, obtaining the latter in 1973.

=== Death ===
Eggar resided in Los Angeles, where she died at her home in Sherman Oaks, on 15 October 2025 from chronic lymphocytic leukemia (CLL), at the age of 86. According to her daughter, Eggar had been diagnosed with this illness 22 years earlier.

== Filmography ==
=== Film ===
Year	Title	Role	Director(s)	Notes	Ref.
1962	The Wild and the Willing	Josie	Ralph Thomas	Also known as Young and Willing	
1962	Dr. Crippen	Ethel Le Neve	Robert Lynn		
1963	Doctor in Distress	Delia Mallory	Ralph Thomas		
1964	Psyche 59	Robin	Alexander Singer		
1965	Return from the Ashes	Fabienne 'Fabi' Wolf	J. Lee Thompson		
1965	The Collector	Miranda Grey	William Wyler		
1966	Walk, Don't Run	Christine Easton	Charles Walters		
1967	Doctor Dolittle	Emma Fairfax	Richard Fleischer		
1970	The Molly Maguires	Miss Mary Raines	Martin Ritt		
1970	The Walking Stick	Deborah Dainton	Eric Till		
1970	The Lady in the Car with Glasses and a Gun	Danielle "Dany" Lang	Anatole Litvak		
1971	The Light at the Edge of the World	Arabella	Kevin Billington		
1972	The Dead Are Alive	Myra Shelton	Armando Crispino		
1973	A Name for Evil	Joanna Blake	Bernard Girard		
1976	The Seven-Per-Cent Solution	Mary Morstan Watson	Herbert Ross		
1977	The Uncanny	Edina Hamilton	Denis Héroux	Segment: "Hollywood 1936"	
1977	Welcome to Blood City	Katherine	Peter Sasdy		
1977	Why Shoot the Teacher?	Alice Field	Silvio Narizzano		
1978	The Greatest Battle	Annelise Ackermann	Umberto Lenzi	Italian: Il grande attacco, lit. 'The Great Attack'	
1979	The Brood	Nola Carveth	David Cronenberg		
1980	The Exterminator	Dr. Megan Stewart	James Glickenhaus		
1981	The Hot Touch	Samantha O'Brien	Roger Vadim		
1981	Demonoid	Jennifer Baines	Alfredo Zacarías	Spanish: Macabra: La mano del diablo, lit. 'Macabra: The Hand of the Devil'	
1983	Curtains	Samantha Sherwood	Richard Ciupka; Peter R. Simpson		
1990	Ragin' Cajun	Dr. May	William Byron Hillman		
1992	Dark Horse	Mrs. Curtis	David Hemmings		
1992	Round Numbers	Anne	Nancy Zala		
1993	The Magic Voyage	Isabella I of Castile (voice)	Michael Schoemann		
1994	Inevitable Grace	Britt	Alex Monty Canawati		
1996	The Phantom	Lily Palmer	Simon Wincer		
1997	Hercules	Hera (voice)	John Musker; Ron Clements		
1999	The Astronaut's Wife	Dr. Patraba	Rand Ravich		

=== Television ===
Year	Title	Role	Notes	Ref.
1961	Rob Roy	Diana Vernon	Recurring	
1961	Rendezvous	Joan	Episode: "The Road Between"	
1962	Sunday Night Theatre	Virginia Otis	Episode: "The Canterville Ghost"	
1963	ITV Television Playhouse	Lily	Episode: "Along Came a Spider"	
1963	Play of the Week	Manderin	Episode: "The Touch of a Dead Hand"	
1963	Ghost Squad	Mina	Episode: "Hot Money"	
1963	The Saint	Claire Avery	Episode: "Marcia"	
1962	BBC Sunday-Night Play	Virginia Otis	Episode: "The Canterville Ghost"	
1972	Anna and the King	Anna Leonowens	Main cast	
1973	Love Story	Ruth Wilson	Episode: "The Cardboard House"	
1975	Lucas Tanner	Angela Bowman	Episode: "Shattered"	
1976	Baretta	Laurie Eckardt	Episode: "Look Back in Terror"	
1977	Columbo	Vivian Brandt	Episode: "The Bye-Bye Sky High IQ Murder Case"	
1977	Starsky and Hutch	Charlotte	Episode: "Starsky and Hutch on Playboy Island"	
1977	Family	Norah McKay	Episode: "Labours of Love"	
1978	Hawaii Five-O	Agnes DuBois	Episode: "Horoscope for Murder"	
1978	Fantasy Island	Helena Marsh	Episode: "Return/The Toughest Man Alive"	
1979–81	The Love Boat	Mary-Louise Murphy; Meg Chase	Episodes: "A Funny Valentine"; "Touchdown Twins"	
1979	Fantasy Island	Helena Marsh	Episode: "The Wedding"	
1980	Hagen	Livia	Episode: "Pilot"	
1981	Aloha Paradise	Guest	Episode: "The Kid Who Would Be a Daddy / Make Me a Match / Treasure Hunt"	
1981	Falcon Crest	Maggie Gioberti	Episode: "The Vintage Years"	
1982	Darkroom	Miss Alexis St. Clair	Episode: "Exit Lane"	
1983	Hart to Hart	Gillian Rawlings	Episode: "Long Lost Love"	
1984	Murder, She Wrote	Marta Quintessa	Episode "Hooray for Homicide"	
1984	Magnum, P.I.	Laura Bennett	Episode "Fragments"	
1985	Finder of Lost Loves	Megan Brody	Episode: "Wayward Dreams"	
1985	Tales of the Unexpected	Gwen Carter	Episode "People Don't Do Such Things"	
1985	George Burns Half-Hour Comedy Hour	Mrs. Cratchet	Episode: "Christmas Carol II: The Sequel"	
1985	Hotel	Elizabeth Oliver	Episode: "Cry Wolf"	
1987	Outlaws	Sister Rachel	Episode: "Hymm"	
1987	Stingray	Camila	Episode "Echos"	
1987	Alfred Hitchcock Presents	Lisa Talbot	Episode: "Deathmate"	
1990	Star Trek: The Next Generation	Marie Picard	Episode "Family"	
1991–93	The Legend of Prince Valiant	Queen Guinevere (voice)	Recurring role	
1993	L.A. Law	Camille Bancroft	Episode "Where There's a Will"	
1998–99	Hercules	Hera (voice)	7 episodes	
2000	All My Children	Charlotte Devane	20 episodes	
2003	She Spies	Huffy English Woman	Episode: "Learning to Fly"	
2005	Commander in Chief	Sara Templeton	Recurring role	
2009	Mental	Margo Stroud	2 episodes	
2011	The Nine Lives of Chloe King	Olivia Rezza	Episode: "Beautiful Day"	
2012	Metalocalypse	Whale (voice)	2 episodes	

==== TV films, miniseries, and specials ====
Year	Title	Role	Director(s)	Notes	Ref.
1961	The Princess and the Pea	The Real Princess	John Newland		
1973	Double Indemnity	Phyllis Dietrichson	Jack Smight		
1973	The Man of Destiny	The Strange Lady	Joseph Hardy		
1974	All the Kind Strangers	Carol Ann	Burt Kennedy	Also known as Evil in the Swamp	
1975	The Legendary Curse of the Hope Diamond	Evalyn Walsh McLean	Delbert Mann		
1976	The Hemingway Play	Glynis	Don Taylor		
1976	The Killer Who Wouldn't Die	Anne Roland	William Hale		
1978	Ziegfeld: The Man and His Women	Billie Burke	Buzz Kulik		
1983	For the Term of his Natural Life	Julie Vickers	Rob Stewart		
1987	Love Among Thieves	Solange	Roger Young		
1990	A Ghost in Monte Carlo	Jeanne	John Hough		
1996	Everything to Gain	Diana Keswick	Michael Miller		
1998	Loss of Faith	Insp. Strong	Allan A. Goldstein		

=== Video games ===
Year	Title	Role	Notes
1997	Hercules	Hera (voice)	
1999	Gabriel Knight 3: Blood of the Sacred, Blood of the Damned	Lady Howard (voice)	
2002	James Bond 007: Nightfire	M (voice)	
2003	James Bond 007: Everything or Nothing	Additional voices	

== Stage credits ==
Year	Title	Role	Director	Venue	Ref.
1959	Landscape with Figures		Douglas Seale	Olympia Theatre, Dublin	
1959	Landscape with Figures		Douglas Seale	Theatre Royal, Brighton	
1959	Landscape with Figures		Douglas Seale	Grand Theatre, Wolverhampton	
1962	A Midsummer Night's Dream	Titania	Tony Richardson	Royal Court Theatre, London	
1962	Twelfth Night	Olivia	George Devine	Royal Court Theatre, London	
1985	The Lonely Road	Irene Herms	Christopher Fettes	Yvonne Arnaud Theatre, Guildford	
1985	The Lonely Road	Irene Herms	Christopher Fettes	Old Vic Theatre, London	
1985	The Seagull	Irina Nikolayevna Arkadina	Charles Sturridge	Oxford Playhouse, Oxford	
1985	The Seagull	Irina Nikolayevna Arkadina	Charles Sturridge	Theatre Royal, Bath	
1992	Auntie Mame	Vera	Karin Baker	Candlewood Playhouse, New Fairfield	

== Awards and nominations ==
Institution	Year	Category	Work	Result	Ref.
Academy Awards	1966	Best Actress	The Collector	Nominated	
Cannes Film Festival	1965	Best Actress	The Collector	Won	
Genie Awards	1980	Best Performance by a Foreign Actress	The Brood	Nominated	
Golden Globe Awards	1966	Best Actress in a Motion Picture – Drama	The Collector	Won	
Photoplay Award	1965	Favorite Female Newcomer	The Collector	Nominated	
Laurel Awards	1965	New Faces, Female	The Collector	Nominated	
Laurel Awards	1966	Dramatic Performance, Female	The Collector	Nominated	
Laurel Awards	1966	Female Star	The Collector	Nominated	
Sant Jordi Awards	1966	Best Performance in a Foreign Film	The Collector	Won	
