= List of Starsky & Hutch episodes =

This is a list of episodes from the original American television series Starsky & Hutch, which aired for four seasons from 1975 to 1979. The fictional duo of Detective Dave Starsky (played by Paul Michael Glaser) and Detective Ken Hutchinson (played by David Soul) were introduced in a 90-minute made-for-television movie, originally broadcast on April 30, 1975.

Not including the pilot, there were 22 episodes in the first season; 25 episodes in the second; and 23 in the third season. The fourth and final season had 22 episodes.

== Series overview ==
Season	Episodes	Originally released	
Season	Episodes	First released	Last released
1	22	September 10, 1975	April 21, 1976
2	25	September 25, 1976	April 16, 1977
3	23	September 17, 1977	May 17, 1978
4	22	September 12, 1978	May 15, 1979

== Episodes ==
=== Pilot movie ===
Title	Directed by	Written by	Original release date
"Pilot"	Barry Shear	William Blinn	April 30, 1975
In Bay City, California, there is a shooting in which two teenage lovers are killed. District Attorney Mark Henderson (Albert Morgenstern) thinks the intended targets were Detectives David Michael "Dave" Starsky (Paul Michael Glaser) and Kenneth "Hutch" Hutchinson (David Soul), because the car the victims were shot in is identical to Starksy's red and white Ford Gran Torino. Starsky and Hutch are told by local criminal Fat Rolly (Michael Lerner) that there's a contract out on Starsky. All indications point to Frank Tallman (Gilbert Green), a local crime lord awaiting trial, where Starsky and Hutch are the main prosecution witnesses. But Tallman denies it, claiming someone is trying to frame him. With the help of their regular informant, Huggy Bear, Starsky and Hutch track down the hitmen, a pair of professionals named Zane (Richard Lynch, in his first of three appearances) and Cannell (Michael Conrad), only to learn that one of the actual victims, 19-year-old Patricia Talbot (Karen Lamm), was indeed the intended target. Starsky and Hutch begin to suspect that Zane and Cannell were hired by someone inside the police department. Note: The pilot features Richard Ward playing Captain Dobey.

=== Season 1 (1975–76) ===
No. overall	No. in season	Title	Directed by	Written by	Original release date
1	1	"Savage Sunday"	Jack Starrett	Fred Freiberger	September 10, 1975
Henny Wilson (Arthur Peterson) and his wife Sarah (Hope Summers), an elderly couple, are desperate to expose the appalling living conditions of their convalescence home, the Eastside Home For The Aged. Despite spending two years complaining to the city council, their argument falls on deaf ears. The furious couple rig their car with a time-bomb, using fifty dynamite sticks and a timer, planning to explode at City Hall at 5:00 pm, in retaliation for the city council's incompetence and refusal to fix the poor living conditions at their home. However, after stopping at the local diner, the car is stolen by Wilbur Sloane (Edward Walsh) and Gregg Morton (Bob Delegall), two armed robbers, who are unaware that the car is loaded with dynamite. Detectives Starsky and Hutch hunt down for Sloane and Morton, with the 5:00 pm deadline when the bomb is set to explode. While Starsky and Hutch track Sloane and Morton, they learn Sloane is a gambling addict, who resorts to robbery when he owes money to the bookies, who threaten to kill him if he does not pay. Note: Bernie Hamilton assumes the role of Captain Dobey for the series, replacing Richard Ward who portrayed him in the pilot. Future Three's Company actress, Suzanne Somers, guest stars here in one of her three guest appearances on the show. Title card reads "Starsky and Hutch" -- from episode 2 onwards it will read "Starsky & Hutch".
2	2	"Texas Longhorn"	Jack Starrett	Michael Mann	September 17, 1975
At 5am one morning, wealthy used-car dealer Zack Tyler (Med Flory) and his wife Emma Lou (Alta Christopher) stop to help two men, John Brown Harris (Charles Napier) and Little Huey Chaco (George Loros), who are having car trouble, only for them to rob the couple, with Harris raping and fatally strangling Emma Lou. Starsky and Hutch are assigned to the case, going all-out, using their underground contacts to track down Harris and Chaco, learning that they are heroin addicts. But the two detectives don't realize that once they've found Harris and Chaco, an understandably enraged Zack plans to take his own revenge on the felons. Note: This is Michael Lerner's last appearance on the show as Fat Rollie.
3	3	"Death Ride"	Gene Nelson	Edward J. Lakso	September 25, 1975
Starsky and Hutch are safeguarding Andrew Mello (Jeff Corey), a big-time crime boss who has agreed to testify before a Senate sub-committee against leading underworld figures. But the party is ambushed, and Mello is shot and hospitalized. Everyone knows that a gangster named Kester ordered the hit, and Starsky and Hutch believe Kester has bought someone inside the police department to feed him information about the witness protection operation. Mello now refuses to testify unless his daughter, Joanne Wells (Kathleen Miller), is brought safely to him. The problem is that she lives in San Francisco. At the request of District Attorney Coleman (Paul Hecht), Starsky and Hutch are assigned to bring Joanne to Bay City. The trip is a dangerous one, with hit-men after them to ensure that both the detectives and the girl never make it alive, and that the trial never goes ahead.
4	4	"Snowstorm"	Bob Kelljan	Robert I. Holt	October 1, 1975
Starsky and Hutch, along with three highly experienced detectives -- Kalowitz (Bill Sorrells), Burke (Paul Benjamin), and Corman (Richard Venture) -- are involved in a large-scale drug bust, where pure cocaine with a street value of $4,000,000 is seized. Following the successful raid, Starsky and Hutch come under suspicion when $1,000,000 worth of the cocaine mysteriously disappears. Captain Dobey gives them 48 hours to clear their names and those of Kalowitz, Burke, and Corman, who they assume to be innocent, and nail Stryker (Gilbert Green), the drug kingpin behind everything. Captain Dobey REALLY wants to nail him because Stryker was the killer of Captain Dobey's best friend and former partner Elmo Jackson years ago -- his body found hung on a hook in a meat factory. Now, Starsky and Hutch's informant, Marty Crandell (George Dzundza), is found dead, and throughout the case, Hutch keeps spotting a Dalmatian that seems to appear whenever danger lurks nearby. Note: George Dzundza appears in this episode as Crandell.
5	5	"The Fix"	William Crain	Robert I. Holt	October 8, 1975
Hutch is dating Jeanie Waldon (Leigh Christian), who was formerly associated with big-time crime boss Ben Forest (Robert Loggia). He is then abducted by the jealous Ben, who gets him addicted to heroin to get him to confess to where Jeanie is located, which he does in his drug-induced stupor. Hutch escapes from the mobsters and is found by Starsky, noticing the needle marks on Hutch's arm. He and Huggy Bear secretly nurse Hutch back to health from the terrible withdrawal symptoms of the addictive substance. Ben, now furious that Hutch escaped, tells his right-hand man, Allen "Monk" Philos (Geoffrey Lewis), to make sure he is killed. Hutch tells Starsky that the henchmen who abducted him wanted to escape with Jeanie in tow. Starsky heads out to find the mobsters, and the determined Hutch heads out a short time later to do the same thing, despite his slow recovery from the heroin earlier. Note: Originally banned by the BBC, the episode "The Fix" was first shown on British television on 31 May 1999 on Channel 4 as part of a Starsky & Hutch theme night. Edward Andrews has an uncredited role as the crook in the police station who was just arrested by Starsky, and Robert Loggia has a role as the crime boss Benjamin Forest.
6	6	"Death Notice"	William Crain	Robert C. Dennis	October 15, 1975
When a message is left scrawled on a table cloth in a strip club, owned by Manny Birnbaum (Milt Kogan), that one of the strippers, Ginger (Suzanne Charney), will be killed. Starsky and Hutch are called in to protect the ladies, and find the strange man who was sitting at the table. The hunt for this man intensifies when Ginger is found murdered, and another stripper, Sonia (Rosanne Katon), is warned in a message that she's next. The accused man who scrawled the note at the strip club was Anton Rusz (Ivor Francis), a Hungarian immigrant, but in a surprise twist, leads Starsky and Hutch to realize the suspect that they pursued is not the killer.
7	7	"Pariah"	Bob Kelljan	Michael Fisher	October 22, 1975
When Starsky and Hutch respond to an armed robbery, one of the masked robbers, 22-year-old Joseph Tramaine (Gregory Rozakis), gets away with $200, and Starsky is forced to fatally shoot the other robber in self-defense -- and the robber that Starsky shot turns out to be 16-year-old Lonnie Malcolm Craig. Lonnie's mother Eunice (Hilda Hayes) is devastated, and Starsky feels extremely guilty. A coroner's inquest is then opened: Tramaine turns out to be a drug-addict who commits robberies to get money to feed his addiction with. The case gets the attention of George A. Prudholm (Stephen McNally): a thoroughly enraged man with a grudge against Starsky. George calls the station and warns them that if Starsky is cleared, then the cops will pay in spades. Starsky is cleared of any wrong-doing, and he and Hutch want to find whoever supplied Lonnie with the gun. Because Starsky was cleared, George starts killing cops while demanding Starsky's resignation, promising that the killings will continue until Starsky complies. Two years before the occurrence, Starsky and Hutch's first assignment after being promoted out of uniform, was working an undercover narcotics investigation at McKinley High School: Starsky arrested George's 19-year-old son, Gary Vincent Prudholm, for drug-dealing, who then got stabbed to death in the city jail. George was devastated, and he has always blamed Starsky for Gary's death. George wants Starsky to pay in spades by being forced to resign, and get his name dragged through the mud before George gets his chance to kill Starsky. Note: This is Stephan McNally's first of two appearances as Crazy George Prudholm, and Anita Ford also appears in this episode.
8	8	"Kill Huggy Bear"	Michael Schultz	Fred Freiberger	October 29, 1975
Dewey Hughes (Roger Robinson), an old "acquaintance" of Huggy Bear's, robs a candy store, shooting Roy Jones (Ed Cambridge), the man who runs the store, and Starsky and Hutch investigate. Dewey, seeing how much money he has taken, goes to Huggy, warning him that the store is actually a front for a numbers racket run by crime boss Lou Malinda (Hamilton Camp). Dewey, who once saved Huggy's life and calling in the debt, asks Huggy to use his underworld contacts and return the $50,000 to Lou if he forgives him for the robbery. As a result, Huggy winds up owing the $50,000 to Lou. Starsky and Hutch learn that the police department's gambling squad had the store under surveillance for some time. Captain Dobey would love for Starsky and Hutch to nail Lou, and outwit the gambling squad on this bust. Dewey's girlfriend, Sarah Kingston (Gloria Edwards), and her new lover, Harry Martin (Dick Anthony Williams) learn about the $50,000 that Harry in now in Huggy's possession. Harry murders Dewey, then in a joint effort, Harry and Sarah mug Huggy of the money before he can return it. Starsky and Hutch must work fast to save Huggy -- Lou had vowed to kill him if the money isn't returned.
9	9	"The Bait"	Ivan Dixon	Story by : James Schmerer & Don Balluck; Teleplay by : James Schmerer & Don Balluck & Edward J. Lakso	November 5, 1975
Starsky and Hutch work undercover as Rafferty and O'Brien, flashy drug dealers from Texas, in an operation to put a heroin syndicate out of business. They spring Cheryl Waite (Lynne Marta), a young woman arrested for unwillingly acting as a drug courier, from jail, and they convince her to act as a lure in a bid to nail Mr. Danner (Charles McCaulay), the elusive drug kingpin who is the head of the syndicate. But Danner is having his right-hand man, Billy Harkness (Michael DeLano), keep an eye on them to make sure nothing suspicious is going on. Cheryl tells Starsky and Hutch that her roommate and friend, Joanne Stockwood, who had become addicted to heroin, has been missing for four weeks. Cheryl knows Danner had something to do with it, and Starsky and Hutch agree to look for Joanne. Later, Starsky and Hutch go to Cheryl's place to find that she's been beaten up by Billy. Cheryl says she can't help Starsky and Hutch anymore, because Billy will kill her if she does. Hutch lets Cheryl stay at his place. Billy is killed in a confrontation, and Dobey tells Starsky and Hutch that Joanne was found dead of a heroin overdose, washed up on a beach. Cheryl, who is devastated, tells Starsky and Hutch that Joanne was trying to kick the heroin habit. Starsky and Hutch realize that Danner knew that, and he decided that he couldn't trust Joanne anymore, having her killed. Starsky and Hutch decide to use Danner's history as a stamp collector to try to lure him out in the open. Problem is, one of Danner's men, Shockley (David Cass), knows who Hutch is, because he arrested Shockley before for dealing.
10	10	"Lady Blue"	Don Weis	Michael Mann	November 12, 1975
Starsky's ex-girlfriend Helen Davidson, a fellow cop, is found murdered, with her body bizarrely wrapped in radio antenna wire. As Starsky and Hutch investigate, it is revealed that Helen had been working undercover as a go-go dancer at the Mellow Yellow to stop a violent burglary ring, and she had been undercover for two months. The Mellow Yellow, owned by Ruby Solenko (Victor Argo), is to be the ring's de facto headquarters. Two days before Helen was killed, she spotted someone tailing her, and was afraid that her cover was blown. There are several suspects as to the killer's unknown identity, as the detectives realize that they're up against a serial killer. Note: Elisha Cook Jr. appears in this episode as Polly The Snitch.
11	11	"Captain Dobey, You're Dead"	Michael Schultz	Michael Fisher	November 19, 1975
Starsky and Hutch are put on the case when Captain Dobey and his family are terrorized by Leo Moon (William Watson), a crooked ex-Cop who has just escaped from prison and is determined to make Dobey pay in spades for putting him away. Dobey and Moon went through the police academy together. About five years ago, Moon was convicted of extortion and murder. Dobey was instrumental in putting Moon away, and now Moon wants to make Dobey pay in spades for that. But Dobey is trying to solve a cold case -- the murder of civil rights leader Isaac Douglas, who was one of Dobey's best friends and was killed a little over a year ago. Starsky and Hutch gets a lead on a company called Woodfield Industries, whose CEO is C. J. Woodfield (Lester Rawlins). Starsky and Hutch suspect that Woodfield might be involved up to his neck in Douglas's murder because Woodfield Industries was one of the companies that Douglas named as getting special treatment on city contracts. Starsky and Hutch figure out that Douglas had the goods on Woodfield, so he had Douglas killed. Dobey re-opens the murder investigation, heating things up for Woodfield, so the corrupt CEO had Moon sprung from prison to kill Dobey for him, to which Moon would be all too happy to do. Note: Only episode in which Captain Dobey's family appear. Lynn Hamilton appears in this episode as Edith Dobey, and Taaffe O'Connell also appears as Lola Brenner.
12	12	"Terror on the Docks"	Randal Kleiser	Fred Freiberger	November 26, 1975
Starsky and Hutch are tracking down a dock-worker suspected of murdering Officer Ed Jamieson (Joe Warfield), an undercover cop investigating a series of waterfront heists. Hutch's childhood friend, Nancy Blake (Sheila Larken), is preparing to get married, and it seems that her groom-to-be, Billy Desmond (Stephen McHattie), might be involved in the heists. Note: Stephen McHattie appears in this episode as Billy.
13	13	"The Deadly Imposter"	Dick Moder	Story by : Mann Rubin; Teleplay by : Michael Fisher & Parke Perine & Mann Rubin	December 10, 1975
John Colby (Art Hindle), an old academy friend of Starsky and Hutch, had ended up leaving the department and going into the Air Force. Now, John shows up with a story about being presumed dead while spending five years in a POW camp in Vietnam, asking them to help him find his ex-wife Karen (Suzan Gailey) and young son Corey. Starsky and Hutch are happy to help out an old friend, but when they locate Karen, she says she's never seen John before in her life. As it turns out, John's actually an imposter named Mike, a hit-man hired by local crime boss Nate Garvin (Gene Darcy). Karen is now the wife of Warren G. Karpel (Peter Brandon), a former chief accountant who previously worked for Nate Garvin. Warren, now a federal witness willing to testify against Garvin, Mike is the assassin hired to kill Warren. Note: Gordon Jump's last appearance as the owner of Vinnie's Gym, also Art Hindle appears in this episode as John Colby, and this is the first of Ann Foster's four guest appearances as Abigail Crabtree.
14	14	"Shootout"	Fernando Lamas	David P. Harmon	December 17, 1975
After the particularly long and awkward interrogation with a suspect who has been accused of putting a 19-year-old woman in a coma, Starsky and Hutch decide to unwind for the evening by going for a meal at Giovanni's, an Italian restaurant down by the docks. But the evening out is hardly the relaxing time that they had anticipated: the mostly empty restaurant is taken over by Tom Lockly (Albert Paulsen) and Joey Martin (Steven Keats), two hit-men planning to kill powerful mob boss Vic Monte upon arrival at the restaurant. Theresa De Fusto (Jess Walton), who runs the restaurant, set Monte up for revenge for having her teenage brother killed. In addition, Joey and Tom have threatened to kill Theresa's mother if her daughter does not help them. Among the hostages are a hapless comedian, Sammy Grovner (Norman Fell), and his companion, Robin Morton (Barbara Rhoades). In the initial commotion, Joey shoots Starsky in the back, leaving him severely wounded. Hutch must try to keep Starsky alive, while appeasing the killers and making sure no harm befalls any of the other hostages. Note: Huggy Bear says Starsky's full name: David Michael Starsky. Danny Wells appears in this episode as Harry Sample, Jess Walton appears in this episode as Theresa Defusto. Also, Farrah Fawcett has an uncredited role as the party guest, and Norman Fell appears in this episode as Sammy Grovner.
15	15	"The Hostages"	George McCowan	Edward J. Lakso	January 7, 1976
Starsky and Hutch do a favor for a waitress at the local diner where they have their breakfast, and stumble upon the body of a murdered security guard. This leads them to discover a plot to rob an armored car by an experienced gang, who is not only holding hostage driver Tom Cole (John Ritter), but his pregnant wife, Ellie (Linda Kelsey), threatening to kill her if he fails to obey their orders. Note: John Ritter appears in this episode as Tom Cole, Jean Hagen appears in this episode as Belle Kates, Linda Kelsey appears in this episode as Ellie Cole, Nellie Bellflower makes one of two appearances as Sweet Alice, and Kristy McNichol appears as Meg.
16	16	"Losing Streak"	Don Weis	Story by : Robert I. Holt; Teleplay by : Michael Fisher	January 14, 1976
Six months ago, for five weeks, down-on-his-luck jazz pianist Vic Rankin (Dane Clark) played piano at the GW, a jazz club, owned by Gil White (Arthur David Roberts), who never paid him, owing Vic $2000. After being assaulted by White's right-hand man, Gordon Foote (Zitto Kazann), Vic steals $2000, unaware that the money is actually counterfeit. In over his head, Vic finds himself a pursued man on the run. White, who is connected to the Mob, sends his heavies out to retrieve the money, as well as kill the man who dared to steal it. It's a race against time for Starsky and Hutch to find Vic before White and his men find him. Note: Dane Clark and Jacqueline Scott appear in this episode as Vic and Evelyn Rankin, Zitto Kazann also appears in this episode as Gordon Foote, an earlier appearance from Arthur Roberts, and Connie Hoffman's one of two appearances.
17	17	"Silence"	George McCowan	Story by : Donald R. Boyle; Teleplay by : Parke Perine	January 21, 1976
Responding to a shoplifting complaint, Starsky and Hutch encounter a child-like deaf mute struggling to turn his life around. Unfortunately, the tough-talking priest, who runs the halfway house where he lives, is using his position to compel residents into committing crimes.
18	18	"Omaha Tiger"	Don Weis	Edward J. Lakso	January 28, 1976
After a retired ex-cop and friend is murdered at his new job running the concession business at a sports arena, Starsky and Hutch are drawn into the world of Professional Wrestling. Note: James Luisi known for playing Lieutenant Doug Chapman on the Rockford Files guest stars as the arena manager. Richard Kiel plays Mummy, a wrestler.
19	19	"JoJo"	George McCowan	Michael Mann	February 18, 1976
Starsky and Hutch run afoul of federal agent Bettin, when his scheme to collar crime kingpin Dombarris puts the psychopathic serial rapist Jojo back on the streets. Starsky and Hutch are then determined to put him away for good. Note: This episode was written by Michael Mann, the creator of Miami Vice.
20	20	"Running"	Don Weis	Michael Fisher	February 25, 1976
A Junior High School classmate of Starsky, who found fame as a high fashion model, suffers an emotional breakdown from a series of personal tragedies and the pressures of stardom. Fleeing to a rough part of Bay City, she then falls into a downward spiral of depression and alcohol abuse. When she is victimized by a burglar, who murders any witnesses to his crimes, Starsky is inadvertently drawn back into her life. Against the very strong objections of his partner Hutch, Starsky relocates her to his residence and attempts to help her get back on her feet. As Hutch reluctantly covers for his partner, the depraved individual committing the burglaries, is closing in on her. Note: Jan Smithers, who played Bailey Quarters on WKRP in Cincinnati, guest stars. Bond girl (and Natalie Wood's sister) Lana Wood plays Ella.
21	21	"A Coffin for Starsky"	George McCowan	Arthur Rowe	March 3, 1976
Starsky is drugged and injected with a slow-acting poison by an unknown assailant. After convincing the Doctor to release him from the hospital, Starsky joins Hutch in a desperate 24-hour search to find the person who injected him, and learn the nature of the poison in a last-ditch attempt to save his life.
22	22	"Bounty Hunter"	Don Weis	Steve Fisher	April 21, 1976
Starsky and Hutch investigate an arson and murder, instigated by the ruthless owner of a bail bonds company, and the dangerous Bounty Hunter protecting her interests.

=== Season 2 (1976–77) ===
No. overall	No. in season	Title	Directed by	Written by	Original release date	Prod. code
23	1	"The Las Vegas Strangler: Parts 1 & 2"	George McCowan	Michael Fisher	September 25, 1976	201-202
24	2	"The Las Vegas Strangler: Parts 1 & 2"	George McCowan	Michael Fisher	September 25, 1976	201-202
Starsky and Hutch are temporarily assigned to the Las Vegas Police Department to assist in the capture of a serial killer targeting Vegas Showgirls. After arriving in the city the detectives learn that the assignment was not random and Hutch may have ties to the prime suspect in the murders. Note: Lynda Carter of Wonder Woman fame appears in the episode as a target of the killer. Also features the new theme music by Tom Scott entitled Gotcha. It replaces the original music composed by Lalo Schifrin and used for the entirety of season one.
25	3	"Murder at Sea: Parts 1 & 2"	George McCowan	Ron Friedman	October 2, 1976	203-204
26	4	"Murder at Sea: Parts 1 & 2"	George McCowan	Ron Friedman	October 2, 1976	203-204
After a ship's Purser involved in a cocaine smuggling operation is murdered, Starsky and Hutch join the ship's crew as entertainers Hak and Zak. Their subsequent investigation uncovers a meeting between rival mob bosses to determine the leader of organized crime activity in Bay City. When the meeting goes awry, five explosive devices are set to destroy the ship eliminating all witnesses.
27	5	"Gillian"	George McCowan	Story by : Amanda J. Green; Teleplay by : Ben Masselink	October 16, 1976	205
Detective Sergeant Hutchinson enters into a passionate relationship with a beautiful and cultured woman Gillian (Karen Carlson). While investigating a brutal daylight murder that occurred near an infamous sex shop, Starsky inadvertently discovers that Gillian is working as a prostitute for a crazed gangster and his domineering mother (Sylvia Sidney). Note: Karen Carlson was married to David Soul at the time of filming.
28	6	"Bust Amboy"	George W. Brooks	Ron Friedman	October 23, 1976	206
A powerful mobster Amboy is controlling drugs and prostitution becomes a personal target of Detectives Starsky and Hutchinson. After an attempt to bribe them fails miserably, the two protagonists redouble their efforts to bring him down. Yanked off the case under charges of harassment by two federal undercover agents working the scene, both detectives hear from a call girl that Amboy is about to skip town, and are placed on sick leave by a sympathetic Captain Dobey. Now acting on their own, the detectives uncover a major drug deal about to occur. After tracking the suspects to a Funeral Parlor acting as a front for a brothel, Starsky and Hutch not only confront the corrupt undercover agents, but also Amboy and his henchmen.
29	7	"The Vampire"	Bob Kelljan	Michael Grais & Mark Victor	October 30, 1976	207
After the mysterious late night murder of an exotic dancer, the investigation reveals that elements of vampirism and sanguivorism are present in the crime when the victim is found drained of her blood. While the city is gripped in fear, Starsky and Hutch investigate a lead from an occultist, involving the detectives in a disturbing subculture of Satanism and the supernatural. When a connection is made between two of the attack victims and a dance school, the disabled dance instructor (John Saxon) becomes the prime suspect. Both detectives then make an effort to prevent any further attacks and apprehend the criminal. Note: Suzanne Somers makes her second of three appearances in the series, each time playing a different character.
30	8	"The Specialist"	Fernando Lamas	Robert Earll	November 6, 1976	208
While Starsky and Hutch and two uniformed cops are chasing fleeing criminals, an unfortunate woman by-stander is killed in the crossfire. The situation is ruled as an accidental death, but the woman's husband doesn't accept it. When the two uniformed cops involved are both murdered, Starsky and Hutch suspect the husband, who they learn is an unstable former government agent who believes that he was the intended victim in an assassination plot.
31	9	"Tap Dancing Her Way Right Back Into Your Hearts"	Fernando Lamas	Edward J. Lakso	November 20, 1976	209
Starsky goes undercover as Ramone, a tap-dance instructor, whilst Hutch poses as a wealthy Texan rancher and dance student, Charlie McCabe, to expose a blackmail operation.
32	10	"Vendetta"	Bob Kelljan	Don Patterson	November 27, 1976	210
An investigation of a series of brutal assaults leads Starsky and Hutch to Arty Solkin, a Fagin-like character who is manipulating a troubled teen (an escapee from an insane asylum) into wreaking havoc on his victims. When Arty targets Hutch, he and his girlfriend, Abigail, are to be the madman's next victims.
33	11	"Nightmare"	Randal Kleiser	Steve Fisher	November 28, 1976	211
Two thugs rape and assault a mentally handicapped teenage girl, but the court case is dropped. Bad news for them: Lisa is a friend of Starsky & Hutch, who relentlessly stop at nothing to see them put behind bars. Carl Weathers appears as Al Martin.
34	12	"Iron Mike"	Don Weis	Story by : Arthur Norman; Teleplay by : Ron Friedman & Arthur Norman	December 18, 1976	212
Starsky and Hutch inadvertently discover that a highly-revered police captain (guest star Michael Conrad) may be in collusion with a criminal.
35	13	"Little Girl Lost"	Earl Bellamy	Ben Masselink	December 25, 1976	213
Molly "Pete" Edwards, a young girl living with her alcoholic, ex-con father, finds herself suddenly orphaned just before Christmas. Starsky and Hutch attempt to help her when her father's partners-in-crime come looking for her... and a hidden cache of stolen diamonds. Note: Kristy McNichol guest stars as Molly.
36	14	"Bloodbath"	Paul Michael Glaser	Story by : Christopher Joy & Wanda Coleman; Teleplay by : Ron Friedman	January 1, 1977	214
In retaliation for arresting the mass murdering cult leader Simon Marcus, Starsky is kidnapped by Marcus's followers, and held prisoner in a secret underground cult compound. Hutch attempts to decipher Marcus's cryptic clues and find his friend, before Starsky is murdered as a sacrifice.
37	15	"The Psychic"	Don Weis	Michael Mann	January 15, 1977	215
A burnt-out psychic running a diner helps Starsky and Hutch by providing clues, using his clairvoyant abilities, when the schoolgirl daughter of a wealthy football team owner is kidnapped.
38	16	"The Set-Up: Part 1"	George McCowan	Joe Reb Moffly	January 22, 1977	216
Starsky and Hutch are assigned to protect a criminal who's supposed to testify against his associates, but someone kills him. Later, the man who kills him claims to have no remorse because the mobster killed his wife. However, when they check his story, they find out that he doesn't exist and neither did his wife. He tries to show them all the things he remembers like the hospital he was in, which turns out to be a convent, as well the bank account he withdrew from which doesn't exist. Both detectives wonder what is going on, as well as who is secretly pulling the strings.
39	17	"The Set-Up: Part 2"	George McCowan	Joe Reb Moffly	January 29, 1977	217
Terry Nash confesses to assassinating a mob boss turned informant just before he was about to testify, in retaliation for his wife's murder. Starsky and Hutch discover that nothing Terry remembers is real, and they work to unravel an elaborate conspiracy with the help of Nash, Capt. Dobey, and Huggy Bear's pilot friend "The Black Baron" (guest star Roger E. Mosley).
40	18	"Survival"	David Soul	Tim Maschler	February 5, 1977	218
When Hutch goes missing after he is ambushed by a hitman on a lonely mountain road, Starsky must depend on the help of a mentally-addled World War II veteran and a young ham radio operator to find him before it's too late.
41	19	"Starsky's Lady"	Georg Stanford Brown	Robert Earll	February 12, 1977	219
George Prudholm, who previously appeared in the season 1 episode "Pariah", has a grudge against Starsky. His desire for revenge puts Starsky's girlfriend, Terry Roberts (Season Hubley), a special education teacher, in the line of fire.
42	20	"Huggy Bear and the Turkey"	Jack Starrett	Ron Friedman	February 19, 1977	220
Informant Huggy Bear goes into business on his own with the help of Turkey, an aspiring private eye. NOTE: This turkey was the lowest-rated "Starsky and Hutch" ever.
43	21	"The Committee"	George McCowan	Robert I. Holt	February 26, 1977	221
A cadre of corrupt cops is taking the law into its own hands, acting as judge, jury and executioner of hardened criminals freed by a soft judicial system. Starsky goes undercover as a disgruntled cop to infiltrate the vigilante group.
44	22	"The Velvet Jungle"	Earl Bellamy	Parke Perine	March 5, 1977	222
A Costa Rican seamstress is murdered in the garment district, but an immigration official seeks to squash Starsky and Hutch's investigation. The interference only stirs their suspicions and strengthens their resolve to catch the killer.
45	23	"Long Walk Down a Short Dirt Road"	George McCowan	Edward J. Lakso	March 12, 1977	223
Sue Ann Grainger, a country and western singer, is stalked by a gravelly-voiced psychopath who insists that she owes him $10,000. Stalling the investigation is her resistance to Starsky and Hutch's offer to help track down the extortioner. Notes: Country star Lynn Anderson stars as singer Sue Ann Grainger. In one scene, Starsky says that Hutch sounds like Dirty Harry. Hutch asks "Who?" and Starsky replies "Dirty Harry, a cop in San Francisco". David Soul had appeared in Magnum Force, the second Harry Callahan movie. Harry is responsible for Soul's characters death in the movie.
46	24	"Murder on Stage 17"	Earl Bellamy	Ben Masselink	March 19, 1977	224
A set of a Western movie is the site of a murder, another in a series of killings targeting members of its star, Steve Hanson's, Wolf Pack club. Starsky and Hutch go undercover as stuntmen to protect Steve and find out who the murderer really is. Note: Jeff Goldblum stars as the movie's director.
47	25	"Starsky and Hutch Are Guilty"	Bob Kelljan	David P. Harmon	April 16, 1977	225
A pair of Starsky and Hutch look-a-likes, hired by a shady lawyer to discredit the detectives, hit the streets in an imitation Striped Tomato Gran Torino, terrorizing informants and extorting money from citizens. The real Starsky and Hutch must try to clear their names and nab the impostors, before their badges are revoked and their reputations ruined. Note: Gary Eppe, who played Hutch look-a-like Hanson, was David Soul's stunt double.

=== Season 3 (1977–78) ===
No. overall	No. in season	Title	Directed by	Written by	Original release date	Prod. code
48	1	"Starsky & Hutch on Voodoo Island: Part 1 & 2"	George McCowan	Ron Friedman	September 17, 1977	301-302
49	2	"Starsky & Hutch on Voodoo Island: Part 1 & 2"	George McCowan	Ron Friedman	September 17, 1977	301-302
The boys are tasked with investigating Voodoo Island. The island is owned by billionaire William Thorne. A series of deaths has attracted the attention of the authorities; they believe the appearance of Johnny Doors, a high ranking crime syndicate figure may indicate an attempt to take over the financial empire by the Mob. Note: Joan Collins guest stars as photographer Janice.
50	3	"Fatal Charm"	Earl Bellamy	Jeff Kanter	September 24, 1977	303
Starsky and Hutch are on a sting operation to catch a major drug dealer. While on the case Hutch meets a young nurse who wants to become his girlfriend, whom he discovers not only has a very nasty jealous streak, but is also a delusional and murderous stalker. Note: Karen Valentine guest stars as the nurse dangerously obsessed with Hutch. Roz Kelly plays Officer Linda Bayley. Had Glazer not returned this character would have most likely replaced Starsky.
51	4	"I Love You, Rosey Malone"	Rick Edelstein	Tim Maschler	October 1, 1977	304
Starsky gets involved with the daughter of a mobster.
52	5	"Murder Ward"	Earl Bellamy	Anthony Yerkovich	October 8, 1977	305
Starsky arranges to be committed to a mental asylum, where Hutch has been planted undercover as a male nurse, to investigate why this particular hospital is suddenly having such a high fatality rate. Note: Suzanne Somers returns for her third (unrelated) guest appearance as reporter Jane Hutton. Otis Day and Vincent Schiavelli guest as fellow inmates.
53	6	"Death in a Different Place"	Sutton Roley	Tom Bagen	October 15, 1977	306
Starsky's childhood mentor, Police Lt John Blaine, is found dead under compromising circumstances that reveal him to be a closet homosexual. Starsky and Hutch must contend with their views on homosexuality as they try to solve the homicide.
54	7	"The Crying Child"	Georg Stanford Brown	James Schmerer	October 22, 1977	307
When their schoolteacher friend, Carol Wade, discovers a terrible secret about one of her students, she turns to Starsky and Hutch for help. They learn about the challenges facing the Child Abuse Unit. Notes: Scream Queen Dee Wallace guest stars as Carol Wade. Rosalind Cash (Lisa in The Omega Man) also guest stars as Sgt. Sheila Peterson.
55	8	"The Heroes"	Georg Stanford Brown	Kathy Donnell & Madeline DiMaggio Wagner	October 29, 1977	308
Reporter Chris Phelps rides along with Starsky and Hutch in order to research an article on "the counter-culture cops, the new breed", as they investigate pushers who are cutting their drugs with strychnine. Note: Karen Carlson (Chris Phelps) previously played the titular character in season 2's "Gillian".
56	9	"The Plague: Part 1"	Bob Kelljan	William Douglas Lansford	November 19, 1977	309
Lt. Jake Donner dies of a mysterious, highly-contagious virus a few days after returning from Europe. Starsky and Hutch try to hunt down the only patient who has survived the disease, as he holds the only possibility of a cure. This man is an international hit man who does not want to be found... and Hutch contracts the virus.
57	10	"The Plague: Part 2"	Bob Kelljan	William Douglas Lansford	November 26, 1977	310
As Hutch fights for his life when quarantined with a deadly virus, Starsky continues the search for the only hope of a cure, an elusive hit man who recovered from the disease. Starsky even confronts the hit man's target and turns to the media for help.
58	11	"The Collector"	Ivan Nagy	Don Patterson	December 3, 1977	311
An acrophobic former child star, turned loan shark, suddenly finds herself working with a new collector with a hidden agenda. Note: Danny DeVito plays bookie John "John John the Apple" DeAppoliso.
59	12	"Manchild on the Streets"	David Soul	Story by : Steve Fisher; Teleplay by : Rick Edelstein	December 10, 1977	312
A Black friend of Starsky and Hutch is shot by a cop who tries to cover it up by lying. When a witness says the cop is lying, the man's son is so upset that his father died and that the man who killed him will probably not be punished, he wants to get away, so he turns to a friend to get money. The guy convinces him the best way to get it is to rob the pharmacy at the hospital.
60	13	"The Action"	Ivan Nagy	Story by : Al Friedman; Teleplay by : Al Friedman & Robert Swanson	January 7, 1978	313
When a friend of theirs is severely beaten due to gambling debts, Starsky and Hutch go undercover as high rollers to investigate illegal gambling at the Marlborough Health Club. Note: Melanie Griffith, John Carradine, and M. Emmet Walsh guest star.
61	14	"The Heavyweight"	Earl Bellamy	Story by : Norman Borisoff; Teleplay by : Robert Swanson	January 14, 1978	314
Starsky and Hutch investigate the murder of an undercover officer in the warehouse district and a witness finds that he is unable to come forward due to complex circumstances in the world of boxing.
62	15	"A Body Worth Guarding"	Rick Edelstein	Story by : Sam Paley; Teleplay by : Sam Paley & Rick Edelstein	January 25, 1978	315
Due to threats on her life, Starsky and Hutch are assigned to protect a visiting Russian ballerina. Hutch, a big fan who is impressed by her talent, is disappointed by her bristling personality due to a bad first impression with each other.
63	16	"The Trap"	Earl Bellamy	Story by : Sid Green; Teleplay by : Sid Green & Robert Swanson	February 1, 1978	316
Starsky & Hutch are lured into a trap by an ex-con seeking revenge for the death of his brother, which he blames on Hutch. They discover a stowaway in the Torino, which complicates matters. Note: Kristy McNichol's third appearance in the series.
64	17	"Satan's Witches"	Nicolas Sgarro	Bob Barbash	February 8, 1978	317
A weekend trip to Captain Dobey's cabin turns sinister for Starsky & Hutch when they discover a Satanic cult across the lake and try to determine why the sheriff and the local people of the nearby small town are treating them so strangely. Note: Charles Napier guest stars as the small-town sheriff.
65	18	"Class in Crime"	Paul Michael Glaser	Don Patterson	February 15, 1978	318
Hutch goes undercover as a college student to catch a professor committing murder. Notes: Peter MacLean and Rebecca Balding guest star.
66	19	"Hutchinson: Murder One"	Bob Kelljan	Story by : Jackson Gillis; Teleplay by : Robert Swanson	February 22, 1978	319
Hutch becomes the prime suspect when his ex-wife is murdered in his apartment - with Hutch's gun as the murder weapon. Notes: Veronica Hamel appears as Hutch's ex wife. Bill Duke appears as an internal affairs officer investigating the murder.
67	20	"Foxy Lady"	Nicolas Sgarro	Robert Swanson	March 1, 1978	320
A witness to a murder plans to skip town. Note: Priscilla Barnes plays the duplicitous witness.
68	21	"Partners"	Charles Picerni	Rick Edelstein	May 3, 1978	321
During a high-speed chase, Starsky's reckless driving lands the partners in the hospital, where Hutch appears to be stricken with amnesia. After, Starsky push a pair of bank robbers off the road and crash their car. Starsky attempts to revive Hutch's memory by reminding him of their past adventures. Notes: Ralph Nelson and Kathleen King guest star.
69	22	"Quadromania"	Rick Edelstein	Anthony Yerkovich	May 10, 1978	322
Starsky poses as a cabbie in order to catch a serial killer (Richard Lynch) who has already murdered four other taxi drivers. Philip Michael Thomas makes a pre-Miami Vice appearance as cabbie controller Kingston St. Jacques, as does Lynne Marta who was dating David Soul at the time.
70	23	"Deckwatch"	Paul Michael Glaser	Don Patterson	May 17, 1978	323
A serial killer who preys on prostitutes is wounded during his latest attack. When he takes Hutch's friend and her invalid mother hostage in their home, Hutch poses as a paramedic to get inside the house. Note: Kathryn Harrold plays Laura, Hutch's friend in peril and Susan French her invalid mother.

=== Season 4 (1978–79) ===
No. overall	No. in season	Title	Directed by	Written by	Original release date	Prod. code
71	1	"Discomania"	Arthur Marks	Rick Edelstein	September 12, 1978	401
Along with a female officer, the Detectives go undercover at Fever, a popular discotheque, in order to set a trap for a serial killer who is murdering women that refuse to dance with him. Note: Adrian Zmed appears as a 'John Travolta type' dancer.
72	2	"The Game"	Leo Penn	Tim Maschler	September 19, 1978	402
After the duo fail to capture a wanted felon, Hutch bets that he can successfully elude Starsky for 48 hours. The game becomes deadly serious when Starsky discovers that Hutch has unknowingly eaten soup contaminated with botulism. Note: Jack Ging guest stars.
73	3	"Blindfold"	Leo Penn	Pat Fielder & Richard Bluel	September 26, 1978	403
Starsky is grief-stricken when Emily Harrison is accidentally blinded by a shot from his gun. Note: Kim Cattrall guest stars as Emily.
74	4	"Photo Finish"	Sutton Roley	Story by : Michael Wagner & Robert Swanson; Teleplay by : Robert Swanson	October 10, 1978	404
When philandering artist Tony Braddock meets his doom, Starsky and Hutch begin some black-tie sleuthing on the champagne circuit. Note: Sally Kirkland plays Greta Wren / Dora Pruitt.
75	5	"Moonshine"	Reza Badiyi	Fred Freiberger	October 17, 1978	405
Starsky and Hutch pose as good old country boys in order to track down moonshiners who have brewed up a lethal batch of bootleg hooch. Notes:Billy Green Bush guests as Willy Hall. Benson star James Noble plays Treasury Agent Kendall. Mary Louise Weller plays Dolly Ivers.
76	6	"Strange Justice"	Reza Badiyi	Richard Kelbaugh	October 24, 1978	406
A veteran cop's daughter is raped and the cop shoots the suspect - Starsky and Hutch try to keep the cop out of trouble and also put the rapist in jail. Notes: Kenneth McMillan plays Lieutenant Dan Slate and Mary Crosby (billed here as Mary Francis Crosby) plays his daughter Leslie.
77	7	"The Avenger"	Sutton Roley	Robert Swanson	October 31, 1978	407
Starsky unknowingly places himself in serious danger when the detectives investigate a woman's claims that a jealous ex-lover from San Francisco has followed her and is responsible for the murders of her recent one-night stands. Notes: Joanna Cassidy plays Monique. Tim Thomerson as Phil. John Carpenter regular Charles Cyphers plays medical examiner Delaney. Hildy Brooks appears as Bobbie. Police Academy's G.W. Bailey is an hotel clerk.
78	8	"Dandruff"	Sutton Roley	Ron Friedman	November 14, 1978	408
Starsky and Hutch work undercover in a beauty salon in order to set a trap for an international jewel thief. Notes: Rene Auberjonois and Tracey Walter guest star. The Honeymooners' Audrey Meadows also appears as Hilda Zuckerman.
79	9	"Black and Blue"	Rick Edelstein	Rick Edelstein	November 21, 1978	409
Hutch is wounded by a teenage thief, Starsky dubiously goes to work with his new partner. Notes: Vonetta McGee plays Joan Meredith, Starsky's new partner. Mykelti Williamson appears as a young thief. Veteran Broadway actress Lili Valenty (billed as Lily Valenty) appears as Mrs. Greene.
80	10	"The Groupie"	Nicholas Colasanto	Robert Dellinger	November 28, 1978	410
Starsky and Hutch pose as an eccentric photographer and a timid swimwear buyer when the duo enter the fashion world to investigate a garment-business racketeering ring. Notes: Robert Loggia makes his second guest appearance (in a different role). John Ashton also appears.
81	11	"Cover Girl"	Rick Edelstein	Story by : Dan Ullman; Teleplay by : Robert Dellinger & Rick Edelstein	December 12, 1978	411
A top model (Maud Adams) believes she has terminal cancer and arranges for a genius hit-man to end her life. She discovers the cancer is in remission, but it is too late to cancel the contract, so she turns to old flame Hutch to prevent her own death. Notes: Calvin Lockhart, Marki Bey, and Jeffrey Tambor guest star in the episode.
82	12	"Starsky's Brother (a.k.a. Starsky's Little Brother)"	Arthur Marks	Story by : Ralph Wallace Davenport; Teleplay by : Ralph Wallace Davenport & Robert Earl	December 19, 1978	412
Starsky's little brother, a smalltime hustler, arrives in town to visit Starsky. He's approached by the mob and he thinks he's become a big fish until he gets caught up in a net he can't get out of without Starsky's help. Note: John Herzfeld plays the younger Starsky brother.
83	13	"The Golden Angel"	Sutton Roley	Story by : George Arthur Bloom; Teleplay by : Joe Reb Moffley & Robert Dellinger & George Arthur Bloom	January 16, 1979	413
In order to draw out a suspect, Starsky goes into the ring when he and Hutch are assigned to protect a wrestler who has received a death threat. Note: Ray Walston guest stars as Tommy Reese.
84	14	"Ballad for a Blue Lady"	Paul Michael Glaser	Story by : Sidney Ellis; Teleplay by : Sidney Ellis & Paul Michael Glaser	January 23, 1979	414
Hutch dates a lounge singer and is badly beaten and marked for death by her racketeer brother. Notes: Malachi Throne plays Joe Fitch and Jenny O'Hara plays Marianne Owens.
85	15	"Birds of a Feather"	Charles Picerni	Story by : Amanda J. Green; Teleplay by : Amanda J. Green & Rick Edelstein	January 30, 1979	415
In order to pay off his wife's gambling debts, a former partner of Hutch's arranges for the murder of a witness. Notes: Anne Ramsey, John P. Ryan, Martin Kove, Barbara Stuart and Allan Arbus all guest star. As does Charles Cyphers in his third and final appearance, again playing a different character.
86	16	"Ninety Pounds of Trouble"	Leo Penn	Robert Swanson	February 6, 1979	416
Hutch poses as a hitman and bluffs the murder of Starsky to support his identity after a kid accidentally blows his cover. Notes: Mare Winningham appears alongside Former Bond girl (and sister of Natalie) Lana Wood in her second appearance playing a different character. Ann Prentiss (another actress here with a famous older sister, Paula) also appears.
87	17	"Huggy Can't Go Home (a.k.a. Huggy Can't Go Back)"	David Soul	Story by : Rick Edelstein; Teleplay by : Richard Kelbaugh	February 13, 1979	417
Huggy Bear works alone to help a friend retrieve some stolen money. Notes: Roger E. Mosley, Royce D. Applegate and Richard Ward guest star.
88	18	"Targets Without a Badge: Part 1"	Earl Bellamy	Richard Kelbaugh	March 6, 1979	418
Starsky and Hutch lose Huggy Bear's trust when they are unable to save his close friend from assassination. Notes: Robert Tessier, Ken Kercheval, Ted Neeley and Michelle Davison guest star.
89	19	"Targets Without a Badge: Parts 2 & 3"	Earl Bellamy	Story by : Jeffrey Bloom & Steven Nalevansky; Teleplay by : Joe Reb Moffly	March 11, 1979	419
90	20	"Targets Without a Badge: Parts 2 & 3"	Earl Bellamy	Story by : Jeffrey Bloom & Steven Nalevansky; Teleplay by : Joe Reb Moffly	March 11, 1979	419
Starsky and Hutch have left the police force. They discover that an influential judge is involved in a million-dollar loan shark operation. Notes: William Prince, Hilary Thompson, Richard Herd and Bert Remsen are guest stars.
91	21	"Starsky vs. Hutch"	Peter Levin	Rick Edelstein	May 8, 1979	421
Starsky and Hutch are dating the same undercover policewoman while all three try to catch a dance hall killer. Notes: Yvonne Craig, Joyce Ingalls and Topo Swope guest star. Richard Lynch makes his third and final appearance in the series as the killer Starsky and Hutch are hunting. William Sanderson portrays "a weirdo".
92	22	"Sweet Revenge"	Paul Michael Glaser	Story by : Steven Nalevansky & Joe Reb Moffly; Teleplay by : Steven Nalevansky	May 15, 1979	422
James Marshall Gunther, the businessman who was the lead villain in "Targets Without a Badge" two shows earlier, returns to put out a murder contract on Starsky & Hutch. Starsky is critically wounded and seems to be dying (Hutch took cover & remained unscathed; he told Starsky to get down but it wasn't in time). Hutchinson wants revenge, but can't seem to find Gunther -- until Gunther unexpectedly hands him a present -- the corpse of his own lawyer Bates in Gunther's office. Notes: Series finale. William Prince returns as James Marshall Gunther.
