= Apology for Murder =

1945 film by Sam Newfield

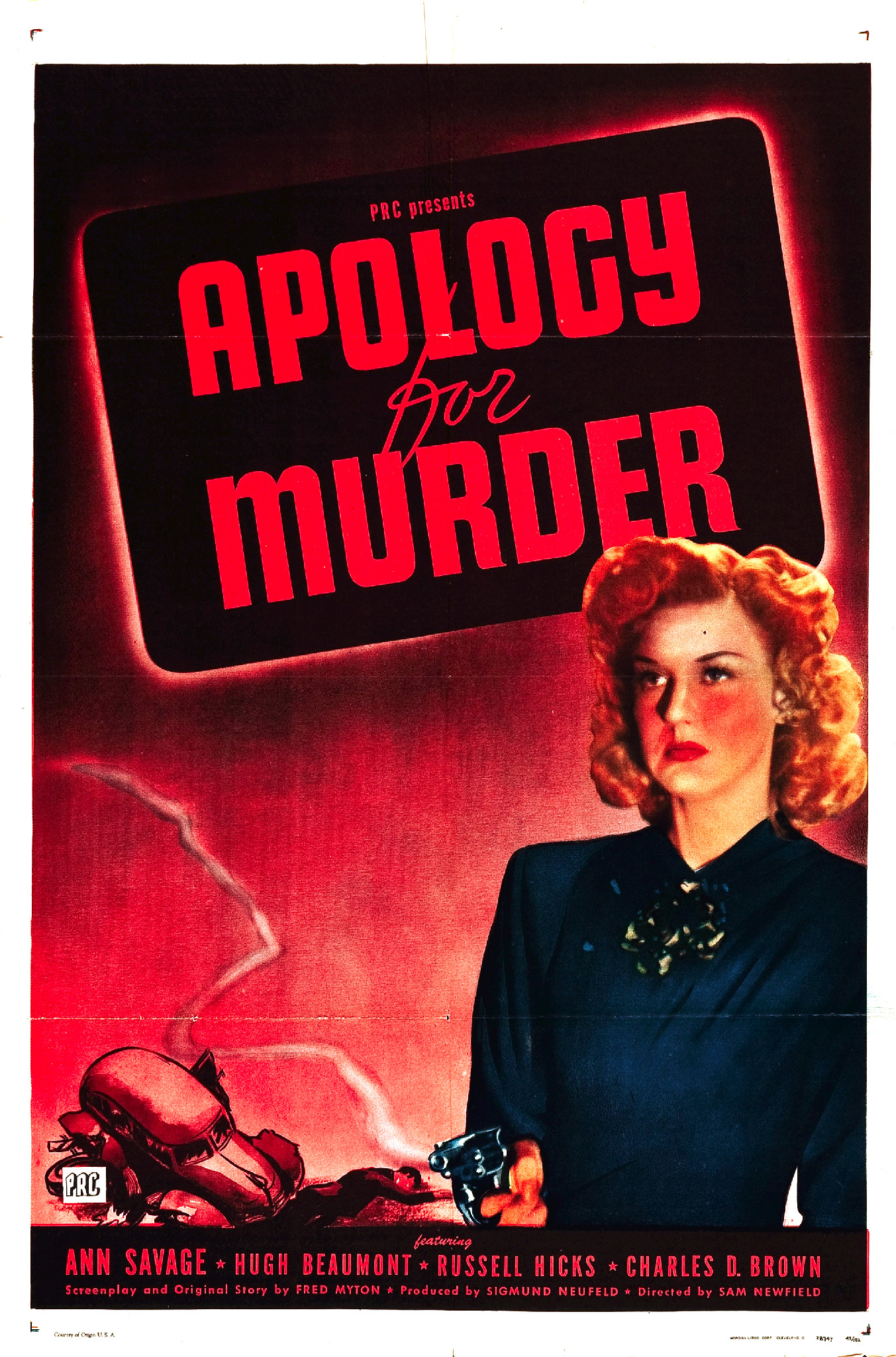
- Theatrical release poster featuring femme fatale Toni (Ann Savage).
- Directed by: Sam Newfield
- Screenplay by: Fred Myton
- Story by: Fred Myton
- Based on: Double Indemnity by; Billy Wilder; Raymond Chandler; Double Indemnity by James M. Cain
- Produced by: Sigmund Neufeld
- Starring: Ann Savage; Hugh Beaumont; Russell Hicks; Charles D. Brown
- Cinematography: Jack Greenhalgh
- Edited by: Richard L. Van Enger
- Music by: Leo Erdody (uncredited)
- Production company: Sigmund Neufeld Productions
- Distributed by: Producers Releasing Corporation
- Release date: September 27, 1945
- Running time: 67 minutes
- Country: United States
- Language: English

Apology for Murder is a 1945 American film noir directed by Sam Newfield and starring Ann Savage, Hugh Beaumont, Russell Hicks and Charles D. Brown.

The plot of Apology for Murder is a blatant rip-off of the seminal film noir Double Indemnity which was released the previous year, based on the novel of the same name. The production company Producers Releasing Corporation, one of the B movie studios of Hollywood’s Poverty Row, wanted to take advantage of Double Indemnity's huge success and originally called the film Single Indemnity. However, Paramount Pictures, the production company of Double Indemnity, obtained an injunction that barred the film's original release under that title. PRC therefore changed the title to Apology for Murder.

Much acclaimed B movie director Edgar G. Ulmer, who was working at PRC at the time Apology for Murder was made, claimed during a 1970 interview with director and film historian Peter Bogdanovich that he wrote the original Single Indemnity script for producer Sigmund Neufeld. Ulmer, though, erroneously believed that the film made from it was finally released under the title Blonde Ice, which is a totally different film produced by Film Classics.

== Plot ==
Tough reporter Kenny Blake (Beaumont) falls in love with sultry Toni Kirkland (Savage) who is married to a much older man (Hicks). She seduces him to murder her husband, watching coldly as Kenny strikes her husband to death on a country road. Together, they push the body of Hicks in his car over a nearby cliff.

It is soon revealed as a murder when the police confirm Hick's car was in neutral gear, plus the body of Hicks did not bleed, signifying he was dead before the crash. City editor Ward McKee (Brown), Kenny's boss and best friend, begins to pursue the tangled threads of the crime relentlessly and gradually closes the net on Kenny. In the end Toni and Kenny shoot each other. As he dies, Kenny types out his confession to the crime.

== Cast ==
- Ann Savage as Toni Kirkland
- Hugh Beaumont as Kenny Blake
- Russell Hicks as Harvey Kirkland
- Charles D. Brown as Ward McKee
- Pierre Watkin as Craig Jordan
- Sarah Padden as Maggie, the Janitress
- Norman Willis as Allen Webb
- Eva Novak as Maid
- Budd Buster as Jed, the Caretaker
- George Sherwood as Police Lt. Edwards
- Wheaton Chambers as Minister
- Arch Hall Sr. as Paul
