= Welcome to Blood City =

1977 film

- Directed by: Peter Sasdy
- Written by: Michael Winder; Stephen Schneck
- Starring: Jack Palance; Keir Dullea; Samantha Eggar
- Cinematography: Reginald H. Morris
- Edited by: Keith Palmer
- Music by: Roy Budd
- Production companies: EMI Films; Stanley Chase Productions
- Release date: 23 August 1977
- Running time: 96 mins.
- Countries: Canada; United Kingdom
- Language: English
- Box office: $CAD900,000

Welcome to Blood City is a 1977 science fiction Western film directed by Peter Sasdy and starring Jack Palance, Keir Dullea and Samantha Eggar.

== Plot ==
Five strangers awake finding themselves with no memory in a world resembling the wild west. Their task is to become exempt from being killed – what the townspeople refer to as being "immortal" – by killing twenty of the other inhabitants of the town under the scrutiny of the sheriff (Jack Palance), otherwise they will spend their lives in slavery.

== Cast ==
- Jack Palance as Frendlander
- Keir Dullea as Lewis
- Samantha Eggar as Katherine
- Barry Morse as Supervisor
- Hollis McLaren as Martine
- Chris Wiggins as Gellor
- Henry Ramer as Chumley
- Allan Royal as Peter
- Jack Creley as Webb
- Alan Crofoot as Sarge
- Gary Reineke as Harry
- Chuck Shamata as Ricardo

== Production ==
Shot in Cinespace Film Studios in Kleinburg, a village north of Toronto, Welcome to Blood City was an early Canada/U.K. co-production.
