= Louis Lipstone =

American conductor

Louis R. Lipstone
- Born: June 5, 1892; Chicago
- Died: March 18, 1954 (aged 61); Beverly Hills, California
- Other name: Louis Ralph Lipstein
- Occupations: Music Director, Paramount Pictures
- Known for: film music
- Spouse: Ruth B. Lipstone (1926–1954, his death)
- Children: Howard Lipstone (film producer, b 1928), Ronald Lipstone (attorney, b 1930)

Louis R. Lipstone (né Louis Ralph Lipstein, June 5, 1892 – March 18, 1954) was head of Paramount Pictures music department from 1939 to 1954.

== Early years ==
A native of Chicago, Lipstone was the son of Harris Lipstein, a Russian immigrant tailor who came to the US in 1888, and Katie Linche Lipstein. Louis Lipstone studied the violin as a child and worked as a violinist in the Majestic Theater and Stratford Hotel in Chicago. His natural talent for music brought him to the attention of the heads of the Balaban and Katz theater circuit, and he became director of the circuit's 300 musicians. Later he was named director of all the B&K stage presentations, a feature of major movie houses in the 20s, and conceived and staged their productions.

== Hollywood ==
After the B&K circuit became a part of Paramount Pictures, Lipstone was sent to Hollywood as head of the studio's music department, succeeding Boris Morros.

== Musical Preferences ==
According to Hugo Friedhofer, Lipstone could not stand the sound of a flute. "He'd say, why don't you give it to the fiddles?" Lipstone also disliked counterpoint and dissonance.

== Double Indemnity ==
Lipstone is perhaps best remembered for his disdain for the score of Double Indemnity, composed by Miklós Rózsa, whose work on Billy Wilder's previous film, Five Graves to Cairo, had been his first real Hollywood engagement for a major studio. Wilder had praised that work and promised to use Rózsa on his next film. Wilder had the idea of using a restless string figure (like the opening to Franz Schubert's Unfinished Symphony) to reflect the conspiratorial activities of the two main characters, Walter and Phyllis, against Phyllis' husband. Rózsa felt Wilder's idea was a good one. As work progressed, Wilder's enthusiasm about Rózsa's score only grew, but Lipstone was of a different mind; he and Wilder had previously clashed over some post-production cuts Lipstone had made to the Five Graves score which created problems with the music's continuity and logic.

When it came time to record the score for Double Indemnity, Lipstone made no secret that he despised what Rózsa had done. Wilder finally turned to Lipstone and snapped, "You may be surprised to hear that I love it. Okay?" Lipstone then disappeared and was not seen at the sessions again. According to Rózsa he later summoned the composer to his office and reprimanded him for writing "Carnegie Hall music" that had no place in a film. Rózsa took this as a compliment, but Lipstone assured him it was not — and suggested he listen to the music from Madame Curie to learn how to write a proper film score. When Rózsa pointed out that Double Indemnity was not a love story, Lipstone suggested his music was more appropriate to The Battle of Russia. Lipstone was convinced that as soon as the studio's Artistic Director, Buddy DeSylva, heard the music he would throw it out. At a screening soon after, DeSylva called him over. Expecting heads to roll, Lipstone eagerly huddled with his chief — only to have DeSylva praise the music, saying it was exactly the dissonant, hard-hitting score the film needed. The boss's only criticism: there was not enough of it. By this time Lipstone had an arm around DeSylva, asking unctuously, "I always find you the right guy for the job, Buddy, don't I?"

The score would go on to be nominated for an Academy Award, and the success brought Rózsa offers to do as many films as he had time for.

== Death ==
Lipstone died at his home, 713 N Maple Drive, Beverly Hills. He had been ill about 10 days. Still not feeling well, he went back to work at Paramount Studios the day of his death, but returned home, where he died at about 6 pm.
