= Jenna Stern =

American actress

- Occupation: Actress
- Years active: 1994–present
- Spouse: Brennan Brown
- Mother: Samantha Eggar
- Relatives: Nicolas Stern (brother)
- Website: jennastern.com

Jenna Stern is an American actress who is noted for a recurring role in Law & Order: Special Victims Unit and appearing in the film Skyscraper.

Stern is the daughter of actress Samantha Eggar and actor and producer Tom Stern. Her brothers are Nicolas Stern and Cameron Cash.

Stern is married to actor Brennan Brown.

== Filmography ==
=== Film ===
| Year | Title | Role | Notes |
|---|---|---|---|
| 1997 | Picture Perfect | 5th Ad Executive | |
| 1999 | The Eden Myth | Doreen Speck | |
| 1999 | Random Hearts | Sally Gabriel | |
| 2000 | Wirey Spindell | Roxanne | |
| 2001 | The Red Right Hand | Rebecca Lawson | |
| 2005 | Hitch | Louise | |
| 2006 | 16 Blocks | Diane Mosley | |
| 2009 | The Hungry Ghosts | Lisa | |
| 2010 | The Best and the Brightest | Katharine Heilmann | |
| 2012 | Little Dad | | Short film |

=== Television ===
| Year | Title | Role | Notes |
|---|---|---|---|
| 1994 | Twilight Zone: Rod Serling's Lost Classics | Susan | Segment: "Where the Dead Are?" |
| 1998 | The Larry Sanders Show | Lisa | Episode: "Pilots and Pens Lost" |
| 1999 | Spin City | Nina Lawrence | Episode: "The Nutty Deputy Mayor" |
| 1999 | Law & Order | A.D.A. Toni Ricci | Episode: "Refuge: Part 1" |
| 2000 | Law & Order: Special Victims Unit | A.D.A. Kathleen Eastman | 2 episodes |
| 2002 | Law & Order: Criminal Intent | Julie Feldman | Episode: "Crazy" |
| 2002 | Widows | Sara Sellick | Episode: "Hour One" |
| 2003 | Queens Supreme | Valerie Williams | Episode: "Flawed Heroes" |
| 2003 | Law & Order | Kathy Teller | Episode: "Blaze" |
| 2005 | Law & Order: Criminal Intent | Janice Steiner | Episode: "My Good Name" |
| 2006 | Six Degrees | | Episode: "Pilot" |
| 2007 | The Sopranos | Dr. Doherty | Episode: "Made in America" |
| 2007 | Gossip Girl | Headmistress | Episode: "Poison Ivy" |
| 2007 | Law & Order: Criminal Intent | Miss Hayworth | Episode: "Endgame" |
| 2008 | Canterbury's Law | Asst. Atty. General Kate Cooley | 2 episodes |
| 2009 | Kings | Doctor | Episode: "Brotherhood" |
| 2009–2010 | Law & Order | Judge Linda Taft | 2 episodes |
| 2011 | Cooper and Stone | Capt. Erica Anderson | TV film |
| 2011 | Are We There Yet? | Mrs. Listens | Episode: "The Man and the Bragging Snafu Episode" |
| 2011 | Law & Order: Criminal Intent | Lauren Langston | Episode: "Cadaver" |
| 2011 | A Gifted Man | Rebecca Marks | Episode: "In Case of Discomfort" |
| 2011–2022 | Law & Order: Special Victims Unit | Judge/Defense Attorney Elana Barth | 20 episodes |
| 2012 | Game Change | Lisa Kline | TV film |
| 2012 | 666 Park Avenue | Regina Wilson | Episode: "Hero Complex" |
| 2015 | House of Cards | Eliana Caspi | 4 episodes |
| 2015 | Show Me a Hero | Gail Shaffer | TV Miniseries |
| 2015 | Blue Bloods | Rose Butler | Episode: "Backstabbers" |
| 2016 | Blindspot | Dr. Lindsay Sparacino | Episode: "Scientists Hollow Fortune" |
| 2016 | Person of Interest | Dr. Mason | Episode: "Reassortment" |
