= Nicolas Stern =

American film producer (born 1965)

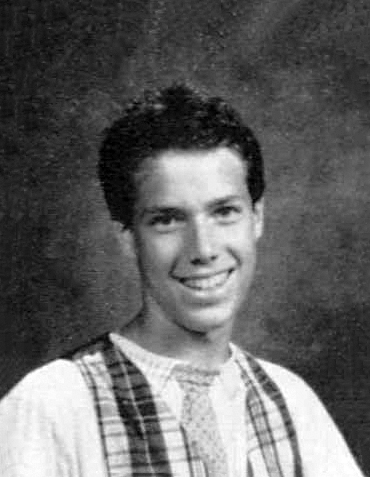
- Stern in 1983
- Born: September 12, 1965 (age 60)
- Occupation: Film producer
- Parent(s): Samantha Eggar; Tom Stern
- Relatives: Jenna Stern (sister)

Nicolas Stern (born September 12, 1965) is an American film producer. Member of an artist family, he is the son of Golden Globe-winning actress Samantha Eggar and actor-producer Tom Stern. His sister, Jenna Stern, is a film actress.

== Selected filmography ==
- In God's Hands (1998)
- Random Hearts (1999)
- American Virgin (2000)
- Training Day (2001)
- Around the Bend (2004)
- Catwoman (2004)
- Starsky & Hutch (2004)
- Torque (2004)
- North Country (2005)
- Rumor Has It... (2005)
- The Holiday (2006)
- Vacancy (2007)
- Warm Bodies (2013)
- Ride Along (2014)
- Creed (2015)
- Ride Along 2 (2016)
- Stronger (2017)
- Like a Boss (2020)
- Creed III (2023)
