= Starsky and Hutch on Playboy Island =

- Written by: Ron Friedman; William Blinn
- Directed by: George McCowan
- Starring: David Soul; Paul Michael Glaser; Samantha Eggar; Joan Collins
- Country of origin: United States
- Original language: English

Production
- Running time: 90 min.

Original release
- Network: ABC
- Release: 1977

Starsky and Hutch on Playboy Island is a 1977 television crime film directed by George McCowan and starring David Soul and Paul Michael Glaser. It was split into 2 parts as the first two episodes of season 3 of the Starsky & Hutch TV series.

== Premise ==
Starsky and Hutch investigate a series of murders among the delegates for a convention, which takes place on a tropical island.

== Cast ==
- David Soul as Det. Ken Hutchinson
- Paul Michael Glaser as Dave Starsky
- Samantha Eggar as Charlotte
- Joan Collins as Janice
- Don Pedro Colley as Papa Theodore
- Anitra Ford as Silky
