= Double Indemnity (1973 film) =

1973 film by Jack Smight

- Genre: Crime; Drama; Romance
- Based on: Double Indemnity by; Billy Wilder; Raymond Chandler; Double Indemnity by James M. Cain
- Teleplay by: Steven Bochco
- Directed by: Jack Smight
- Starring: Richard Crenna; Lee J. Cobb; Robert Webber; Samantha Eggar
- Music by: Billy Goldenberg
- Country of origin: United States
- Original language: English

Production
- Executive producer: David Victor
- Producer: Robert F. O'Neill
- Cinematography: Haskell B. Boggs
- Editor: Edward A. Biery
- Running time: 74 minutes
- Production companies: Groverton Productions; Universal City

Original release
- Network: ABC
- Release: October 13, 1973

Double Indemnity is a 1973 American made-for-television crime film directed by Jack Smight and starring Richard Crenna, Lee J. Cobb, Robert Webber and Samantha Eggar. It was a remake of Double Indemnity (1944) based on the film rather than the original novel.

== Plot ==
Phyllis Dietrichson, a scheming wife, lures insurance salesman Walter Neff into helping murder her husband and then declare it an accident. Neff's boss Barton Keys, not knowing Neff is involved in it, suspects murder and sets out to prove it.

== Cast ==
- Richard Crenna as Walter Neff
- Lee J. Cobb as Barton Keyes
- Robert Webber as Edward Norton
- Samantha Eggar as Phyllis Dietrichson
- Arch Johnson as Dietrickson
- Kathleen Cody as Lola Dietrickson
- John Fiedler as Mr. Jackson
- John Elerick as Donald Franklin
- Joan Pringle as Neff's Secretary
- Gene Dynarski as Sam Bonventura
- Ken Renard as Porter
- Joyce Cunning as Norton's Secretary
- Arnold F. Turner as Redcap (as Arnold Turner)

== Production ==
Producer Charles Egelman got Steven Bochco to update the film Double Indemnity but did not substantially change it. They showed the script to Billy Wilder who gave his approval.

== Reception ==
The New York Times said the film "amounts to a flattish copy".

== See also ==
- List of American films of 1973
- ABC Movie of the Week
