= Double Indemnity =

1944 American film by Billy Wilder

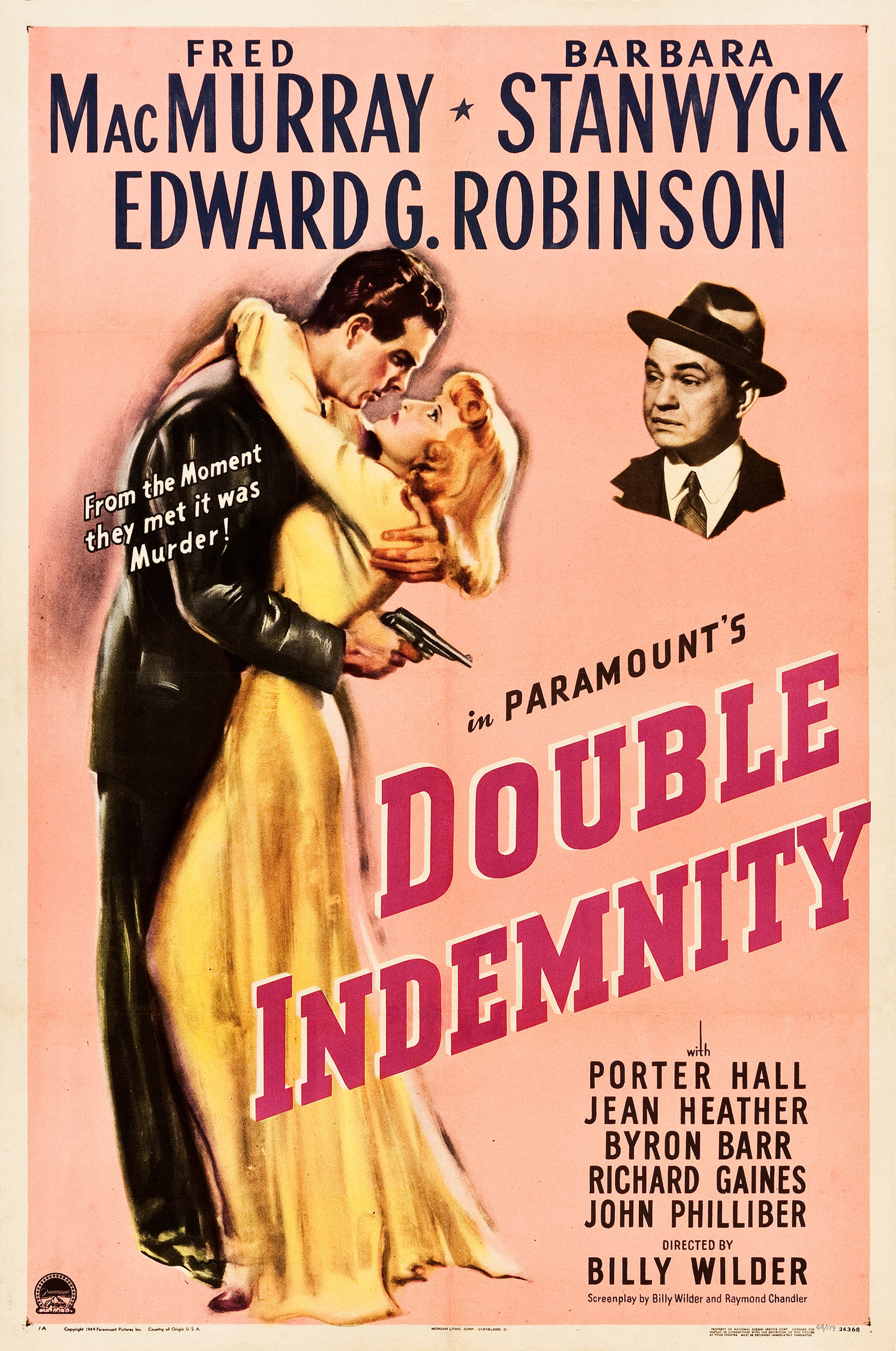
- Theatrical release poster
- Directed by: Billy Wilder
- Screenplay by: Billy Wilder; Raymond Chandler
- Based on: Double Indemnity; 1943 novel by James M. Cain
- Produced by: Joseph Sistrom (uncredited)
- Starring: Fred MacMurray; Barbara Stanwyck; Edward G. Robinson; Porter Hall; Jean Heather; Tom Powers; Byron Barr; Richard Gaines; Fortunio Bonanova; John Philliber
- Cinematography: John Seitz
- Edited by: Doane Harrison
- Music by: Miklós Rózsa
- Production company: Paramount Pictures
- Distributed by: Paramount Pictures
- Release date: July 6, 1944
- Running time: 107 minutes
- Country: United States
- Language: English
- Budget: $980,000

Double Indemnity is a 1944 American film noir directed by Billy Wilder and produced by Buddy DeSylva and Joseph Sistrom. Wilder and Raymond Chandler adapted the screenplay from James M. Cain's novel of the same name, which ran as an eight-part serial in Liberty magazine in 1936.

The film stars an insurance salesman Walter Neff (Fred MacMurray), who plots with a woman, Phyllis Dietrichson (Barbara Stanwyck), to kill her husband in order to claim a life insurance payment, arousing the suspicion of claims manager Barton Keyes (Edward G. Robinson). The title refers to a "double indemnity" clause which doubles life insurance payouts when death occurs in a statistically rare manner.

The film was nominated for seven Academy Awards. Widely regarded as a classic, Double Indemnity is often cited as having set the standard for film noir and as one of the greatest films of all time. In 1992, the U.S. Library of Congress selected it for preservation in the National Film Registry as being "culturally, historically, or aesthetically significant".

== Plot ==
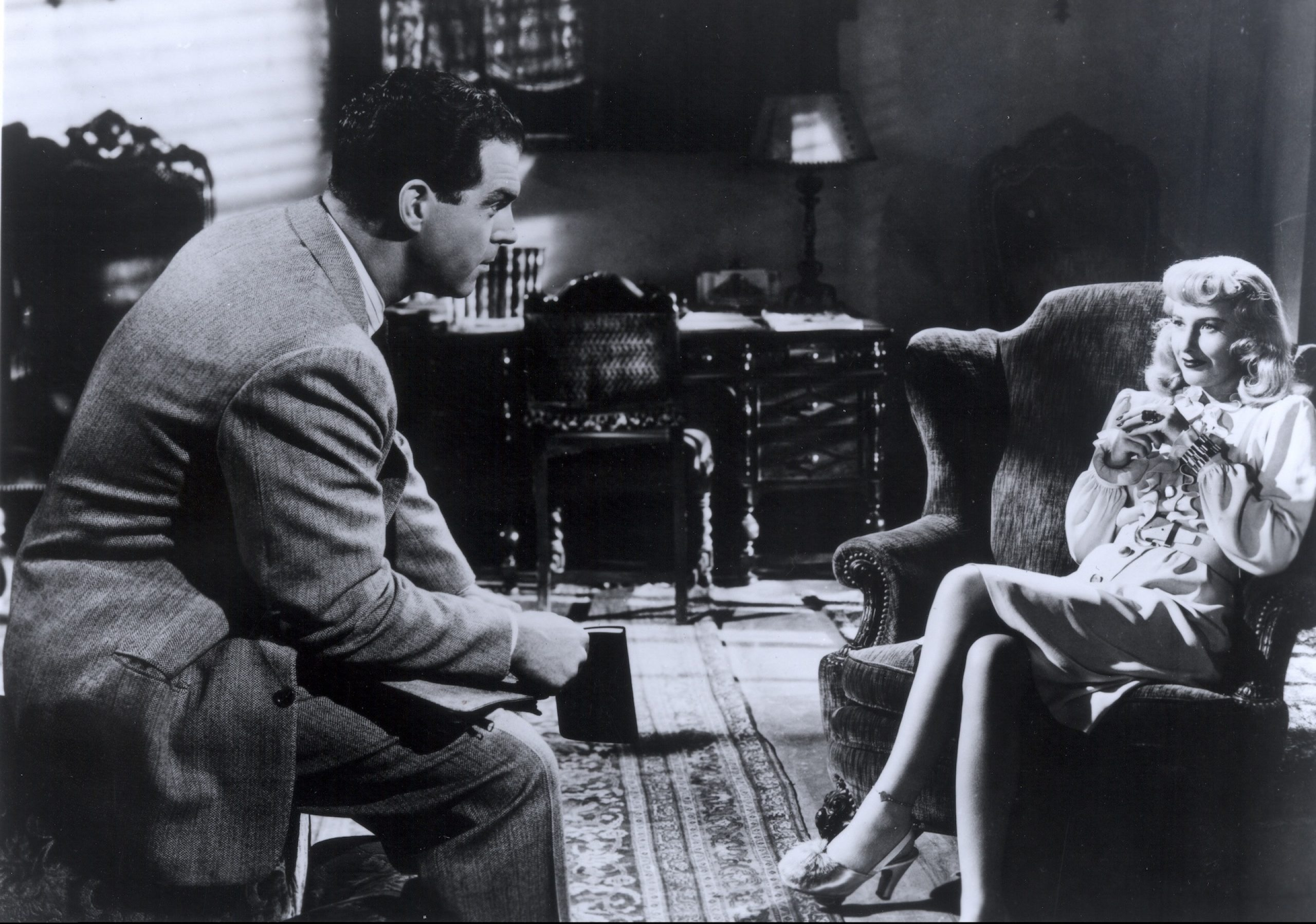
Fred MacMurray as Walter Neff and Barbara Stanwyck as Phyllis Dietrichson

Wounded from a gunshot, insurance salesman Walter Neff stumbles late at night into his empty Los Angeles office. He records a dictaphone confession for claims manager Barton Keyes.

One year earlier, Neff flirts with Phyllis Dietrichson during a house call about her husband's automobile insurance. Phyllis asks about getting a policy on Mr. Dietrichson's life without his knowledge. Deducing that she is contemplating murder, Neff wants no part of it but is fascinated with her and struggles with temptation to use his knowledge to outsmart the insurance company. Later, Phyllis visits his apartment, where Neff concocts a plan to have Dietrichson sign a life insurance policy without realizing it, murder him, and frame it as a train-related accident to trigger the policy's double indemnity clause with a higher payout.

Dietrichson signs the policy slipped in as a "copy" of his automotive insurance renewal. Before the murder can take place, Dietrichson unexpectedly breaks his leg, delaying and complicating the scheme. Neff hides in the back seat of Phyllis's car while she drives Dietrichson to a train station. Neff strangles Dietrichson, leaving the dead body in the car with Phyllis. Wearing a plaster cast, he poses as Dietrichson aboard the train. A helpful passenger almost foils the plan, requiring Neff to keep his hat pulled low and face averted. To vacate the observation car, Neff sends him on an errand for cigars. Jumping off the train at a pre-arranged spot, Neff helps Phyllis stage Dietrichson's body on the tracks.

Neff's boss believes Dietrichson's death a suicide. A dogged claims manager proud of his eye for fraud, Keyes scoffs it is statistically implausible. Keyes finds it strange that Dietrichson did not file a claim after breaking his leg. He begins to suspect that Phyllis and an accomplice murdered Dietrichson. Reasoning that Dietrichson was unaware of the policy, Keyes questions Neff, the salesman, who affirms that Dietrichson signed the policy. Based on 11 years of respect and friendship, the ordinarily suspicious Keys does not question Neff's account. Meanwhile, Neff befriends Phyllis' stepdaughter, Lola, who has a resentful boyfriend named Nino Zachetti, a medical school dropout for lack of funds. Lola tells Neff that she saw Phyllis trying on mourning clothes several days before Dietrichson's death. Lola believes Phyllis, her mother's nurse during an illness, killed her mother to marry Dietrichson. Lola now fears that Phyllis plans to kill her next for the money. Neff now begins to see the extent of Phyllis’s manipulations.

Keyes finds the witness from the train’s observation car who says that the man he saw on the train was not the Dietrichson in photos, but fails to recognize Neff, who is present. Neff warns Phyllis that pursuing the insurance claim in court risks exposing the murder. He insists that they should not see each other until the investigation ends. Nino Zachetti has been visiting Phyllis every night since the murder, and Keyes now suspects Nino is her accomplice.

Suspecting that Phyllis is now manipulating Nino to eliminate him and kill Lola, Neff confronts Phyllis and threatens to kill her. Phyllis shoots Neff, but when he comes closer and dares her to shoot again, she does not. She says that she never loved him "until a minute ago, when I couldn't fire that second shot." As they embrace, Neff shoots her twice with her gun. As Neff leaves, he sees Nino walking up to the house. Neff convinces Nino to call Lola to make up with her.

Finishing recording his confession, Neff looks up to see Keyes, summoned by a janitor who saw blood drippings. When Neff asks how long Keyes has been listening, Keyes responds, "Long enough." Asking for a head start, Neff intends to flee to Mexico, but Keyes says he won’t make it to the elevator. Neff collapses in the doorway as Keyes calls for an ambulance and the police, and the two wait for them to arrive. Chuckling ruefully, Neff says that Keyes couldn't solve this one because the culprit was too close, right across desk. Keyes responds, "Closer than that, Walter." Neff responds that he cares for Keyes too.

== Cast ==
Original trailer of the film

Trailer for the film

Credited

- Fred MacMurray as Walter Neff
- Barbara Stanwyck as Phyllis Dietrichson
- Edward G. Robinson as Barton Keyes
- Porter Hall as Jackson
- Jean Heather as Lola Dietrichson
- Tom Powers as Dietrichson
- Byron Barr as Nino Zachetti
- Richard Gaines as Norton
- Fortunio Bonanova as Sam Gorlopis, truck driver
- John Philliber as Joe Pete, elevator operator

Uncredited

- Raymond Chandler cameo as a man reading a magazine outside Keyes' office as Neff exits
- Bess Flowers as Norton's secretary
- Betty Farrington as Nettie, Dietrichson's maid
- Teala Loring as Pacific All-Risk Insurance telephone operator
- Sam McDaniel as Charlie, Garage Attendant
- Miriam Nelson as Keyes' secretary
- Douglas Spencer as Lou Schwartz, Neff's office mate
- Norma Varden as the secretary who lets Mrs. Dietrichson into the insurance office
- Constance Purdy as a customer who brushes past Phyllis and Walter in the grocery store

== Production ==
=== Background ===
James M. Cain based his novella Double Indemnity on a 1927 murder perpetrated by Ruth Snyder, married to Albert Snyder, and her lover Henry Judd Gray, who colluded with an insurance agent to obtain a $45,000 policy with a double-indemnity clause without Albert's knowledge and then have him murdered.

Cain had become a popular crime novelist following the publication of The Postman Always Rings Twice in 1934, and Double Indemnity began making the rounds in Hollywood shortly after it was serialized in Liberty magazine in 1936. Metro-Goldwyn-Mayer, Warner Bros., Paramount, 20th Century-Fox, RKO Radio Pictures, and Columbia competed over the rights to adapt Double Indemnity, but the fervor ended when Hays Office censor Joseph Breen warned in a letter to the studios:

The general low tone and sordid flavor of this story makes it, in our judgment, thoroughly unacceptable for screen presentation before mixed audiences in the theater. I am sure you will agree that it is most important...to avoid what the code calls "the hardening of audiences," especially those who are young and impressionable, to the thought and fact of crime.

In 1943, Cain's novella was anthologized with two others in Three of a Kind. Paramount's Joseph Sistrom bought the rights for $15,000, envisioning Billy Wilder as the director of an adaptation. Paramount resubmitted the novella to the Hays Office and got an identical response as seven years earlier; Paramount then submitted a partial screenplay to the Hays Office. It was approved with three objections about portraying the disposal of a corpse, the gas chamber execution scene, and the skimpiness of the towel worn by the female lead.

Cain felt Joseph Breen owed him $10,000 for vetoing the purchase of the property for $25,000 in 1936.

=== Writing ===
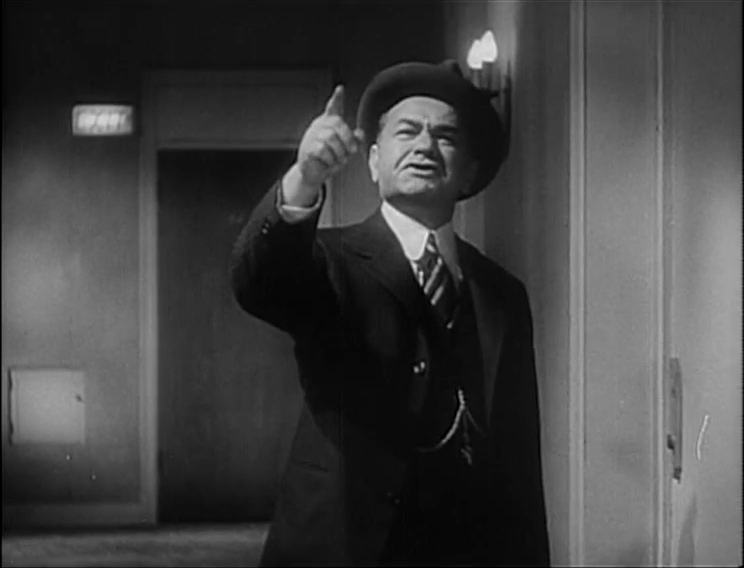
Edward G. Robinson as Barton Keyes

The restrictions imposed by the Hays Code made adapting Double Indemnity a challenge. Wilder's writing partner Charles Brackett helped with the treatment before bowing out. Wilder characterized their time apart: "1944 was 'The Year of Infidelities'...Charlie produced The Uninvited...I don't think he ever forgave me. He always thought I cheated on him with Raymond Chandler."

Cain was Wilder's first choice as a replacement for Brackett; because Cain was working at 20th Century Fox, he was never asked to work on the film. Sistrom suggested Raymond Chandler, whose 1939 novel The Big Sleep he had admired.

New to Hollywood, Chandler demanded $1,000 and at least one week to complete the screenplay, not realizing he would be paid $750 per week and that it would take fourteen. Wilder characterized Chandler's first draft as "useless camera instruction"; to teach Chandler screenwriting, Wilder gave him a copy of his script for Hold Back the Dawn. They did not get along during the next four months. Chandler quit once, submitting a long list of grievances about Wilder to Paramount. Chandler did agree to appear in the film, glancing up from a magazine as Neff walks outside Keyes' office; this is the only professional footage of him.

Chandler and Wilder made considerable changes to Cain's story. Because the Hays Code demanded criminals pay onscreen for their transgressions, the double suicide at the end of the novella was not permissible. The solution was to have the two protagonists mortally wound each other. The character of Barton Keyes was changed from a fairly clueless colleague into a mentor and antagonist to Neff.

Chandler felt that Cain's dialogue would not play well onscreen, but Wilder disagreed; after he hired contract players to read passages of Cain's text aloud, he conceded to Chandler. Chandler also scouted for locations including Jerry's Market on Melrose Avenue, where Phyllis and Walter discreetly meet to plan and discuss the murder.

Chandler was a recovering alcoholic. Wilder said that "He was in Alcoholics Anonymous...I drove him back into drinking." An embittered Chandler wrote in The Atlantic Monthly in November 1945 that "The first picture I worked on was nominated for an Academy Award...but I was not even invited to the press review held right in the studio." Wilder responded, "How could we? He was under the table drunk..." Wilder's experience with Chandler drew him to adapt Charles R. Jackson's novel The Lost Weekend, about an alcoholic writer, as his next film; Wilder wanted the film "to explain Chandler to himself." Library of America included the Double Indemnity screenplay in its second volume of Chandler's work, Later Novels and Other Writings (1995).

Cain was impressed with the screenplay, calling it "the only picture I ever saw made from my books that had things in it I wish I had thought of. Wilder's ending was much better than my ending, and his device for letting the guy tell the story by taking out the office dictating machine – I would have done it if I had thought of it."

Wilder and Chandler made several significant changes to the character of Walter beyond the name change from Huff to Neff. Literary critic Paul Skenazy has observed that the screenwriters shifted the focus of the story away from the lovers' passion and toward the conflict of loyalties it produces, particularly in Neff's fraught relationship with Keyes. The novella presents a simpler two-person dynamic between Walter and Phyllis, whereas the film transforms the story into a three-way relationship in which Neff is positioned between the two, pulled in opposite directions by desire and professional loyalty. The insurance company's name was also changed from Cain's original General Fidelity of California to the more fatalistic Pacific All-Risk, a detail critics have noted as reflecting the film's deeper pessimism about institutional life and the vulnerability of ordinary men within corporate structures.

=== Casting ===
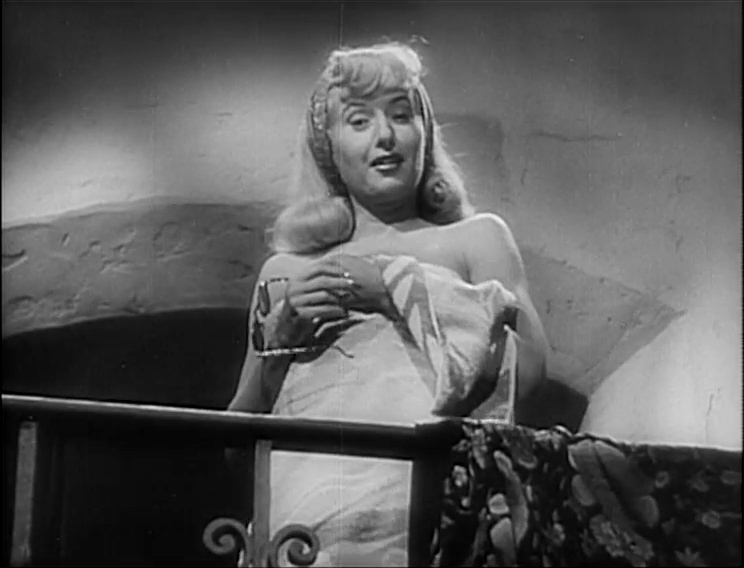
Wilder supposedly chose a bad wig for Stanwyck to underscore Phyllis's "sleazy phoniness".

Sistrom and Wilder wanted Barbara Stanwyck to play Phyllis Dietrichson. She was the highest-paid woman in America. Stanwyck was reluctant to play a femme fatale, fearing it would have an adverse effect on her career. She recalled being "a little afraid after all these years of playing heroines to go into an out-and-out killer." Wilder asked, "Well, are you a mouse or an actress?" She was grateful for his encouragement.

Alan Ladd, James Cagney, Spencer Tracy, Gregory Peck, and Fredric March all passed on the role of Neff. Wilder scraped "the bottom of the barrel" and approached George Raft. Since Raft did not read scripts, Wilder described the plot. Raft interrupted, "Let's get to the lapel bit...when the guy flashes his lapel, you see his badge, you know he's a detective." Since Neff was not a cop, Raft turned the part down. This was the last in a series of films Raft declined which turned out to be classics. Wilder realized the part needed someone who could play a cynic and a nice guy simultaneously.

Fred MacMurray was accustomed to playing "happy-go-lucky good guys" in light comedies. In 1943, he was the highest-paid actor in Hollywood. When Wilder approached him about the role, MacMurray said, "You're making the mistake of your life!" He felt he lacked the skill for a serious part, but Wilder pestered the actor until he relented. MacMurray felt Paramount would never let him play a "wrong" role, because the studio carefully crafted his image. Paramount let him take the unsavory role, hoping to teach him a lesson during negotiations for his contract renewal. MacMurray's success in the role came as a surprise to both him and Paramount; he later recalled that he "never dreamed it would be the best picture [he] ever made."

Edward G. Robinson was reluctant to step down to third billing as Barton Keyes, reflecting that "At my age, it was time to begin thinking of character roles, to slide into middle and old age with the same grace as that marvelous actor Lewis Stone". Robinson agreed to take the role in part because he would receive the same salary as the two leads for fewer shooting days.

Dick Powell was the only actor who actively sought the role of Neff, but Wilder declined because he did not want to cast a singer. Wilder ultimately concluded that the part required someone who could simultaneously play a cynic and a likable everyman, a quality he identified in MacMurray's established screen persona. The British Film Institute has noted that it was precisely MacMurray's affability that made him such a convincing Neff, arguing that Walter is not innately a bad person but an ordinary man lured into catastrophic decisions, and that an undercurrent of self-disgust runs throughout MacMurray's portrayal. James M. Cain, in a letter to MacMurray following the film's release, wrote that the way MacMurray found tragedy in Neff's shallow and commonplace character would remain with him for a long time.

=== Filming ===
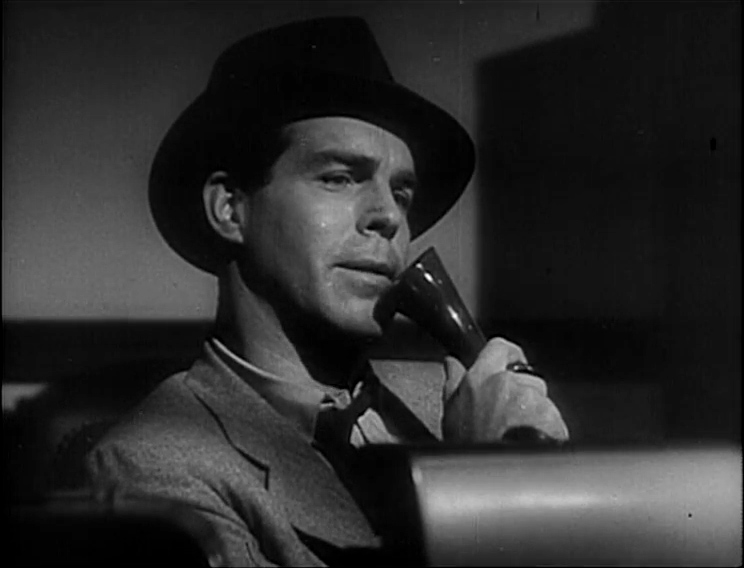
Neff confesses into a Dictaphone.

Filming ran from September 27 to November 24, 1943. John F. Seitz was the premier director of photography at Paramount, having worked since the silent era. Seitz was nominated for an Academy Award for Wilder's Five Graves to Cairo (1943). The director praised Seitz's willingness to experiment. They gave the film a look reminiscent of German expressionist cinema, with dramatic deployment of light and shadows. Wilder recalled, "Sometimes the rushes were so dark that you couldn't see anything. He went to the limits of what could be done." Bright Southern California exteriors contrasted with gloomy interiors to suggest what lurked beneath the facade. The effect was heightened by dirtying up the set with overturned ashtrays and blowing aluminum particles into the air to simulate dust.

Use of "venetian blind" lighting became a stock-in-trade film noir look.

Seitz used "Venetian blind" lighting to simulate prison bars trapping the characters. Barbara Stanwyck reflected that "the way those sets were lit, the house, Walter's apartment, those dark shadows, those slices of harsh light at strange angles – all that helped my performance. The way Billy staged it and John Seitz lit it, it was all one sensational mood."

For Neff's office at Pacific All Risk, Wilder and set designer Hal Pereira copied the Paramount headquarters in New York City as an inside joke at the studio's expense.

Stanwyck wears a blonde wig "to complement her anklet...and to make her look as sleazy as possible." Paramount production head Buddy DeSylva did not approve of the wig, remarking that "We hired Barbara Stanwyck, and here we get George Washington." In response, Wilder insisted that the wig was "meant to show that she's a phony character and that all of her emotions are fraudulent". A week into filming, Wilder came to consider the wig a mistake, but too much of the film had been shot to remove it; he later referred to the use of the wig as the biggest mistake of his career.

Edith Head designed Barbara Stanwyck's costumes. Her designs focus on bias-cut gowns, blouses with wide sleeves, and the waistline. Shoulder pads were the style of the 1940s, but they also accentuated the femme fatale's power. In Stanwyck's death scene, her wig and white jumpsuit contrast with Neff's dark suit, creating a chiaroscuro effect.

When Phyllis and Walter dump the corpse on the tracks, they were supposed to get in their car and drive away. The crew shot the scene as written. As Wilder left the exterior location, however, his car would not start. He ordered the crew back and reshot the scene with Phyllis struggling to start her car. Wilder insisted MacMurray turn the ignition so slowly that the actor protested.

Wilder managed to bring the whole production in under budget at $927,262 despite $370,000 in salaries for just four people: $100,000 each for MacMurray, Stanwyck, and Robinson; $44,000 for Wilder's writing plus $26,000 for his directing. Wilder considered Double Indemnity his best film because it had so few scripting and shooting errors. He marked Cain's praise for Double Indemnity and Agatha Christie's praise for his adaptation of Witness for the Prosecution as two high points in his career.

=== Original ending ===
The screenplay ends with Keyes watching Neff's execution in the gas chamber. Wilder shot the scene from Neff's perspective, looking out of the gas chamber at Keyes. Wilder shot for five days and spent $150,000 on the scene, which he felt was one of the best he ever directed. Production stills of this scene exist, and the footage may still be in Paramount's vaults.

However, the director ultimately decided to end the film with Keyes and Neff in their office, because "You couldn't have a more meaningful scene between two men...The story was between the two guys." Chandler objected to the change. Joseph Breen felt the execution was "unduly gruesome", and its removal settled his office's last issue with the film.

== Soundtrack ==
The Conspiracy
Excerpt from Miklós Rózsa's score.

Wilder liked Miklós Rózsa's work on Five Graves to Cairo and hired him to score Double Indemnity. Wilder suggested a restless string figure to reflect the conspiratorial activities of Walter and Phyllis. He had in mind the opening of Franz Schubert's Unfinished Symphony, which is heard onscreen in the scene at the Hollywood Bowl. Rózsa liked the idea, and Wilder was enthusiastic about the score as it took shape.

Paramount's music director Louis Lipstone reprimanded Rózsa for writing "Carnegie Hall music"; Rózsa mistook this as a compliment. Lipstone suggested he watch Madame Curie to learn how to properly score a film. He felt Rózsa's music was more appropriate for The Battle of Russia. He expected Paramount's artistic director Buddy DeSylva to agree, but when DeSylva heard the music, his only note was that there should be more of it. The score was nominated for an Academy Award, and the success brought Rózsa more studio work.

=== Locations ===
Exterior shots of the Dietrichson house in the film were shot at a Spanish Colonial Revival house on 6301 Quebec Drive in Beachwood Canyon. The production team copied the interior of the house, including the spiral staircase, on a Paramount soundstage.

The Southern Pacific Railroad station in Burbank was used in the film with a prop sign for Glendale; the site now hosts Metrolink's Downtown Burbank station, which also hosts limited Pacific Surfliner service operated by Amtrak. Walter Neff's apartment building was located at 1825 North Kingsley Drive in Hollywood, and the Hollywood & Western Building also appears in the film.

== Release ==
Double Indemnity's first theatrical engagement was at the Keith's in Baltimore on July 3, 1944; the film opened nationwide three days later. It was an immediate hit with audiences despite a campaign against the film by singer Kate Smith. James M. Cain recalled that "there was a little trouble caused by this fat girl, Kate Smith, who carried on a propaganda asking people to stay away from the picture. Her advertisement probably put a million dollars on its gross."

When Double Indemnity was released, David O. Selznick was promoting Since You Went Away with trade magazine ads that claimed its title had become "the four most important words uttered in motion picture history since Gone with the Wind." Wilder riposted with an ad of his own claiming that "Double Indemnity" were the two most important words uttered in motion picture history since Broken Blossoms. Selznick was not amused, and threatened to stop advertising in any of the trades if they continued to run Wilder's ads.

== Reception ==
=== Reviews ===
Contemporary reviews of the film were largely positive, though its content made some uncomfortable. While some critics found the story implausible and disturbing, others praised it as an original thriller. In The New York Times, Bosley Crowther called the picture "Steadily diverting, despite its monotonous pace and length." He complained that the two lead characters "lack the attractiveness to render their fate of emotional consequence", but also felt the movie possessed a "realism reminiscent of the bite of past French films".

Film critic and author James Agee reviewed it in 1944: "In many ways Double Indemnity is really quite a gratifying and even a good movie, essentially cheap I will grant, but smart and crisp and cruel ... " New York Herald Tribune's Howard Barnes wrote it was "one of the most vital and arresting films of the year", praising Wilder's "magnificent direction and a whale of a script". Variety felt it "sets a new standard for screen treatment in its category".

Radio host and Hearst paper columnist Louella Parsons said, "Double Indemnity is the finest picture of its kind ever made, and I make that flat statement without any fear of getting indigestion later from eating my words."

The Brooklyn Eagle was highly complimentary, "Besides MacMurray, who shows up as a top flight dramatic actor in a role that is a new type for him, and Miss Stanwyck, who has never given a more striking performance, 'Double Indemnity' has a third standout star, Edward G. Robinson, in his best role in many a film....By the way, there's no need to warn the teenagers away from this one; they wouldn't skip it in any case, and besides, 'Double Indemnity' makes it beautifully clear that murder doesn't pay—and certainly the insurance company doesn't, without sharp investigation."

In the Los Angeles Times, Philip K. Scheur ranked it with The Human Comedy, The Maltese Falcon, and Citizen Kane as Hollywood trailblazers. Alfred Hitchcock wrote to Wilder saying, "Since Double Indemnity, the two most important words in motion pictures are 'Billy' and 'Wilder'."

The film's critical reputation has only grown over the years. In 1977, Leslie Halliwell raved, "Brilliantly filmed and incisively written, perfectly capturing the decayed Los Angeles atmosphere of a Chandler novel, but using a simpler story and more substantial characters." In a 1998 review for his Great Movies canon, Roger Ebert wrote, "The photography by John F. Seitz helped develop the noir style of sharp-edged shadows and shots, strange angles and lonely Edward Hopper settings." Pauline Kael stated: "Every turn and twist is exactly calculated and achieves its effect with the simplest of means; this shrewd, smoothly tawdry thriller is one of the high points of 40s films."

In Empire, Rob Fraser enthused, "Film noir at its finest, a template of the genre, etc. Billy Wilder in full swing, Barbara Stanwyck's finest hour, and Fred MacMurray makes a great chump."

On the review aggregator website Rotten Tomatoes, 97% of 110 critics' reviews of the film are positive. The website's consensus reads: "A dark, tautly constructed adaptation of James M. Cain's novel -- penned by Billy Wilder and Raymond Chandler -- Double Indemnity continues to set the standard for the best in Hollywood film noir." On Metacritic, the film has a weighted average score of 95 out of 100 based on 18 critics, which the site labels as "universal acclaim".

== Accolades ==
Award	Category	Nominee(s)	Result	Ref.
Academy Awards	Best Motion Picture	Paramount Pictures	Nominated	
Academy Awards	Best Director	Billy Wilder	Nominated	
Academy Awards	Best Actress	Barbara Stanwyck	Nominated	
Academy Awards	Best Screenplay	Billy Wilder and Raymond Chandler	Nominated	
Academy Awards	Best Cinematography – Black and White	John F. Seitz	Nominated	
Academy Awards	Best Scoring of a Dramatic or Comedy Picture	Miklós Rózsa	Nominated	
Academy Awards	Best Sound Recording	Loren Ryder	Nominated	
National Film Preservation Board	National Film Registry		Inducted	
New York Film Critics Circle Awards	Best Director	Billy Wilder	Nominated	
New York Film Critics Circle Awards	Best Actress	Barbara Stanwyck	Nominated	
Online Film & Television Association Awards	Film Hall of Fame: Productions		Inducted	

Filmed and released during the dark days of World War II, the film was not popular with the Academy. Wilder went to the awards ceremony expecting to win. The studio had been backing its other big hit of the year, Leo McCarey's Going My Way, and their employees were expected to vote for the studio favorite. As Double Indemnity kept losing during the awards show, it became evident that there would be a Going My Way sweep. When McCarey was named Best Director, a bitter Wilder tripped him on his way to accept the award. After the ceremony, Wilder yelled so everyone could hear him, "What the hell does the Academy Award mean, for God's sake? After all – Luise Rainer won it two times. Luise Rainer!"

== Legacy ==
In 1992, the U.S. Library of Congress selected Double Indemnity for preservation in the National Film Registry as being "culturally, historically, or aesthetically significant".

American Film Institute included the film on several lists:

- 1998: AFI's 100 Years ... 100 Movies, #38
- 2001: AFI's 100 Years ... 100 Thrills, #24
- 2002: AFI's 100 Years ... 100 Passions, #84
- 2003: AFI's 100 Years ... 100 Heroes and Villains, Phyllis Dietrichson – #8 Villain
- 2007: AFI's 100 Years ... 100 Movies (10th Anniversary Edition), #29

Double Indemnity is often referred to as one of the greatest films of all time:

- Time Out: Top 100 films of all time, #43 (1998).
- Entertainment Weekly: 100 Greatest Movies of All Time, #50 (1999).
- National Society of Film Critics: "Top 100 Essential Films of All Time" (2002).
- Time: All-Time 100 best movies (2005).
- Writers Guild of America: Greatest Screenplays, #26.
- BBC: "100 Greatest American Films", #35 (2015).
- BFI: "100 essential thrillers" (2017)
- Variety: "The 100 Greatest Movies of All Time" (2022).
- Time Out: "100 Best Movies of All Time That You Should Watch Immediately" (2023).
- Entertainment Weekly: "The 40 best thriller movies of all time", #17 (2025).
- The Sight and Sound Greatest Films of All Time 2022: #196

The February 2020 issue of New York Magazine selected Double Indemnity as among "The Best Movies That Lost Best Picture at the Oscars." Stephen King named it one of his ten favorite movies.

== Film noir ==
Double Indemnity is a seminal example of film noir. It is often compared with Wilder's other acclaimed film noir Sunset Boulevard (1950). Film scholar Robert Sklar explains, "[T]he unusual juxtaposition of temporalities gives the spectator a premonition of what will occur/has occurred in the flashback story...Besides Double Indemnity and Detour, voice-over is a key aspect of Mildred Pierce, Gilda, The Lady from Shanghai, and Out of the Past...as well as many others." Critic and writer Wendy Lesser notes that the narrator of Sunset Boulevard is dead before he begins narrating, but in Double Indemnity, "the voice-over has a different meaning. It is not the voice of a dead man...it is...the voice of an already doomed man."

Wilder stated that "I never heard that expression film noir when I made Double Indemnity...I just made pictures I would have liked to see. When I was lucky, it coincided with the taste of the audience. With Double Indemnity, I was lucky."

Eddie Muller listed it as one of his Top 25 Noir Films.

== Walter Neff and the noir anti-hero ==
Walter Neff, portrayed by Fred MacMurray, is frequently identified by critics as a defining example of the film noir protagonist. Unlike traditional Hollywood heroes, Neff is characterized by moral weakness, susceptibility to desire, and a sense of inevitability that aligns him with broader noir themes of fatalism and self-destruction. His first-person narration, delivered through a Dictaphone confession, frames the narrative as a retrospective account of a doomed man and reinforces the sense that his fate is predetermined.

Scholarly analysis has focused on Neff's relationship to masculinity and power. Critics have argued that despite his outward confidence as an insurance salesman, Neff is ultimately defined by passivity and vulnerability, particularly in his relationship with Phyllis Dietrichson. His participation in the murder scheme has been interpreted not only as an act of desire, but also as an attempt to assert control within a corporate and social structure that otherwise limits him.

Neff's role within the insurance company further situates him within critiques of capitalism often associated with film noir. His knowledge of policy structures allows him to manipulate the system, but also implicates him more deeply in its logic. Some critics suggest that his crime represents a distorted extension of his professional role, in which risk calculation and profit become intertwined with violence.

More recent theoretical approaches have situated Neff within frameworks of modern subjectivity. Literary scholar David R. Shumway argues that Neff's Dictaphone narration reflects the logic of disciplinary systems, in which confession produces knowledge about the individual rather than simply expressing guilt, positioning Neff as a modern subject shaped by institutional structures of surveillance and control.

Critics have also emphasized the emotional centrality of Neff's relationship with claims manager Barton Keyes, played by Edward G. Robinson. Rather than his romantic involvement with Phyllis, this relationship has been described as the film's moral and emotional core. Film critic Roger Ebert observed that recurring gestures between the two characters, such as Neff lighting Keyes's cigars, reinforce their bond and give added weight to the film's conclusion.

== Adaptations ==
The Screen Guild Theater twice adapted Double Indemnity as a radio drama. Fred MacMurray and Barbara Stanwyck reprised their roles in the first broadcast on March 5, 1945. Stanwyck appeared again on the February 16, 1950 version, this time opposite Robert Taylor.

On October 15, 1948, Ford Theatre produced another radio adaptation with Burt Lancaster and Joan Bennett. Lux Radio Theater broadcast one with MacMurray and Stanwyck on October 30, 1950.

The movie was remade as a television film, with direction by Jack Smight and a teleplay adapted by Steven Bochco. It aired on ABC on October 13, 1973.

== Imitators ==
After the success of Double Indemnity, imitators were rampant. In 1945, Producers Releasing Corporation, one of the B movie studios of Hollywood's Poverty Row, financed Single Indemnity starring Ann Savage and Hugh Beaumont. Marketed as Apology for Murder, Paramount was not fooled by the title change and obtained an injunction against the film's release that still remains in effect.

So many imitations flooded the market that Cain believed he deserved credit and remuneration. Cain was also disaffected about the extortionate practices of the film studios which could pay writers thousands of dollars for a copyright and earn millions from the resulting movie. He led a movement within the Screen Writers Guild to create the American Author's Authority, a union that would own its members' works, negotiate better subsidiary deals, and protect against copyright infringement. The AAA never got off the ground, partially due to the growing momentum of the Red Scare.

== See also ==
- List of American films of 1944
- Button, Button (Matheson short story) – 1970 short story by Richard Matheson
