= Double Indemnity (novel) =

Novel by James M. Cain

- Cover of the first separate edition (Avon Books)
- Author: James M. Cain
- Language: English
- Genre: Crime; Noir; Psychological thriller
- Publication date: 1936 (serial); 1943 (novel)
- Publication place: United States
- Media type: Print (Hardback & Paperback)

Double Indemnity is a 1943 crime novel by American journalist-turned-novelist James M. Cain. It was first published in Liberty magazine in 1936 as an eight part serial, and later republished as one of "three long short tales" in the collection Three of a Kind.

The novel is based on the 1927 murder of Albert Snyder of the New York City borough of Queens. Cain attended the trial while working as a journalist in New York.

The novel served as the basis for the film of the same name in 1944, adapted for the screen by the novelist Raymond Chandler and directed by Billy Wilder, as well as numerous remakes in different forms.

== Plot summary ==
Walter Huff, a bachelor insurance agent, falls for the married Phyllis Nirdlinger, who consults him about accident insurance for her unsuspecting husband. In spite of his instinctual decency, and intrigued by the challenge of committing the perfect murder, Walter is seduced into helping the femme fatale do away with her husband for the insurance money. Killing him at night, they place the body on railroad tracks to look as if he had fallen from the observation platform of a train. Huff's company are suspicious and delay payment, keeping Phyllis and Walter under surveillance so that they dare not meet. Without the money he had killed for and without the woman he wanted, Walter decides to keep her quiet by murdering her as well, but she forestalls him and shoots him in the chest. Hospitalized, he confesses the plot to Barton Keyes, the company's claims manager, who arranges for him to escape justice by taking a steamship for Mexico. Also on the ship is Phyllis; agreeing that “there’s nothing ahead of us”, they decide to end it all by jumping off the stern into shark infested waters.

== Publication history ==
In the autumn of 1934, shortly after the release of his first novel The Postman Always Rings Twice, Cain and wife Elina Tyszecka purchased a home in the Southern California city of Beverly Hills. Anticipating work as a screenplay writer in Hollywood, Cain decided to write a serial to help pay for the expensive property. The plot for Double Indemnity was derived from two independent sources:

1) An incident shared with him by Arthur Krock, assistant publisher when Cain worked at the New York World in 1924, intrigued him: A printer at the Louisville Courier-Journal had gratuitously altered the word “TUCK” in a routine advertisement for ladies' underwear to form a vulgar four-letter word. The ad was published in the next edition. When Krock confronted the guilty employee, he responded: “Mr. Krock, you do nothing your whole life but watch for something like that happening…and then you catch yourself watching for chances to do it…” Cain was fascinated with the dramatic possibilities implicit in this reckless and self-destructive act.

2) Cain was familiar with aspects of the insurance business, having sold insurance in Washington D. C. at the age of twenty-two. He obtained additional insights into how fraud was committed from his father who worked for an insurance company. Cain was impressed by comments from an auto insurance salesman he had consulted when researching details for The Postman Always Rings Twice in 1933. They assured him that “the big crime mysteries in this country are locked up in insurance company files.” With a story and a dramatic element in mind, Cain informed his agent Edith Haggard that he would model the style of the serial on The Postman Always Rings Twice:

It will be told almost in exactly the same style as my Postman book and, as a murder story, have the novelty that the insurance [investigator] who solves it never relies on any clues at all, in fact never even gets a clue. His weapons are the big human factors that people always overlook when they try to pull something smart…

The novel was completed in late summer 1935, with the title Double Indemnity provided by Cain’s agent James Geller. When Haggard’s effort to sell the serial to Redbook failed and book publisher Alfred A. Knopf showed no interest, she took manuscripts to several Hollywood studios, generating tremendous enthusiasm. However, when the Hays Office examined the work for film adaption, they emphatically rejected it. Cain considered rewriting the serial, but Haggard had succeeded in selling Double Indemnity to Liberty magazine for $5000, and it was published in early 1936.

== Adaptations ==
=== 1944 film ===
Directed by Billy Wilder with a screenplay by Raymond Chandler, Double Indemnity was “the first significant film created from a Cain book, and it remains the best.”

In 1935, when Liberty magazine was preparing to release Double Indemnity by installments, M-G-M studios requested the Hays Office evaluate the piece for film adaptation. Joseph Breen emphatically condemned the depictions of murder and adultery, killing any Hollywood interest in the novel.

With the 1943 inclusion of Double Indemnity in Three of a Kind, a hard-bound collection of Cain novellas, interest in the work was revived. Cain’s agent H. N. Swanson brought the work to the attention of Austro-Hungarian writer-director Billy Wilder, and Wilder instantly acquired the rights for $15,000. Cain was chagrined that the piece, valued at 25,000 in 1935, was still discounted by the waning censorship risks imposed by the Hays Office. Initially, Wilder enlisted Cain to help write the film script. His dialogue, which was pitched to his literary forms, did not translate well to film. Wilder hired Raymond Chandler, author of The Big Sleep, and he and Wilder completed the screenplay. The scenario and story remained “as close as possible to the original story” but gave centrality to the relationship between Neff and Keyes. Literary critic Paul Skenazy observes that “Wilder and Chandler shift the focus from the lovers’ passion to the cost of that passion, and from Neff’s relationship with Phylis to the conflict of loyalties brought on by Phylis.” The script was approved by Joseph Breen.

Cain was deeply gratified at the critical and commercial success of the Double Indemnity film, as well as the lead performances. He wrote to actor Barbara Stanwyck, who played Phyllis Nirdlinger [Phyllis Dietrichson in the film version]:

it is a very creepy sensation to see a character imagined by yourself step in front of your eyes exactly as you imagined her.

To actor Fred MacMurray, who played Walter Huff [Walter Neff in the film version], Cain wrote:

The way you found tragedy in his shallow, commonplace, smart-cracking skull will remain with me for a long time and, indeed, reinforce an aesthetic viewpoint that many quarrel with; for if I have any gift, it is to take such people and show that they can suffer as profoundly as anybody else…

=== Radio ===
The Screen Guild Theater twice adapted Double Indemnity as a radio drama. Fred MacMurray and Barbara Stanwyck reprised their roles in the first broadcast on March 5, 1945. Stanwyck appeared again on the February 16, 1950 version, this time opposite Robert Taylor.

On October 15, 1948, Ford Theatre produced another radio adaptation with Burt Lancaster and Joan Bennett and the October 30, 1950 broadcast of Lux Radio Theater with MacMurray and Stanwyck.

=== 1973 TV film ===
The film was remade in 1973 as a television film starring Richard Crenna. This credits for this version state that it is based on the original novel by James M. Cain as well as the screenplay for the 1944 film by Billy Wilder and Raymond Chandler.

=== 2011 stage play ===
A stage adaptation by David Pichette and R. Hamilton Wright, directed by Kurt Beattie, opened at ACT Theatre in Seattle on October 27, 2011. The same production moved to the San Jose Repertory Theatre and opened on January 18, 2012.

=== 2026 stage play ===
A stage adaptation by Tom Holloway, directed by Oscar Toeman, and starring Mischa Barton as Phyllis opens at the Devonshire Park Theatre, Eastbourne, before a UK and Ireland tour.
