= Double indemnity =

Insurance clause

Double indemnity is a clause or provision in a life insurance policy whereby the company agrees to pay the stated multiple (e.g., double, triple) of the face amount in the contract in cases of death caused by accidental means. This includes murder by a person other than, and not in collusion with, the beneficiary of the insurance policy, and most accidental deaths. It excludes suicide, and deaths caused by the insured person's own gross negligence, as well as natural causes.

In 2006, 5.01% of all deaths in the United States were declared accidental. For this reason, double-indemnity clauses are usually relatively inexpensive and often aggressively marketed, especially to people over 45. People with dangerous jobs, such as heavy construction, as well as children, are not generally eligible for multiple-indemnity coverage.
