= The Gang Does a Clip Show =

- It's Always Sunny in Philadelphia episode
- Episode no.: Season 13; Episode 7
- Directed by: Todd Biermann
- Written by: Dannah Phirman; Danielle Schneider
- Cinematography by: John Tanzer
- Editing by: Tim Roche
- Production code: XIP13008
- Original air date: October 17, 2018
- Running time: 22 minutes

Guest appearances
- Mary Elizabeth Ellis as The Waitress; Peter Mackenzie as Doctor

Episode chronology
← Previous "The Gang Solves the Bathroom Problem"	Next → "Charlie's Home Alone"
- It's Always Sunny in Philadelphia season 13

"The Gang Does a Clip Show" is the seventh episode of the thirteenth season of the American television sitcom It's Always Sunny in Philadelphia. It is the 141st overall episode of the series, and was written by co-executive producers Dannah Phirman and Danielle Schneider, and directed by supervising producer Todd Biermann. It originally aired on FXX on October 17, 2018.

The series follows "The Gang", a group of five misfit friends: twins Dennis and Deandra "(Sweet) Dee" Reynolds, their friends Charlie Kelly and Ronald "Mac" McDonald, and Frank Reynolds, Dennis' and Dee's legal father. The Gang runs the fictional Paddy's Pub, an unsuccessful Irish bar in South Philadelphia. In the episode, while waiting for their phones to download software updates, the Gang reminisces about their past adventures in clip-show style, but their memories become warped, as does time itself.

== Plot ==
Mac (Rob McElhenney) suggests that The Gang should remember some memories from their pasts while they wait for their phones to download a software update. Frank (Danny DeVito) starts, remembering the time he sewed himself into a couch on Christmas. (Note: As seen in "A Very Sunny Christmas".) Dee (Kaitlin Olson) then does racist caricatures and trips over, hitting her head. The Gang then remembers a compilation of all the times Dee has gotten hurt. Mac then remembers all the "classic memories", including when Charlie (Charlie Day) bit a Santa impersonator, when Charlie cuts the brakes to their van, which leads to The Gang blowing up someone's car, (Note: As seen in "The Gang Solves the Gas Crisis".) when Charlie vomits fake blood on his date, (Note: As seen in "Frank's Pretty Woman".) when Dennis (Glenn Howerton) talks to Mac about the implications of taking a girl on a boat to sleep with him, (Note: As seen in "The Gang Buys a Boat".) when Dee threatens to punch Charlie, (Note: As seen in "Hundred Dollar Baby".) when Dennis, Mac and Charlie dress up like eagles before a wrestling match, (Note: As seen in "The Gang Wrestles for the Troops".) when Mac and Charlie attempt to fake their own deaths, (Note: As seen in "Mac and Charlie Die".) when The Gang imagines themselves performing a choreographed dance at their high school reunion (Note: As seen in "The High School Reunion Part 2: The Gang's Revenge".) and when Dennis temporarily leaves Paddy's. (Note: As seen in "Dennis' Double Life".)

In the latter memory, Mac misremembers turning off the lights to the bar when Dennis leaves, and Dennis corrects him, saying he actually turned the lights off, but his memory is hijacked by Dee and Charlie, who both claim to have turned the lights off. Charlie then remembers his musical, "The Nightman Cometh", but in a different language. Mac then suggests to remember all the times someone didn't know what was happening, including when Dee fell for a pyramid scheme (Note: As seen in "Mac and Dennis Buy a Timeshare".) and when Charlie received a placebo effect from pills he was told would make him smarter. (Note: As seen in "Flowers for Charlie".) Dee then remembers an episode of Seinfeld, "The Contest", as real life, where Dennis and Mac are Jerry, Frank is George, Dee is Elaine and Charlie is Kramer. Dennis corrects The Gang, saying that their contest was to see who could masturbate the most, which caused them to be hospitalized.

Dennis explains that misremembering can change reality, so Charlie fake remembers him and The Waitress (Mary Elizabeth Ellis) having sex, and that she's pregnant with his child. After Charlie watched himself in his fake memory, he alters reality so that he and The Waitress really did have a child, but Dennis soon works out that they are in Frank's fake memory and that it wasn't real. The Gang thinks they've returned to reality, but Dennis sees that Dee's cut on her head from when she fell is gone, and that they are in someone's memory. The Gang realizes that they are in Dennis' memory, and they return to reality. Dennis suggests to test whether they're really in reality by spinning a spinning top like in Inception. Their phones finish updating as a second Charlie opens the door to the pub, watching in, and the top continues spinning, implying they are still in a memory.

== Production ==
The episode was directed by supervising producer Todd Biermann, and was written by co-executive producers and writing duo Dannah Phirman and Danielle Schneider.

== Reception ==
The episode was watched by 298,000 viewers on its initial airing. It received positive reviews, with Decider calling it "the Funniest Episode the Show Has Ever Produced". The A.V. Club gave the episode a B− ranking, saying the writers "attempt to monkey with its formula".
