= It's Always Sunny in Philadelphia season 4 =

2008 season of American television series

It's Always Sunny in Philadelphia
- Season 4
- DVD cover
- Starring: Charlie Day; Glenn Howerton; Rob McElhenney; Kaitlin Olson; Danny DeVito
- No. of episodes: 13

Release
- Original network: FX
- Original release: September 18 – November 20, 2008

Season chronology
- ← Previous; Season 3 Next → Season 5

The fourth season of the American television sitcom series It's Always Sunny in Philadelphia premiered on FX on September 18, 2008. The season contains 13 episodes and concluded airing on November 20, 2008.

== Cast ==
=== Main cast ===
- Charlie Day as Charlie Kelly
- Glenn Howerton as Dennis Reynolds
- Rob McElhenney as Mac
- Kaitlin Olson as Deandra "Dee" Reynolds
- Danny DeVito as Frank Reynolds

=== Recurring cast ===
- Mary Elizabeth Ellis as The Waitress
- David Hornsby as Cricket / Colonel Cricket
- Artemis Pebdani as Artemis

=== Guest stars ===
- Jonathan Spencer as Morgue Worker
- Zachary Knighton as Random Guy
- Marlene Mc'Cohen as Dominique
- Jennifer Birmingham as Rachelle
- T.J. Hoban as Rex
- Suzanne Quast as Tabitha
- Gregory Scott Cummins as Luther Mac
- Geoff Pierson as Warden
- Sandy Martin as Mrs. Mac
- Keir O'Donnell as Jan
- Lynne Marie Stewart as Bonnie Kelly
- Fran Kranz as College Student
- Fisher Stevens as Korman
- Rizwan Manji as Mehar
- Rob Thomas as himself
- Sinbad as himself
- Lisa Locicero as Philadelphia Soul Executive
- Judi Barton as Nurse
- Michael Naughton as HR Director
- Pat Crawford Brown as Woman-Historical Society
- Gabriela Moreno as Daughter Juarez
- Alejandro Patino as Father Juarez
- Laura Patricia Vega as Mother Juarez
- Retta as Hardware Store Clerk
- Mae Laborde as Gladys

== Episodes ==
| No. overall | No. in season | Title | Directed by | Written by | Original release date | Prod. code | US viewers (millions) |
|---|---|---|---|---|---|---|---|
| 33 | 1 | "Mac and Dennis: Manhunters" | Fred Savage | Charlie Day & Jordan Young & Elijah Aron | September 18, 2008 | IP04002 | 1.73 |
Charlie and Dee are constantly stealing expensive meat from Frank, so he tells them that the last steak they had, which they found the most delicious of all, was human meat. Believing they have become cannibals, Charlie and Dee decide they have to sample human meat to be sure. This leads them to the morgue, and then to kidnap a homeless man. Meanwhile, Mac and Dennis go after the most dangerous prey of all—man—by hunting Cricket. Cricket proves difficult to capture thanks to new, state-funded bionic legs, but the promise of tea-bagging him keeps them in the hunt. Frank reveals that the meat Charlie and Dee ate was in fact rancid raccoon meat.
| 34 | 2 | "The Gang Solves the Gas Crisis" | Matt Shakman | Charlie Day & Sonny Lee & Patrick Walsh | September 18, 2008 | IP04009 | 1.60 |
To profit from high gas prices, Mac, Dennis, and Charlie fill barrels of gasoline and attempt to sell them door-to-door. Meanwhile, Dee and Frank plot to brand Bruce Mathis (Dennis and Dee's biological father) as a terrorist after learning that he's donating Barbara's inheritance money to a Muslim community center, but instead end up ruining a stranger's life.
| 35 | 3 | "America's Next Top Paddy's Billboard Model Contest" | Fred Savage | Charlie Day & Rob McElhenney & Adam Stein | September 25, 2008 | IP04006 | 1.44 |
Mac and Frank hold a contest where the winner will be the billboard model for Paddy's Pub, and Dennis competes to prove he is still a "beefcake". Charlie and Dee try to create a viral video about Paddy's for YouTube, but Dee's increasingly racist "characters" get them in trouble.
| 36 | 4 | "Mac's Banging the Waitress" | Matt Shakman | David Hornsby | September 25, 2008 | IP04011 | 1.35 |
Charlie learns that The Waitress has a boyfriend and enlists Mac to find out who it is, not knowing that it is in fact Mac himself. Jealous of Mac and Charlie's relationship, Dennis reveals the truth to Charlie. It turns out that Mac and the Waitress have not had sex, both having ulterior motives for wanting to do so. Frank and Dee are not featured in this episode.
| 37 | 5 | "Mac and Charlie Die" | Fred Savage & Matt Shakman | Charlie Day & Glenn Howerton & Rob McElhenney | October 2, 2008 | IP04003 | 1.02 |
Mac and Charlie use Dee's car and credit cards to fake their deaths to avoid the wrath of Mac's father, who was released from prison and is out for vengeance. Meanwhile, Frank and Dennis discover a glory hole in one of the bathroom stalls.
| 38 | 6 | "Mac and Charlie Die Part 2" | Fred Savage | Charlie Day & Glenn Howerton & Rob McElhenney | October 2, 2008 | IP04004 | 1.02 |
Dennis, Frank, and Dee find unique ways to cope with the apparent loss of their friends.
| 39 | 7 | "Who Pooped the Bed?" | Fred Savage | Rob McElhenney & Scott Marder & Rob Rosell | October 9, 2008 | IP04007 | 1.28 |
Frank and Charlie find that someone has pooped in their bed and Mac and Dennis join them in trying to catch the culprit; meanwhile, Dee takes the Waitress and Artemis on a Sex and the City-style night out.
| 40 | 8 | "Paddy's Pub: The Worst Bar in Philadelphia" | Matt Shakman | Scott Marder & Rob Rosell & David Hornsby | October 16, 2008 | IP04012 | 1.27 |
The gang kidnaps a newspaper critic (Fisher Stevens) who dubbed Paddy's Pub "the worst bar in Philadelphia," but they also kidnap the critic's neighbor and pet cat. Frank is not featured in this episode.
| 41 | 9 | "Dennis Reynolds: An Erotic Life" | Fred Savage | Glenn Howerton & Scott Marder & Rob Rosell | October 23, 2008 | IP04005 | 1.32 |
Dennis plans to publish an account of his sexual exploits and lands in a rehab facility with comedian Sinbad and Matchbox 20 frontman Rob Thomas. Meanwhile, Charlie and Dee try to "walk in each other's shoes."
| 42 | 10 | "Sweet Dee Has a Heart Attack" | Matt Shakman | Scott Marder & Rob Rosell | October 30, 2008 | IP04013 | 1.15 |
After Dee is hospitalized for a heart attack, she and Dennis try to adopt a healthier lifestyle; Charlie and Mac become office workers to get health insurance; while tripping on anxiety pills, Frank gets placed in a mental ward reminiscent of One Flew Over the Cuckoo's Nest, a film in which DeVito appeared.
| 43 | 11 | "The Gang Cracks the Liberty Bell" | Matt Shakman | Rob McElhenney & Glenn Howerton & David Hornsby | November 6, 2008 | IP04010 | 1.36 |
Attempting to turn Paddy's into a Philadelphia landmark, the Gang tells how Paddy's Pub was historically relevant during the Revolutionary War.
| 44 | 12 | "The Gang Gets Extreme: Home Makeover Edition" | Fred Savage | Charlie Day & David Hornsby & Glenn Howerton | November 13, 2008 | IP04001 | 1.31 |
Believing that "selfless acts" will lead to good karma, The Gang sets out to renovate a poor family's home a la Extreme Makeover: Home Edition, but Charlie and Dennis end up destroying the entire building trying to demolish a wall with a propane torch; Dee and Mac hold the family captive and try to instill "American values" in them despite a poor grasp of the Spanish language.
| 45 | 13 | "The Nightman Cometh" | Matt Shakman | Rob McElhenney & Glenn Howerton & Charlie Day | November 20, 2008 | IP04008 | 1.30 |
Charlie writes a musical based on his song from "Sweet Dee's Dating a Retarded Person" and casts the gang in lead roles; it's all a grand gesture to propose to The Waitress.

== Reception ==
The fourth season received positive reviews. On Rotten Tomatoes, it has an approval rating of 100% with an average score of 7.4 out of 10 based on 13 reviews. The website's critical consensus reads, "The Dayman defeats the Nightman and all is Sunny in Philadelphia with this uproariously nasty fourth season."

== Home media ==
It's Always Sunny in Philadelphia: The Complete 4th Season
| Set details | Special features |
| 13 episodes; 3-disc DVD set (Region 1 & 4); Technical specifications: Full Frame (1.33:1); English Dolby Surround; English, French, Spanish and Portuguese subtitles | Dennis Reynolds: An Erotic Life; The Nightman Cometh Live!; Blooper reel |
Release dates
| Region 1 | Region 4 |
| September 15, 2009 | March 30, 2011 |
