= It's Always Sunny in Philadelphia season 13 =

2018 season of American television series

It's Always Sunny in Philadelphia
- Season 13
- Promotional poster
- Starring: Charlie Day; Glenn Howerton; Rob McElhenney; Kaitlin Olson; Danny DeVito
- No. of episodes: 10

Release
- Original network: FXX
- Original release: September 5 – November 7, 2018

Season chronology
- ← Previous; Season 12 Next → Season 14

The thirteenth season of the American comedy television series It's Always Sunny in Philadelphia premiered on FXX on September 5, 2018. The season consists of 10 episodes and concluded on November 7, 2018.

== Cast ==
=== Main cast ===
- Charlie Day as Charlie Kelly
- Glenn Howerton as Dennis Reynolds
- Rob McElhenney as Mac
- Kaitlin Olson as Deandra "Dee" Reynolds
- Danny DeVito as Frank Reynolds

=== Recurring cast ===
- Mary Elizabeth Ellis as The Waitress
- David Hornsby as Cricket

=== Guest stars ===
- Mindy Kaling as Cindy
- Kate Comer as Amanda
- Artemis Pebdani as Artemis Dubois
- Sandy Martin as Mrs. Mac
- Lynne Marie Stewart as Bonnie Kelly
- Mary Lynn Rajskub as Gail the Snail
- Michael Naughton as The Waiter
- Dawn Alden as Martina Navratilova
- Jerry Hauck as Boss Hogg
- Humphrey Ker as Alan
- Marypat Farrell as Kate
- Tyler Labine as Shawn Dumont
- Logan Miller as Aiden
- Tricia O'Kelley as Brenda
- Gillian Vigman as Karen
- Jim Cashman as John
- Peter Mackenzie as Doctor
- Lance Barber as Bill Ponderosa
- Andrew Friedman as Jack Kelly
- T.J. Hoban as Rex
- Travis Schuldt as Ben The Soldier
- Beau Allen as himself
- Jason Kelce as himself
- Gregory Scott Cummins as Luther Mac
- Roxy Wood as Drag Queen

== Production ==
On April 1, 2016, the series was renewed for a thirteenth and fourteenth season, which tied it with The Adventures of Ozzie and Harriet as the longest-running (in number of seasons) live-action sitcom in American TV history.

In March 2017, following the twelfth season finale in which Glenn Howerton's character was seemingly written off the show, Howerton expressed doubt about his return for the thirteenth season, describing it as "partially a creative and personal decision." He also suggested that the show would take an "extended hiatus" in order to accommodate the cast's other projects. In late April, Kaitlin Olson confirmed Sunny's extended hiatus ahead of the thirteenth season due to the cast's busy schedules. In August 2018, Rob McElhenney confirmed that Howerton is "in pretty much every episode" of the season. Howerton appeared in six of the season's ten episodes, but had no writing credits.

== Episodes ==
No. overall	No. in season	Title	Directed by	Written by	Original release date	Prod. code	US viewers (millions)
135	1	"The Gang Makes Paddy's Great Again"	Todd Biermann	David Hornsby	September 5, 2018	XIP13010	0.606
The Gang recruits a new member in Dennis' absence: Cindy (Mindy Kaling), a scheming woman of color who helps them better themselves and take advantage of several political parties. Meanwhile, Mac orders a sex doll that looks like Dennis, which threatens their newfound success.
136	2	"The Gang Escapes"	LP	Megan Ganz	September 12, 2018	XIP13006	0.390
Dee convinces the Gang to participate in an escape room exercise in Dennis and Mac's apartment.
137	3	"The Gang Beats Boggs: Ladies' Reboot"	Kat Coiro	Dannah Phirman & Danielle Schneider	September 19, 2018	XIP13002	0.420
Dee, The Waitress, Artemis, Mrs. Mac, and Bonnie Kelly board an all-female flight bound for Los Angeles to participate in the Women's March until Dee informs them that they're really doing an all-female version of the Boggs Challenge.
138	4	"Time's Up for the Gang"	Kat Coiro	Megan Ganz	September 26, 2018	XIP13001	0.312
Due to heightened concerns over sexual harassment, misconduct, and intimidation thanks to the Me Too movement and Time's Up, The Gang is forced to go to an anti-harassment seminar so their bar can be taken off an Internet list of Worst Bars For Women to Frequent.
139	5	"The Gang Gets New Wheels"	Todd Biermann	Conor Galvin	October 3, 2018	XIP13007	0.319
The Gang gets into misadventures involving vehicles: Dennis finds his Range Rover destroyed and gets a less-expensive car, which makes him nicer and nets him new friends; Dee gets the Range Rover Frank wanted to buy for himself but had to give up because of his expired license, and she makes friends with upper-class moms and becomes more like Dennis; Frank goes to driver's-ed classes and befriends a crude teen; and Mac and Charlie start riding bikes like they did in childhood and run afoul of a new generation of bullying bike thieves.
140	6	"The Gang Solves the Bathroom Problem"	Josh Drisko	Erin Ryan	October 10, 2018	XIP13005	0.342
The Gang misses out on a Jimmy Buffett concert when they see Mac come out of the women's bathroom and get caught up in discussing issues of gender identity, diversity, and public-bathroom use.
141	7	"The Gang Does a Clip Show"	Todd Biermann	Dannah Phirman & Danielle Schneider	October 17, 2018	XIP13008	0.298
While waiting for their phones to download software updates, the Gang reminisces about their past adventures in clip-show style, but their memories become warped, as does time itself.
142	8	"Charlie's Home Alone"	Kat Coiro	Adam Weinstock & Andy Jones	October 24, 2018	XIP13004	0.294
Charlie is left alone at the bar on the weekend of Super Bowl LII; after falling victim to his own Home Alone-style traps to protect the bar from intruders, he must try to overcome several obstacles to complete his rituals to help the Eagles win the game.
143	9	"The Gang Wins the Big Game"	Kat Coiro	Conor Galvin	October 31, 2018	XIP13003	0.323
While Charlie stays in Philadelphia, Mac, Dee, Frank, and some of their closest friends head to Minnesota with tickets to see the Eagles in the Super Bowl.
144	10	"Mac Finds His Pride"	Todd Biermann	Rob McElhenney & Charlie Day	November 7, 2018	XIP13009	0.357
Frank tries to recruit Mac for the Gang's Gay Pride Parade float, but Mac is distraught over finding out what kind of gay man he's supposed to be and if he should come out to his father.

== Reception ==
The thirteenth season received positive reviews. On Rotten Tomatoes, it has an approval rating of 94% with an average score of 8/10 based on 18 reviews. The site's critical consensus reads, "It's Always Sunny's winning formula keeps the laughs rolling and the stomachs turning in a thirteenth season that's topical, triumphant, and toxic in the best way." The finale in particular received praise, with many critics lauding the unexpected emotional and artistic depth of Rob McElhenney's performance.
