= Mac Finds His Pride =

- It's Always Sunny in Philadelphia episode
- Episode no.: Season 13; Episode 10
- Directed by: Todd Biermann
- Written by: Rob McElhenney; Charlie Day
- Cinematography by: John Tanzer
- Editing by: Josh Drisko
- Production code: XIP13009
- Original air date: November 7, 2018
- Running time: 22 minutes

Guest appearances
- David Hornsby as Cricket; Gregory Scott Cummins as Luther; Roxy Wood as Drag Queen

Episode chronology
← Previous "The Gang Wins the Big Game"	Next → "The Gang Gets Romantic"
- It's Always Sunny in Philadelphia season 13

"Mac Finds His Pride" is the tenth and last episode of the thirteenth season of the American television sitcom It's Always Sunny in Philadelphia. It is the 144th overall episode of the series, and was written by series creator Rob McElhenney and executive producer Charlie Day, and directed by supervising producer Todd Biermann. It originally aired on FXX on November 7, 2018.

The series follows "The Gang", a group of five misfit friends: twins Dennis and Deandra "(Sweet) Dee" Reynolds, their friends Charlie Kelly and Ronald "Mac" McDonald, and Frank Reynolds, Dennis' and Dee's legal father. The Gang runs the fictional Paddy's Pub, an unsuccessful Irish bar in South Philadelphia. In the episode, Frank tries to recruit Mac to dance on a float for an upcoming Pride parade, while Mac decides to come out to his father in order to find peace with his sexuality.

== Plot ==
Frank (Danny DeVito) tries to recruit a depressed Mac (Rob McElhenney) to dance on a float that The Gang is making for a Pride parade the next day as a "prize gay," even though Frank says he doesn't "get the whole gay thing." Mac confesses that he doesn't know where he fits in as a gay man, to which Frank admits he doesn't "get" Mac either. But he is determined to help Mac "find" his pride, despite falling and injuring his nose in the process, forcing him to plug it with trash.

Frank takes Mac to an S&M club expecting it's what gay men are into. Mac, uncomfortable, explains it is a small subset of the culture that he isn't into. The two are chased out when Frank tries to hide his nose rags in a buffet of chicken wings, again bemoaning he will never "get this." Frank instead takes Mac to a Drag show but Mac is still unimpressed. Mac reveals he hasn't yet come out to his father Luther (Gregory Scott Cummins), but that he has a "storm" of feelings that have been inside him his whole life, imagining God appearing to him as a hot chick and they start dancing. Frank, hoping to get Mac on the float, encourages him to visit his father in prison.

Mac and Frank visit Luther in prison, but Luther interrupts Mac's exposition believing he has gotten a woman pregnant, and is elated, hoping he will have a son and admitting he never "got" Mac. Frank visits Dee (Kaitlin Olson) and Charlie (Charlie Day) as they build the float, and they insist Frank convince Mac to dance on the float, hoping it will attract business to the bar. An attempt to bring in Rickety Cricket (David Hornsby) to pretend to be gay is shot down as he disgusts Dee. Frank returns to Mac, spotting a beautiful woman leaving his apartment, and assumes Mac slept with her to appease his father. Mac brushes him off, but Frank decides to help Mac come out to his father, because he will otherwise never be at peace with his sexuality.

Frank tricks the prison into gathering the prisoners for a show with Luther sitting at the front. Mac tells his father he is gay and then he and the beautiful woman, revealed to be a ballerina, begin an elaborate dance. Luther stands up with a look of disgust and leaves mid-way through the performance. An emotional Mac finishes the performance and collapses into the arms of the dancer, and to a standing ovation from the prisoners. Frank, wide-eyed and in awe, exclaims, "Oh my god. I get it. I get it."

== Production ==
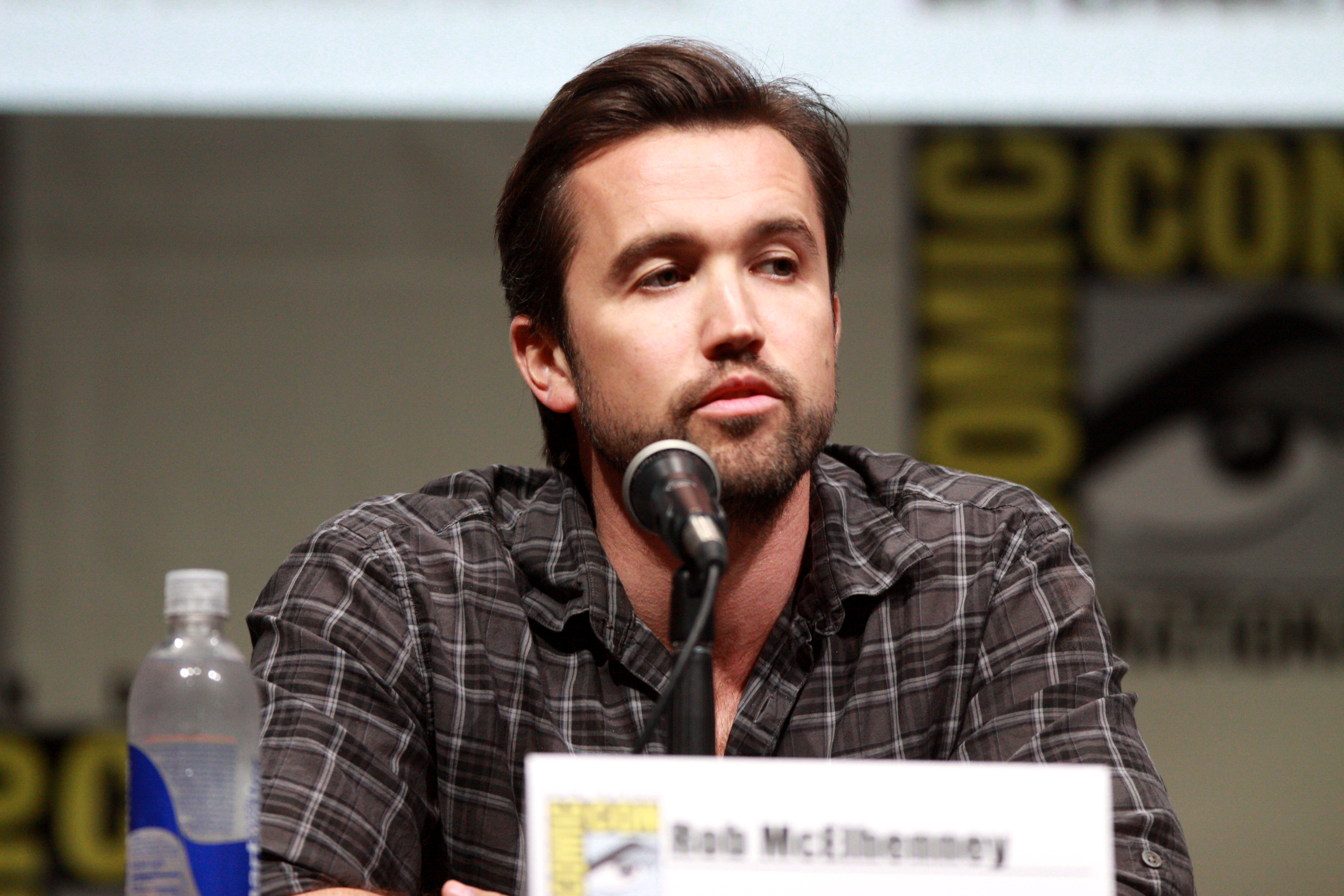
Episode co-writer Rob McElhenney said he was surprised at the positive reception from the LGBTQ community to Mac's coming out, and wanted to explore more character development for the season.

The episode was directed by supervising producer Todd Biermann, and was written by series creator Rob McElhenney and executive producer Charlie Day. The final five-minute dance sequence featured the song "Varúð" by Icelandic band Sigur Rós and was kept under wraps, not teased or promoted in order to surprise the audience.

Mac's homosexuality had been alluded to in jokes for much of the series, but he finally decided to accept he was gay in the Season 12 episode "Hero or Hate Crime?" McElhenney said he received an unexpected outpouring of support for the episode from the LGBTQ community, and for Season 13, he wanted to focus on character development given Glenn Howerton's stepping back from the season, as well as a desire to try something new. Day said the episode began as a pitch about Frank being more tolerant about something, and wanted to tell a story about learning and change, something rarely done in the series.

McElhenney, whose two brothers and mother are gay, wanted the scene to be serious; he expected it to be meaningful for fans who had seen the character progress through the series. McElhenney approached choreographer Alison Faulk, with whom he'd worked on a previous Sunny episode, with the idea for a dance scene involving Mac coming out to his father. Given McElhenney's lack of dance experience, Faulk suggested the scene be with a partner, and so ballerina Kylie Shea and choreographer Leo Moctezuma were brought aboard for the scene. McElhenney trained for four months in weekly sessions in Faulk's garage, while also working out, and Faulk was impressed with his commitment and ideas. Shea, the younger sister of Grindr co-founder Scott LeWallen, also felt a personal connection to the role because of firsthand knowledge of the familial struggles with sexual identity. She described the preparation as physically demanding.

Faulk described the choreography as "kind of a visual wrestling with yourself to get to this place," with Shea representing a duality within him and also an "angelic, motherly figure." The rain added an ominous feeling with sunshine at the end to explain the character's narrative. Faulk was particularly impressed with the symbolism of a movement where McElhenney swung Shea around and flung her to the ground, approaching her while she rose to a développé, as a moment of "lifting each other up, essentially lifting yourself up to move on." Moctezuma likened the choreography to the struggle for acceptance, self-doubt, and trauma of the LGBTQ+ community. Shea felt her jump at the ending was one of her most difficult performances, physically and mentally, but that her character served as "the light in Mac's darkness," and that the two "had to survive this tumultuous storm of dance together in order for Mac to find peace within himself."

== Reception ==
Many critics praised the unexpected emotional and artistic depth of McElhenney's performance. Ben Travers of IndieWire said the episode offers a "sincerity that separates it from other episodes, with an execution that elevates it above its peers." Dennis Perkins of AV Club said the final scene was "the single most surprising and impressive sequence I’ve seen on television this year," complementing Mac's "comically twisted zealot" role in other episodes, which stem from a need for love and acceptance. He also praised DeVito's performance, and the setup of the first 16 minutes of the episode's "tired in-jokes, asides, and rehashed bits," which lead into the unexpected scene. He said it could change the direction of the series, and thought it could give room to take the show in a new direction. Brian Oaster of Et al. said it offered a shock for fans to offer a serious scene, and that such a change-up allowed a chance for the Sunny characters to evolve and disrupt the show's structure after so long on the air while maintaining its otherwise raunchy humor.
