= Mac and Charlie Die =

- It's Always Sunny in Philadelphia episodes
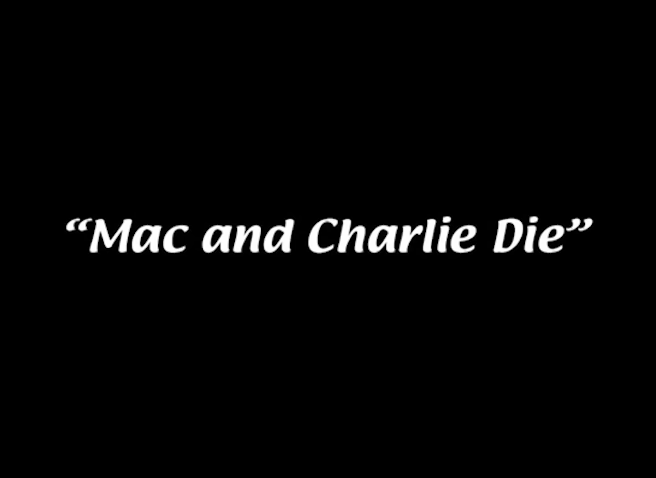
- Episode nos.: Season 4 Episodes 5 & 6
- Directed by: Fred Savage (Parts 1 & 2); Matt Shakman (Part 1)
- Written by: Charlie Day; Glenn Howerton; Rob McElhenney
- Cinematography by: Peter Smokler
- Editing by: Robert Bramwell; Josh Drisko
- Production codes: IP04003; IP04004
- Original air date: October 2, 2008
- Running time: 22 minutes

Guest appearances
- Gregory Scott Cummins as Luther; Geoff Pierson as Warden; Lynne Marie Stewart as Mrs. Kelly; Sandy Martin as Mac's Mom; Keir O'Donnell as Jan

Episode chronology
← Previous "Mac's Banging the Waitress"	Next → "Who Pooped the Bed?"
- It's Always Sunny in Philadelphia season 4

"Mac and Charlie Die (Part 1 & 2)" are the fifth and sixth episodes of the fourth season of the FX sitcom It's Always Sunny in Philadelphia. The two-part episode was written by Charlie Day, Glenn Howerton, and series creator Rob McElhenney, and directed by producers Fred Savage and Matt Shakman. (Note: Shakman only directed part 1.) They are the 37th and 38th overall episodes of the series. Both parts originally aired back-to-back on FX on October 2, 2008.

The series follows "The Gang", a group of five misfit friends: twins Dennis and Deandra "(Sweet) Dee" Reynolds, their friends Charlie Kelly and Mac, and Frank Reynolds, Dennis' and Dee's legal father. The Gang runs the fictional Paddy's Pub, an unsuccessful Irish bar in South Philadelphia.

In the episodes, Mac and Charlie use Dee's car and credit cards to fake their deaths to avoid the wrath of Mac's father, who was released from prison and is out for vengeance. Meanwhile, Frank and Dennis discover a glory hole in one of the bathroom stalls. Dennis, Frank, and Dee then find unique ways to cope with the apparent loss of their friends.

== Plot ==
=== Part 1 ===
After Mac (Rob McElhenney) and Charlie (Charlie Day) fail to frame Mac's father Luther (Gregory Scott Cummins) for threatening them at his parole hearing, Luther is released on parole. Fearing that he will seek out vengeance on them, Mac and Charlie agree that the only way to avoid Luther's wrath is to fake their deaths. The two proceed to steal Dee (Kaitlin Olson)'s car and her purse and crash the car into a brick wall to stage their apparent suicide, although Mac is injured when he fails to jump out of the car before it hits the wall. After failing to blow up the car using a hand grenade and a pistol, the two decide that they went far enough and go into hiding on the rooftop of Paddy's Pub.

Meanwhile, a glory hole is discovered in the men's bathroom stalls at Paddy's. Dennis (Glenn Howerton) is intrigued by the hole and the experience of anonymous sex. Frank (Danny DeVito) proceeds to take Dennis to an orgy, but he is left unimpressed and disgusted at the age and shape of the participants. Back at Paddy's, an eyehole is installed atop of the glory hole between the stalls. While Frank and Dennis are discussing potential scenarios while using the hole, Dee shows up and informs the two that Mac and Charlie are apparently dead. They play a suicide tape discovered at the scene but then proceed to argue over the demands made in Mac's will. As the three argue, Mac and Charlie listen from atop the roof.

=== Part 2 ===
A memorial is held for Mac and Charlie at Paddy's, with only Mac and Charlie's mothers (Sandy Martin and Lynn Marie Stewart, respectively) and the rest of the gang attending, while Mac and Charlie watch through the air ducts. While Frank mourns, Dee believes that Mac and Charlie are still alive. Commuting on a bus after her car was destroyed, Dee sees Mac and Charlie on the streets and confronts them on Paddy's rooftop later that night. Mac reveals to her that his father has been released from prison and that she would have to fake her death to avoid Luther as well.

Meanwhile, Dennis is eager to move on from Mac and finds a new roommate, Jan (Keir O'Donnell), a mysterious European. He promises Dennis extravagant European-style sex parties and brings two German women in underwear to party at the apartment. Mac and Charlie watch from the outside, with Mac becoming jealous of how quickly Dennis has moved on from him. The two later witness Frank coping with losing Charlie by using a mannequin lookalike. Meanwhile, Dee attempts to fake her death by telling Dennis she is going on a jog alone by herself at night, but he ignores her.

Mac, Charlie, and Dee meet up at Paddy's and retreat to the back office when Dennis and Jan enter with a group of women to hold an anonymous sex party; Frank enters with the Charlie mannequin as well. Furious at Dennis having fun without them, Mac, Charlie, and Dee decide that they will scare them by pretending to be ghosts. Jan tells Dennis that he has arranged for Dennis to use the glory hole. Dennis is excited, only for him to find out that Jan had arranged for him and Frank to use the hole. Disgusted, the two men proceed to kick Jan and the girls out of the bar. Mac, Charlie, and Dee then enter the bar with firecrackers to scare Frank and Dennis, but Dennis reveals that he knew they were not dead because he was able to hear them speaking and see them through the windows, and was only getting a new roommate to annoy Mac. Charlie then expresses concern that Luther may be still coming after them, but Frank reads a letter left by Luther on Paddy's door: he has fled to Tijuana and asks Mac to stay as far away from him as possible.

== Reception ==
The episode received acclaim from critics and has been voted as one of the best episodes in the series. Donna Bowman of The A.V. Club gives both parts A ratings, calling the episodes "solid gold" and praising their "brilliant invention and utter crudity." Seth Amitin, in a review for IGN, called the episode the best of the season and says that the jokes in the episode were "all hilarious".

In a 2015 ranking of the 20 best It's Always Sunny in Philadelphia episodes, "Mac and Charlie Die" was listed as first place by Rolling Stone.
