= The Gang Solves the Gas Crisis =

- It's Always Sunny in Philadelphia episode
- Episode no.: Season 4 Episode 2
- Directed by: Matt Shakman
- Written by: Charlie Day; Sonny Lee; Patrick Walsh
- Cinematography by: Peter Smokler
- Editing by: Tim Roche
- Production code: XIP04009
- Original air date: September 18, 2008
- Running time: 22 minutes

Guest appearance
- Zachary Knighton as Random Guy

Episode chronology
← Previous "Mac and Dennis: Manhunters"	Next → "America's Next Top Paddy's Billboard Contest"
- It's Always Sunny in Philadelphia season 4

"The Gang Solves the Gas Crisis" is the second episode in the fourth season of the American television sitcom It's Always Sunny in Philadelphia. It is the 34th overall episode of the series, and was written by executive producer Charlie Day and Sonny Lee and Patrick Walsh, and directed by producer Matt Shakman.

The series follows "The Gang", a group of five misfit friends: twins Dennis and Deandra "(Sweet) Dee" Reynolds, their friends Charlie Kelly and Mac, and Frank Reynolds, Dennis' and Dee's legal father. The Gang runs the fictional Paddy's Pub, an unsuccessful Irish bar in South Philadelphia. In the episode, Mac, Charlie, and Dennis team up to solve the gas crisis through purchasing gasoline while Frank and Dee attempt to spy on Bruce Mathis.

== Plot ==
Due to increasing electricity costs, Charlie (Charlie Day) reveals to Mac (Rob McElhenney) and Dennis (Glenn Howerton) that he has been using a gas generator to power Paddy's Pub. An argument over the cost of gasoline and the group's individual roles leads to Mac, the self-proclaimed "brains of the organization", proposing a plan to solve the gas crisis: purchase gasoline through a bank loan, store it in Paddy's basement, then sell it a year later at a higher price. The three are turned down by the bank, however, when they cannot agree on who will seduce the female bank teller. They proceed to get their funding by stealing Dee (Kaitlin Olson)'s life savings from her sock drawer. They head to a gas station and began pumping gasoline into barrels, but are stopped by the gas station attendant. They then transport gas through Dennis's car and have Charlie siphon it out, but the strategy proves to be ineffective. An attempt to sell the gas back to the gas station fails, so they set up a stand next to the station. However, it comes to a halt when Mac suffers a burn due to Charlie accidentally spitting a fireball onto him in an attempt to attract customers. Mac is forced to have a towel duct-taped over his head to cover the injury, and Dennis takes the lead in the scheme.

Meanwhile, Frank (Danny DeVito) and Dee discover that Bruce Mathis, Dennis and Dee's biological father, is giving part of Barbara Reynolds's money away to a Muslim community center. Furious at Bruce's action, Frank purchases a "rape van" to spy on Bruce at his apartment, thinking that he would find evidence that Bruce's donation was a deal with terrorists. Frank and Dee then break into the apartment and plant baby monitors and fertilizers. While the two were scouting outside of Bruce's apartment, Mac steals the van and crashes into a car that Dee previously hit. Charlie, Dennis, and Mac then use the van to store the gasoline and sell them from door-to-door. However, Charlie's character of a Texan oilman scares a householder and leads to her calling the police, causing the three to flee in response.

Back at the bar, Frank, thinking that Dee set him up, waterboards her with the men's room urinal. Mac, Charlie, and Dennis then enter, revealing that they stole the van. Mac then realizes that the paradigm of the group was off because Frank and Dee were not included. The gang then decides to combine their schemes together: they will torture Bruce into confessing to being a terrorist collaborator, turn him to the authorities, and use the reward money to purchase gas. However, en route to the apartment, Charlie, playing his role as the "wild card" of the group, reveals he cut the van's brakes and jumps out. The remaining gang members panic and jump out as well. The free-wheeling van full of gasoline then crashes into the car the gang previously hit and destroys it. The car's owner, the occupant of the apartment thought to be Bruce's, runs out to witness the destruction of his car. Upon seeing the man, the gang realizes that they were onto the wrong person and run away from the scene.

== Reception ==
The episode received positive reviews from critics. Donna Bowman of The A.V. Club gave the episode an A− rating, saying the episode played its strengths by "using pop culture conventions to provide a jumping-off point for meta-riffs on their implausibility."

In 2015, the episode was ranked by Rolling Stone as the fifth best It's Always Sunny in Philadelphia episode.
