= The Nightman Cometh =

- It's Always Sunny in Philadelphia episode
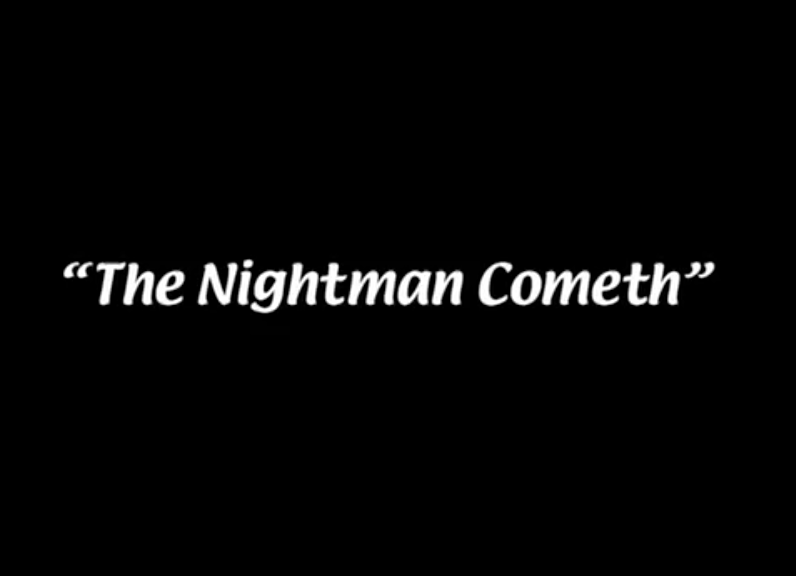
- Episode no.: Season 4 Episode 13
- Directed by: Matt Shakman
- Written by: Charlie Day; Glenn Howerton; Rob McElhenney
- Cinematography by: Peter Smokler
- Editing by: Tim Roche
- Production code: IP04008
- Original air date: November 20, 2008
- Running time: 22 minutes

Guest appearances
- Mary Elizabeth Ellis as The Waitress; Artemis Pebdani as Artemis; Mae Laborde as Gladys

Episode chronology
| ← Previous "The Gang Gets Extreme: Home Makeover Edition" | Next → "The Gang Exploits the Mortgage Crisis" |
- It's Always Sunny in Philadelphia season 4

"The Nightman Cometh" is the thirteenth and final episode of the fourth season of the American sitcom television series It's Always Sunny in Philadelphia. It is the 45th overall episode of the series and was written by co-creators Charlie Day, Glenn Howerton, and Rob McElhenney and directed by producer Matt Shakman. It originally aired on FX on November 20, 2008.

In the episode, the Gang performs a rock opera based on songs written by Charlie, unaware of his true motives for spontaneously putting on the production.

Since its original broadcast The Nightman Cometh is widely regarded as one of the best and "classic" episodes of the series. It was later adapted into a short-lived stage musical in 2009, with the series' cast reprising their roles.

== Plot ==
Charlie notifies the gang that he's written a musical. Dennis and Mac quiz Charlie over his motivations, but the gang want to play the parts that Charlie has written for them purely out of their own vanity.

Since he is functionally illiterate, Charlie enlists the help of Dee's friend Artemis to transcribe the script into something legible. Dennis is disappointed to be cast as the Nightman rather than the hero role, but Mac decides he would rather be the Nightman anyway. Frank is cast as the troll and Dee is cast as a princess.

As rehearsals get underway, Dee is concerned over the subject matter of her song's lyrics, contending they sound like she molests children. Charlie insists that Dennis' "little boy" role is metaphorical, and reminds Dee that this is her only opportunity to sing a lead part. During Frank and Mac's song, "Troll Toll", Charlie tries in vain to prevent Frank from enunciating the lyrical reference to "boy's soul" as "boy's hole". Charlie also gets frustrated when Mac insists that the scene where the Nightman becomes the Boy is depicted as non-consensual sex.

Charlie tracks down The Waitress, giving her a ticket and telling her that he will never bother her again if she attends the musical.

On the night of the show, Charlie unexpectedly tells the gang that he will not be their pianist for the performance and watches the show from the wings. Dee ad-libs a song clarifying that she's not interested in children, much to Charlie's chagrin. Mac is disappointed when the audience reacts to his catlike appearance and karate moves with laughter, after which the Waitress watches in shock as he simulates intercourse with Dennis.

At the end of the play, Dennis' "little boy" transforms into the Dayman and kills the Troll with a handgun. The Dayman fights the Nightman and pulls his heart out. The cast members then join together to sing the finale song, "Dayman", which Dennis and Charlie had previously written together. As the song ends, Charlie swoops down from a sun from above the stage, wearing a yellow outfit, and proposes to the Waitress through song, revealing the true intention of the musical. The Waitress refuses his proposal, and Charlie confirms that he will not be honoring his promise to leave her alone.

== Production ==
The Dayman was first introduced as a song written by Charlie Kelly and Dennis Reynolds in the ninth episode of the third season, "Sweet Dee's Dating a Retarded Person." Glenn Howerton explained: "Scott Marder and Rob Rosell wrote the episode and the lyrics: 'Dayman, fighter of the Nightman, champion of the sun / He's a master of karate and friendship for everyone.' Which are just the worst fucking lyrics ever, which is exactly what we wanted."

The unexpectedly enthusiastic reception of the Dayman song inspired the cast to devise a musical episode, but one "organic to the tone of the series." One of the initial ideas was the musical being an elaborate prank with a rival bar but that concept was eventually abandoned. "We finally realized: Maybe Charlie writes the musical and our characters are just so fucking vain that we can't stomach the thought of Charlie getting other people to do it," said Howerton. "Any time we deal with that kind of subject matter, I like to think it's coming from a more intelligent place," Charlie Day explained. "A rape joke is not remotely a funny thing; a man writing a musical that he thinks is about self-empowerment, and not realizing that all his lyrics sound like they're about a child being molested, is a funny thing. The joke is coming from confusion and misunderstanding, which are classic tropes of all comedy."

Most of the music in the episode was written by Day and composer Cormac Bluestone. "I said, 'Let me go off and write some of the songs and lyrics,' and I went to the piano," Day said. "We'd already had the Dayman song, so I pulled out the 'Troll Toll' and 'Tiny Boy, Little Boy' songs." The episode was performed in front of background actors who didn't have any context for the musical so their bemused reactions were genuine. Director Matt Shakman told the cast, "Just do it all the way through."

"I got Artemis Pebdani to act like the stage manager of the event and actually come out and do the speech that you always hear in shows about where the fire exits are," Shakman said. "I remember a lot of confused faces as we were performing," Rob McElhenney recalled. "People [who weren't familiar with the show] were wondering why it was funny… But I always go back to Glenn and Charlie; if they're still laughing, then I know it's funny."

== Stage adaptation ==
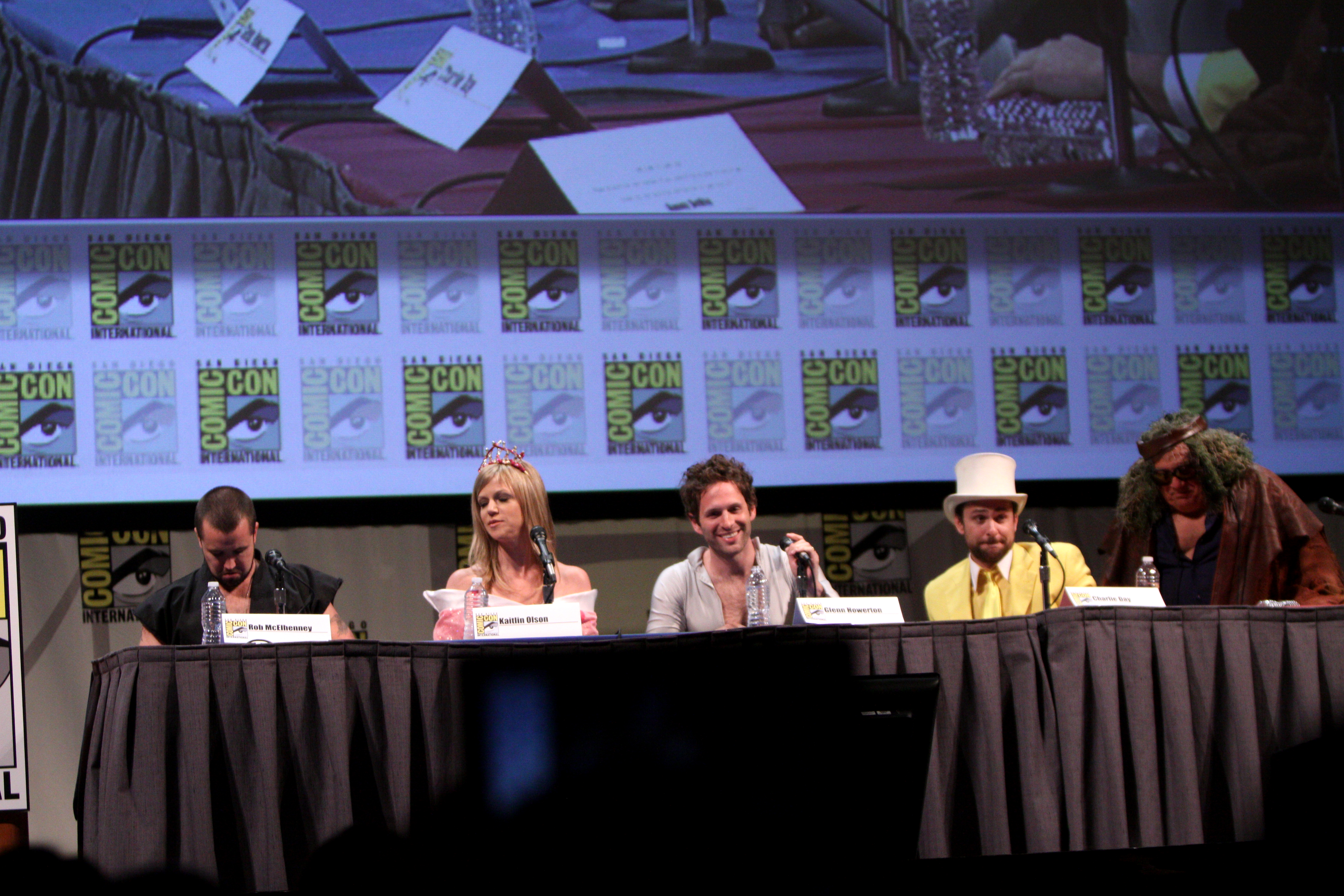
All main cast members as characters from the play.

In September 2009, the cast took their show live. The "Gang" performed the musical The Nightman Cometh in New York City, Boston, Seattle, San Francisco, Los Angeles, and Philadelphia. Mary Elizabeth Ellis and Artemis Pebdani also appeared in the performance as The Waitress and Artemis. Actress Rhea Perlman (wife of Danny DeVito) assumed the role of Gladys.

McElhenney said that Live Nation originally approached the cast about doing the show in 30 cities, but the cast settled on 6. Howerton described the show as "essentially an expanded version of the actual episode of "The Nightman Cometh", which was the final episode for season four. There are some added moments, added scenes, added songs, and extended versions of songs that already existed." Two new songs were included in the performance and a longer running time allowed for greater improvisation by the actors. The performance was also preceded by a preview screening of a season five episode.

The Los Angeles performance, filmed at The Troubadour, was included as a bonus feature on the season four DVD box set.

== Reception ==
"The Nightman Cometh" is widely regarded as one of the best episodes of It's Always Sunny in Philadelphia. The episode holds a 9.7 star rating on the media database website IMDB, making it the second highest rated episode of the series after season 10’s “Charlie Work”.

Seth Amitin of IGN gave a favorable review of the episode in 2008, writing "I liked it, probably because it wasn't another episode of the gang being jerks and scamming someone or looking to get something out of someone. It was them trying to do something out of their belief that they can", although he also wrote that he found it unlikely that Charlie Day's character would be capable of producing a musical. In 2026, Screen Rant posted an article on the episode, claiming "'The Nightman Cometh' is It’s Always Sunny at its absolute best," and that it has yet to have been surpassed as the show's greatest episode.

== Themes ==
The title of Charlie's play is a reference to Eugene O'Neill's classic play The Iceman Cometh. O'Neill's play is described as being about "dead-end alcoholics who spend every possible moment seeking oblivion in one another's company and trying to con or wheedle free drinks from Harry and the bartenders", which is a good description of the gang.
