= Lewallen =

Lewallen is a surname. Notable people with the surname include:

- Jimmie Lewallen (1919–1995), American stock car racing driver
- Kylie Shea Lewallen (born 1986), American ballet dancer
- The Lewallen Brothers:
  - Bobby Lewallen, American musician
  - Cal Lewallen Jr., American musician
  - Cal Lewallen Sr., American musician
  - Keith Lewallen, American musician
  - Tim Lewallen, American musician
