= A Quiet Little Marriage =

- Directed by: Mo Perkins
- Written by: Mo Perkins; Mary Elizabeth Ellis; Cy Carter
- Produced by: Hal Haberman
- Starring: Cy Carter; Mary Elizabeth Ellis
- Cinematography: Eric Zimmerman
- Edited by: Julia Gandelsonas
- Music by: Dave Lux
- Distributed by: IFC Films
- Release date: October 18, 2008 (Austin)
- Country: United States
- Language: English

A Quiet Little Marriage is a 2008 American independent drama film, written and directed by Mo Perkins in her feature directorial debut. It was co-written by Mary Elizabeth Ellis and Cy Carter, who also star. The supporting cast includes Jimmi Simpson, Charlie Day, and Melanie Lynskey.

== Cast ==
- Cy Carter as Dax
- Mary Elizabeth Ellis as Olive
- Jimmi Simpson as Jackson
- Michael O'Neill as Bruce
- Charlie Day as Adam
- Melanie Lynskey as Monique
- Lucy DeVito as Silvia
- Rita Taggart as Nurse Green

== Premise ==
When Olive decides she wants a baby—after long since agreeing with husband Dax that they'd never have children—she covertly devises a plan to make it happen. Discovering her scheme, a determined Dax takes countermeasures to thwart it.

== Production ==
=== Writing ===
The story was conceived by Perkins, Ellis and Carter, who had worked together on several short films and become friends. Perkins wrote the bulk of the script herself, developing its themes through brainstorming sessions with Ellis and Carter, followed by weekly rehearsals where the two actors would perform what Perkins had written, allowing her to see what worked and what didn't. "For me it was a wonderful way to write, a real luxury", said Perkins. "Every rehearsal was a discovery for all of us and the story just kept getting stronger".

=== Filming ===
Principal photography lasted 15 days.

== Release and reception ==
A Quiet Little Marriage premiered at the Austin Film Festival on October 18, 2008. Variety's John Anderson called it "intimate and genuine ... a movie that creates a convincing and serious portrait [of] marriage", while John Grassi of PopMatters noted its "honest" storytelling, while also praising the cinematography and score.

== Accolades ==
- 2008 Austin Film Festival
  - Winner: Audience Award for Best Narrative Feature
- 2009 Slamdance Film Festival
  - Winner: Grand Jury Prize for Best Narrative Feature
