= Michael O'Neill (actor) =

American actor

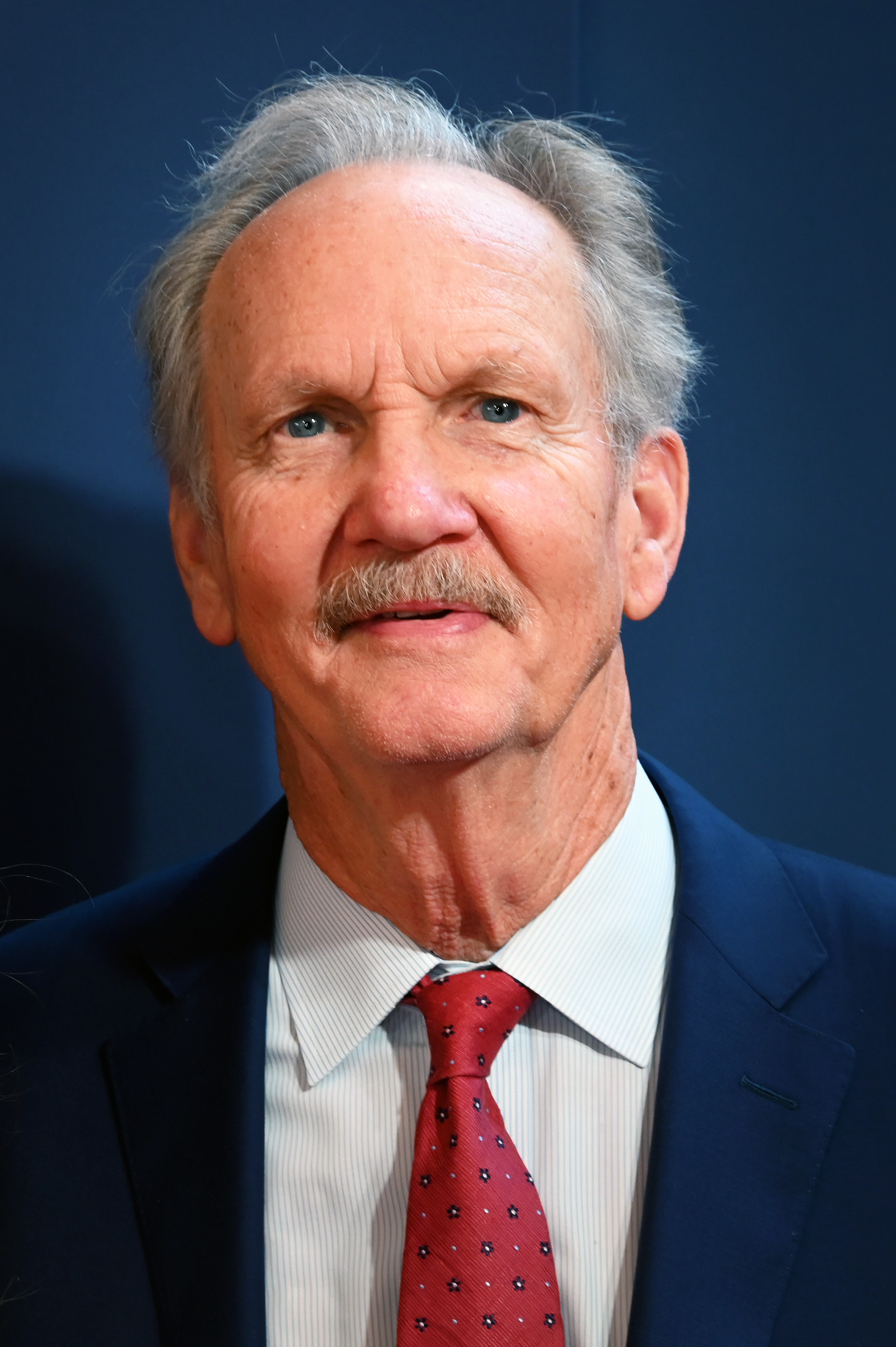
- O'Neill in 2026
- Born: May 29, 1951 (age 75); Montgomery, Alabama, U.S.
- Education: Auburn University (1974)
- Occupation: Actor
- Years active: 1981–present
- Spouse: Mary O'Neill
- Children: 3

Michael O'Neill (born May 29, 1951) is an American character actor. He is known for his recurring role as Secret Service Agent Ron Butterfield in the NBC political drama The West Wing.

== Early life and education ==
O'Neill was born and raised in Montgomery, Alabama. He attended Capitol Heights Junior High and Robert E. Lee High School, graduating in 1969. In high school he played basketball and was elected class beau and a class favorite. He graduated from Auburn University in 1974. While at Auburn, O'Neill was inducted as a brother of Lambda Chi Alpha. After attending Auburn, he spent time under the tutelage of actor Will Geer and one of Geer's daughters, the actress Ellen Geer, at Theatricum Botanicum in Los Angeles before moving to New York to pursue his career there.

== Career ==
With a career stretching through three decades, he usually portrays senior law enforcement or military officers. He played Special Agent Ron Butterfield, the head of President Josiah Bartlet's Secret Service detail, on The West Wing, and CTU Administrative Director Richard Walsh in the first two episodes of 24. He played Sgt. Maj. Ron Cheals in CBS' action drama series The Unit.

He starred in the season 6 two-part finale of Grey's Anatomy as Gary Clark, the broken widower who perpetrates a hospital shooting while pursuing the doctors responsible for unplugging his wife's life support. He portrayed Nick Ford on the second season of Bates Motel, and Alan Sparks on Extant. He had a recurring role as Senator Roland Foulkes on Rectify.

His most notable film performances occur in Seabiscuit, Secondhand Lions, Transformers, Dancer, Texas Pop. 81, Traffic, Sea of Love, A Quiet Little Marriage, Nothing but the Truth, Green Zone, J. Edgar and Dallas Buyers Club.

== Personal life ==
O'Neill lives in Los Angeles,with his wife, Mary. He has three daughters, Ella, Annie, and Molly.

== Filmography ==
=== Film ===
Year	Title	Role	Notes
1981	Ghost Story	Churchill	
1989	Sea of Love	Raymond Brown	
1992	The Gun in Betty Lou's Handbag	Jergens	
1992	Jennifer Eight	Angelo Serato	
1992	Lorenzo's Oil	School Psychologist	
1993	For Their Own Good	Clark Thompson	Television movie
1993	Victim of Love: The Shannon Mohr Story	Dick Britton	Television movie
1994	Blind Justice	Spencer Heyman	Television movie
1994	Beyond Betrayal	Ray Pasquerello	Television movie
1994	On Trial	Himself	Television movie
1995	Awake to Danger	Detective Brickman	Television movie
1995	Bushwhacked	Jon Jordan	
1996	Norma Jean & Marilyn	Mr. Kimmel	Television movie
1996	The Sunchaser	FBI Agent Moreland	
1998	Standoff	Cult Leader (voice)	
1998	Host	—N/a	Television movie
1998	Dancer, Texas Pop. 81	Mr. Lusk	
1999	The Mod Squad	Detective Carl Greene	
1999	A.T.F.	Ben Walker	Television movie, Assistant Director
1999	The Legend of Bagger Vance	O.B. Keeler	
2000	Traffic	Lawyer Rodman	
2002	The Board Room	Walters	
2003	Dreamcatcher	Lieutenant General Matheson	
2003	Seabiscuit	Mr. Pollard	
2003	Secondhand Lions	Ralph	
2004	American Crime	Sheriff Smyth	Direct-to-video
2004	Around the Bend	Cowboy	
2007	Transformers	Tom Banachek	
2007	Across the Universe	Lucy and Max's uncle at dinner	
2007	Crazy	Ralph Christianson	
2008	A Quiet Little Marriage	Bruce	
2010	Green Zone	Colonel Bethel	
2011	J. Edgar	Senator Kenneth McKellar	
2013	Dallas Buyers Club	FDA Agent Richard Barkley	
2018	Danger One	Beckwith	
2019	Clemency	David Kendricks	
2023	Air	Joe Dean	
2025	Bride Hard	Frank	
2025	War of the Worlds	Walter Crystal	

=== Television ===
Year	Title	Role	Notes
1990	H.E.L.P.	Cabot	Episode: "Are You There, Alpha Centauri?"
1992	L.A. Law	Mr. Moran	Episode: "My Friend Flicker"
1994	Picket Fences	Prosecutor Larry Adler	Episode: "System Down"
1995	Days of Our Lives	Father Jansen	3 Episodes: #1.7435, #1.7442, and #1.7504
1995	One West Waikiki	—N/a	Episode: "Manpower"
1996	The Cape	Keith Mason	Episode: "The Need to Know"
1997	The Pretender	Police Captain Harrigan	Episode: "The Better Part of Valor"
1997	Millennium	County Prosecutor Calvin Smith	Episode: "Covenant"
1997	Orleans	—N/a	Episode: "Luther's Temptation"
1997	The Shining	Dr. Daniel Edwards	Episode: "#1.2"
1998	The X-Files	The Patrol Captain	Episode: "Drive"
1999	Roswell	Phillip Evans	Episode: "The Morning After"
1999	JAG	Commander Bradley	Episode: "Shakedown"
1999–2006	The West Wing	Secret Service Agent Ron Butterfield	15 episodes
2000	Chicago Hope	Bill Wyzinski	Episode: "Everybody's Special at Chicago Hope"
2001	NYPD Blue	Captain Chuck Dowling	Episode: "Peeping Tommy"
2001	Diagnosis: Murder	Sheriff Buck O'Hara	Episode: "No Good Deed"
2001	24	Richard Walsh	2 Episodes: ("12:00 a.m. – 1:00 a.m.") and ("1:00 a.m. – 2:00 a.m.")
2001–2002	Boston Public	Dr. Bernard Colbert	4 episodes
2002	Ally McBeal	Dr. Colbert	Episode: "All of Me"
2002	Without a Trace	Thomas Shannon	Episode: "Silent Partner"
2003	Presidio Med	—N/a	Episode: "Breathless"
2003	Carnivàle	Sheriff Lyle Donovan	Episode: "Tipton"
2004	The Practice	Judge Robert Temple	Episode: "Police State"
2004	Judging Amy	District Attorney Dave Sherman	Episode: "My Little Runaway"
2004	Crossing Jordan	Chris Benz	Episode: "Out of Sight"
2004	LAX	Alonso Mathews	Episode: "Unscheduled Arrivals"
2005	Boston Legal	Dr. Robert McLean	Episode: "It Girls and Beyond"
2005	Cold Case	Warren Cousins (2005)	Episode: "Revolution"
2005	ER	Colonel Ken Kilner	Episode: "Here and There"
2005	Commander in Chief	Congressman Wilcox	Episode: "First Strike, First Scandal"
2005	JAG	Major General Harold Rossing	Episode: "Fair Winds and Following Seas"
2006	Close to Home	Don Wheeler	Episode: "The Rapist Next Door"
2006	3 lbs	James Wills	Episode: "Lost for Words"
2006–2007	The Unit	Ron Cheals	6 episodes
2006–2007	The Nine	Pete Burton	3 episodes
2007	Lincoln Heights	Captain	Episode: "Suspicion"
2007	K-Ville	Father Dennehy	Episode: "Critical Mass"
2007	Criminal Minds	Detective Yarbough	Episode: "About Face"
2008	Women's Murder Club	FBI Special Agent Ted Thorne	Episode: "Never Tell"
2008	The Mentalist	Sheriff Nelson	Episode: "Redwood"
2008	Prison Break	Herb Stanton	3 episodes
2008	My Own Worst Enemy	Alexander DeSantos	Episode: "Love in All the Wrong Places"
2008	Leverage	Judge Roy	Episode: "The Bank Shot Job"
2009	FlashForward	CIA Director Keller	Episode: "Gimme Some Truth"
2009	Ghost Whisperer	Male Ghost	Episode: "Ghost Busted"
2009	Army Wives	Reverent Bankerd	2 episodes
2009	Sons of Anarchy	Judge Franklin	Episode: "Fa Guan"
2010	Numb3rs	Boyd Keene	Episode: "Scratch"
2010	Fringe	Sheriff Velchik	Episode: "Johari Window"
2010	Miami Medical	Dr. Bruce Kaye	2 episodes
2010	Grey's Anatomy	Gary Clark	4 episodes
2010–2012	NCIS	Former NCIS Special Agent Riley McCallister	3 episodes
2012	Vegas	Mayor Ted Bennett	4 episodes
2012	CSI: Miami	Jerry Blackburn	Episode: "Friendly Fire"
2013–2016	Rectify	Senator Roland Foulkes	15 episodes
2014	Bates Motel	Nick Ford	8 episodes
2014	Extant	Alan Sparks	12 episodes
2015	Battle Creek	Councilman Pritchett	Episode: "Old Wounds"
2015	Manhattan	Psychiatrist	Episode: "The Threshold"
2016	11.22.63	Arliss Price	Episode: "The Kill Floor"
2017–2023	S.W.A.T.	Carl Luca	Episodes: "Homecoming", "Inheritance" & "Last Call"
2018	Shooter	Ray Brooks	3 episodes
2018	Scandal	Lonnie Mencken	3 episodes
2018	The Resident	Joshua Williams	Episode: "And the Nurses Get Screwed"
2018	The Romanoffs	Ron Hopkins	Episode: "Expectation"
2019	Jack Ryan	Senator Mitchell Chapin	5 episodes
2020	Council of Dads	Larry Mills	Main role; 10 episodes
2020	Messiah	Cameron Collier	Episode: "Trial"
2021	This Is Us	Arlo	Episode: "In The Room"
2022	Echoes	Victor McCleary	7 episodes
2022	Fire Country	Harlen Denbo	1 episode: "Two Pink Lines"
2024	Outer Range	Judge Pettigrew	2 episodes: "Everybody Hurts" and "Do-Si-Do"
2024	Happy's Place	Jim Jackoway	2 episodes
2025	Happy Face	D.A. Craig Calloway	5 episodes
2026	Tracker	Buck Avery	Episode: "Alaskan Wild"
