= Kylie Shea =

American ballet dancer (born 1986)

Kylie Shea Lewallen (born May 6, 1986), known professionally as Kylie Shea, is an American ballet dancer. She is a former principal dancer with Spectrum Dance Theater.

== Biography ==
Lewallen was born on May 6, 1986, in Los Angeles, California. She is the younger sister of Scott Lewallen, an actor and co-founder of Grindr. She started training in classical ballet when she was eight years old at Dance Peninsula Ballet. She was a member of her high school's dance team, serving as captain her junior and senior years. She moved to Seattle, where she was a principal dancer with Spectrum Dance Theater for four years. She retired from the classical stage and moved back to Los Angeles to pursue a career as a commercial dancer.

Lewallen has been featured in the American television series Glee and in Bruno Mars' music video for his song "Gorilla" as a dancer. She has also performed live with Mars, Ariana Grande, and Adam Lambert. In May 2018 she starred in a music video for the song "Remind Me to Forget" by Kygo and Miguel.

In June 2016 Lewallen founded #PointeChronicles, a ballet improvisation project on social media platforms. In February 2018 she spoke out about the importance of body positivity in the dance industry.

She is the author of a children's book, Save Your Tears For the Stage. She also is the creator and designer behind F'Lingerie, a line of lingerie.

Lewallen danced with Rob McElhenney in a five-minute-long contemporary dance work in the 2018 episode "Mac Finds His Pride", of the American sitcom It's Always Sunny in Philadelphia.

Kylie Shea appears in 2023 movie Magic Mike's Last Dance.
