= Mae Laborde =

American actress (1909–2012)

- Born: Mae Shamlian; May 13, 1909; Fresno, California, U.S.
- Died: January 9, 2012 (aged 102); Santa Monica, California, U.S.
- Resting place: Inglewood Park Cemetery
- Occupations: TV actress, entertainer
- Years active: 2002–2012
- Spouse: Nicholas Laborde (m. 1930; died 1980)

Mae Laborde (May 13, 1909 – January 9, 2012) was an American television and film actress, who began her acting career at the age of 93 and who was active until her death at age 102. She was best known for her appearances on Talkshow with Spike Feresten as well as portraying Gladys on It's Always Sunny in Philadelphia and Mrs. Mendelson in Pineapple Express (2008).

== Background ==
Born in 1909 to Armenian parents Paul and Fereday Shamlian, in Fresno, Laborde arrived in Los Angeles at the height of the Great Depression. She met her husband, Nicholas Laborde, when he was the conductor on Los Angeles' old Red Car trolley line that she took home from work. She worked throughout her life, including a stint as a bookkeeper for Lawrence Welk.

She began acting in 2002, aged 93. She was also the subject of the featured article on Yahoo! on March 30, 2007. She appeared frequently on Talkshow with Spike Feresten. Although not an acting gig, she appeared as an interviewee in the 1998 KCET production of More Things That Aren't Here Anymore, hosted by veteran broadcaster Ralph Story.

In 2006, she appeared as Rosemary in the stoner horror film Evil Bong; ironically, she appears in a behind-the-scenes interview expressing disapproval of cannabis use.

In 2007, she appeared in The Heartbreak Kid.

In 2008, Laborde appeared in the TV show It's Always Sunny in Philadelphia as Gladys for the episodes "The Nightman Cometh" and "The D.E.N.N.I.S. System".

On February 21, 2009, at 99 years old, she was awarded an honorary DTV converter box on Feresten's show in recognition of a comedy sketch she appeared in parodying the difficulties of installing a DTV converter box. Laborde died in 2012, aged 102, in Santa Monica, where she had lived for more than 80 years.

== Family ==
Laborde outlived both her husband, Nicholas, and only child, Mrs. Shirley Miller.
