= Mary Elizabeth Ellis =

American actress (born 1979)

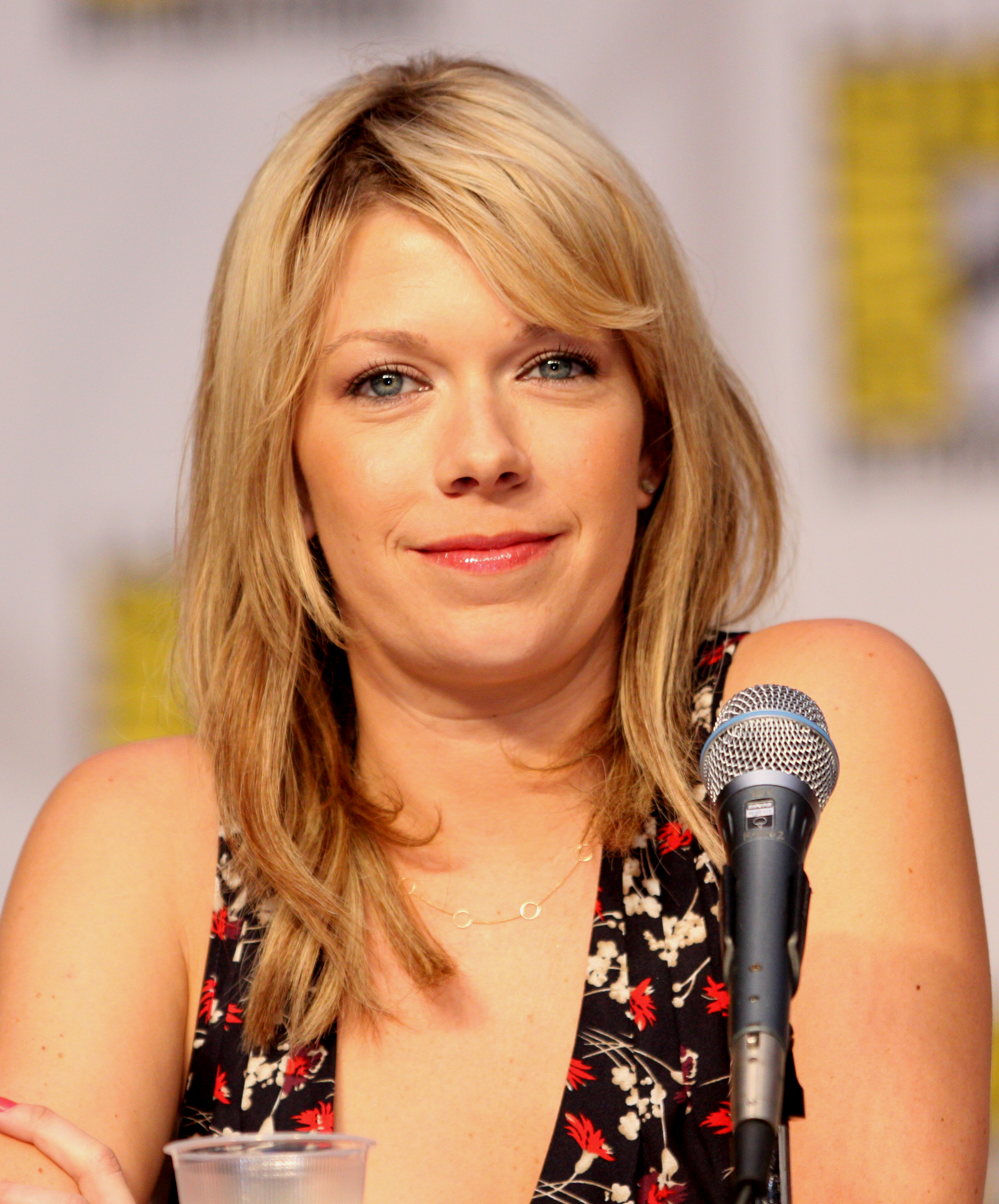
- Ellis at the 2010 San Diego Comic-Con
- Born: May 11, 1979 (age 47); Laurel, Mississippi, U.S.
- Education: Southern Methodist University
- Occupation: Actress
- Years active: 2001–present
- Spouse: Charlie Day (m. 2006)
- Children: 1

Mary Elizabeth Ellis (born May 11, 1979) is an American actress. She is best known for her recurring roles as The Waitress on the FX comedy It's Always Sunny in Philadelphia (2005–present), Caroline in the Fox sitcom New Girl (2011–2018), and Lisa Palmer on the Netflix horror-comedy Santa Clarita Diet (2017–2019). She starred as Amy in the short-lived NBC sitcom Perfect Couples (2010–2011) and Debbie Sanderson in the Fox sitcom The Grinder (2015–2016). More recently, she played Anita in Licorice Pizza (2021), directed by Paul Thomas Anderson.

== Early life and education ==
Mary Elizabeth Ellis was born on May 11, 1979, in Laurel, Mississippi.

She graduated from Southern Methodist University in 2001.

== Career ==
=== Television and film ===
Since the first season of the FX/FXX comedy series It's Always Sunny in Philadelphia began airing in 2005, Ellis has been mostly known for her role as The Waitress.

In 2008, she co-wrote and starred as Olive in the independent film A Quiet Little Marriage. Ellis was a series regular on the NBC romantic comedy series Perfect Couples, which ran for one season in 2011.

In 2015, she got her first main role as Debbie Sanderson, co-starring with Fred Savage and Rob Lowe in The Grinder. In 2020, she appeared in Disney's Godmothered. The next year, she appeared in Licorice Pizza (2021) as Momma Anita.

Ellis has appeared in a number of other television series, including Reno 911!, House M.D., Without a Trace, Cold Case, New Girl, Happy Endings, and Netflix's Santa Clarita Diet. In 2024 she appeared in A Man on the Inside as Ted Danson's daughter. The series was renewed for a second season, which was released in November 2025.

=== Stage ===
Ellis and her It's Always Sunny colleague Artemis Pebdani were as of 2011 members of the Los Angeles-based performance group Discount Cruise to Hell. Together, they wrote and starred in the stage show Mother May I Dance with Mary Jane's Fist?: A Lifetime Original Play at the Upright Citizens Brigade Theater in Los Angeles. The stage show was later adapted to TV for Adult Swim in 2018.

=== Music videos ===
She has also appeared music videos, including "Diaper Money" (2013) for The Lonely Island, and "Anti-Hero" (2022) for Taylor Swift.

== Personal life ==
Ellis and Charlie Day met in 2001 and began dating immediately. They were married on March 4, 2006. Their son was born in 2011.

The couple have an extensive history of appearing on shows together. In 2004, they auditioned together as incestuous siblings for Reno 911! and landed the roles. Around the same time, Ellis also began playing The Waitress in home movies Day was making. The films became the pilot episode of It's Always Sunny in Philadelphia in 2005, in which Ellis stars.

== Filmography ==
Key
†	Denotes works that have not yet been released

=== Film ===
Year	Title	Role	Notes
2008	A Quiet Little Marriage	Olive	Also writer
2009	Pulling	Karen	
2014	The Last Time You Had Fun	Alison	
2016	Free State of Jones	Margaret	
2016	Masterminds	Michelle Chambers	
2018	The Truth About Lies	Sharon	
2020	Godmothered	Paula Walsh	
2021	How It Ends	Krista	
2021	Licorice Pizza	Momma Anita	
2023	Fool's Paradise	Makeup Woman #1	
2024	Red One	Olivia	
2024	Last to Leave	Blonde	Short film. Also director and writer

=== Television ===
Year	Title	Role	Notes
2004	Cracking Up	Jennifer	Episode: "Panic House"
2004	Reno 911!	Inbred Twin	Episode: "Not Without My Mustache"
2005–present	It's Always Sunny in Philadelphia	The Waitress	35 episodes
2006	House	Sophie	Episode: "Que Será Será"
2007	Without a Trace	Sally Price	Episode: "Skin Deep"
2009	Old Friends	Portia Bridges	Episode: "Introductions"
2009	Cold Case	Shelly Reid	Episode: "Lotto Fever"
2010–2011	Perfect Couples	Amy	11 episodes
2011–2014	New Girl	Caroline	6 episodes
2012	Georgia	Georgia	3 episodes
2012	Up All Night	Connie Chafin	2 episodes
2012–2013	Happy Endings	Daphne Wilson	2 episodes
2013	The Millers	Debbie	Unaired pilot
2013	Brooklyn Nine-Nine	Dr. Rossi	Episode: "M.E. Time"
2014–2016	Comedy Bang! Bang!	Various	2 episodes
2015	Drunk History	Dorothy Fuldheim	Episode: "Cleveland"
2015–2016	The Grinder	Debbie Sanderson	22 episodes
2017	Animals.	Wendy (voice)	Episode: "Roaches"
2017–2019	Santa Clarita Diet	Lisa Palmer	15 episodes
2019	The Cool Kids	M.J.	Episode: "Margaret Jr."
2019	Bajillion Dollar Propertie$	Wivian Turnter	Episode: "Love Is the Most Dangerous Game"
2019	Lodge 49	Daphne Larson	5 episodes
2023	Unstable	Barbie	Episode: "A Dragon's Fire"
2024	It's Florida, Man	Mia	Episode: "Mermaids"
2024–present	A Man on the Inside	Emily	16 episodes
2024–2025	After Midnight	Herself/Guest	2 episodes
2025	Bob's Burgers	Penelope (voice)	Episode: "Get Her to the Zeke"
2026	Celebrity Wheel of Fortune	Self - Contestant	Episode: "TV Drama & Sitcom Vets"

=== Web ===
Year	Title	Role	Notes
2022	The Always Sunny Podcast	Herself/Guest	1 episode

=== Music videos ===
Year	Artist	Title	Album	Notes
2013	The Lonely Island	"Diaper Money"	The Wack Album	
2022	Ben Abraham	"If I Didn't Love You"	Friendly Fire	Co-starred with Charlie Day
2022	Taylor Swift	"Anti-Hero"	Midnights	Role: Kimber, the future daughter-in-law

== Theatre ==
Year	Title	Role	Venue
2001	The Tempest	Ariel	PCPA Theaterfest
2002	Killer Joe	Dotty	Artists Repertory Theatre Portland
2009	The Nightman Cometh	The Waitress	The Troubadour
2015	Trevor	Ashley	Circle X Theatre Co.
