= Charlie Kelly (character) =

"It's Always Sunny in Philadelphia" character

- It's Always Sunny in Philadelphia character
- First appearance: "The Gang Gets Racist" (2005)
- Created by: Charlie Day; Glenn Howerton; Rob McElhenney
- Portrayed by: Charlie Day

In-universe information
- Gender: Male
- Occupation: Co-owner and janitor at Paddy's Pub
- Family: Shelley Kelly (biological father); Bonnie Kelly (mother); Jack Kelly (uncle); Bunny and Candy (sisters)

Charlie Kelly is a fictional character and one of the five main characters on the American sitcom It's Always Sunny in Philadelphia. Portrayed by Charlie Day, he debuted in the pilot episode "The Gang Gets Racist". Charlie is a co-owner of Paddy's Pub alongside Mac and Dennis, co-worker of Dee, and the roommate of Frank Reynolds. Together, the group are often collectively known as the "Gang".

Charlie works as the janitor and handyman for the bar, doing menial work named "Charlie work" by the other members of the gang. Charlie is depicted as naive, uneducated, and in poor physical and mental health, but also as idealistic and positive.

== Creation and development ==
Charlie Kelly was one of the original four characters created for the show and was portrayed by Charlie Day from the pilot episode. Day, alongside Glenn Howerton (Dennis) and Rob McElhenney (Mac), became writers and executive producers for the show when it was picked up by FX.

Charlie Day considered leaving the show to focus on starring in films, but ultimately decided to stay.

== Fictional character biography ==
=== Background ===
Charlie Kelly was born to Bonnie and Shelley Kelly. His father is an Irish man that was entirely absent from Charlie's life, except for being a pen pal to his son, with Charlie not knowing the identity of his pen pal. Charlie's mother was promiscuous during his childhood, often being hinted she was a prostitute. It is also hinted that his uncle Jack attempted to molest him.

Charlie befriended Mac, Dennis, and Dee during his school years. He was bullied throughout school, and didn't perform well academically, leading to his adult illiteracy. While working at a roller rink, Charlie bought Paddy's Pub alongside Mac and Dennis. This is where he also got addicted to inhalants.

=== During the series ===
Throughout the series, Charlie is often manipulated by the other members of the group due to his innocent nature and lack of intelligence. He performs menial labour, dubbed "Charlie work", in the bar due to the other characters not wanting to do the tasks. He lives in near squalor and does not care for his physical or mental health, often eating strange foods such as cat food, and making regular use of inhalants such as glue or paint to get high. He is illiterate, but is able to understand Irish and is exceptionally talented musically, able to perform piano and he wrote his own musical, The Nightman Cometh. As well as his musical pursuits, Charlie has been portrayed as a creative eccentric, such as in his Dream Journal, his choice of hobbies, and his many personas, including Green Man.

Charlie moves in with Frank Reynolds, the new addition to the gang. He quickly develops a strong relationship with Frank, and it is heavily implied that Frank is his biological father. Frank dates Charlie's mother Bonnie on-and-off throughout the show.

Charlie has an infatuation with the waitress, a woman he went to high school with and who is disgusted by Charlie and his actions towards her. Nothing deters Charlie from pursuing her, stalking her and even breaking into her home. The waitress is portrayed by Day's wife, Mary Elizabeth Ellis. Charlie’s obsession with the waitress later dies down in season 12, after convincing her to sleep with him, by telling her she is getting older and running out of time to start a family (while suggesting Frank could pay for it). After sleeping with the waitress, Charlie quickly gets tired of her annoyance and dependancy, and immediately loses interest after stalking her for over 12 years.

In season 15, the gang visits Ireland and Charlie's biological father Shelley is revealed. Charlie reconnects with his father, but Shelley dies soon after and Charlie throws his body from a cliff, due to a family tradition.

== Reception ==
- Paste ranked Charlie Kelly 8th in "The 20 Best TV Characters of 2011"
