= List of It's Always Sunny in Philadelphia characters =

The following is a list of recurring characters from the FX television series It's Always Sunny in Philadelphia.

== Main characters ==
Reynolds family tree

Henrich Landgraf	Mrs. Landgraf	Grandma Reynolds	Grandpa Reynolds	Grandma Kelly	Grandpa Kelly
Max	Aunt Donna Landgraf	Mr. Ponderosa	Mrs. Ponderosa	Bruce Mathis (Note: In "Dennis and Dee Get a New Dad" (2006), Dennis and Dee learn that they are the biological children of Bruce Mathis, a wealthy, kind-hearted philanthropist with whom their mother Barbara Reynolds had an affair.)	Barbara Landgraf	Frank Reynolds	Bonnie Kelly	Shelley Kelly (Note: In "The Gang's Still in Ireland" (2021), Charlie Kelly learns that his biological father is his lifelong Irish pen pal Shelley Kelly, instead of Frank Reynolds as he had previously thought since "Dennis and Dee Get a New Dad" (2006).)	Gino Reynolds
Jane	Bill Ponderosa	Maureen Ponderosa (Note: In "Mac Fights Gay Marriage" (2010), Dennis Reynolds and Maureen Ponderosa briefly marry, before divorcing in "Dennis Gets Divorced" (2010), with Maureen later dying in "Making Dennis Reynolds a Murderer" (2017).)	Dennis Reynolds	Mandy	Deandra "Sweet Dee" Reynolds	Jack Kelly
Gail "the Snail"	Emily Ponderosa	Bobby Ponderosa	Brian LeFevre, Jr. (Note: In "Dennis' Double Life" (2017), Dennis Reynolds is revealed to have a son with the woman he had sex with during his North Dakota layover on "The Gang Beats Boggs" (2015), named "Brian LeFevre, Jr." after his "Brian LeFevre" alias.)	Ronald "Mac" McDonald (Note: The son of Mrs. and Luther Mac, Mac is adopted by Frank in "The Gang Goes on Family Fight" (2015) so he can be a part of their Family Fight team, due to both mistakenly believing all team members have to be related.)	"Bunny" Kelly	"Candy" Kelly	Charles "Charlie" Kelly	The Waitress

=== Charlie Kelly ===
Charlie Kelly is a co-owner of Paddy's Pub. He also works there as a janitor, cleaning and doing other unpleasant tasks which is referred to by the gang as "Charlie Work". He is a childhood friend of Mac and a high school friend of Dennis. Frank is his roommate, and until "The Gang's Still in Ireland", he was heavily implied to be Charlie's biological father. Charlie is illiterate (although he can read Irish), although he repeatedly denies this, and he is generally unstable and in poor mental health. He often becomes frustrated and begins screaming when he cannot get his point across. Like the rest of the gang, he is an alcoholic, and also a chronic user of inhalants. He is possibly the least intelligent member of the gang, but he is also a talented pianist and singer, and he is capable of dealing with problems that the rest of the gang ignores; in the season 10 episode "Charlie Work", he executes an intricate plan to help Paddy's pass a health inspection despite the bar's terrible conditions. He often disregards the gang's attempts to control his dysfunctional behavior. While Charlie is generally portrayed as innocent, idealistic, and nicer than the rest of the gang, he is usually just as selfish, ignorant, and chaotic as the others. Charlie is portrayed by Charlie Day.

=== Mac ===
Mac is Charlie's childhood friend and the roommate of Dennis, whom he met in high school. He is a co-owner of Paddy's Pub and, supposedly, its bouncer. He often brags about his strength, athletic ability, and incredible martial arts prowess, even though he lacks any real skill or even a proper sense of balance. Mac's father Luther is a violent convicted felon who withholds affection from his son. Consequently, Mac tends to seek approval from others. Mac is the most self-deluded member of the gang, clinging onto many fantasies, such as being tough, loved by everyone, and a good Catholic. He ignores the gang's attempts to explain otherwise.

His full name is revealed to be Ronald McDonald in the seventh-season episode "The High School Reunion". It is heavily implied throughout the early series that Mac is gay and in denial about it; he momentarily comes out of the closet in season 11, and again in season 12, although this time permanently. Mac is portrayed by Rob McElhenney.

=== Dennis Reynolds ===
Dennis Reynolds is Dee's twin brother and a co-owner of Paddy's Pub, where he is a bartender. He is superficial, manipulative, and incredibly narcissistic, flaws perpetuated by his Ivy League education at Penn. Several episodes have implied that he is a rapist and a serial killer, and in one episode he was diagnosed with borderline personality disorder. Dennis's sense of self-worth is entirely dependent on what others think of his appearance, and he habitually manipulates women into casual sex using what he calls "the D.E.N.N.I.S. system", a parody of pickup artist techniques. He sometimes refers to himself as "The Golden God". Outwardly, Dennis appears more composed than the rest of the gang and usually acts as the voice of reason. However, when he is made to feel insecure or weak in any way, he tends to violently lash out and descend into screaming fits, often going to extreme lengths to retaliate against others for any perceived slight.

Dennis is a fan of the music of Rick Astley, Bryan Adams, and Steve Winwood. He is portrayed by Glenn Howerton.

=== Deandra "Sweet Dee" Reynolds ===
Deandra Reynolds (usually called Dee or Sweet Dee) is Dennis's twin sister, the other bartender at Paddy's Pub, and the show's main female character. She is self-absorbed, shallow, petty, and the subject of bullying by the other members of the gang, who call her "bird" in reference to her supposedly ugly, bird-like appearance. They often do not treat her as one of the gang, but rather just someone who works for them. Despite the gang's awful treatment of her, she still involves herself in their schemes.

Dee dreams of becoming an actress and comedian even though she has no experience or talent; in the season 7 episode "Sweet Dee Gets Audited", a scheme involving a fake funeral goes wrong because Dee cannot cry on cue, requiring Dennis to blow chili powder into her eyes. She also suffers from crippling stage fright, and when attempting to perform stand-up comedy, she begins dry heaving before she can deliver the punchline. Like her brother, Dee is egotistical and believes that she is talented and popular, although she is constantly told otherwise. Dee is portrayed by Kaitlin Olson.

=== Frank Reynolds ===
Frank Reynolds is the legal (but not biological) father of Dennis and Dee. In season 13, his expired driver's license displays his date of birth as July 31, 1943. Frank is wealthy and was formerly a successful businessman, but his enterprises are generally very sleazy or even illegal, including sweat shops, drug-dealing, and working for Jeffrey Epstein "on the sex island" to score discounted snorkeling.

In season 2, Frank buys 51% of Paddy's Pub, and afterwards makes a majority of the business decisions at the bar and also funds the gang's schemes. Despite having enough money to live comfortably, he chooses to live with Charlie in a disgusting apartment in order to make his life more interesting following his split from his ex-wife Barbara, whom he frequently refers to as "my whore wife". Frank's lifestyle involves eating cat food, using a "toe knife", living on about five dollars a week (not counting his morning cocaine routine), keeping a mini meat fridge in his apartment as well as sausages in his shirt pocket, and sharing a bed (which is also their couch) with Charlie.

He is the only member of the gang to frequently involve himself with politics, often ranting about the government. He does not trust psychiatrists, and was admitted into a school for clinically insane children for a short while as a child before he was cleared of any legal mental issues, having received a certificate stating that he did not have "donkey brains". He is frequently seen in strip clubs and sleeping with prostitutes (even proposing marriage to a "crack whore" in the season 7 premiere). Frank is portrayed by Danny DeVito.

== Recurring characters ==
Character	Actor	Seasons																	
Character	Actor	1	2	3	4	5	6	7	8	9	10	11	12	13	14	15	16	17	18
The Waitress	Mary Elizabeth Ellis	Recurring	Recurring	Recurring	Recurring	Recurring	Recurring	Recurring	G	R	G	R	G	R	G	R	G	R	R
Ernie	David Zdunich	Recurring	Recurring	Recurring	Recurring	Recurring													
Bonnie Kelly	Lynne Marie Stewart	G	Recurring	Recurring	G	Recurring	Recurring		G		R		Guest	Guest			R	G	
Liam McPoyle	Jimmi Simpson	Guest	Guest	R			G		Guest	Guest							G		G
Ryan McPoyle	Nate Mooney	Guest	Guest	R			G		Guest	Guest							G		G
Artemis Dubois	Artemis Pebdani	Guest	Guest	Guest	Recurring	Recurring	Recurring	Guest	Guest	R		G		G		Guest	Guest	Guest	R
Carmen	Brittany Daniel	G		G			R												
Jack Kelly	Andrew Friedman	G				Guest	Guest			G		Guest	Guest	R			R	G	R
Barbara Reynolds	Anne Archer		R																
Matthew "Rickety Cricket" Mara	David Hornsby		G	Recurring	Recurring	G	Recurring	Recurring	Guest	Guest	R	G	Recurring	Recurring	Recurring		Guest	Guest	R
Mrs. Mac	Sandy Martin		G	R	Guest	Guest	R		G		R		Guest	Guest		G	R		R
Margaret McPoyle	Thesy Surface		G	R			G		G			G							
Luther Mac (Note: Cummins also portrays Donald McDonald in seasons 16 and 18.)	Gregory Scott Cummins		Guest	Guest	R		G				G		Guest	Guest			G		G
The Lawyer	Brian Unger			G		R	G		G			G						G	
The Waiter	Michael Naughton				G			G		R			R	G					
Rex	T.J. Hoban				G		G			Guest	Guest			R					
Gail the Snail	Mary Lynn Rajskub					G				G				G			G		G
Ben the Soldier	Travis Schuldt					Recurring	Recurring			G				R					
Maureen Ponderosa	Catherine Reitman						Recurring	Recurring	G		Guest (Note: In season 12, Ponderosa appears only as a corpse and is portrayed by an uncredited extra.)	Guest	Guest						
Bill Ponderosa	Lance Barber						R		Guest	Guest	Guest	R	G	R					
Z	Chad L. Coleman						R			G			G		G				
Chet Wallum	Bob Wiltfong									Guest	Guest		G		R		Guest	Guest	Guest
Old Black Man	Wil Garret											G	R						

=== Artemis Dubois ===
Artemis Dubois (Artemis Pebdani) is one of the more frequently recurring secondary characters, introduced in "Charlie Gets Cancer" as Dee's friend from her acting classes who acts out a scene from Coyote Ugly (a film that featured Kaitlin Olson in a small part). Artemis is the closest thing to a friend that the Gang has, often joining in on their schemes purely to have a good time. She is overly serious about her craft and displays bizarre habits and outbursts. She is very open about her sexuality and often offers to perform in the nude, even when it is unnecessary. She has been involved in a sexual relationship with Frank and the two shared a food fetish. She likes having sex with bacon bits in her hair because it "makes her feel like a Cobb salad." She and Frank once had makeup sex in a dumpster behind Wendy's, where she incorporated a bun. She has openly proclaimed that she has a "bleached asshole". In the season 11 episode "Being Frank" it is shown that Artemis' family is Jewish. In season 15's "The Gang Makes Lethal Weapon 7" Artemis also states that she is of Persian descent (as is Artemis Pebdani in real life).

=== Brad Fisher ===
Brad Fisher (Nick Wechsler) is first introduced as the Waitress' fiancé in the season 5 episode "The Waitress Is Getting Married". Brad dated both Dee and the Waitress in High School but both dumped him because of his acne. He rekindles both relationships in a plot to humiliate them. Charlie gives Brad a wedding gift of a box full of hornets. Brad returns in the season 7 episode "The High School Reunion" where his face is scarred from the hornet stings. He gets "revenge" on Charlie for this by attempting to give him a wedgie when Charlie has passed out from huffing chemicals in a restroom, but is horrified when Charlie's filthy underwear splinters into shreds in his hands.

=== Carmen ===
Carmen (Brittany Daniel) is a trans woman who was dating Mac, she is portrayed by a cis woman. She first appears in the season 1 episode "Charlie Has Cancer", then reappears in the season 3 episode "Mac Is a Serial Killer". She is often shown with a bulge in her pants as a visible indication she is trans. Mac finds her attractive, but regularly displays shame about this because of her gender. Mac shows excitment at the prospect of Carmen undergoing gender-affirming surgery. She flatters Mac with many physical compliments. In "Mac Fights Gay Marriage", she has had reassignment surgery and has married Nick, much to Mac's dismay. In "Dee Gives Birth" it is revealed that Carmen is the parent of Dee's baby (she had her sperm frozen before she had GRS) and that they used an anonymous egg donor and Dee was merely a surrogate. Dee gave the baby to Carmen and her husband Nick to raise. In the unaired pilot, Carmen is portrayed by Morena Baccarin.

=== Duncan & Z ===
Duncan (David Gueriera) and his right-hand man, Z (Chad L. Coleman), are Frank's bizarre friends that he met under a bridge. They appear in "Charlie Kelly: King Of The Rats" where Frank wants the gang to invite them to go to the gang's luau. They later appear in "Dee Gives Birth" to provide music for their party/interrogation of Dee's potential baby's daddies. Z also makes a brief appearance in "The Gang Tries Desperately to Win an Award," as the gang attempts to show that they are a diverse crowd; the episode then makes a pointed reference to the no-Emmy wins-ever show Coleman formerly starred on, The Wire when Dennis flatly states that "black bars don't win awards." Z appeared in the season 12 premiere, "The Gang Turns Black."

=== Da Maniac ===
Da Maniac (Roddy Piper) is a deranged, homeless wrestler. The gang enlists him for their wrestling act in season five, and he drifts into both their timeshare scam and pyramid scheme in season 9, the latter of which he proves surprisingly adept at.

Da Maniac is legitimately disturbed, with Dennis noting that "his mania is NOT confined to the ring." He is seen reacting violently over a fifteen dollar debt, foraging chestnuts for food, and displaying extreme PTSD. When the guys suggest that he adopt a terrorist-themed persona for a match, his response is simply to repeat the phrase "I'm... da Maniac" until it is clear he will not respond to anything else. When asked if he has children, he ominously replies, "Naw... not anymore." He also claims to love the members of the gang, "even with [their] feathers," all while calling Mac the N-word behind his back.

Da Maniac is a wrestler who uses props and has an interest in wrestling trends. In the episode "Mac and Dennis Buy a Timeshare", he works as a salesperson for Invigaron and sells more products than the other distributors.

Piper died in 2015.

=== Ernie ===
Ernie (David Zdunich) is the "Barfly" who is commonly seen in the background in the bar. He is in every single episode that is shot in the bar, but he is noticed in the episode "Paddy's Pub: The Worst Bar in Philadelphia" handing over the paper to the "gang" for them to see the journalist's article. Also, in "Sweet Dee is Dating a Retarded Person" in which he sets up Mac, Frank and Charlie's band equipment. David Zdunich died in 2009. A portrait of Ernie (Zdunich) is hung behind the bar in memoriam.

=== Gladys ===
Gladys (Mae Laborde) is a senior citizen the gang calls upon who has a penchant for long rambling stories. She played the piano during Charlie's play in the season 4 finale "The Nightman Cometh". Dennis pretends she is his grandmother to win back a former girlfriend in "The D.E.N.N.I.S. System". She claims she was friends with Calvin Coolidge and that her grandmother was the lesbian lover of Susan B. Anthony. Laborde died in 2012.

=== Josh Groban ===
Josh Groban (played by himself) is a famous singer. Dee and Artemis are huge Groban fans, calling themselves "Grobanites". Dee's love of the singer leads her to self-tan and wear white shorts, explaining "Josh Groban likes his ladies to pop". Dee and Artemis get backstage passes to a Groban show, but Dee is unable to attend because Frank had poisoned her and tied her up. In the season 9 episode "The Gang Saves the Day," Groban appears in a fantasy of Dee's. In the fantasy, Dee is a celebrity who achieves fame after entering witness protection through her portrayal of an English butler character, in an allusion to the 1980s television series Mr. Belvedere. She marries Groban, but their marriage lasts only 17 minutes with Dee divorcing Groban for Brad Pitt.

=== Jack Kelly ===
Jack Kelly (Andrew Friedman) is Charlie's uncle and a lawyer, he is often referred to as "Uncle Jack" by other members of the gang. He first appeared in the season 1 finale "Charlie Got Molested" wherein Charlie's family gives him an intervention to get him to admit he had been molested by his elementary school teacher, Jack shows out of place excitment during this. Uncle Jack appears again in the season 5 episode "The Great Recession." When Charlie tries to move back in with his mother after Frank kicks him out of their apartment, she reveals that she sublet Charlie's room to Uncle Jack to earn extra money. Jack insists they share the room and spend time wrestling there. In the season 6 episode "Dennis Gets Divorced," Charlie and Frank call in Jack to handle their divorce. Later, Dennis and Mac use him to try to get their apartment back from Dennis' ex-wife, only to find that she hired The Lawyer. Jack proves to be incompetent, getting the apartment back in exchange for Dennis taking his wife's $90,000 debt. Jack has a bizarre fixation on the size of his hands, constantly worrying that they may appear to be too small. It is heavily implied that Uncle Jack is a pedophile and has molested Charlie, often making odd remarks towards his nephew. Charlie has mentioned how, as a child, he would stay awake at night because Uncle Jack would want to sleep in his bed. Coincidentally, Charlie's lyrics to "Nightman" seem to revolve around a man sneaking into his room at night and raping him. In season 13's "Time's Up For The Gang" Charlie denies he was molested by Uncle Jack.

=== The Lawyer ===
The Lawyer (Brian Unger) is a recurring character first seen in "Dennis and Dee's Mom Is Dead", where he is the executor of Barbara Reynolds' will. Dennis, Dee and Frank believe Barbara's bequests are the lawyer's personal decisions, and also believe he can communicate with Barbara. He returns in season 5, eager to personally stop Frank—he represents a family that Frank is trying to force out of their house. After Charlie makes an attempt to prove that he is more legally apt than the actual lawyer, he challenges him to a duel; the lawyer immediately accepts, claiming to have a loaded gun in his office desk. He also appears again in "Paddy's Pub: Home of the Original Kitten Mittens" when the gang goes to him to get patents for products that they have created. He later tricks them into signing a document that grants him all the profits from the products as well as imposing a restraining order on them. He is also present at the end of "Dennis Gets Divorced" where he works pro-bono for Maureen Ponderosa, securing a deal with Charlie's Uncle Jack Kelly, who is a lawyer, where Dennis can keep his apartment in exchange for assuming $90,000 of Maureen's debt. In season 11, he represents one of the McPoyles in a lawsuit against Bill Ponderosa over a bird attack that cost his client an eye, but in addition to being hit with nonsensical anti-Semitic baiting from Frank and Dee (despite not being Jewish), he ends up injuring one of his eyes in another bird attack that leads to Bill's acquittal. The Lawyer appears in season 17, undergoing more physical injuries thanks the antics of the gang.

=== Lil Kev ===
Kevin Gallagher (Kyle Davis) a popular local rapper who is possibly mentally disabled. He is introduced as Dee's boyfriend in "Sweet Dee Is Dating A Retarded Person," where the gang makes ableist assumptions toward him. Dennis convinces Dee to dump Kevin because he is disabled, only for her to later decide he is not. He later returns as one of Dee's baby's potential fathers in "Dee Gives Birth".

=== Korean Busboy ===
The Korean Busboy (Maxie J. Santillan Jr.) worked at the Korean restaurant that threatened to steal business away from Paddy Pub's in "The Gang Solves The North Korea Situation". Dee sleeps with him to get information about their secret microbrew recipe. He gives her a note written in Korean purportedly containing the recipe, but when the gang has it translated it turns out to read "Bony American is dirty dirty whore. She bring much shame to herself and country." He later returns as one of Dee's potential baby's fathers in "Dee Gives Birth". Santillan died in 2022.

=== Rickety Cricket ===
Matthew Mara, better known as Rickety Cricket, or simply Cricket, (David Hornsby), is a former Catholic priest who becomes defrocked, destitute, abducted, assaulted (both physically and sexually), threatened, hunted, severely injured, and addicted to PCP all directly or indirectly resulting from the influence or actions of the gang. He is arguably the most long-suffering victim of the gang. As a boy he suffered from a medical condition that required the use of very conspicuous complex leg braces which inspired the pejorative nickname "Rickety Cricket". He first appears in "The Gang Exploits a Miracle" where it is revealed that he has continued to harbor a high school crush on Dee (who at the time used an elaborate semi-permanent aluminum medical back brace). He admits he was convinced to eat horse feces for a chance to kiss Dee, which she refused since, as she says, "his breath smelled like shit". Mac and Dennis have been teabagging Cricket at every opportunity since high school. Dennis claims that he has a shoebox full of pictures of him and Mac doing this, and pictures are surfacing on the Internet.

One recurring theme in the series is Cricket's downward spiral and suffering at the hands of the gang; due to them, he leaves the priesthood, supports himself by grifting or panhandling, becomes addicted to PCP and crack cocaine, has his legs broken by members of the Philadelphia Mafia, frequently commits sex acts with dogs, has his throat sliced by Frank in a wrestling match, is hunted by Mac and Dennis for sport, and suffers a gunshot wound in his hand when he is trespassing at Paddy's and Frank accidentally shoots him. He is then left bleeding in the car by Frank and Dee while they go into a store full of hurricane-panicking people, and he ends up driving through the doors of the place and further injuring himself. The wound to his throat was not fatal, but got badly infected, severely damaging his vocal chords and giving him a gravely voice. He has since carried a vendetta against the gang and attempts to get his revenge in various episodes, but consistently fails to do so. He shows up in "Mac's Big Break", when he appears on Dennis and Dee's inaugural podcast, remarking about his life as a homeless person - during this episode he reveals that he stopped believing in God since "a Chinaman stole my kidney". He also shows up in "Dee Gives Birth" because Frank was trying "to cast a wider net" in finding out the identity of Dee's baby's father and he considered Rickety Cricket to be "the wildcard". He shows up at his high school reunion cleaned up, claiming to have returned to being a priest. However, he actually uses the opportunity to steal jewelry from the other alumni. The other alumni mock him and physically eject him when it is discovered he has ringworm, but his rants about how Dee loved and left him leads the cool crowd to reject her. In the season 8 premiere, "Pop–Pop: The Final Solution", he is working at a local pound for community service. He has a new scar over his now-blind left eye, which he says was from a "skirmish" with a stray chocolate lab, in which he paralyzed the dog; later on he makes numerous references to raping and being raped by feral dogs. He claims to be a dog executioner, but then admits he is a janitor.

In season 9, he suffers horrific facial burns when he is locked in Mac and Dennis's apartment during "The Gang Squashes Their Beefs" when a fire breaks out (ironically, he was not even invited because the gang did not consider him someone they had wronged, due to their malicious, narcissistic behavior), leaving the entire left side of his head covered in scar tissue. In season 10, when Charlie and Mac seek him out to help make their old friend Psycho Pete crazy and fun again, he is fully homeless and describes in disgusting detail the sex acts he must perform to earn money for alcohol and other drugs (frequently remarking that it will cost a six pack of beer for him to perform oral sex). Also from season 10 onwards, his crack-addicted life on the streets has resulted in him losing many of his teeth. By seasons 10 and 11, he often casually appears in the bar to use its bathroom to smoke PCP in, and/or to perform sex acts for money. After having half of his head nearly burned off, he also stops giving any thought whatsoever to his physical appearance, with long, filthy, matted hair and scraggly beard. While he occasionally gives himself wipe-down showers in the bar's bathroom, he is almost always covered in an extensive coating of dirt and grime. In the season 11 episode "Dee Made a Smut Film", Cricket says that a cat bit off one of his toes at some point, and describes in exacting detail how he was involved in a dog orgy (almost bragging about it).

Cricket is given his own storyline in the season 12 episode "A Cricket's Tale". In the episode, his father finds him and gives him a chance to turn his life around and work at his company. Cricket accepts the job offer, starts turning his life around, and meets a woman he falls in love with. However, it turns out that Cricket was hallucinating from PCP and that the woman is actually a dog. Dejected, Cricket decides to turn back to his old lifestyle. In the episode, the gang casually mentions that they injected a GPS pet tracking chip into Cricket's body, without his knowledge.

Cricket is now often seen as a supporting character who assists the gang in different situations, usually out of a desperate attempt to survive. Even then, the gang still treats him awfully, such as calling him a street rat, and offering him a bag of lemons after originally offering him money for doing their dirty work.

=== Dr. Larry Meyers ===
Dr. Larry Meyers (René Auberjonois) is the high-school drama teacher who taught Dee. He appeared in "The Gang Gets A New Member", in which Dee and the gang open a time capsule and find a check from Dee to him for a million dollars. Dee goes back to her high school to talk to Dr. Meyers. He tells her that he was an alcoholic and that she must give up. He also reminds her of a musical she was in, Frankenstein. Later he trips and gets injured as a result of Charlie becoming a member of the school's custodial staff and waxing Dr. Meyers's classroom. He does not appear again in the series due to the injury. Dee takes over as a substitute. Auberjonois died in 2019.

=== Principal Brian McIntyre ===
Principal Brian McIntyre (Dave Foley) is the high school principal who hires Dee as a substitute teacher and Charlie as a janitor in "The Gang Gets A New Member". He fires both of them in the next episode "Dee Reynolds: Shaping America's Youth" because Dee took her students on a field trip to Paddy's Pub to watch Mac and Dennis's Lethal Weapon 5 movie and because Charlie's mentoring of a student named Richie led to him dressing up in blackface after watching the movie. The principal laments that he will likely be fired soon due to their shenanigans. Principal McIntyre appears again in the episode "Gun Fever Too: Still Hot", where he is now the principal of a middle school. It is revealed that because of tenure, he was reassigned instead of being terminated.

=== The McPoyles ===
Fraternal twin brothers Liam (Jimmi Simpson) and Ryan McPoyle (Nate Mooney) are creepy-looking, incestuous, former elementary-school classmates of Mac and Charlie. They are introduced in "Charlie Got Molested" in Season 1 when they falsely accuse a former teacher of pedophilia. Charlie and the gang foil their plan and turn them in to the police, which sparks the McPoyles' antipathy toward the Paddy's Pub gang. Their clan is built entirely from inbreeding and Liam and Ryan have an incestuous relationship with each other and their deaf-mute sister Margaret (Thesy Surface). As seen in "The Gang Gets Invincible" in Season 3, they have at least 14 other siblings and family members, who all sport the McPoyle unibrows, acne, and eczema. The most notable relative is Doyle McPoyle (Bob Rusch), an aspiring football player who lost his chance to play for the Philadelphia Eagles when a hallucinating Frank accidentally shot him in the leg.

Later in Season 3, Ryan, Liam, and Margaret get revenge in the episode "The Gang Gets Held Hostage" by faking a raid on the bar. Ryan seems to have an addiction to inhaling Pledge furniture cleaner, and all the McPoyles seem to exclusively drink milk and to prefer warm, clammy conditions, which explains their constant sweaty appearance.

In Season 8, Liam becomes engaged to Maureen Ponderosa in the episode "The Maureen Ponderosa Wedding Massacre", which would break the incestuous bloodline if successful, but the marriage is called off after Dennis sleeps with Maureen. During the wedding Liam loses his right eye in a riot triggered by Bill Ponderosa spiking the McPoyles' milk with bath salts.

Ryan and Liam later reappear in the Season 9 episode "The Gang Squashes Their Beefs" as part of an ensemble invited to Dennis and Mac's apartment to make amends for past transgressions. Liam and Ryan are revealed to be the owners of the very last video rental store in Philadelphia whom accept the Dennis and Mac's invitation to Thanksgiving dinner. During the episode Liam displays immense difficulty adapting to his disability, relying on Ryan for assistance in most situations, as well as wearing a flesh-colored eye-patch and later painting on an eye in the hopes of making his injury less visible. As retribution for Liam's disfigurement the brothers demand a new eye from Dennis and Mac, to no avail. As the episode ends Frank manages to set fire to Dennis and Mac's apartment. The McPoyles along with the other guests are locked inside the burning apartment by the gang but seemingly escape unharmed.

The McPoyle family return in the Season 11 episode "McPoyle vs. Ponderosa: The Trial of the Century", pursuing legal action against Bill Ponderosa for spiking the milk at the wedding and the subsequent mutilation of Liam. Though many members of the family are present at the trial (including Margaret McPoyle) Liam and Ryan do not attend, as it transpires Liam is currently in the hospital having contracted pink eye after pouring "healing milk" into his eye. The case is thrown out of court due to a revelation made by Charlie that the true culprit responsible for Liam's injury was Royal McPoyle, the pet Poconos Swallow of Pappy McPoyle (Guillermo del Toro), who is Liam and Ryan's father and the patriarch of the McPoyle family.

Liam and Ryan make an appearance in the Season 16 episode "The Gang Goes Bowling" where they are revealed to have sold their video store and now own and manage the bowling alley that the gang bowls at during a battle of sexes match between Charlie, Dennis, Mac and Frank against Dee, the Waitress, Artemis and Gail the Snail.

Liam, Ryan and Pappy return in the Season 18 episode "The Gang Goes to the Ren Faire" as the owners of the land the Renaissance Fair takes place on, who force Frank through a series of gruelling challenges in exchange for allowing him to buy the land and transform it into data centers for profit. After Frank chooses Mac as his champion in a jousting duel against Liam, Ryan is convinced to take his place and ultimately loses one of his eyes, resulting in the two brothers matching each other's one-eyed appearance.

=== Ingrid "Fatty Magoo" Nelson ===
Ingrid Nelson AKA Fatty Magoo (Judy Greer) was a high school friend of Dee's who appeared in the season 3 episode "The Aluminum Monster Vs. Fatty Magoo". In High School Dee wore a back brace and was dubbed the Aluminum Monster while Ingrid was morbidly obese and was given the name Fatty Magoo. Dee would always build herself up and put Ingrid down. Ingrid grew up to be a rich and successful fashion designer. Dee, feeling threatened by Ingrid's success, tried to get the gang's help in destroying Ingrid while Dennis tried to sell his dress design to her, even going so far as to wear it himself. Ingrid later returns in the season 7 finale "The High School Reunion: The Gang Gets Revenge" where the gang's efforts to pick on her fail badly: Dee's deranged insults of her just make Ingrid roll her eyes and walk away (and even sociopathic Dennis thinks Dee looked like an idiot there, something Dee silently agrees with) and when Mac and Charlie taunt her for being "fat" she insults them in turn and abruptly cuts off a short conversation, leaving them standing around looking like losers.

=== Gail the Snail ===
Gail (Mary Lynn Rajskub) is Dennis and Dee's disgusting cousin (the daughter of their mother Barbara's sister Donna). Dennis and Dee found the best way to get rid of her is to throw salt at her, hence the nickname. She first appears in Season 5 when Frank goes to her father's funeral and attempts to pick up her mother Donna. Gail gives Frank (her uncle by marriage) a handjob under the table in front of her mother.

In Season 9, Dee later invites Gail, who is now working at a local Wawa convenience store, to a Thanksgiving dinner at Dennis and Mac's apartment to "squash their beefs". Gail is one of the many people the gang leaves in a fire in Mac and Dennis's apartment at the Thanksgiving dinner.

In Season 13, Gail is seen on the same flight as Dee, Artermis, the Waitress, Mrs. Mac, and Bonnie Kelly who are trying to do a lady reboot of a previous episode where the gang tried to outdo Wade Boggs' record of beers drunk on an airplane flight.

In Season 16, Gail appears as part of a bowling team alongside Dee, Artemis and the Waitress in a battle of the sexes bowling match between Dennis, Charlie, Mac and Frank.

In Season 18, Gail appears in the episode 'Frank Marries a Corpse' as one of the bridesmaids alongside Artemis and the Waitress.

=== Nick ===
Nick (Windell Middlebrooks) is Carmen's portly African-American husband. Mac is initially annoyed that Carmen had moved on to Nick instead of calling him after she had her penis removed. Mac does not agree with gay marriage and quotes the Bible verse Romans 1:27 to Nick, to which Nick responds with the Bible quote Exodus 21:20 endorsing slavery. Nick later appears in "Dee Gives Birth" where it is revealed that Dee is a surrogate for the couple since Nick cannot have kids but Carmen had frozen her sperm before her operation. Middlebrooks died in 2015.

=== Bill Ponderosa ===
Bill Ponderosa (Lance Barber) first appears in "Mac Fights Gay Marriage" and the follow-up episode "Dennis Gets Divorced" as Dee's high school crush and the brother of Dennis's high school girlfriend, Maureen Ponderosa. He has put on a lot of weight since high school and become a lecherous drug addict who neglects his family. Dee eventually becomes his mistress when Dee thinks he bought her a new car when in fact the car belongs to another of Bill's mistresses. Bill returns to his wife. Bill later returns in "Dee Gives Birth" as one of Dee's baby's potential fathers. Bill reveals that he tells girls he had a vasectomy to avoid using a condom. He appears in the episode "The Maureen Ponderosa Wedding Massacre", where he spikes a punch bowl with bath salts and it is revealed that Frank is his AA sponsor. He also displays an affinity for cocaine. Ponderosa also appears in the season 11 episode "Being Frank", where it is revealed that he and Frank have developed a friendship based on hard partying and other social activities and that Frank has nicknamed him "Pondy." Frank borrows Ponderosa's car to help the rest of the gang spring Dennis' Land Rover from a city impound lot without paying, dropping Ponderosa off at a roller rink, where he ends up being brutally beaten by a group of men for hitting on underage girls. Ponderosa also makes a brief appearance in the season 12 episode "Making Dennis Reynolds a Murderer", where he implies in an interview that he does not miss his dead sister and that Dennis "did us all a favor. You ever seen a grown woman take a dump in a sandbox?" He states that Dennis did not kill Maureen, who "died three years ago". He killed Bastet, a reference to Maureen having come to identify as a cat and begun transitioning, having renamed herself after the Egyptian cat goddess.

=== Maureen Ponderosa ===
Maureen Ponderosa (Catherine Reitman) is Dennis's high school girlfriend and the sister of Bill Ponderosa. Dennis eventually gets back in touch with Maureen and marries her in "Mac Fights Gay Marriage". She has a dead tooth that makes her breath "smell like she nibbled on little pieces of shit". Dennis gets tired of Maureen fairly quickly and in "Dennis Gets Divorced" she hires the Lawyer as her divorce attorney, ending up in a total demolition of Dennis where he has to assume her tens of thousands of dollars in debt as well as pay her monthly alimony. She later appears in "The High School Reunion" and reveals she is spending her alimony money on a diamond for her dead tooth. Maureen eventually got her dead tooth removed, as well as getting breast implants sometime between Seasons 7 and 8. She became engaged to Liam McPoyle but on the day of the wedding, upon seeing Maureen's new body, Dennis sleeps with her again.

By season 10, Maureen has undergone a series of bizarre plastic surgeries in order to turn herself into a literal "cat lady", and, in Season 11, she says in a courtroom that she wants to be referred to as just a "cat", period. She dies in the Season 12 episode "Making Dennis Reynolds a Murderer", and Dennis is the prime suspect (considering the aftermath of their divorce), until it is revealed neither he nor anyone else murdered her; she was trying to walk along the edge of a roof like a cat and fell off it, landing in an alley headfirst where she broke her neck and died. Despite these revelations, Charlie and Mac try to paint Dennis as the killer via a Making a Murderer-style documentary. However, a comment Dennis makes in the Season 14 episode "Paddy's Has a Jumper" about her being pushed implies that he did indeed kill her. In the Season 16 episode "The Gang Gets Cursed", Dennis also slips up and claims Maureen was murdered, and when Dee accuses him of having done it himself he does not explicitly correct her.

=== Rex ===
Rex (T.J. Hoban) first appears in "America's Next Top Paddy's Billboard Model Contest" as one of the male models vying for the spot on a Paddy's Pub billboard. Although an early favorite of Frank's, eventually Frank himself appears on the billboard. He also appeared in the season 6 episode, "Dee Gives Birth" as a potential father of Dee's baby although it is later revealed that Dee was acting as a surrogate for Carmen and her husband Nick. Rex also appears briefly in the season 9 episode "The Gang Saves the Day" as an angel in part of Mac's fantasy. Rex also made an appearance in the finale of season 10, "Ass Kickers United: Mac and Charlie Join a Cult." Rex also appears in the two-part S13 episodes "Charlie's Home Alone" and "The Gang Wins the Big Game."

=== Peter "Schmitty" Schmidt ===
Peter Schmidt aka Schmitty (Jason Sudeikis) is a former member of the gang back in high school. Mac and Dennis kicked Schmitty out of the gang (and a moving car) to make Charlie happy. Charlie and Schmitty used to be roommates and Charlie always feels upstaged by Schmitty. The gang kicks Charlie out and welcomes Schmitty back in the season 6 episode "The Gang Gets A New Member", but he quickly earns their ire when he upstages Mac and Dennis and is kicked out again. He returns in the season 7 finale "The High School Reunion Part 2: The Gang's Revenge" and appears right at the end of the reunion, seemingly now forgiving the gang, to take the Waitress up on her drunken offer to bang "the next guy who talks to her", right before Charlie can utter a word. His picture is shown on a succession of Christmas cards in the season 18 episode "Mac and Dennis Tear Their ACLs."

=== Ben the Soldier ===
Ben Smith a.k.a. Ben the Soldier (Travis Schuldt) is first introduced in "The Gang Wrestles for the Troops" as Dee's online chat buddy "soldier of fortune". Dim-witted and genial, he served as an American soldier in Iraq. He is mistaken as a disabled person while getting off a bus from the airport in a wheelchair. Unwilling to date a disabled man, Dee reluctantly says he was talking to Artemis over the internet, but she soon discovers he is not actually disabled; he just twisted his knee getting off a plane in Germany. Ben is seen again in the episode "The D.E.N.N.I.S system" as Dee's boyfriend. He dumps her, calling her a "mean person" and goes for a pharmacist that dumped Dennis after the latter "Dennis-ed" her. Ben resurfaces again in season six with the episode "Mac's Big Break." Ben is seen chiefly wearing the jean shorts Frank purchased for him as a welcome-home gift. He appears again in "Dee Gives Birth" as a potential father of Dee's child. He is again seen wearing the jean shorts, and breaks down in tears when discussing Dee's manipulative behavior towards him. He next appears in "Mac & Dennis buy a Timeshare" when the gang attempts to get themselves out of their financial schemes by triggering his PTSD; they discover, however, that he was a computer programmer who never saw actual combat and has no PTSD. In "Charlie's Home Alone" and "The Gang wins the Big Game" he is among the characters that go with the gang to Super Bowl LII.

=== The Unknown Actor ===
The Unknown Actor (Geoffrey Owens) first appears in the episode "The Gang Gets Invincible" when the gang tries out for the Philadelphia Eagles. He pretends to be Donovan McNabb doing a plug for McDonald's but the gang calls him out, recognizing him as "that guy from The Cosby Show" who played "Sondra's husband Alvin." Owens was indeed on The Cosby Show as Sondra's husband Elvin. In the season 7 episode "Frank's Pretty Woman", he appears, claiming to be Tiger Woods paying Frank's hooker girlfriend for her services, revealing that he is into "foot shit." Dee calls him out for not being Tiger Woods and recognizes him as that actor who pretended to be Donovan McNabb. He then claims to be actor Don Cheadle, but she does not believe this either. It is implied that Dee does take him up on his offer to pay her to play with her "bizarrely huge" feet. He also appears in S15 E2, "The Gang Makes Lethal Weapon 7", as an actor playing Murtaugh.

=== The Waitress ===
The Waitress (Mary Elizabeth Ellis) is the most frequently recurring character outside of the gang. Introduced in the first episode, "The Gang Gets Racist", as the object of Charlie's affections, she works at a coffee shop near Paddy's. She has absolutely no interest in Charlie but does have sex with him in season 12 "Dennis' Double Life" and has also slept with Frank and Dennis. She harbors an unrequited crush on Dennis, who slept with her in the episode "Charlie Has Cancer". Attempting to make Dennis jealous, she "banged" Frank in "Mac Bangs Dennis' Mom" and grinds on a homeless man in "The Gang Dances Their Asses Off". She nearly has relations with Mac in "Mac's Banging the Waitress".

In season 7, she spent a night with Charlie at the Jersey Shore while she was high on ecstasy; in the morning she was sickened and left, but Charlie was just happy he got to spend that time with her. Charlie goes to great lengths to woo her, while in earlier seasons she goes to great lengths to attract Dennis' attention. Frequently, her infatuation with Dennis causes her to make decisions against her better moral judgment and often end up the victim of the gang's manipulative schemes. She is a recovering alcoholic, a fact first referenced in "The Gang Gives Back", when she becomes Charlie's Alcoholics Anonymous sponsor, and then in "Who Pooped the Bed", "The Waitress Gets Married", and "The Gang Beats Boggs: Ladies' Reboot".

As a running gag, her real name is never mentioned; she is simply referred to as "The Waitress", and addressed as "Waitress". It was hinted Charlie may know her name in "The Gang Sells Out" when he chides her for liking Dennis when he does not even know her real name. The only clues to her name are that it does not start with "W" and is not "Beautiful", the name Dennis guessed when he was accused of not knowing it. In "The Waitress Is Getting Married", it is revealed that she went to high school with the gang, where she and Dee dated the same guy (a retcon after not knowing Dee when they "first meet" in the second episode of the series). She attends the high-school reunion with the gang, where her name tag is missing (further implying her status as "easily forgettable", a theme in that episode), preventing her name from being revealed. Many fans assumed her name was Nikki Potnick when Frank showed up with a stolen tag bearing that name. However, Glenn Howerton specified on Twitter that this is not the case. Nikki Potnick is mentioned by Charlie in the episode "Underage Drinking: A National Concern" when he reminisces how the gang crashed Potnick's car into a tree during a night of underage drinking.

In a tongue-in-cheek online special feature for season 10, Ellis is filmed making a promotional video and about to reveal her name when Glenn Howerton arrives. Howerton begins to allude to bad things happening to her and when she does not understand, he reveals her real-life husband Charlie Day pointing a sniper rifle at her. She whispers in his ear what she believes to be her name, but Howerton says it is wrong and calls off Charlie. After the men leave, she tried to report the crime but screams when she is asked for her name and does not know it.

== Parents ==
=== Barbara Reynolds ===
Barbara Landgraf Reynolds (Anne Archer) was Frank's gold-digging ex-wife and Dennis and Dee's mother whom Frank always refers to as "my whore wife" who appeared in Season 2. She was a cold, cruel and selfish woman who had no love or affection for her entire family. She is the daughter of Heinrich "Pop-Pop" Landgraf, an SS officer who escaped to America via the ratlines. Barbara tricked Frank into raising the twins, Dennis and Dee, because she thought he was wealthier than their biological father, Bruce Mathis. When she meets Bruce again, she is startled to learn he is actually a wealthy philanthropist. She died off-camera of a botched neck lift operation in the third season. An ecstatic Frank delivers the news of her death to the gang while smoking a cigar and popping a champagne bottle. Frank later maniacally tricks the gang into exhuming her body to teach them a lesson (having convinced them that she had faked her own death and buried her jewelry in her grave), leaving Dee and Dennis horrified.

=== Bruce Mathis ===
Bruce Mathis (Stephen Collins) is Dennis and Dee's biological father. The antithesis of Frank, Bruce devotes his time and money to charities and philanthropic efforts, including adopting several suffering children in Africa. He reconnects with his twins through Dee's MySpace page, but they are unable to have a successful relationship with him because of his good nature clashing with their selfish ways. Bruce had always been wealthy but never mentioned it to Barbara who assumed he was poor and was thus surprised to learn about his wealth years later. After Barbara's death, he inherits Barbara's fortune. He foils Dee and Frank's plan to con him out of the money, and also tricks Dennis into losing Barbara's house, calling his children "monsters who lie, steal, take advantage of people, and contribute absolutely nothing to society."

=== Bonnie Kelly ===
Bonnie Kelly (Lynne Marie Stewart) is Charlie's mom. She is a sweet and timid woman who is attracted to cruel men. She had a one-night stand with Frank Reynolds 30 years ago. She later reconnects with Frank, enjoying his harsh treatment becoming his "bang maid," but she quickly transfers her affections to Mac's intimidating father Luther after meeting him at a dinner party thrown by Mac and Charlie. Quite neurotic and emotional (possibly suffering from obsessive compulsive disorder), she is prone to dramatic episodes. There is evidence that Bonnie may have once been a prostitute, which is later revealed to be true, a fact which greatly upsets Charlie. In "Mac's Mom Burns Her House Down", Mac's mother accidentally burns her house down and moves in with Bonnie. At first they do not get along, but they eventually bond over their mutual racism and xenophobia.

Lynne Marie Stewart died in February 2025. Her final appearance in the Season 17 episode "The Golden Bachelor Live" was dedicated to her memory.

=== Shelley Kelly ===
Shelley Kelly (Colm Meaney) is Charlie's biological father. He was pen-pals with Charlie since he was a child. Charlie assumed he was just a friend, while the gang does not believe he existed, as they would converse in a made-up language. However, it is revealed in "The Gang's Still in Ireland" that Shelley was actually his father and that they were conversing in Gaelic. Charlie agrees to follow his father's footsteps, willing to become a cheese monger and to live in Ireland. However, Shelley dies of COVID-19 after it is revealed that Frank is not vaccinated. The gang throws him off a cliff, a Kelly family tradition.

=== Luther Mac ===
Luther McDonald (also referred to as Luther Mac) (Gregory Scott Cummins) is Mac's father and a convicted felon. He is tall, has numerous tattoos, and never blinks resulting in a very intimidating appearance. Out of fear, he is one of the few people the gang does not immediately try to manipulate or exploit. Bonnie Kelly is attracted to Luther's aloof behavior and criminal past. In his first appearance in Season 2 ("Dennis and Dee Get a New Dad"), he attempts to get Mac and Charlie to smuggle heroin into the prison in their rectums.

In the Season 3 episode "Dennis Looks Like a Registered Sex Offender", he is out on parole and convinces Mac to help him "take care of some people" he has listed, including former witnesses in his trial and the judge who sentenced him. Charlie and Mac become convinced that he is using them as drivers while making the rounds to murder the people on his list and try to get Luther sent back to prison. Mac is horrified to learn that Luther was apologizing to the people on his list rather than harming any of them, and he violated parole when he made proscribed plane reservations to leave the state and take Mac and Charlie to the Baseball Hall of Fame. Luther tells Mac he had no plans to hurt him, but once he gets out of prison again, he is going to murder him and Charlie.

In Season 4 when Luther is paroled anew, Mac and Charlie fake their deaths to escape what they believe is his unstoppable wrath. Luther forgives Mac for this in a note where he tells his son that he loves him and always had and to stay away from him for the rest of their lives.

In the Season 10 episode "Mac Kills His Dad", Luther is the suspect in the beheading of a state official. Mac learns that the murder was committed by Luther's lover Eduardo Sanchez and reveals this to Bill Ponderosa, who goes to the police intending to confess the crime himself but decides at the last minute to rat on Eduardo. This leads to the other inmates in the jail to think Luther is the rat and it is implied that Luther is attacked by the other inmates as a result. When Mac comes out to Luther in the Season 13 finale when Mac does an elaborate ballet performance for the jail inmates, Luther is visibly angry and walks out of the room without any words.

In the Season 18 episode "Dennis and Dee Don't Get Rich", Luther is given 24 hours of supervised compassion leave in order to attend Bonnie's funeral and be in the Mummers parade tribute to her. At the funeral, Luther states to Mac his intentions to swap places with his brother Donald in the ceremony in his plan to escape from prison. As the police prepare to take away what they think is Donald, Mac confesses Luther's escape plans to them and that Luther is currently disguised as Donald. After the police leave, Luther reveals he never swapped places with Donald, as he always knew Mac would "rat" on him, and walks away finally free.

=== Mrs. Mac ===
Mrs. McDonald (also referred to as Mrs. Mac) (Sandy Martin) is Mac's mom. She is always portrayed smoking and usually watching television, completely apathetic to whatever takes place around her, and openly states that she hates both Mac and Luther, and the entire human race in general. When Mac and Charlie fake their deaths, she falls asleep at her son's "funeral" with a portable TV on her lap. Due to her damaged vocal cords as a result of her chain smoking, she often communicates through unenthused grunts which Mac translates. In Season 6, she accidentally burns her house down and moves in with Bonnie Kelly, the two bonding over their mutual racism. Mac claims that she is a skilled mechanic, having worked all the way up to the position of manager at a Jiffy Lube, which, despite Charlie's skepticism, she demonstrates by repairing Bonnie's ceiling fan. She rarely speaks, but often makes comments that are racist and xenophobic when she does.

=== Heinrich "Pop Pop" Landgraf ===
Heinrich "Pop Pop" Landgraf (Tom Bower) is Dennis and Dee's anti-Semitic maternal grandfather (and presumably their cousin Gail's) who is languishing in a nursing home and is rarely visited by relatives. A former SS officer who escaped punishment for his crimes, Pop Pop remains an unrepentant Nazi. In his youth, he was the spitting image of Dennis, much to the disturbance of Mac and Charlie. Charlie accidentally leads him to believe he is Dennis when he and Dee visited him in "The Gang Finds a Dead Guy". Charlie finds a box with Pop Pop's old Nazi uniform and a painting by Hitler. In season eight, a home video from the early 1980s shows that as children, Dennis and Dee were forced to attend a neo-Nazi Hitler Youth camp coordinated by their grandfather. In "Pop–Pop: The Final Solution", The Lawyer informs Dennis and Dee that they are the next of kin and must decide whether they want to pull the plug on Pop Pop. After the two of them could not come to a decision they turn power of attorney to The Lawyer. He tells the doctor to pull the plug, but Pop Pop begins to breathe on his own. Bower died in 2024.
