= Glenn Howerton =

American actor, comedian and producer (born 1976)

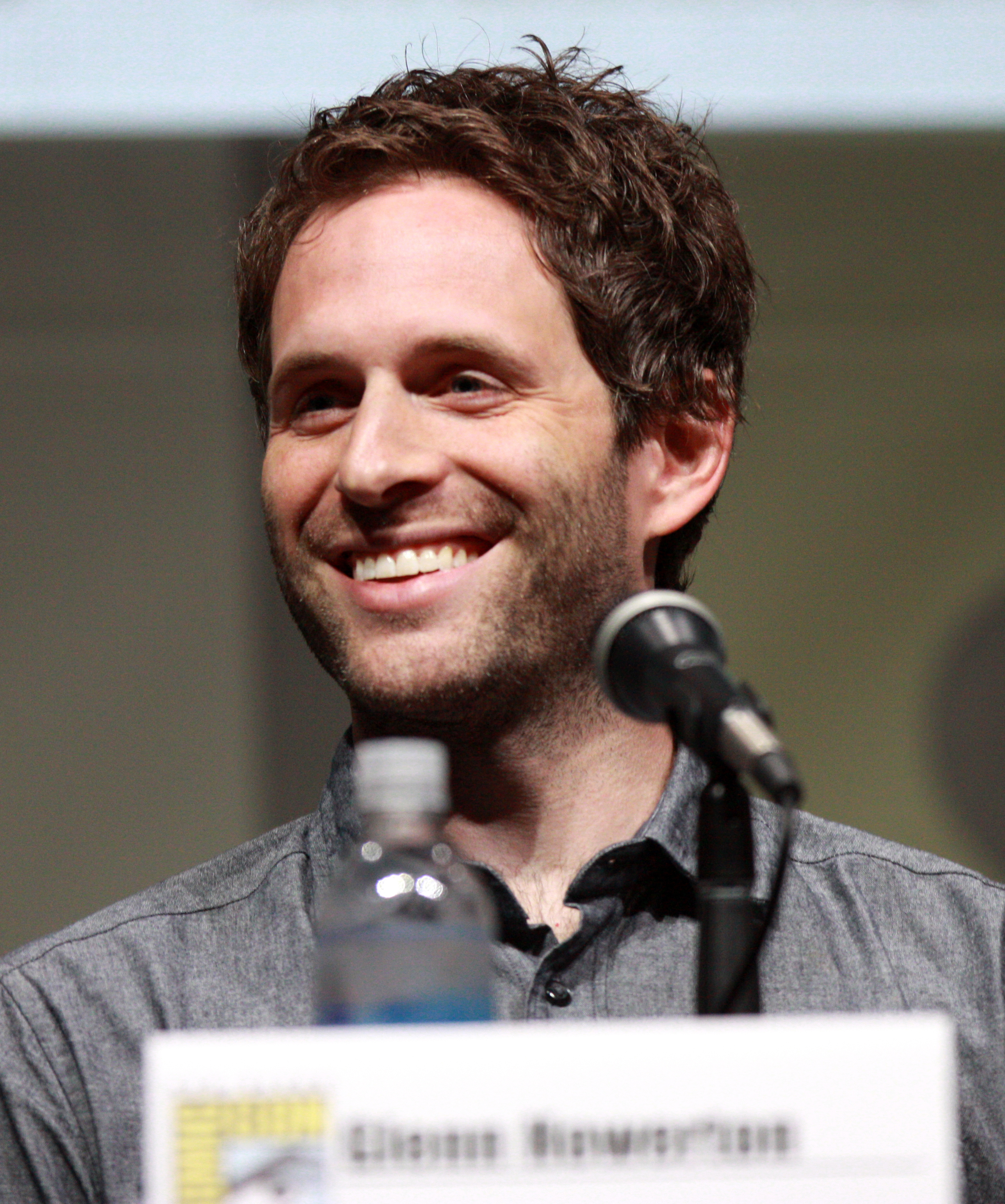
- Howerton in 2013
- Born: Glenn Franklin Howerton III; April 13, 1976 (age 50); Okinawa Prefecture, Japan
- Citizenship: United States
- Education: Juilliard School (BFA)
- Occupations: Actor; comedian; writer; producer
- Years active: 1996–present
- Spouse: Jill Latiano (m. 2009)
- Children: 2

Glenn Franklin Howerton III (/haʊərtən/; born April 13, 1976) is an American actor, comedian, writer, and producer. He is best known for playing Dennis Reynolds on the FX/FXX sitcom It's Always Sunny in Philadelphia (2005–present), which he co-developed and serves as an executive producer and writer alongside the other main cast members.

Howerton's other notable performances include Cliff Gilbert on The Mindy Project (2012–2017), Don Chumph on the first season of Fargo (2014), Jack Griffin on A.P. Bio (2018–2021), and Jim Balsillie in the film BlackBerry (2023). He also co-hosted The Always Sunny Podcast (2021–2023) with his fellow It's Always Sunny co-stars and co-creators Rob McElhenney and Charlie Day.

== Early life ==
Howerton was born in Okinawa Prefecture, Japan on April 13, 1976, the son of American parents Janice and Glenn Franklin Howerton Jr. He has an older sister named Courtney. His father was a fighter pilot in the United States Armed Forces, and the family frequently moved due to his military career. After Howerton's birth, his family returned to the U.S. to live in Arizona and then New Mexico. When he was three years old, they relocated to United Kingdom, where they lived in Felixstowe. Four years later, they again returned to the U.S. to live in Virginia. They then had a stint in South Korea, where they were based in Seoul. When he was 10 years old, they returned to the U.S. for a third time and settled in Montgomery, Alabama.

After graduating from Jefferson Davis High School in Montgomery, Howerton moved to Miami, where he spent two years at the New World School of the Arts of Miami Dade College. In 1996, he entered Juilliard School's Drama Division in New York City, where he graduated with a BFA as part of Group 29 (1996–2000).

== Career ==
In 2002, Howerton starred as Corey Howard in That '80s Show. He went on to guest star on ER as Dr. Nick Cooper in 2003. He had small roles in the films Must Love Dogs (2005), Serenity (2005), Two Weeks (2006), and The Strangers (2008). He also appeared as a doctor in Crank (2006), and reprised the role in its 2009 sequel, Crank: High Voltage.

Howerton is best known for playing the narcissistic and sociopathic Dennis Reynolds on the FX sitcom It's Always Sunny in Philadelphia (2005–present). The series was co-created by Howerton alongside Rob McElhenney and Charlie Day, who all serve as producers, writers, and main cast members alongside Kaitlin Olson and Danny DeVito. As of season 14, he has also directed two episodes. In December 2021, It's Always Sunny became the longest-running live-action American comedy of all time with the release of its 15th season. The series is still ongoing as of October 2026, with its 18th season concluding October 12, 2026.

In 2008, Howerton co-created sci-fi comedy Boldly Going Nowhere with Day, McElhenney, and writing assistant Adam Stein, but the pilot was permanently shelved. He has also had producing roles on various projects created by other It's Always Sunny colleagues, like David Hornsby, such as CBS sitcom How to Be a Gentleman, adult animated sitcom Unsupervised, and Fox sitcomThe Cool Kids. Howerton also did several voice roles, including a recurring part on The Cleveland Show as Ernie Krinklesac.

In 2013, he played the lead role in a film for the first time, landing the character of Will in the CollegeHumor comedy film Coffee Town with co-stars Steve Little and Ben Schwartz. Soon after, he landed recurring roles on the Fox comedy series The Mindy Project (2012–2017) as Cliff Gilbert, the divorce lawyer introduced in season two as one of Mindy's love interests, on the critically acclaimed first season of the FX dark comedy series Fargo (2014–present) as Don Chumph, and on the Showtime comedy-drama series House of Lies (2012–2016) starring Don Cheadle in its final season as the young mayoral candidate Seth Buckley. Howerton also played a small part as the gun-running Dominic in the Netflix Original film Officer Downe (2016) starring Kim Coates.

His next major television role came in 2018 on the NBC single-camera comedy created by Mike O'Brien, A.P. Bio (2018–2021), where he played Jack Griffin, an arrogant Harvard philosophy professor whose fall from grace forced him to get a job teaching biology to high school students in his hometown of Toledo, while plotting to exact revenge on his nemesis and restore his career. The show ran for two seasons on NBC before it was cancelled and then picked up by Peacock, NBC's streaming service, where it ran for another two seasons. In December 2021, it was cancelled for good.

In October 2022, it was announced that he would be voicing Fred Jones on the upcoming HBO Max animated series Velma.

Starting in November 2021, Day, McElhenney, and Howerton launched The Always Sunny Podcast, a weekly show loosely based on the rewatch format of podcasting, which had grown in popularity in recent years, to coincide with the release of the record-breaking 15th season of It's Always Sunny.

In June 2022, they released Four Walls Whiskey, with all proceeds from the 15-year single-malt Irish whiskey going toward supporting the Pennsylvania hospitality industry, which was badly hit by the pandemic.

In August 2022, it was announced that Howerton would be co-starring with Jay Baruchel in a Canadian biopic directed by Matt Johnson on the rise and fall of BlackBerry, portraying one of its co-founders. The film BlackBerry (2023) premiered in competition at Berlinale 2023 on February 17 to positive reviews from critics, with Howerton's performance as Jim Balsillie being especially well received.

In 2025, he played Ethan Corbin III on the Netflix dark comedy limited series Sirens. That same year, he also guest starred as his It's Always Sunny character, Dennis Reynolds, in the ABC sitcom Abbott Elementary during a cross-over event.

== Personal life ==
Howerton dated actress Morena Baccarin while they were both attending Juilliard.

He married actress Jill Latiano on September 5, 2009, following an engagement that lasted for over a year. They have two sons together, the first born in 2011 and the second born in 2014.

Howerton was diagnosed with ADHD in 2023.

== Filmography ==
Key
†	Denotes works that have not yet been released

=== Film ===
Year	Title	Role	Notes
2005	Must Love Dogs	Michael	
2005	Serenity	Lilac Young Tough	
2006	Crank	Doctor	
2006	Two Weeks	Matthew Bergman	
2008	The Strangers	Mike	
2008	Happy Wednesday	Spencer Scott	Short film
2009	Crank: High Voltage	Doctor	Uncredited
2010	Everything Must Go	Gary	
2013	Coffee Town	Will	
2014	All the Wilderness	—N/a	Executive producer
2016	Officer Downe	Dominic	
2020	The Hunt	Richard	
2020	Archenemy	The Manager	
2021	How It Ends	John	
2022	The Send-Off	—N/a	Producer
2022	The Thief Collector	Jerry	
2023	BlackBerry	Jim Balsillie	
2023	Fool's Paradise	Business Manager	
2027	The Girlfriend	Elliot	Also screenwriter

=== Television ===
Year	Title	Role	Notes
2002	Monday Night Mayhem	Dick Ebersol	Television film
2002	The Job	Young Guy	Episode: "Gay"
2002	That '80s Show	Corey Howard	Main role (13 episodes)
2003	ER	Dr. Nick Cooper	Six episodes
2005–present	It's Always Sunny in Philadelphia	Dennis Reynolds Wendell Albright	Main role Also co-creator (uncredited), developer, executive producer, writer, and director
2008	Boldly Going Nowhere	Lt. Zander Centauri	Guest role (unaired pilot); Also co-creator, executive producer, and writer
2009	American Dad!	Animal Control Guy #1	Voice; episode: "Weiner of Our Discontent"
2009–2010	Glenn Martin, DDS	Various voices	Three episodes
2009–2013	The Cleveland Show	Ernie Krinklesac, various roles	Voice; 30 episodes
2011	Vietnam in HD	Donald DeVore	Miniseries (five episodes)
2011	How to be a Gentleman	—N/a	Consulting producer (eight episodes)
2012	Unsupervised	Clint / Dirt	Voice; four episodes Also executive producer and writer (13 episodes)
2013–2017	The Mindy Project	Cliff Gilbert	Recurring role in seasons two, three, and six (13 episodes)
2014–2015	Family Guy	Various roles	Voice; four episodes (uncredited in season 12, credited in season 13)
2014	Fargo	Don Chumph	Five episodes
2015	On the Record with Mick Rock	—N/a	Executive producer
2015	TripTank	Congressman Rothbard; Congressman Hume; Congressman Adorno	Episode: "Mr. Winchester Goes to Washington"
2016	House of Lies	Seth Buckley	Four episodes
2018	The Cool Kids	—N/a	Executive producer
2018–2021	A.P. Bio	Jack Griffin	Main role (42 episodes); Also co-executive producer, producer (season one) and director
2020	The Fugitive	Jerry	Main role (14 episodes)
2023–2024	Velma	Fred Jones	Voice; main role
2025	Abbott Elementary	Dennis Reynolds	Episode: "Volunteers"; Crossover with It's Always Sunny in Philadelphia
2025	Sirens	Ethan Corbin III	Netflix limited series
2025	The Simpsons	Peter Linz	Voice; episode: "Bart 'N' Frink"

=== Web ===
Year	Title	Role	Notes
2021–2023	The Always Sunny Podcast	Himself/host	68 episodes

=== Music videos ===
Year	Title	Artist	Notes
2017	"Rich Friends"	Portugal. The Man	

== Theatre ==
Year	Title	Role	Notes
2000	Compleat Female Stage Beauty	Duke of Buckingham	
2001	The Credeaux Canvas	Jamie	
2015	The Comedy of Errors	Antipholus of Ephesus, Antipholus of Syracuse	

== Awards and nominations ==
Year	Award Ceremony	Category	Nominated work	Result	Ref.
2015	International Online Cinema Awards	Best Writing for a Comedy Series (shared with Charlie Day and Rob McElhenney)	It's Always Sunny in Philadelphia	Nominated	
2019	IGN Summer Movie Awards	Best TV Ensemble (shared with Charlie Day, Rob McElhenney, Kaitlin Olson, and Danny DeVito)	It's Always Sunny in Philadelphia	Nominated	
2023	Chicago Film Critics Association Awards	Best Supporting Actor	BlackBerry	Nominated	
2023	Gotham Awards	Outstanding Supporting Performance	BlackBerry	Nominated	
2023	Hollywood Film Critics Association Midseason Awards	Best Supporting Actor	BlackBerry	Won	
2023	Indiana Film Journalists Association	Best Lead Performance	BlackBerry	Nominated	
2023	Las Vegas Film Critics Society Awards	Best Supporting Actor	BlackBerry	Nominated	
2023	North Texas Film Critics Association	Best Supporting Actor	BlackBerry	Won (Note: Tied with Robert Downey Jr.)	
2023	Toronto Film Critics Association Awards	Outstanding Supporting Performance	BlackBerry	Runner-up (Note: 4th place)	
2023	Toronto Film Critics Association Awards	Outstanding Performance in a Canadian Film	BlackBerry	Won	
2023	UK Film Critics Association Awards	Supporting Actor of the Year	BlackBerry	Nominated	
2024	ASTRA Awards	Game Changer Award	BlackBerry	Won	
2024	ASTRA Awards	Best Supporting Actor	BlackBerry	Nominated	
2024	Canadian Screen Awards, CA	Performance in a Supporting Role, Comedy	BlackBerry	Nominated	
2024	Chicago Indie Critics Awards	Best Supporting Actor	BlackBerry	Nominated	
2024	Columbus Film Critics Association	Best Supporting Performance	BlackBerry	Nominated	
2024	DiscussingFilm Critic Awards	Best Supporting Actor	BlackBerry	Nominated	
2024	Georgia Film Critics Association	Best Supporting Actor	BlackBerry	Nominated	
2024	Independent Spirit Awards	Best Supporting Performance	BlackBerry	Nominated	
2024	Music City Film Critics' Association Awards	Best Supporting Actor	BlackBerry	Nominated	
2024	Online Film & Television Association	Best Breakthrough Performance: Male	BlackBerry	Nominated	
2024	Vancouver Film Critics Circle	Best Supporting Male Actor in a Canadian Film	BlackBerry	Won	
2024	Canadian Screen Awards	Best Supporting Performance in a Comedy Film	BlackBerry	Won	
