= The Gang Carries a Corpse Up a Mountain =

- It's Always Sunny in Philadelphia episode
- Episode no.: Season 15; Episode 8
- Directed by: Richie Keen
- Written by: Megan Ganz
- Cinematography by: John Tanzer
- Editing by: Josh Drisko
- Production code: XIP15008
- Original air date: December 22, 2021
- Running time: 22 minutes

Guest appearances
- Mary Elizabeth Ellis as Waitress

Episode chronology
← Previous "Dee Sinks in a Bog"	Next → "The Gang Inflates"
- It's Always Sunny in Philadelphia season 15

"The Gang Carries a Corpse Up a Mountain" is the eighth episode and season finale of the fifteenth season of the American sitcom television series It's Always Sunny in Philadelphia. It is the 162nd overall episode of the series and was written by executive producer Megan Ganz and directed by Richie Keen. It originally aired on FXX on December 22, 2021, airing back-to-back with the previous episode, "Dee Sinks in a Bog".

The series follows "The Gang", a group of five misfit friends: twins Dennis and Deandra "(Sweet) Dee" Reynolds, their friends Charlie Kelly and Ronald "Mac" McDonald, and Frank Reynolds, Dennis' and Dee's legal father. The Gang runs the fictional Paddy's Pub, an unsuccessful Irish bar in South Philadelphia. In the episode, Charlie's father has died and in order to honor the family tradition, Charlie asks for the Gang's help in carrying the corpse to the top of a mountain and then throw him to the sea. The episode concludes a story arc where the Gang goes to Ireland.

According to Nielsen Media Research, the episode was seen by an estimated 0.255 million household viewers and gained a 0.14 ratings share among adults aged 18–49. The episode received critical acclaim, with praise directed toward the performances and emotional tone, particularly the scene where Charlie confronts his father's corpse for not being there for him.

== Plot ==
Mac (Rob McElhenney), Dennis (Glenn Howerton), Dee (Kaitlin Olson) and Frank (Danny DeVito) meet for a day of hiking with Charlie (Charlie Day) and Shelley. However, Charlie reveals the purpose of the journey: Shelley has died and he wants to carry his corpse to the top of the mountain and then drop it in the sea as part of the family's tradition.

The Gang decides to help Charlie with his request. During the journey, Frank reveals that Dr O'Shaunessy showed up at the castle for his date with Dee, only for Dennis to pour hot oil on him. Dee's frustration prompts Charlie to reveal that her appearance killed his father, as a lot of his familiars died after witnessing a banshee so Dee storms off. Later, Dennis lets go for a moment in carrying the corpse and they realize he wasn't carrying the corpse, and was in fact hanging off it, as it somehow felt lighter after he let it go. They manage to get the corpse when it is near the top of the hill but Mac accidentally kicks it, causing the corpse to slide down all the way to the bottom of the hill.

During a talk, Charlie, Frank, and Dennis reveal that they paid Mac's mom to say he was Dutch (Note: As depicted in "The Gang Goes to Ireland".) because they expected him to annoy them during the journey. The lie, coupled with the guys mocking his tattoos, cause Mac to furiously leave the group. After traveling more, Charlie reveals that his father died after finding fluid in his lungs when he took him to the hospital after Dee scared him, making them realize that Shelley died from COVID-19. As it is revealed that Dennis and Frank are both unvaccinated, they conclude that they passed it on to Shelley, resulting in his death. Dennis decides to leave too and Charlie makes amends with Frank. However, when he drinks from Frank's canteen, he actually drinks urine and he decides to leave Frank and go to the top all by himself.

Dee, Mac, Dennis, and Frank meet at a pub where they complain about Ireland by speaking very loudly. The Waitress (Mary Elizabeth Ellis), still affected by the bog, is revealed to be there too and chastises them for speaking too loudly. They defend their volume, with Frank affirming that as Americans, they stand behind each other for anything. Meanwhile, Charlie is struggling to carry the corpse just as it starts to rain. He gives up and breaks down in tears, lamenting how his father was absent in his life and chastising him. Just then, the Gang arrives in an F-150 Raptor pick-up. They help him throw the corpse from the top of the hill, although the corpse hits the rocks instead of the sea, with Mac noting that kids will eventually find the body, like in the movie Stand by Me. Instead of feeling bad, Charlie calls Shelley a "deadbeat," and the Gang leaves for America.

== Production ==
=== Development ===
In November 2021, it was reported that the eighth and final episode of the fifteenth season would be titled "The Gang Carries a Corpse Up a Mountain", and was to be directed by Richie Keen and written by executive producer Megan Ganz. This was Keen's 13th directing credit, and Ganz's 6th writing credit.

=== Filming ===
In August and September 2021, images circulated where the cast teased that they were filming in Ireland. In November 2021, it was confirmed that the series would have episodes set in Ireland. However, due to COVID-19 restrictions in the country, the series used Bodega Bay, California as a stand-in for Ireland.

== Reception ==
=== Viewers ===
In its original American broadcast, "The Gang Carries a Corpse Up a Mountain" was seen by an estimated 0.255 million household viewers and gained a 0.14 ratings share among adults aged 18–49, according to Nielsen Media Research. This means that 0.14 percent of all households with televisions watched the episode. This was a 13% decrease in viewership from the previous episode, which was watched by 0.293 million viewers with a 0.17 in the 18-49 demographics. It was also a 8% increase over the previous season finale, which was watched by 0.236 million viewers with a 0.14 in the demo.

=== Critical reviews ===
"The Gang Carries a Corpse Up a Mountain" received very positive reviews from critics. Dennis Perkins of The A.V. Club gave the episode a "B" grade and wrote, "A lot's been made about It's Always Sunny's unprecedented longevity, and how, despite the occasional misstep, its astoundingly consistent quality. As time's gone on, the extreme difficulty built into Sunny's singularly dark and bitter formula has only made that consistency more impressive. Especially as the creators naturally seek to flesh out their characters without unbalancing Sunny's world through encroaching growth or sentimentality. Dennis' departure, Mac's dance — they were so affecting because of how perilously close the show came to tipping over into unrecoverable humanity."

Ben Travers of IndieWire wrote, "If '2020: A Year In Review' is satire that cites its sources, then 'The Gang Carries a Corpse Up a Mountain' sounds like the opposite. It's a situational comedy where the situation is spelled out in the title, and the jokes stem from established character dynamics or good old-fashioned slapstick. But it's also savvy, targeted satire."
