= It's Always Sunny in Philadelphia season 15 =

2021 season of American television series

It's Always Sunny in Philadelphia
- Season 15
- Promotional poster
- Starring: Charlie Day; Glenn Howerton; Rob McElhenney; Kaitlin Olson; Danny DeVito
- No. of episodes: 8

Release
- Original network: FXX
- Original release: December 1 – December 22, 2021

Season chronology
- ← Previous; Season 14 Next → Season 16

The fifteenth season of the American television sitcom series It's Always Sunny in Philadelphia premiered on FXX on December 1 and concluded on December 22, 2021. This season had next day availability on FX on Hulu and FXNOW. The season consists of eight episodes and makes the series the longest-running live-action scripted comedy series in American television history, surpassing The Adventures of Ozzie and Harriet.

== Cast ==
=== Main cast ===
- Charlie Day as Charlie Kelly
- Glenn Howerton as Dennis Reynolds
- Rob McElhenney as Ronald "Mac" McDonald
- Kaitlin Olson as Deandra "Dee" Reynolds
- Danny DeVito as Frank Reynolds

=== Special guest cast ===
- Colm Meaney as Shelley Kelly

=== Recurring cast ===
- Mary Elizabeth Ellis as The Waitress

=== Guest stars ===
- Brian Huskey as Gary
- Artemis Pebdani as Artemis
- Marcuis W. Harris as Pepper Jack
- Geoffrey Owens as "Don Cheadle"
- Jack Plotnick as Michael Goldmate
- Iman Karram as Kiki
- Michael Mealor as Tony
- Sandy Martin as Mrs. Mac
- Mark Prendergast as Gus

== Production ==
The series was renewed for a fifteenth season in May 2020, making it the longest-running live-action comedy series in American television history, replacing The Adventures of Ozzie and Harriet, which ran for 14 seasons between 1952 and 1966. On April 9, 2020, Rob McElhenney announced that writing had begun for season 15. Filming for the season began in May 2021 and wrapped that October. Despite teases that the Ireland arc was shot in Dublin, Ireland, in August and September 2021, the final four episodes of the season were instead shot at Bodega Bay, California due to COVID-19 restrictions in Ireland.

The season is the first not to be distributed by 20th Television and instead is distributed by Disney-ABC Domestic Television due to the Disney-FOX merger in December 2017.

== Episodes ==
No. overall	No. in season	Title	Directed by	Written by	Original release date	Prod. code	US viewers (millions)
155	1	"2020: A Year in Review"	Todd Biermann	Rob McElhenney & Charlie Day & Glenn Howerton	December 1, 2021	XIP15001	0.285
The Gang looks back on 2020 to justify their numerous PPP loans. In doing so, it is revealed that they contributed to the chaos of the past political year way more than anyone could have imagined.
156	2	"The Gang Makes Lethal Weapon 7"	Pete Chatmon	Keyonna Taylor & Katie McElhenney	December 1, 2021	XIP15002	0.237
Upon discovering that their self-made Lethal Weapon sequels have been pulled from the local library, the Gang decides to address their political incorrectness by making another film -- Lethal Weapon 7.
157	3	"The Gang Buys a Roller Rink"	Richie Keen	Rob Rosell & David Hornsby	December 8, 2021	XIP15003	0.318
When their favourite roller rink is being closed down, the Gang flashbacks to 1998 when Mac, Dennis and Charlie tried to buy the rink but instead end up buying Paddy's.
158	4	"The Gang Replaces Dee with a Monkey"	Todd Biermann	Glenn Howerton & Nina Pedrad	December 8, 2021	XIP15004	0.235
When the Gang suspects Dee is menopausal, they scramble to find a new employee for Paddy’s Pub. Meanwhile, Dee decides to put her acting career on hold in order to mentor young actors.
159	5	"The Gang Goes to Ireland"	Megan Ganz	Rob McElhenney & Charlie Day & Glenn Howerton	December 15, 2021	XIP15005	0.285
The Gang’s in Dublin! Dennis longs for a charming, authentic European experience, but ends up helping Frank with some of his business’s 'dirty work.' Mac and Charlie learn about their Irish heritage.
160	6	"The Gang's Still in Ireland"	Megan Ganz	Rob McElhenney & Charlie Day & Glenn Howerton	December 15, 2021	XIP15006	0.232
Dennis and Dee explore their new accommodations in the countryside; Frank accompanies Charlie to find the truth about Charlie’s Irish childhood pen pal; Mac has an identity crisis and decides to join the seminary.
161	7	"Dee Sinks in a Bog"	Pete Chatmon	David Hornsby & Rob Rosell	December 22, 2021	XIP15007	0.293
Guided by a young priest, Mac spends a day at the seminary to truly understand what it takes to become a priest. Dennis and Frank plan an elaborate trap at the castle to humiliate Charlie’s pen pal. Dee prepares for a date with an Irish doctor.
162	8	"The Gang Carries a Corpse Up a Mountain"	Richie Keen	Megan Ganz	December 22, 2021	XIP15008	0.255
The Gang attempts to ascend a mountain in order for Charlie to fulfill an old and mysterious Irish burial tradition. But one by one, the Gang backs out until Charlie is left to honor the dead body alone.

== Reception ==
=== Critical response ===
On Rotten Tomatoes, the season has an approval rating of 100% with an average score of 9 out of 10 based on 7 reviews, the highest rating since season 11.

=== Ratings ===
Viewership and ratings per episode of It's Always Sunny in Philadelphia season 15
No.	Title	Air date	Rating (18–49)	Viewers (millions)	DVR (18–49)	DVR viewers (millions)	Total (18–49)	Total viewers (millions)
1	"2020: A Year In Review"	December 1, 2021	0.14	0.285	0.14	0.292	0.28	0.577
2	"The Gang Makes Lethal Weapon 7"	December 1, 2021	0.11	0.237	0.14	0.278	0.25	0.515
3	"The Gang Buys a Roller Rink"	December 8, 2021	0.18	0.318	—N/a	—N/a	—N/a	—N/a
4	"The Gang Replaces Dee With a Monkey"	December 8, 2021	0.14	0.235	—N/a	—N/a	—N/a	—N/a
5	"The Gang Goes to Ireland"	December 15, 2021	0.13	0.285	—N/a	—N/a	—N/a	—N/a
6	"The Gang's Still in Ireland"	December 15, 2021	0.12	0.232	—N/a	—N/a	—N/a	—N/a
7	"Dee Sinks in a Bog"	December 22, 2021	0.17	0.293	—N/a	—N/a	—N/a	—N/a
8	"The Gang Carries a Corpse Up a Mountain"	December 22, 2021	0.14	0.255	—N/a	—N/a	—N/a	—N/a
