= The Gang's Still in Ireland =

- It's Always Sunny in Philadelphia episode
- Episode no.: Season 15; Episode 6
- Directed by: Megan Ganz
- Written by: Rob McElhenney; Charlie Day; Glenn Howerton
- Cinematography by: John Tanzer
- Editing by: Scott Draper
- Production code: XIP15006
- Original air date: December 15, 2021
- Running time: 22 minutes

Guest appearances
- Colm Meaney as Shelley Kelly (special guest star); Mark Prendergast as Gus

Episode chronology
← Previous "The Gang Goes to Ireland"	Next → "Dee Sinks in a Bog"
- It's Always Sunny in Philadelphia season 15

"The Gang's Still in Ireland" is the sixth episode of the fifteenth season of the American sitcom television series It's Always Sunny in Philadelphia. It is the 160th overall episode of the series and was written by main cast members Rob McElhenney, Charlie Day, and Glenn Howerton and directed by executive producer Megan Ganz. It originally aired on FXX on December 15, 2021, airing back-to-back with the previous episode, "The Gang Goes to Ireland".

The series follows "The Gang", a group of five misfit friends: twins Dennis and Deandra "(Sweet) Dee" Reynolds, their friends Charlie Kelly and Ronald "Mac" McDonald, and Frank Reynolds, Dennis' and Dee's legal father. The Gang runs the fictional Paddy's Pub, an unsuccessful Irish bar in South Philadelphia. In the episode, Frank and Charlie visit Shelley Kelly, Charlie's pen pal and possible relative. Meanwhile, Dee and Dennis stay at a dilapidated castle where the influence of the house and Dennis' deteriorating health cause problems; while Mac decides to join a priesthood. The episode continues a story arc where the Gang goes to Ireland.

According to Nielsen Media Research, the episode was seen by an estimated 0.232 million household viewers and gained a 0.12 ratings share among adults aged 18–49. The episode received very positive reviews from critics, who praised the performances (particularly Colm Meaney's guest appearance), wholesome elements and surprisingly emotive tone.

== Plot ==
Dee (Kaitlin Olson) wakes up in an Irish pub named "Patty's Pub" with the Gang, realizing that she will be late for her role. She then goes outside and is angry to find that she is in the Irish countryside.

Charlie (Charlie Day) wants to find out more about Shelley Kelly, discovering that he is the town's "Cheesemonger". He and Frank (Danny DeVito) visit Shelley (Colm Meaney), who is much older than Charlie imagined and shares many of his traits. Shelley recognizes Charlie as his pen pal, and states he is not his brother, he is actually his father. It's revealed that Charlie's illiteracy was in part due to writing letters in Irish to his father.

Dee and Dennis (Glenn Howerton) visit an estate agency in order to find a castle. Dennis's constant coughing prevents him from dealing with the realtor and Dee is the one who talks. When they arrive at the castle, they find it is in ruins and is a place where multiple atrocities were recently committed. Dee is horrified, but Dennis is happy with the property. That night, Dee hears Dennis talking to "the castle" and is then attacked by Dennis with an axe. Meanwhile, Mac (Rob McElhenney) decides to join the priesthood as he is still questioning his true identity. He attempts to avoid the handsome priests as he feels this will distract him.

Charlie, Frank and Shelley go to a pub to celebrate their discovery, where some of the bar's male patrons state they also "loved" Charlie's mother. They stay at Shelley's house, where he offers a bedroom for Charlie and a cot for Frank. Frank's shock humor does not seem to cause amusement to Charlie anymore, who goes in to the bedroom. The episode ends with a dejected Frank sitting alone on the cot.

== Production ==
=== Development ===
In November 2021, it was reported that the sixth episode of the fifteenth season would be titled "The Gang's Still in Ireland", and was to be directed by executive producer Megan Ganz and written by main cast members Rob McElhenney, Charlie Day and Glenn Howerton. This was Ganz's 2nd directing credit, McElhenney's 57th writing credit, Day's 63rd writing credit, and Howerton's 45th writing credit.

=== Casting ===
In November 2021, the trailer for the season revealed that Colm Meaney would guest star on the series as part of the series' episodes taking place in Ireland.

=== Filming ===
In August and September 2021, images circulated where the cast teased that they were filming in Ireland. In November 2021, it was confirmed that the series would have episodes set in Ireland. However, due to COVID-19 restrictions in the country, the series used Bodega Bay, California as a stand-in for Ireland.

== Reception ==
=== Viewers ===
In its original American broadcast, "The Gang's Still in Ireland" was seen by an estimated 0.232 million household viewers and gained a 0.12 ratings share among adults aged 18–49, according to Nielsen Media Research. This means that 0.12 percent of all households with televisions watched the episode. This was a 19% decrease in viewership from the previous episode, which was watched by 0.285 million viewers with a 0.13 in the 18-49 demographics.

=== Critical reviews ===
"The Gang's Still in Ireland" received very positive reviews from critics. Dennis Perkins of The A.V. Club gave the episode a "B+" grade and wrote, "Taking the Gang out of Philly has been done before, of course, but this episodes-long Irish interlude is a big swing in a season that's emerged with uncharacteristic wobbliness out of the Season 15 gate. But while an eventful overseas jaunt might smack of the late-run desperation of 80s sitcoms like The Facts Of Life or Family Ties, where creators try to brush off the gathering moss by plunging their aging characters into some disposable, colorful comic intrigue, this two-parter hits the ground in deliriously confident stride."

Ross Bonaime of Collider wrote, "The trip to Ireland has both Charlie and Mac coming to grips with where they come from. It's astounding that after all this time, It's Always Sunny in Philadelphia can still expand this world, evolve these characters, and find new facets of these dynamics that we never even knew we wanted." Liz Shannon Miller of Consequence wrote, "Much of the latter part of the season ends up taking place in Ireland, for which the production did travel to the Emerald Isles for some location shooting. To explain what leads the gang there would take a very long time and wouldn't be nearly as amusing as watching it yourself, but the extended international trip features a fantastic guest star in Colm Meaney, some truly beautiful Irish vistas, and a lot of Gaelic jokes." Brian Tallerico of RogerEbert.com wrote, "The season really gets going when a series of events sends the gang to Ireland for the first time as multiple episodes unfold across the Atlantic Ocean."
