= Dee Sinks in a Bog =

- It's Always Sunny in Philadelphia episode
- Episode no.: Season 15; Episode 7
- Directed by: Pete Chatmon
- Written by: David Hornsby; Rob Rosell
- Cinematography by: John Tanzer
- Editing by: Scott Draper
- Production code: XIP15007
- Original air date: December 22, 2021
- Running time: 22 minutes

Guest appearances
- Colm Meaney as Shelley Kelly (special guest star); Mary Elizabeth Ellis as Waitress; Mark Prendergast as Gus

Episode chronology
← Previous "The Gang's Still in Ireland"	Next → "The Gang Carries a Corpse Up a Mountain"
- It's Always Sunny in Philadelphia season 15

"Dee Sinks in a Bog" is the seventh and penultimate episode of the fifteenth season of the American sitcom television series It's Always Sunny in Philadelphia. It is the 161st overall episode of the series and was written by executive producers David Hornsby and Rob Rosell and directed by Pete Chatmon. It originally aired on FXX on December 22, 2021, airing back-to-back with the follow-up episode, "The Gang Carries a Corpse Up a Mountain".

The series follows "The Gang", a group of five misfit friends: twins Dennis and Deandra "(Sweet) Dee" Reynolds, their friends Charlie Kelly and Ronald "Mac" McDonald, and Frank Reynolds, Dennis' and Dee's legal father. The Gang runs the fictional Paddy's Pub, an unsuccessful Irish bar in South Philadelphia. In the episode, Dee sets a date with an Irish doctor but gets stuck in a bog, which could derail her plans. Meanwhile, Mac joins a seminary although he is disturbed by some of the intentions and Frank tries to drive apart Charlie and Shelley. The episode continues a story arc where the Gang goes to Ireland.

According to Nielsen Media Research, the episode was seen by an estimated 0.293 million household viewers and gained a 0.17 ratings share among adults aged 18–49. The episode received positive reviews from critics, who praised the performances, dark humor and the scenes between Charlie and Shelley.

== Plot ==
Dennis (Glenn Howerton) wakes up in a hospital after Dee (Kaitlin Olson) throws a stew at his face. Dee states that he had a high fever, started hallucinating, and then collapsed after defecating. His doctor, O'Shaunessy (Tom Archdeacon), checks on him and Dee starts flirting with him which results in them deciding to go on a date that night.

Dee and Dennis return to the castle, where they find Frank (Danny DeVito) waiting for them. He tries to reconnect with Dennis but Dennis is not interested, prompting him to reveal that Charlie (Charlie Day) is spending more time with his father Shelley (Colm Meaney) and he wants to stop that. Dennis agrees to help him if it involves the castle but Dee tells them to leave the castle to not ruin her date and she leaves to find peat moss on a bog to clean the smell of the house.

Under the guide of Father Gus (Mark Prendergast), Mac (Rob McElhenney) spends time at the seminary. He questions God's role in many calamities (even confusing the bible with the plot of Raiders of the Lost Ark), but Gus affirms that the interpretation of God's plans changes throughout time. During a later conversation, Gus confesses that he has "an eye for the lads" but never acted on his urges. Charlie and Shelley visit a cemetery with the family's gravestones, although Shelley states that their bodies were never buried. Their bodies were thrown from a cliff into the sea, and Shelley wants to follow the tradition when he dies. They believed that the man's soul could thus be released and watch over them - the women, on the other hand, roam the land as "hags and banshees", and sighting one is to be warned of one's impeding death.

While searching for the peat moss, Dee poses for selfies when she finds herself stuck in the bog and is starting to sink. The Waitress (Mary Elizabeth Ellis) passes by the bog and Dee asks for help. The Waitress agrees to help her, but only if she can say her name, which Dee is not able to do. In the church, Mac decides to join the seminary but changes his mind when he learns what Gus really meant by saying he had "an eye for the lads". At the castle, Frank invites Charlie and Shelley for dinner; however, Charlie quickly deduces that Frank's "meatballs" are actually feces intended for Shelley and forces Frank to eat one to prove they are not feces. Frank expresses his frustration but Charlie states that he won't return to Philadelphia and wants to work with his father in his shop.

Back at the bog at night, Dee has nearly sunk in the bog (even though the Waitress claims she guessed her name a while back) and the Waitress decides to finally save her. However, Dee pulls her in the bog and releases herself, leaving the Waitress stuck in the bog while she hurries for her date. Charlie and Shelley pass by Dee begging for help, but Shelley thinks she is a banshee.

== Production ==
=== Development ===
In November 2021, it was reported that the seventh episode of the fifteenth season would be titled "Dee Gets Stuck in a Bog", and was to be directed by Pete Chatmon and written by executive producers David Hornsby and Rob Rosell. This was Chatmon's 6th directing credit, Hornsby's 32nd writing credit, and Rosell's 25th writing credit. However, on the day of the episode's airing, it was reported that the title was changed to "Dee Sinks in a Bog".

=== Filming ===
In August and September 2021, images circulated where the cast teased that they were filming in Ireland. In November 2021, it was confirmed that the series would have episodes set in Ireland. However, due to COVID-19 restrictions in the country, the series used Bodega Bay, California as a stand-in for Ireland.

The bog scenes were filmed at Golden Oak Ranch, requiring the crew to build the bog in a swamp area. According to Olson, "whatever got in every single orifice of my body was organic." Filming the scene was difficult for Olson, as she couldn't properly see or walk, although she managed to film the scene in a single take.

== Reception ==
=== Viewers ===
In its original American broadcast, "Dee Sinks in a Bog" was seen by an estimated 0.293 million household viewers and gained a 0.17 ratings share among adults aged 18–49, according to Nielsen Media Research. This means that 0.17 percent of all households with televisions watched the episode. This was a 26% increase in viewership from the previous episode, which was watched by 0.232 million viewers with a 0.12 in the 18-49 demographics.

=== Critical reviews ===
"Dee Sinks in a Bog" received positive reviews from critics. Dennis Perkins of The A.V. Club gave the episode a "B" grade and wrote, "The Gang will never end. It's Always Sunny In Philadelphia has to, some day, I suppose. But The Gang, for all the narrative feints and come-to-naught hints about 'things never being the same again,' will never disband, not really."
