= The Gang Inflates =

- It's Always Sunny in Philadelphia episode
- Episode no.: Season 16; Episode 1
- Directed by: Heath Cullens
- Written by: Nina Pedrad
- Cinematography by: John Tanzer
- Editing by: Josh Drisko
- Production code: XIP16001
- Original air date: June 7, 2023
- Running time: 22 minutes

Episode chronology
← Previous "The Gang Carries a Corpse Up a Mountain"	Next → "Frank Shoots Every Member of the Gang"
- It's Always Sunny in Philadelphia season 16

"The Gang Inflates" is the first episode of the sixteenth season of the American sitcom television series It's Always Sunny in Philadelphia. It is the 163rd overall episode of the series and was written by co-executive producer Nina Pedrad and directed by co-executive producer Heath Cullens. It originally aired on FXX on June 7, 2023, airing back-to-back with the follow-up episode, "Frank Shoots Every Member of the Gang".

The series follows "The Gang", a group of five misfit friends: twins Dennis and Deandra "(Sweet) Dee" Reynolds, their friends Charlie Kelly and Ronald "Mac" McDonald, and Frank Reynolds, Dennis and Dee's legal father. The Gang runs the fictional Paddy's Pub, an unsuccessful Irish bar in South Philadelphia. In the episode, inflation starts affecting the Gang, forcing them to try to find new business strategies.

According to Nielsen Media Research, the episode was seen by an estimated 0.305 million household viewers and gained a 0.14 ratings share among adults aged 18–49. The episode received very positive reviews from critics, who praised the humor, absurdism, performances and the series' handling of inflation.

== Plot ==
Inflation starts affecting the Gang: Mac (Rob McElhenney) and Dennis (Glenn Howerton) had to rent their sofa for the past fifteen years, while Dee (Kaitlin Olson) is getting evicted from her apartment. Frank (Danny DeVito) explains inflation, and how they need to spend less on their expenses.

As Frank tries to find solutions for their expenses, he is shocked to discover that Charlie (Charlie Day) never told him there was a bathroom in their apartment. This prompts him to open their other door, discovering that there is a whole empty bedroom that Charlie never mentioned. Mac and Dennis arrive with inflatable couches, wanting to partner in a new business with the inflation, convincing Frank to loan them money in exchange for interest. Charlie is mad at Frank, as he chose to invest in Mac and Dennis over his cryptocurrency strategy, although Frank states he is planning to get paid as he does not believe Mac and Dennis will succeed. Frank later reveals to Dee that he is her landlord and he got her kicked out of her apartment for the inflation.

Annoyed by the noise and Dee's presence in his apartment, Charlie leaves for Mac and Dennis' apartment, where Mac has been suffering allergies from eating cheap nuts. Charlie informs them of Frank's predatory lending scheme, so Dennis decides to change their strategy to rent the inflatable couches. The business proves to be fruitless, so Charlie uses all their money to buy the discontinued Teenage Mutant Ninja Turtles Pie, angering Dennis. Frank tries to buy them from Charlie, but he refuses unless he returns everything to normal, including the loan, Dee's apartment and boarding up the new rooms in their apartment, which Frank reluctantly accepts. Mac's allergy worsens as he finishes the can of nuts, disgusting the Gang.

== Production ==
=== Development ===
In May 2023, it was reported that the first episode of the sixteenth season would be titled "The Gang Inflates", and was to be directed by co-executive producer Heath Cullens and written by co-executive producer Nina Pedrad. This was Cullens' eleventh directing credit, and Pedrad's second writing credit.

=== Filming ===
Filming for the episode and the season started in January 2023.

== Reception ==
=== Viewers ===
In its original American broadcast, "The Gang Inflates" was seen by an estimated 0.305 million household viewers and gained a 0.14 ratings share among adults aged 18–49, according to Nielsen Media Research. This means that 0.14 percent of all households with televisions watched the episode. This was a 19% increase in viewership from the previous episode, which was watched by 0.255 million viewers with a 0.14 in the 18-49 demographics. It was also a slight increase over the previous season premiere, which was watched by 0.285 million viewers with a 0.14 in the demo.

=== Critical reviews ===
"The Gang Inflates" received very positive reviews from critics. Ross Bonaime of Collider wrote, "While 'The Gang Inflates' does do an admirable job of explaining inflation in a way that even Charlie can understand it, there's no real larger message with this concept. This certainly isn't a choice that damns the new season in any way, but considering the topics this season decides to explore, it is a bit unusual that the show doesn't attempt a grander point with these issues."

Emily Zemler of The New York Observer wrote, "It's a classic Sunny episode and a perfect way to begin a season, reminding viewers how clever the series can be when it takes on contemporary issues." Ray Flook of Bleeding Cool wrote, "Frank & Charlie's apartment actually has a bathroom and a second bedroom – and it's had it the entire time! After 15 seasons, I'm not sure what to do with that info… game-changer?"

Rendy Jones of Paste wrote, "With a newfound understanding of the current economic state, Mac and Dennis come up with an inflatable furniture scheme to get quick cash. Of course, it's only a short matter of time before matters become obscenely insane." Joel Keller of Decider wrote, "Always Sunny never changes, and that's a beautiful thing. The show can't go on forever, but it's a great thing that the gang can still get together and make us laugh."
