= The Gang Makes Lethal Weapon 7 =

- It's Always Sunny in Philadelphia episode
- Episode no.: Season 15; Episode 2
- Directed by: Pete Chatmon
- Written by: Keyonna Taylor; Katie McElhenney
- Cinematography by: John Tanzer
- Editing by: Josh Drisko
- Production code: XIP15002
- Original air date: December 1, 2021
- Running time: 21 minutes

Guest appearances
- Artemis Pebdani as Artemis; Marcuis W. Harris as Pepper Jack; Geoffrey Owens as "Don Cheadle"

Episode chronology
← Previous "2020: A Year in Review"	Next → "The Gang Buys a Roller Rink"
- It's Always Sunny in Philadelphia season 15

"The Gang Makes Lethal Weapon 7" is the second episode of the fifteenth season of the American sitcom television series It's Always Sunny in Philadelphia. It is the 156th overall episode of the series and was written by story editors Keyonna Taylor and Katie McElhenney and directed by Pete Chatmon. It originally aired on FXX on December 1, 2021, airing back-to-back with the previous episode, "2020: A Year in Review".

The series follows "The Gang", a group of five misfit friends: twins Dennis and Deandra "(Sweet) Dee" Reynolds, their friends Charlie Kelly and Ronald "Mac" McDonald, and Frank Reynolds, Dennis' and Dee's legal father. The Gang runs the fictional Paddy's Pub, an unsuccessful Irish bar in South Philadelphia. In the episode, upon discovering that their self-made Lethal Weapon sequels have been pulled from the local library, the Gang decides to address their political incorrectness by making the sequel Lethal Weapon 7. The episode is a continuation of the 2010 episode "Dee Reynolds: Shaping America's Youth" and the 2013 episode "The Gang Makes Lethal Weapon 6", both of which involve the Gang recreating their own version of Lethal Weapon. The episode was described as a meta-commentary on previous episodes being removed from streaming due to their use of blackface.

According to Nielsen Media Research, the episode was seen by an estimated 0.237 million household viewers and gained a 0.11 ratings share among adults aged 18–49. The episode received positive reviews from critics, who praised the series' meta-commentary on the previous episodes and the performances of the cast.

== Plot ==
The Gang's Lethal Weapon 5 and Lethal Weapon 6 films are removed from the local library, being deemed "insensitive" for their use of blackface (and redface). Frank (Danny DeVito) is outraged at the decision but the rest of the Gang state it's time to move on from these and there's only one thing they can do to do the right thing: make Lethal Weapon 7.

The Gang intends to make a film that can be enjoyable, given modern ethical standards. For the first take, Dee (Kaitlin Olson) plays Martin Riggs and Frank gets a local pimp named Pepper Jack (previously seen in "Mac Is a Serial Killer") to play Roger Murtaugh. Dee's poor acting, Frank's demand to have sex with a prostitute on screen, and Pepper Jack's attitude (as well as Dennis becoming terrified after remembering his last confrontation with Pepper Jack) prompt constant changes to the production. Mac (Rob McElhenney) can't bring himself to give notes to Pepper Jack after Dennis tells him why he is scared of Pepper Jack, and lets Pepper Jack continue acting as himself. Mac also hires Artemis to be his assistant director.

In the second take, Dee has been dropped and Charlie (Charlie Day) now plays Riggs. The production still stalls due to Dee eventually finding she was replaced and Pepper Jack acting intensely in his role, which contrasts Murtaugh's intended personality. For the next take, they get "Don Cheadle", who posed as Donovan McNabb in "The Gang Gets Invincible" and as Tiger Woods in "Frank's Pretty Woman", to play Murtaugh and Pepper Jack is given Riggs' role. While the Gang is satisfied with their performances, they question Dee playing a villain named Karen White, thinking it will look bad to portray entitled white women as villains. They decide to make the villain a tidal wave. In the next take, the Gang is stunned at the poor quality of the film.

While the Gang considers other options, Dennis (Glenn Howerton) reveals that dating many younger women and rejecting their ideologies prompted them to dump him. He then found out that by agreeing to their ideology, he could use it to his advantage. They decide to do the "woke thing" and hand over creative control to the imposter. The Gang goes to the screening of the film, which is now titled White Saviors, a documentary that exposes their racism and ignorance. The Gang is angry at losing Lethal Weapon 7 and Dennis proclaims that there is only one thing left to do: make Lethal Weapon 8 and Mac wants to play Murtaugh again.

== Production ==
=== Development ===
In November 2021, it was reported that the second episode of the fifteenth season would be titled "The Gang Makes Lethal Weapon 7", and was to be directed by Pete Chatmon and written by story editors Keyonna Taylor and Katie McElhenney.

=== Writing ===
Rob McElhenney said that the episode served as a way to explore the Gang's use of blackface and acknowledge its wrong use, explaining "I find that my barometer is off for what's appropriate sometimes in situations because, like, we've spent 15 years making a show about the worst people on the planet, and because it's satire, we lean so heavily into this idea. And then we are always, like, right on the razor’s edge, but that’s the only way that satire works. And then I go and do something else, and I may be pitching something, and then I realize, like, oh, it's wholly inappropriate for the show what I'm doing because these are supposed to be real human beings, whereas, on Sunny, they are cartoon characters, and we can, kind of, get away with a whole lot more."

== Reception ==
=== Viewers ===
In its original American broadcast, "The Gang Makes Lethal Weapon 7" was seen by an estimated 0.237 million household viewers and gained a 0.11 ratings share among adults aged 18–49, according to Nielsen Media Research. This means that 0.11 percent of all households with televisions watched the episode. This was a 17% decrease in viewership from the previous episode, which was watched by 0.285 million viewers with a 0.14 in the 18-49 demographics.

=== Critical reviews ===
"The Gang Makes Lethal Weapon 7" received positive reviews from critics. Dennis Perkins of The A.V. Club gave the episode a "B−" grade and wrote, "It's a fitting way for the episode to land what had been a shaky enterprise in on-the-nose comic storytelling, but these first two episodes both hint that the Gang could use some new scenery. On to Ireland, I guess."

Ross Bonaime of Collider wrote, "Mac accurately describes the last few years by saying The Gang has done 'a lot of learning, a lot of growing, and a lot of being scared.' It's a perfect encapsulation of what the world has gone through, and while we may be tired of reliving the recent past in entertainment, It's Always Sunny in Philadelphia's fifteenth season comments on modern idiocy without the fatigue we've come to expect. If anything, it's almost comforting to know that all of the insanity in our world has been thanks to the five owners of Paddy's Pub."

Liz Shannon Miller of Consequence wrote, "The show also directly acknowledges how the world has changed in the season's second episode, 'The Gang Makes Lethal Weapon 7', which comments on the fact that the show's previous episodes featuring Lethal Weapon parodies are no longer streaming due to the use of blackface. Said comment is made most importantly by actually involving Black actors and Taylor, a Black writer, in the episode, while continuing to evolve the show's take on how to approach both its politically incorrect past while still poking fun at the unacceptable — and managing to be funny as hell in the process." Ray Flook of Bleeding Cool wrote, "Just like it seemed only right that The Gang's response to being shown the error of their ways with 'White Saviors' was to... you guessed it. Make 'Lethal Weapon 8'. Because The Gang is never more at its best than when it gives the audience a chance to learn while they stay obliviously trapped in their Paddy's bubble and we wouldn't have it any other way."
