= The Gang Replaces Dee with a Monkey =

- It's Always Sunny in Philadelphia episode
- Episode no.: Season 15; Episode 4
- Directed by: Todd Biermann
- Written by: Glenn Howerton; Nina Pedrad
- Cinematography by: John Tanzer
- Editing by: Scott Draper
- Production code: XIP15004
- Original air date: December 8, 2021
- Running time: 21 minutes

Guest appearances
- Jack Plotnick as Michael Goldmate; Iman Karram as Kiki; Michael Mealor as Tony

Episode chronology
← Previous "The Gang Buys a Roller Rink"	Next → "The Gang Goes to Ireland"
- It's Always Sunny in Philadelphia season 15

"The Gang Replaces Dee with a Monkey" is the fourth episode of the fifteenth season of the American sitcom television series It's Always Sunny in Philadelphia. It is the 158th overall episode of the series and was written by main cast member Glenn Howerton and co-executive producer Nina Pedrad and directed by Todd Biermann. It originally aired on FXX on December 8, 2021, airing back-to-back with the previous episode, "The Gang Buys a Roller Rink".

The series follows "The Gang", a group of five misfit friends: twins Dennis and Deandra "(Sweet) Dee" Reynolds, their friends Charlie Kelly and Ronald "Mac" McDonald, and Frank Reynolds, Dennis' and Dee's legal father. The Gang runs the fictional Paddy's Pub, an unsuccessful Irish bar in South Philadelphia. In the episode, the guys think Dee may be starting menopause and, unwilling to tolerate her incoming behavior, decide to replace her with a monkey who serves great beers. Meanwhile, Dee is actually performing in character for a role. After she is rejected, she decides to open her own acting class for easy money. The episode serves to set up a story arc where the Gang goes to Ireland.

According to Nielsen Media Research, the episode was seen by an estimated 0.235 million household viewers and gained a 0.14 ratings share among adults aged 18–49. The episode received mostly positive reviews from critics, who praised the writing, performances and set-up for the coming episodes.

== Plot ==
Dee (Kaitlin Olson) complains of feeling too hot and storms out of the bar. The Gang questions her behavior, with Frank (Danny DeVito) deducing she may be starting menopause. Unwilling to tolerate Dee's new behavior, they decide to replace her and joke that even a monkey could do her job.

Dee's behavior is actually revealed to be method acting in preparation for a TV series audition, but her audition is rejected by the casting directors. Back at the bar, Charlie (Charlie Day) expresses desire to go on vacation but Mac (Rob McElhenney) and Dennis (Glenn Howerton) reject his idea of going to Pittsburgh. Frank suddenly shows up with a monkey, planning to use it as Dee's replacement. They object until the monkey - which was trained to appear in movies - prepares a good beer for Dennis.

Dee decides to earn money by teaching an acting class where she gives poor advice to aspiring actors. She enjoys wielding emotional power, but when the director of the TV series calls to offer her a role, she abandons her class. At Paddy's, the guys continue debating where to go on vacation while drinking beers served by the monkey. They wake up the next day hungover and covered in scratches with the bar trashed and all the money gone. They also all have a gross and sour feeling in their mouths, and conclude that the monkey had sex with them while they were unconscious. Frank reveals that the monkey comes from a lineage of abused Hollywood stunt animals beginning with his grandfather who was owned by Roscoe Arbuckle, and explains that the trauma causes these monkeys to run away and become alcoholic scam artists.

Dennis remembers that the boys came up with the perfect vacation destination while they were drunk. They see a chalkboard with the words "monkey beer island of green and fight". Deducing that the monkey poured whiskey in their drinks, they replace "monkey" with "whiskey". Dee returns, announcing that she booked the role and will leave tomorrow for Ireland. The guys realize they picked Ireland ("whiskey beer island of green and fight") for their vacation too.

== Production ==
=== Development ===
In November 2021, it was reported that the fourth episode of the fifteenth season would be titled "The Gang Replaces Dee with a Monkey", and was to be directed by Todd Biermann and written by main cast member Glenn Howerton and co-executive producer Nina Pedrad. This was Biermann's 16th directing credit, Howerton's 43rd writing credit and Pedrad's 1st writing credit.

== Reception ==
=== Viewers ===
In its original American broadcast, "The Gang Replaces Dee with a Monkey" was seen by an estimated 0.235 million household viewers and gained a 0.14 ratings share among adults aged 18–49, according to Nielsen Media Research. This means that 0.14 percent of all households with televisions watched the episode. This was a 27% decrease in viewership from the previous episode, which was watched by 0.318 million viewers with a 0.18 in the 18-49 demographics.

=== Critical reviews ===
"The Gang Replaces Dee with a Monkey" received mostly positive reviews from critics. Dennis Perkins of The A.V. Club gave the episode a "B+" grade and wrote, "This is more like it. Sure, this fourth episode has its shakier elements, and there aren't many Sunny outings where the A and B stories are so tenuously connected, but at least 'The Gang Replaces Dee With A Monkey' is recognizable in its go-for-broke outrageousness. And, it must be said, the Gang does, in fact, replace Sweet Dee with an actual monkey. So, props for that."

Ross Bonaime of Collider wrote, "It's Always Sunny in Philadelphia is as hysterical and shocking as it ever has been. Moments like Charlie's confusion over Pennsylvania's geography, Dee's horrible acting class, and the revelation of what made Dennis the way he is are all likely to go down as classic It's Always Sunny scenes." Ray Flook of Bleeding Cool wrote, "And just like that, we're back to The Gang wielding a ten-ton satirical hammer by taking on women in the workplace and the denigrating way many of them still get treated in their respective professions." Brian Tallerico of RogerEbert.com wrote, "The season really gets going when a series of events sends the gang to Ireland for the first time as multiple episodes unfold across the Atlantic Ocean. The kickstart to these episodes — 'The Gang Replaces Dee with a Monkey' — is one of the funniest in all 15 seasons."
