= The Gang Goes to Ireland =

- It's Always Sunny in Philadelphia episode
- Episode no.: Season 15; Episode 5
- Directed by: Megan Ganz
- Written by: Rob McElhenney; Charlie Day; Glenn Howerton
- Cinematography by: John Tanzer
- Editing by: John Drisko
- Production code: XIP15005
- Original air date: December 15, 2021
- Running time: 21 minutes

Guest appearances
- Mary Elizabeth Ellis as The Waitress; Sandy Martin as Mrs. Mac

Episode chronology
← Previous "The Gang Replaces Dee with a Monkey"	Next → "The Gang's Still in Ireland"
- It's Always Sunny in Philadelphia season 15

"The Gang Goes to Ireland" is the fifth episode of the fifteenth season of the American sitcom television series It's Always Sunny in Philadelphia. It is the 159th overall episode of the series and was written by main cast members Rob McElhenney, Charlie Day, and Glenn Howerton and directed by executive producer Megan Ganz. It originally aired on FXX on December 15, 2021, airing back-to-back with the follow-up episode, "The Gang's Still in Ireland".

The series follows "The Gang", a group of five misfit friends: twins Dennis and Deandra "(Sweet) Dee" Reynolds, their friends Charlie Kelly and Ronald "Mac" McDonald, and Frank Reynolds, Dennis' and Dee's legal father. The Gang runs the fictional Paddy's Pub, an unsuccessful Irish bar in South Philadelphia. In the episode, the Gang goes to Ireland after subduing Dee and using her first-class ticket to get them all "coach" tickets. There, Mac and Charlie debate about their Irish heritage while Frank needs to destroy evidence linking him to Jeffrey Epstein. The episode starts a story arc where the Gang goes to Ireland.

According to Nielsen Media Research, the episode was seen by an estimated 0.285 million household viewers and gained a 0.13 ratings share among adults aged 18–49. The episode received very positive reviews from critics, who praised the writing, performances and dark humor in the episode.

== Plot ==
Dee (Kaitlin Olson) wakes up in a bar with the Gang, who reveal that they split her first-class airline ticket and swapped it for five "coach" tickets to Dublin and drugged her so she would sleep during the flight. A shocked Dee refuses to accept it until she walks outside to discover that she is really on Dame Street in Ireland. She is then hit by a car.

The Gang drops Dee at the set of the TV production but she finds that she received a hematoma due to the car injury. Frank (Danny DeVito) then takes Dee and Dennis (Glenn Howerton) to the headquarters for his company, Frank's Fluids LLC, which is actually a dingy office for one of his shell corporations. Frank reveals that the company served as the beverage supplier of Jeffrey Epstein, with Frank even visiting Epstein's island, Little Saint James, although he claims he only went for the snorkeling. He asks for their help with destroying implicating documents, which they forcefully accept as Frank had put their names on the business. As Dennis refused to get vaccinated and is constantly coughing, the Gang deduces he has been infected with COVID.

Charlie (Charlie Day) and Mac (Rob McElhenney) start debating on their Irish heritage, with both questioning who is more Irish. Charlie reveals that he can read Irish-Gaelic text, having learned through a pen pal named Shelley Kelly. Mac calls his mother but she reveals that he is not Irish, his father's actual name is Luther Vandross, that he is Dutch, that she is Dutch and that Mac is Dutch. Meanwhile, Dennis tries to flirt with a redhead, but is disappointed when he believes the woman is using a wig as it doesn't smell like hair and leaves after she tries to take his temperature. Dennis is now refusing to drive on the correct side of the road, claiming that driving on the right is safer because they all swerve out of his way.

Dee eventually gets back to the studio to find the role has been recast as she is now two hours late. It is revealed the role will now be played by The Waitress (Mary Elizabeth Ellis). Dee begs the assistant for another role, and he gives her the role of an abused housewife. As she leaves, she is hit by the car driven by Dennis, who was arguing with the Gang. The Gang then decides to put Dee in the trunk of the car and leave the set.

== Production ==
=== Development ===
In November 2021, it was reported that the fifth episode of the fifteenth season would be titled "The Gang Goes to Ireland", and was to be directed by executive producer Megan Ganz and written by main cast members Rob McElhenney, Charlie Day and Glenn Howerton. This was Ganz's 1st directing credit, McElhenney's 56th writing credit, Day's 62nd writing credit, and Howerton's 44th writing credit.

=== Filming ===
In August and September 2021, images circulated where the cast teased that they were filming in Ireland. In November 2021, it was confirmed that the series would have episodes set in Ireland. However, due to COVID-19 restrictions in the country, the series used Bodega Bay, California as a stand-in for Ireland.

== Reception ==
=== Viewers ===
In its original American broadcast, "The Gang Goes to Ireland" was seen by an estimated 0.285 million household viewers and gained a 0.13 ratings share among adults aged 18–49, according to Nielsen Media Research. This means that 0.13 percent of all households with televisions watched the episode. This was a 21% increase in viewership from the previous episode, which was watched by 0.235 million viewers with a 0.14 in the 18-49 demographics.

=== Critical reviews ===
"The Gang Goes to Ireland" received very positive reviews from critics. Dennis Perkins of The A.V. Club gave the episode a "B+" grade and wrote, "It's a maddeningly tough balance to find, and the fact that Sunny can still tiptoe right up to the edge so expertly remains a miracle of long-form TV storytelling. These two episodes give each member of the Gang enough narrative and thematic rope to allow them just a peek at the emerald sunlight outside of Paddy's, Philly, and their rats' nest of misdeeds and entanglements. They're still awful, naturally. But 'The Gang Goes To Ireland' and 'The Gang's Still In Ireland' serve as a skillfully constructed scaffold for when those five ropes inevitably snap taut."

Ross Bonaime of Collider wrote, "The trip to Ireland has both Charlie and Mac coming to grips with where they come from. It's astounding that after all this time, It's Always Sunny in Philadelphia can still expand this world, evolve these characters, and find new facets of these dynamics that we never even knew we wanted." Liz Shannon Miller of Consequence wrote, "Much of the latter part of the season ends up taking place in Ireland, for which the production did travel to the Emerald Isles for some location shooting. To explain what leads the gang there would take a very long time and wouldn't be nearly as amusing as watching it yourself, but the extended international trip features a fantastic guest star in Colm Meaney, some truly beautiful Irish vistas, and a lot of Gaelic jokes." Brian Tallerico of RogerEbert.com wrote, "The season really gets going when a series of events sends the gang to Ireland for the first time as multiple episodes unfold across the Atlantic Ocean."
