= The Gang Buys a Roller Rink =

- It's Always Sunny in Philadelphia episode
- Episode no.: Season 15; Episode 3
- Directed by: Richie Keen
- Written by: Rob Rosell; David Hornsby
- Cinematography by: John Tanzer
- Editing by: Scott Draper
- Production code: XIP15003
- Original air date: December 8, 2021
- Running time: 21 minutes

Episode chronology
← Previous "The Gang Makes Lethal Weapon 7"	Next → "The Gang Replaces Dee with a Monkey"
- It's Always Sunny in Philadelphia season 15

"The Gang Buys a Roller Rink" is the third episode of the fifteenth season of the American sitcom television series It's Always Sunny in Philadelphia. It is the 157th overall episode of the series and was written by executive producers Rob Rosell and David Hornsby and directed by Richie Keen. It originally aired on FXX on December 8, 2021, airing back-to-back with the follow-up episode, "The Gang Replaces Dee with a Monkey".

The series follows "The Gang", a group of five misfit friends: the twins Dennis and Deandra "(Sweet) Dee" Reynolds, their friends Charlie Kelly and Ronald "Mac" McDonald, and Frank Reynolds, Dennis' and Dee's legal father. The Gang runs the fictional Paddy's Pub, an unsuccessful Irish bar in South Philadelphia. In the episode, when their favourite roller rink is being closed down, the Gang flashbacks to 1998 when Mac, Dennis and Charlie tried to buy the rink but instead end up buying Paddy's.

According to Nielsen Media Research, the episode was seen by an estimated 0.318 million household viewers and gained a 0.18 ratings share among adults aged 18–49. The episode received mixed-to-positive reviews from critics, some praised the exploration of the Gang's origin while others found it derivative of other flashback episodes.

== Plot ==
Charlie (Charlie Day) informs the Gang that a roller rink in South Philadelphia is closing, saddening them as they had good memories of the rink. The Gang then remember the last time they visited the rink, in 1998.

In 1998, Charlie works at the rink as the second in command of the establishment, and Mac (Rob McElhenney) takes care of the roller skates while he sells marijuana. They are joined by Sweet Dee (Kaitlin Olson) and Dennis (Glenn Howerton), who are shown to be caring and educated. Dee is set to leave for Hollywood the next day while Dennis is working for Frank (Danny DeVito), although he has no idea what his business is. He decides to visit Frank at a hotel to see him "doing business". Frank fails to understand this and allows him to witness him having sex with a prostitute, shocking Dennis. As Dennis is complaining, Frank decides to fire him.

Charlie overhears his boss Smokey (Frank Collison) talking on the phone about considering selling his joint. He decides to accept Mac's offer in joining his drug dealing business, for which Mac carries a gun. However, the buyers refuse to pay him and leave with their drugs and Charlie finds that Mac's gun is actually just a gun handle. They are joined by Dennis at lunch, and the three consider investing on their own business by buying the rink. They then witness Dee and her group perform at the rink, when Dee accidentally falls due to Charlie loosening her skates, banging her head. Due to her concussion, Dee suddenly goes on an angry tirade at them, refusing to join them in their business.

Charlie, Mac and Dennis then talk to Smokey about buying the rink. However, Smokey doesn't own the place (he only works for the free parking) and he actually owns a nearby bar. They visit the bar, which turns out to be Paddy's. Noting its sad state, they claim they will change it for the better and become successful, buying it with Charlie's savings. The scene returns to present day, with the Gang noting that nothing changed at all, and that Dee is still suffering from her concussion (the reason for her inverted rude personality).

== Production ==
=== Development ===
In November 2021, it was reported that the third episode of the fifteenth season would be titled "The Gang Buys a Roller Rink", and was to be directed by Richie Keen and written by executive producers Rob Rosell and David Hornsby. This was Keen's 12th directing credit, Rosell's 24th writing credit and Hornsby's 31st writing credit The first image from the episode was teased in October 2021, when the crew confirmed that filming on the season had wrapped.

=== Location ===
The episode was shot at the Moonlight Rollerway skating rink in Glendale, California.

== Reception ==
=== Viewers ===
In its original American broadcast, "The Gang Buys a Roller Rink" was seen by an estimated 0.318 million household viewers and gained a 0.18 ratings share among adults aged 18–49, according to Nielsen Media Research. This means that 0.18 percent of all households with televisions watched the episode. This was a 34% increase in viewership from the previous episode, which was watched by 0.237 million viewers with a 0.11 in the 18-49 demographics.

=== Critical reviews ===
"The Gang Buys a Roller Rink" received mixed-to-positive reviews from critics. Dennis Perkins of The A.V. Club gave the episode a "D+" grade and wrote, "Is 'The Gang Buys A Roller Rink' the worst episode in Sunny's legendarily consistent run? That's a tough one. It's not as aggressively, futilely unpleasant as 'Frank’s Brother', while fellow flashback episode 'The Gang Cracks The Liberty Bell' is merely as irrelevant a sideshow as a centuries-long game of telephone can be. But even those uncharacteristic missteps didn't feel like the work of It's Always Sunny imposters, and creatively spent ones at that. So, yes, this was the worst Sunny episode ever."

Ross Bonaime of Collider wrote, "'The Gang Buys a Roller Rink' explains quite a bit about why this group is the way they are, and explores the origins of Paddy's, and the trip to Ireland has both Charlie and Mac coming to grips with where they come from. It's astounding that after all this time, It's Always Sunny in Philadelphia can still expand this world, evolve these characters, and find new facets of these dynamics that we never even knew we wanted." Ray Flook of Bleeding Cool wrote, "While the season premiere may have been The Gang's statement on what's gone on in the country over the previous year, 'The Gang Buys A Roller Rink' was a statement on where they're at as they stare down the 15th season of a series they never imagined making it to air let alone find itself inching dangerously close to two decades on screens." Liz Shannon Miller of Consequence wrote, "At this point, It's Always Sunny might have made a name for itself as provocative entertainment, but there's a comfort to be found in its consistency. Not in terms of quality — like any creative enterprise, there are better episodes and worse ones — but in terms of its general dedication to a certain ethos, a skewed yet humane perspective on the world that has grown richer with every passing year. The characters stay dumb, but the show just gets smarter and smarter, and television as a medium is better for it."
