= 2020: A Year in Review =

- It's Always Sunny in Philadelphia episode
- Episode no.: Season 15; Episode 1
- Directed by: Todd Biermann
- Written by: Rob McElhenney; Charlie Day; Glenn Howerton
- Cinematography by: John Tanzer
- Editing by: Josh Drisko
- Production code: XIP15001
- Original air date: December 1, 2021
- Running time: 22 minutes

Guest appearance
- Brian Huskey as Gary

Episode chronology
← Previous "Waiting for Big Mo"	Next → "The Gang Makes Lethal Weapon 7"
- It's Always Sunny in Philadelphia season 15

"2020: A Year in Review" is the first episode of the fifteenth season of the American sitcom television series It's Always Sunny in Philadelphia. It is the 155th overall episode of the series and was written by series developers, executive producers and lead actors Rob McElhenney, Charlie Day, and Glenn Howerton and directed by Todd Biermann. It originally aired on FXX on December 1, 2021, airing back-to-back with the following episode, "The Gang Makes Lethal Weapon 7".

The series follows "The Gang", a group of five misfit friends: twins Dennis and Deandra "(Sweet) Dee" Reynolds, their friends Charlie Kelly and Ronald "Mac" McDonald, and Frank Reynolds, Dennis' and Dee's legal father. The Gang runs the fictional Paddy's Pub, an unsuccessful Irish bar in South Philadelphia. In the episode, the gang looks back on 2020 to justify their numerous PPP loans. In doing so, it is revealed that they contributed to the chaos of the past political year way more than anyone could have imagined. With the episode's airing, the series officially became the longest-running live-action comedy series in American television history, breaking the record set by The Adventures of Ozzie and Harriet.

According to Nielsen Media Research, the episode was seen by an estimated 0.285 million household viewers and gained a 0.14 ratings share among adults aged 18–49. The episode received generally positive reviews from critics, who praised the way the series integrated their storylines on the real-life events that occurred in 2020, although one critic unfavorably viewed the three different storylines as failed sketches.

== Plot ==
The gang welcomes a man named Gary (Brian Huskey), whom they assume will help them get a PPP loan. But Gary is actually there to collect three different loans, asking to explain what they have done with the money. The gang then explains how 2020 forced them to adapt to a new environment.

The first loan, "Punch Incorporated", was taken out by Mac (Rob McElhenney) and Dennis (Glenn Howerton). They used the loan to get riot gear to sell for the 2020 elections, but they used the opportunity to drive interest to their music careers and instead of prompting people to vote for real candidates, the poll is actually just to decide whether Donovan McNabb or Rocky Balboa is the better athlete because of a discussion they previously had. Their actions resulted in vote delays, although they claim this helped their music careers as business on the bar was dropping.

The second loan was taken out by Frank (Danny DeVito), named "Frank's Imports and Exports". Frank claims to have sludges imported and hair dye exported for himself. Tired of the lockdowns and stay-at-home orders, Frank constantly ignores proper safety protocols, like incorrectly wearing masks. He uses ingredients to create hair dye, like Chinese motor oil. He opens a business in an adult film store, helping men of a certain age with hair dyeing. Eventually, one of his clients turns out to be Rudy Giuliani. But Giulani's hair dye runs down his face during a press conference after the election, and Frank decides to end the business when he realizes his hair dye is no longer reliable.

The third loan is for a clothing line named "Garments and Varmints", issued by Charlie (Charlie Day) and Dee (Kaitlin Olson). They decided to open a mask business during the COVID-19 pandemic although Charlie is only making costume masks. They combine their ideas and help QAnon with some raccoon-pelt costumes. They sell the costumes to Jake Angeli, who wears it during the 2021 Capitol attack.

The gang once again tries to get a loan but Gary states that he will not help them, calling them out for their careless approach to their businesses, which all went bankrupt. The gang then states that had "the other guy" won the election, their businesses would have prospered. Gary assumes they mean Donald Trump but they are actually referring to Kanye West's election campaign. A shocked Gary then leaves, refusing to believe they participated in all these major events. The final montage shows that the gang was present in many events, including the 2021 Capitol attack.

== Production ==
=== Development ===
In May 2018, ahead of the series' thirteenth season, Charlie Day said the cast and crew intended to get the series to a fifteenth season, saying "I imagine we'll all want to hold the record for the longest-running comedy in America. Fifteen would be the record for the longest live-action comedy, so we'll probably try and break that record if we can." In January 2020, renewal talks were underway, with FX Networks and FX Productions Chairman John Landgraf and FX Entertainment President Eric Schrier expressing interest in keeping the show on the air. In May 2020, FX renewed It's Always Sunny in Philadelphia for a fifteenth season, with Rob McElhenney indicating writing had already started on the season. With the renewal, the series became the longest-running live-action comedy series in American television history, replacing The Adventures of Ozzie and Harriet, which ran for 14 seasons between 1952 and 1966. In November 2021, it was announced that the season would premiere on December 1, 2021.

In August 2021, it was reported that the first episode of the fifteenth season would be titled "2020: A Year in Review", and was to be directed by Todd Biermann and written by series developers, executive producers and lead actors Rob McElhenney, Charlie Day, and Glenn Howerton. The episode was McElhenney's 55th writing credit, Day's 61st writing credit, and Howerton's 42nd writing credit.

=== Writing ===
Rob McElhenney said that the series would address the ongoing COVID-19 pandemic, saying "Well, we actually do have an episode called 'The Gang Gets Quarantined' where we quarantine ourselves in the bar. I think there's a big flu going around Philadelphia or something like that. When we come back, don't worry, we will address all this in the way only Sunny can."

=== Filming ===
Filming for the episode and the season started in May 2021.

== Reception ==
=== Viewers ===
In its original American broadcast, "2020: A Year in Review" was seen by an estimated 0.285 million household viewers and gained a 0.14 ratings share among adults aged 18–49, according to Nielsen Media Research. This means that 0.14 percent of all households with televisions watched the episode. This was a 20% increase in viewership from the previous episode, which was watched by 0.236 million viewers with a 0.13 in the 18-49 demographics. But it was a 32% decrease in viewership from the previous season premiere, which was watched by 0.481 million viewers with a 0.28 in the 18-49 demographics.

=== Critical reviews ===
"2020: A Year in Review" received generally positive reviews from critics. Ross Bonaime of Collider wrote, "Season 15 of It's Always Sunny shows no sign of this now record-breaking show slowing down, as it continues its reign as one of the most ingenious, unexpected, and uproarious series of the 21st century."

Liz Shannon Miller of Consequence wrote, "It's not only a great and necessary scene-setter, given the show's longer-than-usual hiatus (the last season ended in November 2019), but it also threads the needle admirably when it comes to tackling some of the most politically tumultuous moments of the last two years, with plenty of unexpected curveballs along the way." Ray Flook of Bleeding Cool wrote, "They had no clue that they were doing any of that, but they're okay with it since their guy wasn't being given a fair chance and that's why he lost the election. 'Their guy'? Yup. Kanye West. And that's when it all came together for me and why it worked so well. Because what I thought was going to be a Forrest Gump/Zelig-like "welcome back" by The Gang as they took some fun shots at the past year became a lot more than that."

Dennis Perkins of The A.V. Club gave the episode a "C+" grade and wrote, "It's an uncharacteristically wheezy first episode out of the gate that leaves It's Always Sunny looking distressingly ordinary. Of course both the 2020 election and a global pandemic were going to bring out the worst in the Gang. But the Gang's worst is usually a whole lot better than this."
