= Flipped (TV series) =

- Poster
- Written by: Damon Jones; Steve Mallory
- Directed by: Ryan Case
- Starring: Will Forte; Kaitlin Olson; Arturo Castro; Eva Longoria; Andy García; Jerry O'Connell; Rebecca Romijn
- Original language: English
- No. of seasons: 1
- No. of episodes: 11

Production
- Executive producers: Ryan Case; Joe Farrell; Damon Jones; Steve Mallory; Steve Burgess
- Producers: Adrien Finkel; Whitney Hodack
- Cinematography: Topher Osborn
- Production company: Funny or Die

Original release
- Network: Quibi
- Release: April 6 – April 16, 2020

Flipped is an American comedy television series written by Steve Mallory and Damon Jones that debuted on Quibi on April 6, 2020. Flipped is a feature film broken into multiple chapters under 10 minutes in length, the first three of which premiered upon Quibi's launch.

== Premise ==
Two self-proclaimed home renovation experts, intent on basic cable fame, are kidnapped by drug cartel members and forced to renovate their homes. Olson says the series is inspired by Chip and Joanna Gaines.

== Cast ==
- Will Forte as Jann Melfi, Cricket's husband and a self-proclaimed artist who views himself as an intellectual, even if his on-camera commentaries don't always make sense.
- Kaitlin Olson as Cricket Melfi, Jann's wife and a woman who wants things done the right way or not at all.
- Arturo Castro as Diego, a Mexican sicario and gangster who works for Rumualdo Vasco, a powerful Mexican drug lord and cartel leader.
- Eva Longoria as Fidelia, Rumualdo's hot wife.
- Andy García as Rumualdo Vasco, a powerful Mexican drug lord, cartel leader and Diego's boss.
- Jerry O'Connell as Chazz Connelly, a co-host of "Pros and Connellys" and Tiffany's husband.
- Rebecca Romijn as Tiffany Connelly, a co-host of "Pros and Connellys" and Chazz's wife.

== Episodes ==
No.	Title	Directed by	Written by	Original release date
1	"An Artistic Vision"	Ryan Case	Damon Jones & Steve Mallory	April 6, 2020
Unemployed couple Jann and Cricket Melfi see an opportunity for their future after watching a home renovation television show.
2	"Demo Day"	Ryan Case	Damon Jones & Steve Mallory	April 6, 2020
While renovating a house as part of their own show, Jann and Cricket stumble upon a large amount of cash hidden in the walls.
3	"The Budget"	Ryan Case	Damon Jones & Steve Mallory	April 6, 2020
Cricket and Jann burn through the found money by renovating the house extravagantly and hiring a professional film crew. Then, they are visited by a set of criminals.
4	"Sizzle Reel"	Ryan Case	Damon Jones & Steve Mallory	April 7, 2020
Cartel member Diego is impressed with the luxury of the house and can't believe they were so stupid to not take the money and run to another country. The Melfis show Diego their sizzle reel.
5	"Exploring New Markets"	Ryan Case	Damon Jones & Steve Mallory	April 8, 2020
Diego forces Cricket and Jann to earn back the stolen money by renovating his mansion in Mexico.
6	"Finding Good Designers"	Ryan Case	Damon Jones & Steve Mallory	April 9, 2020
Diego's boss, Rumualdo is impressed with Jann and Cricket's remodeling work. To please his boss, Diego gives Jann and Cricket to him, so they can remodel Rumualdo's house.
7	"Putting Clients First"	Ryan Case	Damon Jones & Steve Mallory	April 10, 2020
While Jann and Rumualdo bond over their love for music, Fidelia makes it clear she doesn't appreciate Cricket's remodeling plans.
8	"Creative Differences"	Ryan Case	Damon Jones & Steve Mallory	April 13, 2020
The Melfis expect their remodel of Rumualdo's beach estate will set them free. But Diego intends to use them for his own business interests.
9	"Expanding Your Brand"	Ryan Case	Damon Jones & Steve Mallory	April 14, 2020
Jann and Cricket learn that auditions from Mexico are welcomed for a new home renovation TV show, they start creating a new sizzle reel unnoticed.
10	"Escaping Bad Contracts"	Ryan Case	Damon Jones & Steve Mallory	April 15, 2020
The Melfis made it to the final of the auditions and need to come for Los Angeles for it. Jann and Cricket secretly escape from the cartel at night.
11	"The Work Is Never Quite Done"	Ryan Case	Damon Jones & Steve Mallory	April 16, 2020
When the Melfis finally make it to Los Angeles, it turns out their audition is not for a TV show, but for the FBI.

== Reception ==
On Rotten Tomatoes, the series has a 71% rating with an average score of 7.25 out of 10 based on 24 reviews. The site's critical consensus read: "Flipped's formatting doesn't do it many favors, but Kaitlin Olson and Will Forte dig into their characters with such skill and delight that it's hard not to have a good time anyway."

== Accolades ==
Year	Award	Category	Nominee(s)	Result	Ref.
2020	Primetime Emmy Awards	Outstanding Actress in a Short Form Comedy or Drama Series	Kaitlin Olson	Nominated	
