= Anna Kerth =

Polish actress (born 1980)

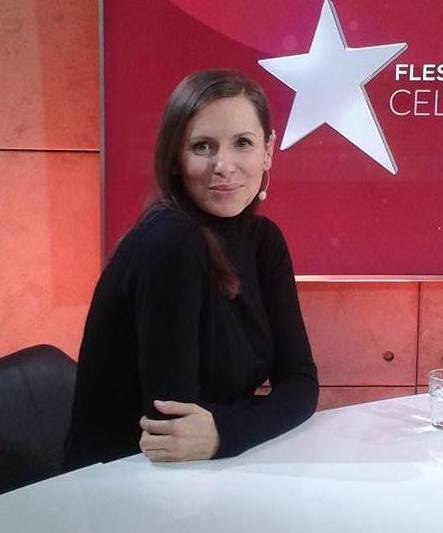
- Anna Kerth in 2016
- Born: 1 November 1980 (age 45); Gdańsk, Poland
- Occupation: Actress
- Notable work: River City

Anna Kerth (born 1 November 1980) is a Polish actress who starred in BBC Scotland's soap opera River City as Lena Krausky in 2006/2007. In Poland she is mostly known for being part of the main cast in the popular soap opera Na Wspólnej.

Kerth was nominated to British Academy Scotland New Talent Awards for her role in Running in Traffic.

== Filmography ==
- 2004: Katatonia, as Marta
- 2006–present: Na Wspólnej, as Małgosia Zimińska
- 2006–2007: River City, as Lena Krausky
- 2008: Last Supper, as Mother
- 2009 - Running in Traffic, as Kayla Golebiowski
- 2009 - Personal Affairs, as Lena
- 2010: Happy Birthday Mom, as Katerina
- 2012: Jak głęboki jest ocean, as Monica
- 2013: Na dystans, as Matka
- 2013: Ojcze masz, as Pani Doktor
- 2014: Nie da się zabić tego miasta, as Janina Momontowicz
