= Running in Traffic =

- Directed by: Dale Corlett
- Written by: Bryan Larkin
- Screenplay by: Bryan Larkin; Dale Corlett
- Story by: Bryan Larkin
- Starring: Bryan Larkin; Kenneth Cranham; Anna Kerth
- Cinematography: George Geddes
- Edited by: Brian McInnis
- Music by: Gabriel Currington
- Production companies: Dabhand Films, Alcoba Films, Jigsaw Productions
- Release date: 27 June 2009 (EIFF)
- Running time: 97 minutes
- Country: United Kingdom
- Language: English

Running in Traffic is a dramatic Scottish feature film. The story follows the lives of two central characters, Joe Cullen, played by Bryan Larkin, and Kayla Golebiowski, played by Anna Kerth, as they try to rebuild their lives after two unrelated tragedies. The central plot centers on how two strangers lives can impact one another. The film also stars Kenneth Cranham in the role of Bill Cullen, Cullen's uncle. It was first screened at the Edinburgh International Film Festival in 2009. It was directed by Dale Corlett and written by Bryan Larkin.

The film won numerous awards including the Apollo Award for Excellence in Norway and the BAFTA Scotland New Talent Award in 2009 for producing. It was also nominated in both the acting and directing categories.
