= Bryan Larkin =

Scottish actor, writer, producer and filmmaker

- Born: 7 August 1973 (age 52); Glasgow, Scotland
- Occupations: Actor, filmmaker
- Years active: 2002–present

Bryan Larkin (born 7 August 1973) is a Scottish actor, writer, producer and self-taught filmmaker. He was awarded the Trailblazer award at the Edinburgh International Film Festival in 2009. He is best known for his role of SAS Captain in London Has Fallen, directed by Babak Najafi, and the leading role of Dolokhov in Outpost: Rise of the Spetsnaz.

== Early life ==
Larkin was born in Glasgow and grew up in East Kilbride in Scotland to parents Frank Larkin and Andrine Larkin. He has one sister, Gillian. He trained at Langside college in Glasgow. He is a self-taught filmmaker and writer. His first short film, Reflections of a Life, as writer and director, premiered at the Sundance Film Festival in 2004.

== Career ==
Larkin's career has been marked by playing on the duality of vulnerable but tough types. His performances often demonstrate a depth and complexity to otherwise two-dimensional characters. This work can be further validated in his choice of roles in action films Battleground, written and directed by Neil MacKay, and Outpost: Rise of the Spetsnaz, by Scotland-born screenwriter Rae Brunton.

After guest roles in Scottish TV shows Taggart, Rebus and River City, he wrote and starred in the short film SCENE, for which he won a BAFTA Scotland Award for his performance. He later played the lead role of Joe Cullen in the BAFTA Scotland winning film Running in Traffic opposite Kenneth Cranham. He shares a second BAFTA Scotland Award with the film's co-producers, Marc Twynholm and Abigail Howkins. Running in Traffic also received its world premiere at the Edinburgh International Film Festival in 2009.

His television appearances include Doctors, playing the guest lead role of Axel Hayley in the episode "The Messenger", as well as the role of Geordie in season one of Outlander. In 2015, he played the recurring character of Eddie in series three of Shetland for BBC Scotland, opposite Game of Thrones star Ciarán Hinds.

He played the role of Robert Eldridge Dean in the American depression-era film The Red Machine, written and directed by Alec Boehm and Stephanie Argy, and the lead role of Mitch in the action film Battleground, written and directed by Neil MacKay In 2015, he appeared in the Scottish/Irish horror film Let Us Prey opposite Liam Cunningham and Pollyanna McIntosh.

In 2016, he appeared opposite Gerard Butler in London Has Fallen, in the role of SAS commander Will Davies. The film was directed by Babak Najafi and was released on 4 March by Millennium Films, under their recently revived Gramercy Pictures label.

In 2017, he was cast as the lead antagonist, Ernest Hunt, in the Hong Kong film Chasing the Dragon (Chinese: 追龍), previously known as King of Drug Dealers. It stars Donnie Yen and Andy Lau, and is directed by Jason Kwan and Wong Jing. Larkin is believed to have largely improvised many of his scenes. His overall performance was highly praised, arguably because Westerners rarely get so much screen time in Hong Kong films. This allowed him to portray more facets of Hunt's character. One reviewer claimed that his performance was "uneven"; Larkin stated: "No character ever is... That's dull.I wanted to show Hunt's sociopathic, and villainous side, both quietly and bombastically. Otherwise he would appear one dimensional".

His work as a motion-capture and voice artist includes AAA titles Horizon Zero Dawn, Blood & Truth, Killzone: Mercenary and Quantum Break.

Larkin also appeared in a co-starring role in Vixxena. Critics considered Larkin one of the few highlights in the movie. Larkin was also set to reprise his role as the SAS commander opposite Gerard Butler in Angel Has Fallen, but reportedly owing to story development the shooting script no longer featured his character.

He further appeared in the History Channel's sixth series of Vikings series as Wiglaf, a Saxon warrior who led the battle against Ivor the Boneless.

Larkin is also currently developing his own projects, namely the Dead End series, in which he plays a nameless assassin known as "The Contractor". Larkin has created, produced, written and co-directed the series. The central storyline follows Larkin's character across Asia, the United Kingdom and Los Angeles in his pursuit of the key players in a global human trafficking ring. The trilogy has been released at international film festivals and has collected more than 40 awards to date and received positive reviews for its acting, story and technical achievements.

in 2020, he was cast in The Point Men, formerly known by its working title of The Negotiation, opposite South Korean actors Hwang Jung-min and Hyun Bin, in the supporting role of Abdullah. The film received a theatrical release across South Korea from 18 January 2023.

in 2021, he was cast in Paramount Pictures' forthcoming Dungeons & Dragons: Honor Among Thieves, in the role of Chancellor Norixius. The film was scheduled for theatrical release on 3 March 2023.

In 2022, he returned to South Korea to commence shooting of Netflix series Narco-Saints opposite Park Hae-soo, Ha Jung-woo and Hwang Jung-min. It is co-written and directed by Yoon Jong-bin.

== Awards and nominations ==
Year	Nominated work	Award	Category	Result
2006	SCENE	BAFTA Scotland	Best First Time Performance	Won
2009	Running in Traffic	BAFTA Scotland New Talent Awards	Best Producer	Won
2009	Running in Traffic	Edinburgh International Film Festival	Trailblazer Award	Won

== Filmography ==
Year	Title	Role	Notes
2002	Just Around the Corner	Gareth	
2003	Taggart	Erwin Baxter	TV series
2003	Room for the Night	Ponce	
2003	Solid Air	Niall	
2004	Reflections of a Life	Alan	
2005	Miracle of Silence	Palsy man in Cafe	
2006	As far as you've come	Billy	
2006	SCENE.	Nathan/Gary/Actor	
2007	Rebus	Charlie Guthrie	TV series
2009	An Act of Terror	Colin Parker	
2009	Running in Traffic	Joe Cullen	
2009	Miles Away	Gill	
2009	The Red Machine	Robert Eldridge Dean	
2011	A Portentous Death	Husband	
2011	River City	Callum Duff	TV series
2011	Fast Romance	Doctor Gates	
2011	The Crews	Grassie	
2011	Young James Herriot	Detective	TV series
2012	Battleground	Mitch	
2012	Lip Service	Banker	TV series
2012	To Our Bright White Hearts	Bruce Callaghan	
2013	Outpost: Rise of the Spetsnaz	Dolokhov	
2013	Killzone: Mercenary	Voice of ISA Assault / Helghast	Video game
2013	Powerstar Golf	Voice of Henry	Video game
2014	Let Us Prey	PC Jack Warnock	
2014	Outlander	Geordie	TV series
2015	Doctors	Axel Hayley	TV series
2016	Shetland	Eddie	TV series
2016	London Has Fallen	Captain Will Davies	
2016	Quantum Break	Voice: Various	Video game
2017	I Am Vengeance	Marshall	
2017	Horizon Zero Dawn	Bajund, Jun, Kimik, Kudiv	Video game
2017	Chasing the Dragon	Ernest Hunt	
2020	Vikings	Wiglaf	TV series
2022	Narco-Saints	DEA Chief	TV series
2023	Dungeons & Dragons: Honor Among Thieves	Chancellor Norixius	
