= Mark Prendergast =

Scottish actor (active 1997– )

- Born: Stewarton, Ayrshire, Scotland
- Occupation: Actor

Mark Prendergast is a Scottish film, television and theatre actor. He is best known for his roles in BBC drama series Case Histories, US TV series Outlander and the BAFTA winning feature film Running in Traffic. On stage, Prendergast's most recent notable productions include the World Premiere of DC Jackson's The Marriage of Figaro for the Royal Lyceum Theatre, the Fringe First and CATS award-winning Slick by top Scottish theatre company Vox Motus.

== Early life ==
Prendergast was born in Stewarton, Ayrshire, Scotland, attending Stewarton Academy and then training professionally in acting at Langside College, Glasgow. Prendergast started performing from a very young age, taking an interest in magic at the age of 5. At 11 years old he became one of the youngest members at the time to join the Magic Circle, becoming a member of the Paisley, Scotland branch. This interest has continued in to his adult life and Prendergast has occasionally used magic for theatre productions he has been involved in and has designed illusions and effects for various theatre shows.

Prendergast also began singing at an early age, beginning training in classical voice under Frances Marshall. He would then at age 14 join the National Youth Choir of Scotland under chorus master Christopher Bell and, for a short time, the Royal Scottish National Orchestra Chorus. Whilst attending the National Youth Choir of Scotland from 1997 to 2002 Prendergast met and would go on to train with acclaimed singers and tutors, Stewart Kempster and tenor Peter Alexander Wilson.

Some of his very first acting roles were performed with the local theatre group The Dunlop Players. From here he would go on to play many leading roles in both the Palace Theatre Youth Theatre in Kilmarnock, Ayrshire and the Kilmarnock Amateur Operatics Society as well as gaining early acclaim performing at the Edinburgh Fringe Festival.

An only child, during his late teens/early twenties Prendergast spent periods of time in Shanghai, China where his parents lived and worked for 9 years.

== Career ==
Whilst training at Langside, Prendergast made his screen debut when he met Actor/Director/Writer Bryan Larkin and was cast in Larkin's directorial debut, 'Toy Gangsters'. This was the start of a professional relationship that led to them working together on many other film projects including the BAFTA award-winning 'Scene' and BAFTA award-winning Running in Traffic.

At the age of just 19, whilst still at Langside, Prendergast attended an open audition in London for the award-winning original production of Cameron Mackintosh/Royal Shakespeare Company's Les Misérables. After being successfully picked out from thousands of auditionees, Prendergast was offered a role and became one of the youngest members at the time to join the cast.

Since then, Prendergast has gone on to work in many critically acclaimed productions on screen and stage with companies including BBC, ITV, STV, The Comedy Unit, Adamant Productions, Sony Pictures, Starz Network, Sky, Shed Media, Dabhand Films, Tron Theatre, Royal Lyceum Theatre, Citizen's Theatre, Birmingham Stage Company, Theatre Royal Stratford East, Communicado, Vox Motus, Traverse Theatre and Scottish Opera.

== Theatre ==
Year	Title	Role	Theatre Company	Director
2010	The Government Inspector	Bobchinsky	Communicado	Gerry Mulgrew

Other theatre credits include Aladdin (King's Theatre), Othello (Citizens Theatre), ''Bette/Cavett (Tangerine Productions), Bliss/Mud, Mother Goose, Eating Beauty, Weans in the Wood, Wullie Whittington (Tron Theatre), Slick (Vox Motus), Richard III (Bard in the Botanics), Horrible Histories (Birmingham Stage Company), The Pillowman, Antigone, Death of a Salesman, and The Canterbury Tales (XLC Theatre Co).

== Filmography (actor) ==
- Miracle of Silence (2005)
- Running in Traffic (2009)
- /comedy (2010)
- Case Histories (2010)
- Garrow's Law (2011)
- Parkarma (2013)
- M.I.High (2013)
- Outpost: Rise of the Spetsnaz (2013)
- Trying Again (2014)
- Rab C. Nesbitt (2014)
- Outlander (2015)
- Two Doors Down (2023)

Other film and television credits include Tommy and The Weeks (BBC/Comedy Unit), Jacko & Dandy Boy Muckers (Dabhand), A Mental Love Story (Discreet Productions), Consequence (Adamant Productions), The Paranioa Show (Channel 4/Comedy Unit), and Asian Overground (BBC/Neon).
