= COVID-19 vaccine hesitancy in the United States =

Reluctance by those living in the USA to be vaccinated with a COVID-19 vaccine

After the December 2020 introduction of COVID vaccines, a partisan gap in death rates developed, indicating the effects of vaccine skepticism. As of March 2024, more than 30 percent of Republicans had not received a Covid vaccine, compared with less than 10 percent of Democrats.

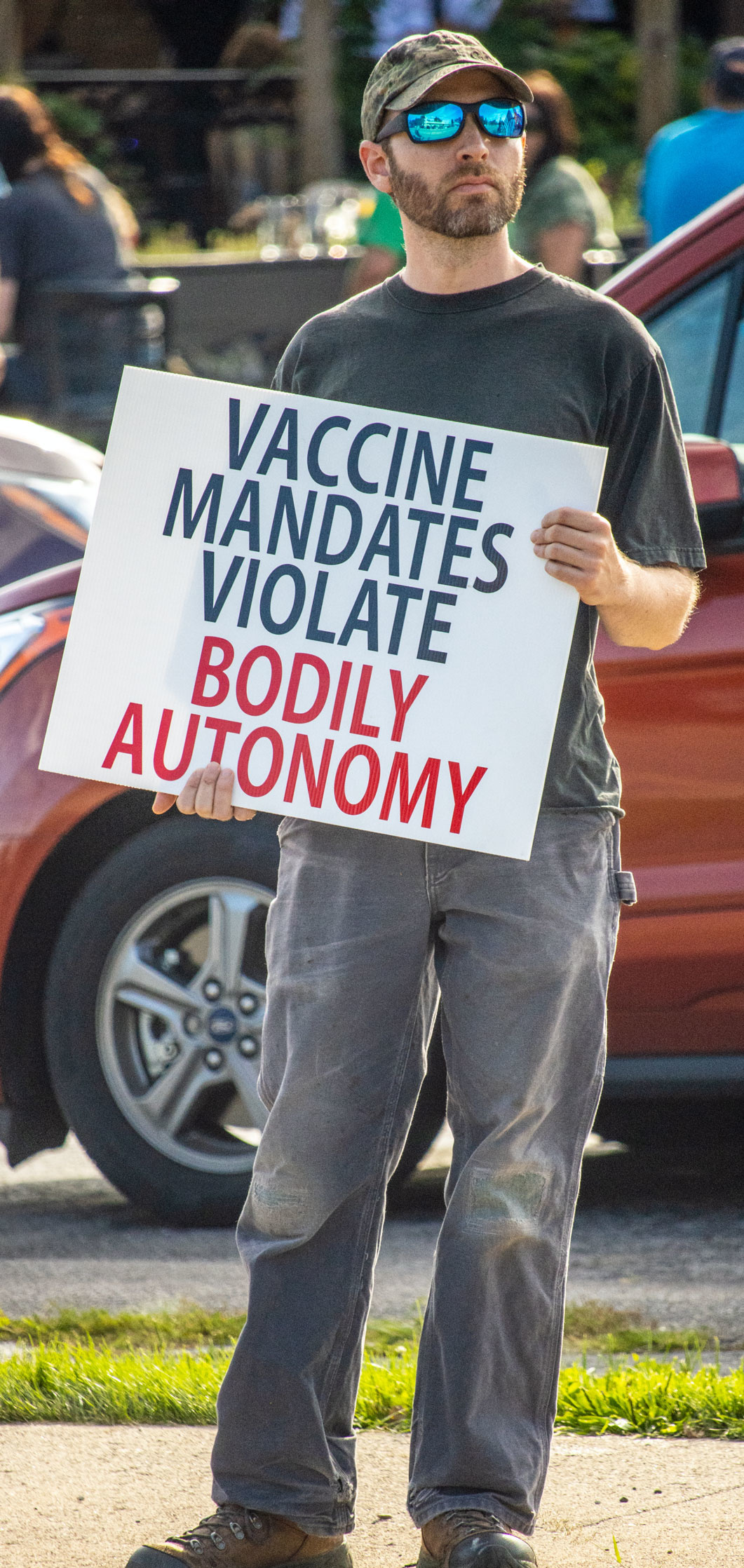
Anti vaccine protester - Worthington, Ohio - August 14, 2021

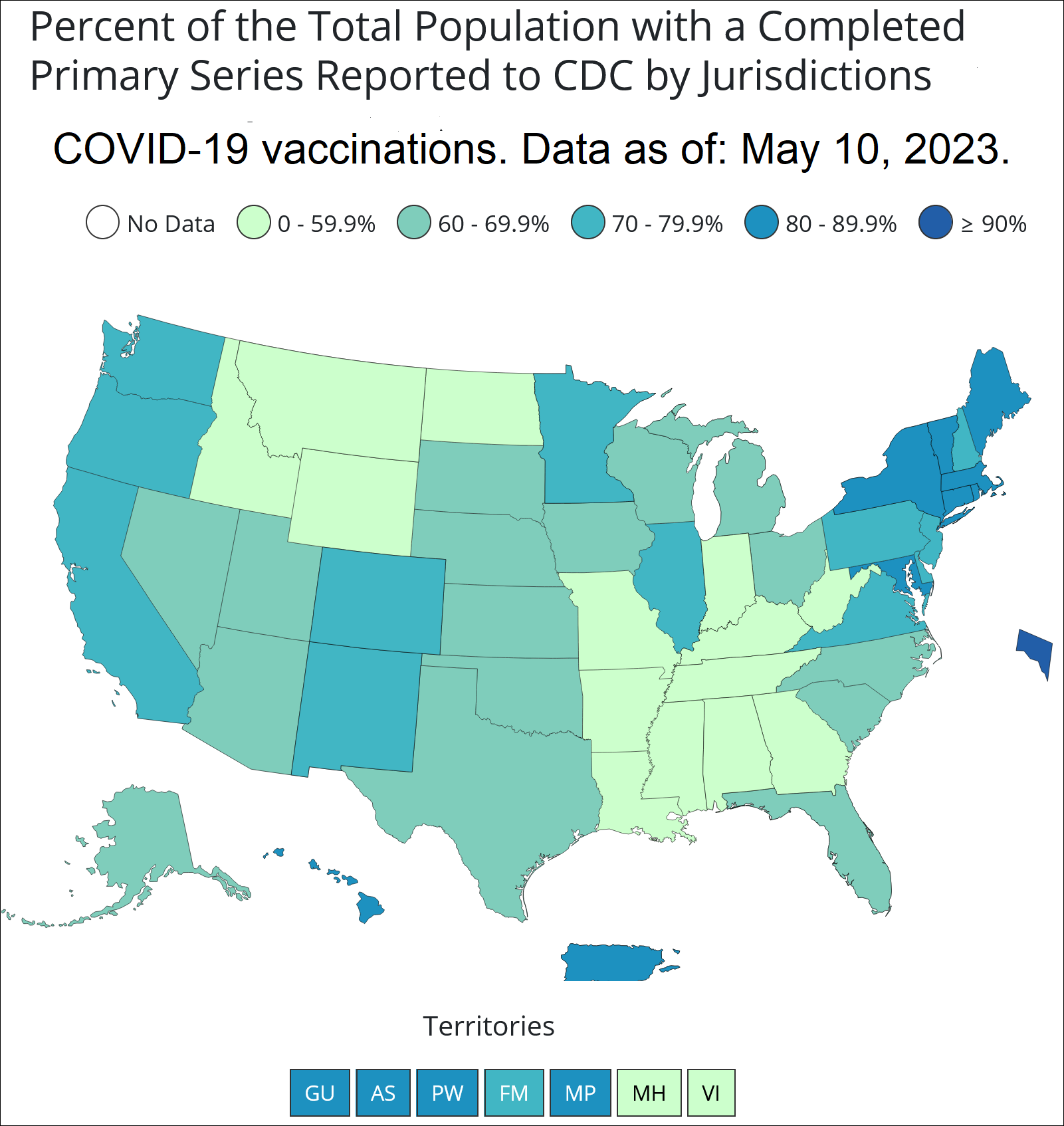
Percent of people of all ages who received all doses prescribed by the initial COVID-19 vaccination protocol. Two of the three COVID-19 vaccines used in the U.S. require two shots to be fully vaccinated. The other vaccine requires only one shot. Booster doses are recommended too. See Commons source for date of last upload.

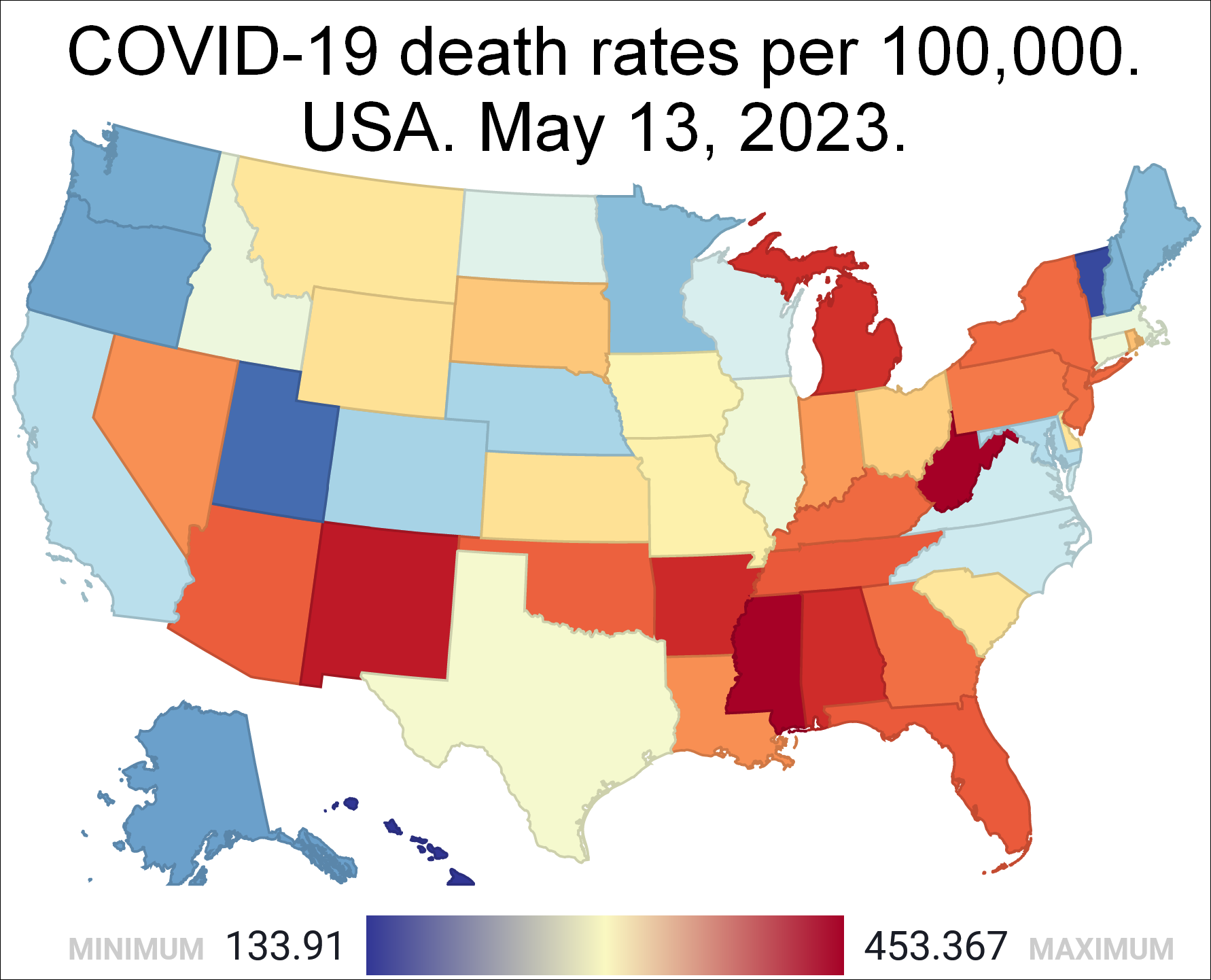
Map of cumulative COVID-19 death rates by US state.

COVID-19 vaccine hesitancy in the United States is the sociocultural phenomenon of individuals refusing or displaying hesitance towards receiving the COVID-19 vaccine. COVID-19 vaccine hesitancy in the United States can be considered as part of the broader history of vaccine hesitancy.

== History ==
Vaccine hesitancy in the United States towards the COVID-19 vaccines has existed since the early stages of the vaccines' development. COVID-19 vaccine-hesitant people are not necessarily anti-vaccine.

Soon after the start of the COVID-19 pandemic, preexisting anti-vaxxer social networks started online and in-person campaigns to discredit the developing COVID-19 vaccines targeting United States citizens. Anti-vaccination influencers used Twitter and other social media platforms to spread vaccine misinformation. Some in the medical field have given false credibility to vaccine hesitant beliefs. This caused the Federation of State Medical Boards to issue a statement in July 2021 that any physicians who generate and spread vaccine misinformation or disinformation would risk disciplinary action.

White House sources revealed in March 2021 that Trump and his wife, Melania, had secretly received the COVID-19 vaccine in January. In April 2021, Trump referred to the COVID-19 vaccine as a "true miracle" and encouraged his supporters to take it. In September 2021, Trump revealed to journalist Adam Shapiro that he received the Pfizer version of the vaccine and encouraged the general public to take the vaccine. In the same interview, Trump blamed president Biden for the public's lack of trust in the vaccine: "When I was president, everybody wanted to get the vaccine... after I left, people don't want to take it and... I think it's because they don't trust Biden." In December 2021, Trump called the vaccine "one of the greatest achievements of mankind"; commentators on MSNBC's Morning Joe called his statements politically motivated, with Al Sharpton comparing Trump's dishonest walking back of support for fringe views to moonwalking.

Ipsos polling data shows that vaccine hesitancy dropped from 63% in September 2020 to 20% in September 2021. The change was accompanied by COVID-19 fatigue, the Delta variant surge, and the FDA's formal approval of the Pfizer vaccine.

=== Anti-vaccine public figures who died from COVID-19 ===
Many news reports in 2021 noted when vaccine opponents died from COVID-19, though some criticized the practice as celebrating the suffering of others.

In August 2021, a number of conservative talk radio hosts who had discouraged COVID-19 vaccination, or expressed skepticism toward the COVID-19 vaccine, died from COVID-19 complications. These included Marc Bernier (self-nicknamed "Mr. Antivax") from Daytona, Florida; Dick Farrel, an anti-vaccine activist who referred to the pandemic as a "SCAM DEMIC"; Jimmy DeYoung Sr.; and Phil Valentine. In September 2021, another anti-vaccine conservative radio host, Bob Enyart, died of COVID-19. In November 2021, Marcus Lamb, an American televangelist and co-founder of the Daystar Television Network, who promoted skepticism toward all vaccines, died of COVID-19. Anti-vaccine podcaster Doug Kuzma fell ill shortly after attending the right-wing conference "ReAwaken America" in December 2021, and died of COVID-19 the following month.

In August 2021, Caleb Wallace, a Texas advocate against mask and vaccine mandates, died of COVID-19.

Kelly Ernby, a 46-year old deputy district attorney in Orange County, California who was also a California state assembly candidate and a critic of vaccine mandates, died January 2022, of COVID-19; she was not vaccinated. Kelly Canon, an anti-vaccine activist in Arlington, Texas, also died of COVID-19 in January 2022. Washington state trooper Robert LeMay was fired in October 2021, after refusing to be vaccinated despite a state mandate. He explained his position in a video that became popular online, and he died of COVID-19 in January 2022.

== Reasons ==
The reasons for hesitancy towards COVID-19 vaccine are complex and vary between individuals, including concerns about side effects of the vaccination, wanting to wait to see if the vaccine is safe, and believing misinformation about COVID-19 vaccines promulgated by conspiracy theories, including but not limited to incorrect beliefs that vaccines contain microchips from Bill Gates to track and control people, intentional side effects, infertility, and permanent genetic alteration. Claims that a previous exposure to the virus gives a superior natural immunity versus the vaccine have been scientifically dismissed. Additional reasons for COVID-19 vaccine hesitancy include fears about long-term health risks of vaccination, belief in the strength of the body's "natural immune system" to fight infections without any vaccine, mistrust in government, and mistrust in mainstream medicine and institutions. Local politics, including gubernatorial edicts against vaccine mandates as in Texas, also play a role in shaping public opinion.

African Americans are more likely to be unvaccinated due to institutional mistrust.

== Legal ==
There have been many lawsuits seen throughout the United States aimed against the vaccine mandates that were implemented in 2021. Two Staff Sergeants, one from the Army the other from the Marines, sued three federal agencies against their plans to conduct mandatory vaccination of all military troops, as military regulations state that troops can be exempted from vaccination showing documented previous infection. After the announcement of President Joe Biden of a country wide vaccine mandate in September 2021, many organizations and politicians such as the Republican National Committee, South Dakota Governor Kristi Noem, and Arizona Attorney General Mark Brnovich stated they would sue the administration.

Generally litigation for vaccine injury claims against manufacturers are filed with the United States Court of Federal Claims, sitting without a jury and compensation is provided by the National Vaccine Injury Compensation Program. The Public Readiness and Emergency Preparedness Act (PREP Act) was invoked for Medical Countermeasures Against COVID-19 on March 17, 2020. Under the PREP Act the HHS secretary provides legal protection to manufacturers of vaccines and treatments, unless there's willful misconduct, barring liability cases from vaccine injury despite low payout rates from the National Vaccine Injury Compensation Program.

== By profession ==
=== Medical professionals ===
Survey research of medical professionals in the United States shows a large majority of the American medical community accepts and trusts the COVID-19 vaccines. Medical professionals in the United States are vaccinated at a higher rate than the general public they serve. For example, in August 2021 in Alabama, it was estimated 50-60% of hospital staff were vaccinated compared to a <35% vaccination rate for the total state population. Regional vaccination rate in health care professionals parallels that of the local community, where states with higher vaccination rates have higher instances of vaccinated health care workers. In July 2021, the Mayo Clinic, a nonprofit American academic medical center with over 60,000 employees, announced they would require staff to get vaccinated.

In 2021, a group of physicians, parents, and disability advocates united to establish the non-profit organization No License for Disinformation (NLFD). Formed by clinically practicing physicians whose patient care was significantly impacted by patients holding false beliefs, the group aimed to address the spread of medical misinformation. These doctors revealed that their patients were repeating medical misinformation, using phrases commonly employed by leading politically affiliated doctors associated with the 2020 Donald Trump Presidential reelection campaign. On September 21, 2021, the authors and founders of NLFD made their announcement in the Washington Post. They highlighted the detrimental effects of Trump’s doctors and urged the State Medical Boards to take action to halt this widespread misinformation campaign.

=== Military ===
==== Active duty and reserve forces ====
From December 2020 through March 2021, 361,538 service members, or 27.2 percent of the active-duty military, received at least one dose of the COVID-19 vaccine. As of August 2021, over 1,000,000 active-duty and reserve forces were at least partially vaccinated. Throughout the Coronavirus pandemic, vaccination rates have varied between the branches of the United States Armed Forces from the 74% rate in the Navy to the closer to 50% rate in the Army. On August 25, 2021, Defense Secretary Lloyd Austin, ordered mandatory vaccinations for most of the country's active duty and reserve forces, directing each branch "to impose ambitious timelines for implementation and to report regularly on vaccination completion using established systems for other mandatory vaccine reporting." The US military will require service members to get the COVID-19 vaccine by September 15, 2021.

In response to the vaccine mandate, an Army staff sergeant and a Marine staff sergeant sued various federal government agencies to grant exemptions on mandatory COVID vaccinations for those who've had the virus. As of September 2021, a judge did not grant a temporary block on mandatory vaccinations and the suit will continue through normal court procedures.

==== Veterans ====
In July 2021, the Department of Veterans Affairs mandated the COVID-19 vaccines for its more than 100,000 front-line workers, becoming the first federal agency to do so. The VA is working with the American Legion on COVID-19 vaccine hesitancy outreach. On August 28, 2021, during the national convention of the American Legion, speaker Carolyn Clancy, the VA's Assistant Under Secretary for Health, described COVID-19 as an unprecedented public health emergency and encouraged vaccinated veterans to reach out to their peers who are vaccine-hesitant. Clancy also described how 70 VA facilities were part of the vaccine trials during Operation Warp Speed, participation, she said, veterans should be "quite proud of."

As of July 1, 2021, of the 380,000 people who work for the Department of Veterans Affairs, 298,186 are fully vaccinated, or 78 percent, a percentage higher than the national average but below what VA officials want for those providing health care. As of July 1, 2021, 20,300 V.A. employees have contracted the coronavirus since March 2020. In late July 2021, Department of Veterans Affairs Secretary Denis McDonough released a press release announcing he will make COVID-19 vaccines mandatory for Title 38 VA health care personnel.

=== Professional athletes ===
In Spring 2021, as vaccines became available to professional athletes, several professional leagues encountered substantial vaccine hesitancy among players. In August 2021 the Atlanta Falcons, a football team from the National Football League (NFL) located in Atlanta, Georgia, became the first NFL team to report being fully vaccinated. The NFL's then-most recent MVP Aaron Rodgers was one of football's most prominent players to speak out against the vaccines and the league's protocols. He was subsequently fined by the league for failing to wear a mask during interviews with the media.

In July 2021, the National Basketball Association (NBA) announced that 90% of NBA players were vaccinated. Kyrie Irving refused vaccination and was barred from participating. In June 2021, Major League Baseball (MLB) announced that two-thirds of the MLB teams had reached 85% vaccination rate. Upon the start of the 2021–2022 National Hockey League (NHL) season, the league announced that over 99% of NHL players were vaccinated. Tyler Bertuzzi was the only player who had remained unvaccinated.

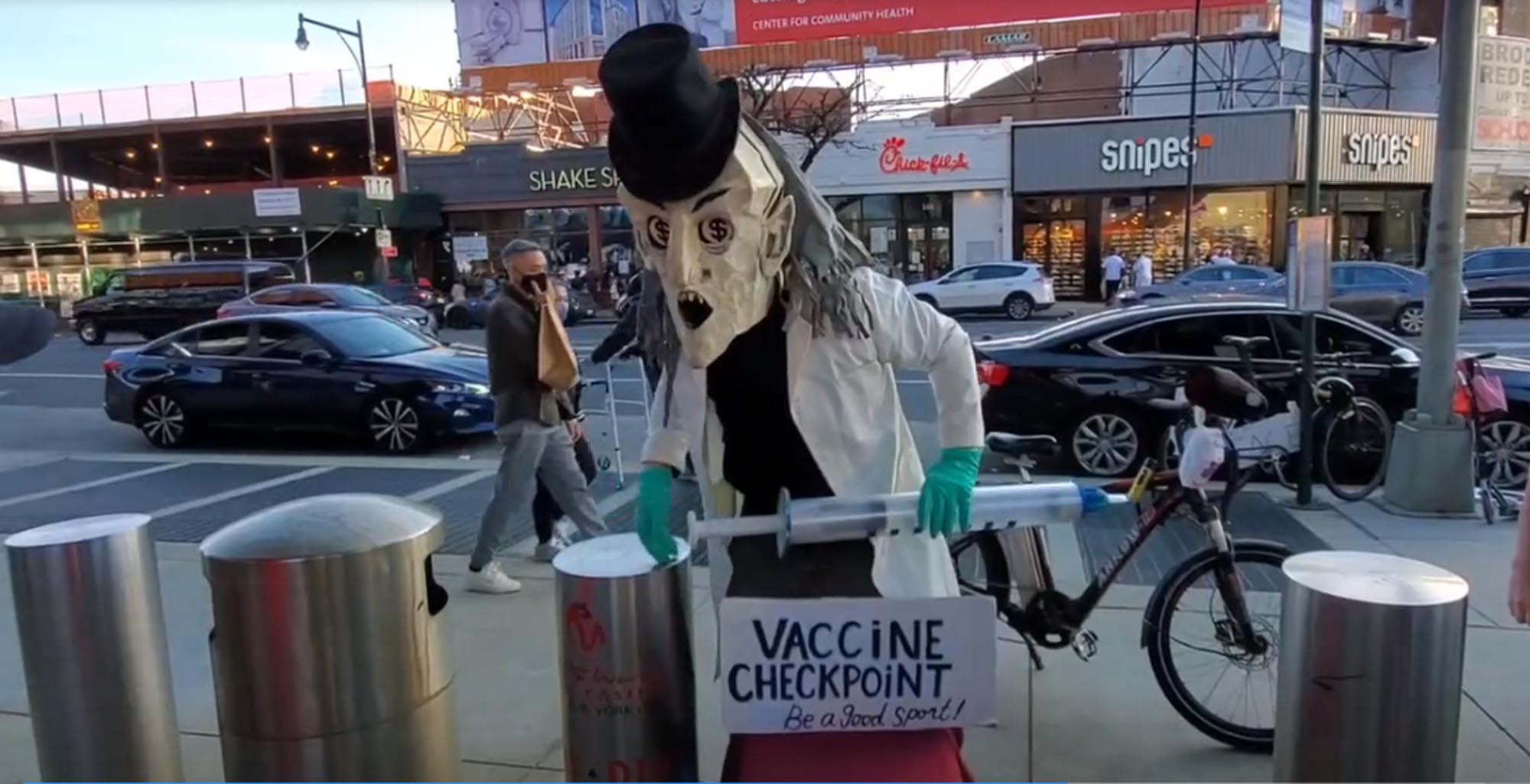
Vaccine Protest at Barclay's Center, Brooklyn, NYC - 2021

=== Federal employees ===
In July 2021, the state of California and the city of New York announced a requirement for state employees to either get vaccinated or face weekly testing. As of July 2021, the Biden administration seeks to increase the vaccination rate of federal employees. As part of this vaccination effort, the administration required all contractors working for the federal government to get vaccinated or submit to regular testing and masking.

As of 2025, the Trump administration is looking to remove covid-19 vaccination data from federal employees' personnel documents, eliminating instances of non-compliance with vaccine mandates and requests for exemptions from any mandates.
