= Dee Reynolds =

Sitcom character

Deandra "Dee" Reynolds
- It's Always Sunny in Philadelphia character
- First appearance: "The Gang Gets Racist" (2005)
- Created by: Charlie Day; Glenn Howerton; Rob McElhenney
- Portrayed by: Kaitlin Olson

In-universe information
- Alias: Susie
- Gender: Female
- Occupation: Bartender at Paddy's Pub
- Family: Bruce Mathis (biological father); Barbara Reynolds (mother); Dennis Reynolds (twin brother); Frank Reynolds (legal father); Heinrich "Pop-Pop" Landgraf (maternal grandfather); Gail the Snail (cousin)
- Alma Mater: University of Philadelphia

Deandra "Dee" Reynolds (also known as Sweet Dee) is a fictional character and one of the five main characters on the American sitcom It's Always Sunny in Philadelphia. Portrayed by Kaitlin Olson, the character debuted in the pilot episode "The Gang Gets Racist". Dee is a bartender at Paddy's Pub alongside Mac and Charlie, the fraternal twin sister of Dennis, and supposed daughter of Frank. Together, the group are often collectively known as the "Gang".

Throughout the series, Dee is often the "punching bag" of the group, and referred to as a "bird". She is just as cruel as the rest of the gang, although initially was more of a level-headed person.

== Creation and development ==
The character of Sweet Dee was created as the "straight man" of the group, being a more level-headed presence to the gang's shenanigans. In the pilot episode Dee was initially portrayed by Jordan Reid, who was the current girlfriend of Rob McElhenney, one of the show's main stars and creators. Due to the pair breaking up, Reid was no longer set to portray Dee in the now greenlit show.

Olson was brought on to the show, but she only accepted the role after discussing with McElhenney that the character could evolve to be funnier as the show progressed. Kristen Wiig also auditioned for the role.

== Character development ==
=== Background ===
Deandra and her twin brother Dennis Reynolds were born to Barbara Reynolds and led a rich, entitled life believing Frank Reynolds was their father. The actual father of the twins was revealed to be philanthropist Bruce Mathis. Dee often faced abuse from her mother, causing her to resent her later in life.

During school, Dee wore a back brace due to her scoliosis and was often bullied for the fact, being known as the Aluminium Monster. She attended physical therapy, where she met Matthew Mara, the man known to the gang as Rickety Cricket. She was initially a sweet, good-natured person, but an accident shown in the episode "The Gang Buys a Roller Rink" made her the crude, morally bankrupt person shown in the show. Dee and Dennis both pursued psychology majors at the University of Pennsylvania.

Dee aspired to be an actress and comedian, but has no real creative talent or stage presence, often resorting to racist stereotypes and having negative reactions to being on stage, including dry heaving.

=== During the series ===
Dee is a bartender at Paddy's Pub, alongside the rest of the gang. She is often the punching bag of the group, often referred to as a "bird" due to her supposedly unattractive, bird-like features.

She finds out throughout the series that her grandfather was a Nazi officer, and that her real father is Bruce Mathis. Barbara Reynolds dies in season three and leaves Dee nothing, while leaving Dennis her home and the majority of her wealth.

She often manipulates Matthew Mara, whose unrelenting crush on Dee causes him to leave the priesthood, a choice which would later leave him homeless, destitute, and in poor physical health.

== Reception ==
The character of Dee Reynolds has been positively received, with Olson's comedic timing and performance considered a high point of the series.

Certain episodes with the character donning blackface have proved controversial.
