= Kaitlin Olson =

American actress and comedian (born 1975)

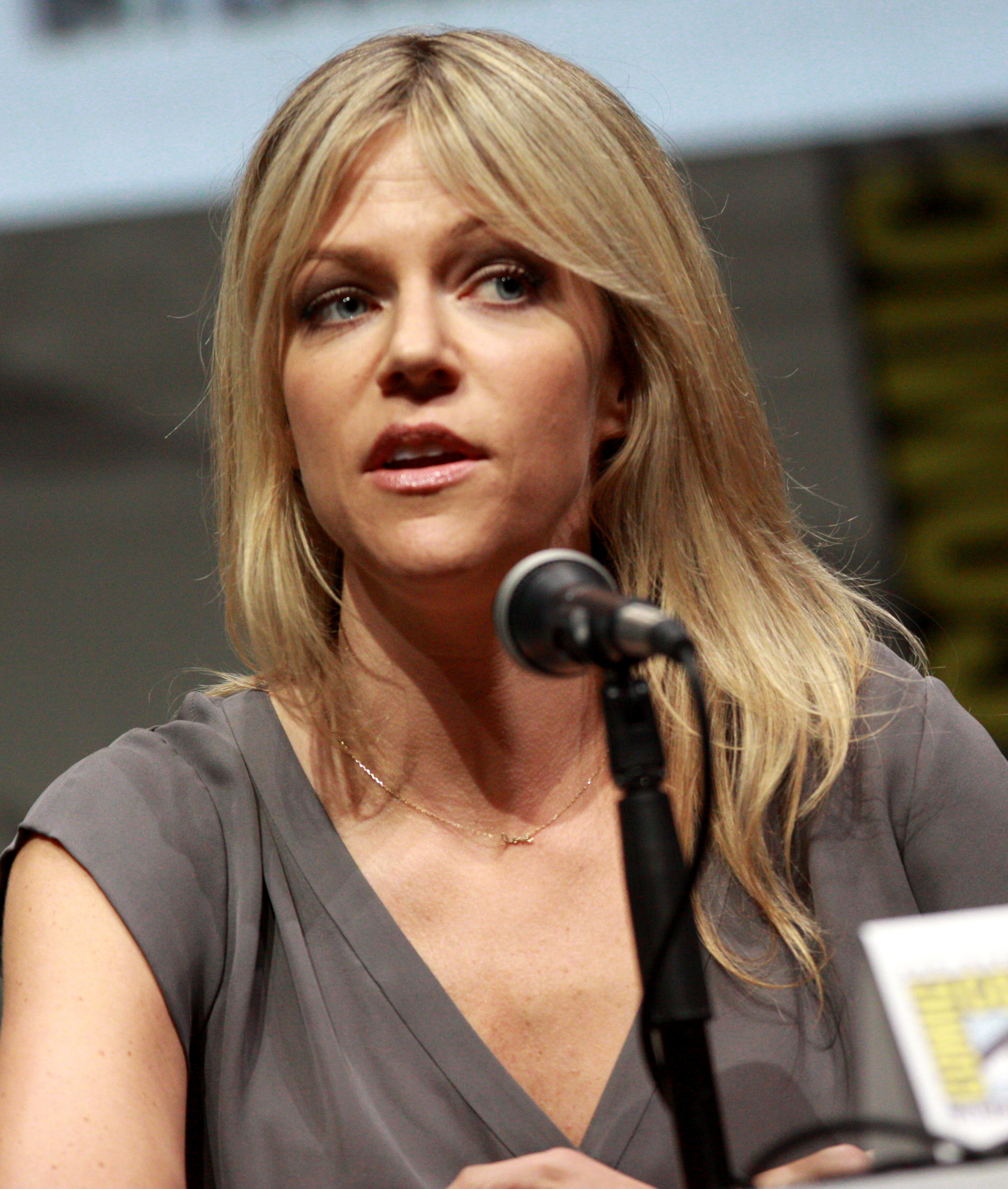
- Olson at the 2013 San Diego Comic-Con
- Born: Kaitlin Willow Olson; August 18, 1975 (age 51); Portland, Oregon, U.S.
- Education: University of Oregon
- Occupations: Actress; comedian
- Years active: 2000–present
- Spouse: Rob McElhenney (m. 2008)
- Children: 2

Kaitlin Willow Olson McElhenney (born August 18, 1975) is an American actress and comedian. She is best known for her roles as Deandra "Sweet Dee" Reynolds in the FX/FXX comedy series It's Always Sunny in Philadelphia (since 2005) and Morgan Gillory in the ABC crime comedy drama series High Potential (since 2024).

Also on television, she has portrayed recurring characters such as Becky in the HBO sitcom Curb Your Enthusiasm (2000–2020) and Deborah "DJ" Vance Jr. in the HBO Max comedy-drama series Hacks (2021–2026). She played Mackenzie "Mickey" Molng, the lead role in the Fox comedy series The Mick (2017–2018). She has appeared in several comedy films, including Leap Year (2010), The Heat (2013), Finding Dory (2016), and Champions (2023).

Olson received her first Primetime Emmy Award nomination for her role as Cricket Melfi in the Quibi comedy series Flipped (2020), in the category of Outstanding Actress in a Short Form Comedy or Drama Series. She went on to receive three more Emmy nominations for Outstanding Guest Actress in a Comedy Series in 2022, 2024 and 2026 for her role in Hacks.

== Early life ==
Olson was born in Portland, Oregon, on August 18, 1975, to Donald Lee Olson, a publisher, and Melinda Leora, a nurse and the CEO of Earth Mama Angel Baby organics. Shortly after she was born, Olson's family moved to Spokane, Washington, then to Vashon Island, Washington, in Puget Sound. Olson lived there until she was eight. Her family went back to the Portland area, settling in Tualatin, where she grew up on a farm. Her father worked as the publisher of the Portland Tribune from 2000 to 2001.

At age 12, Olson was in a serious bicycle accident involving a vehicle, resulting in a fractured skull requiring reconstructive surgery. She graduated from Tigard High School in Tigard, Oregon, in 1993. She studied theater at the University of Oregon, graduating with a bachelor's degree in theater arts in 1997. After college, she moved to Los Angeles to pursue acting professionally.

== Career ==
After moving to Los Angeles, Olson became a member of theater comedy troupe The Groundlings Sunday Company. She trained with Sunday Company for a year, which led to her receiving a recurring role on Curb Your Enthusiasm.

In 2000, Olson made her debut television appearance in the HBO comedy series Curb Your Enthusiasm as Becky, Cheryl Hines's character's sister. The same year as her television debut, Olson also had a minor role in the film Coyote Ugly. She received more regular work after being cast on The Drew Carey Show (1995–2004). Carey would end up working closely with Olson, stating he knew she was "headed for stardom." He later cast Olson in the Green Screen Show (2004–2005). She also toured Bosnia, Kosovo, and Norway with Carey and several other comedians, providing entertainment for U.S. military troops through the USO.

She went on to make guest appearances in several television series, including Punk'd in 2003, Miss Match in 2003, George Lopez in 2004, and Out of Practice in 2006.

Olson received wider recognition when she was cast as Deandra "Sweet Dee" Reynolds in the FX sitcom It's Always Sunny in Philadelphia (since 2005), one of the then-four (later five) main characters on the series. She garnered critical acclaim for her performance, with particular praise for her physical comedy.

In 2007, Olson played a recurring role as Hartley Underwood, the "one-armed" neighbor in the FX drama series The Riches. She had voice roles in numerous animated series, including Family Guy (2009–2011), Brickleberry (2012), Bob's Burgers (2015–2019), and The Simpsons (2016). She also had roles in the comedy film Weather Girl (2009), the romantic comedy film Leap Year (2010), and the animated film Escape from Planet Earth (2013). In the action comedy film The Heat (2013), Olson appeared as a Bulgarian drug addict who engages in an exchange of cultural perspectives (and insults) with Melissa McCarthy's character. She also appeared as an Arizona cop in the road comedy film Vacation (2015).

In 2016, Olson provided the voice of Destiny, a near-sighted whale shark, in Disney's animated sequel film Finding Dory. Olson then starred as Mackenzie "Mickey" Molng in the Fox sitcom The Mick, which premiered in January 2017. She also served as an executive producer for the series. The second season of The Mick premiered in September 2017. Fox canceled the series after the season ended in April 2018.

Olson appeared in the dark comedy thriller film Arizona (2018), and guest starred in the Netflix workplace comedy series Space Force (2020). She also starred as Cricket Melfi in the Quibi comedy series Flipped (2020), which earned her a nomination for the Primetime Emmy Award for Outstanding Actress in a Short Form Comedy or Drama Series. Olson has guest starred as Deborah "DJ" Vance Jr. in the HBO Max comedy-drama series Hacks. For her performance in the series, she received three nominations for the Primetime Emmy Award for Outstanding Guest Actress in a Comedy Series, in 2022, 2024, and 2026. She had a voice role in the Netflix animated series Agent Elvis and starred in the sports comedy-drama film Champions. The next year, she appeared in the teen comedy film Incoming.

Olson took the leading-star role as the character Morgan Gillory in the ABC crime drama series High Potential in 2024, a remake of the French-Belgian series HPI. She also guest starred as her It's Always Sunny character, Deandra "Sweet Dee" Reynolds, in the ABC sitcom Abbott Elementary during a cross-over event in 2025.

== Personal life ==
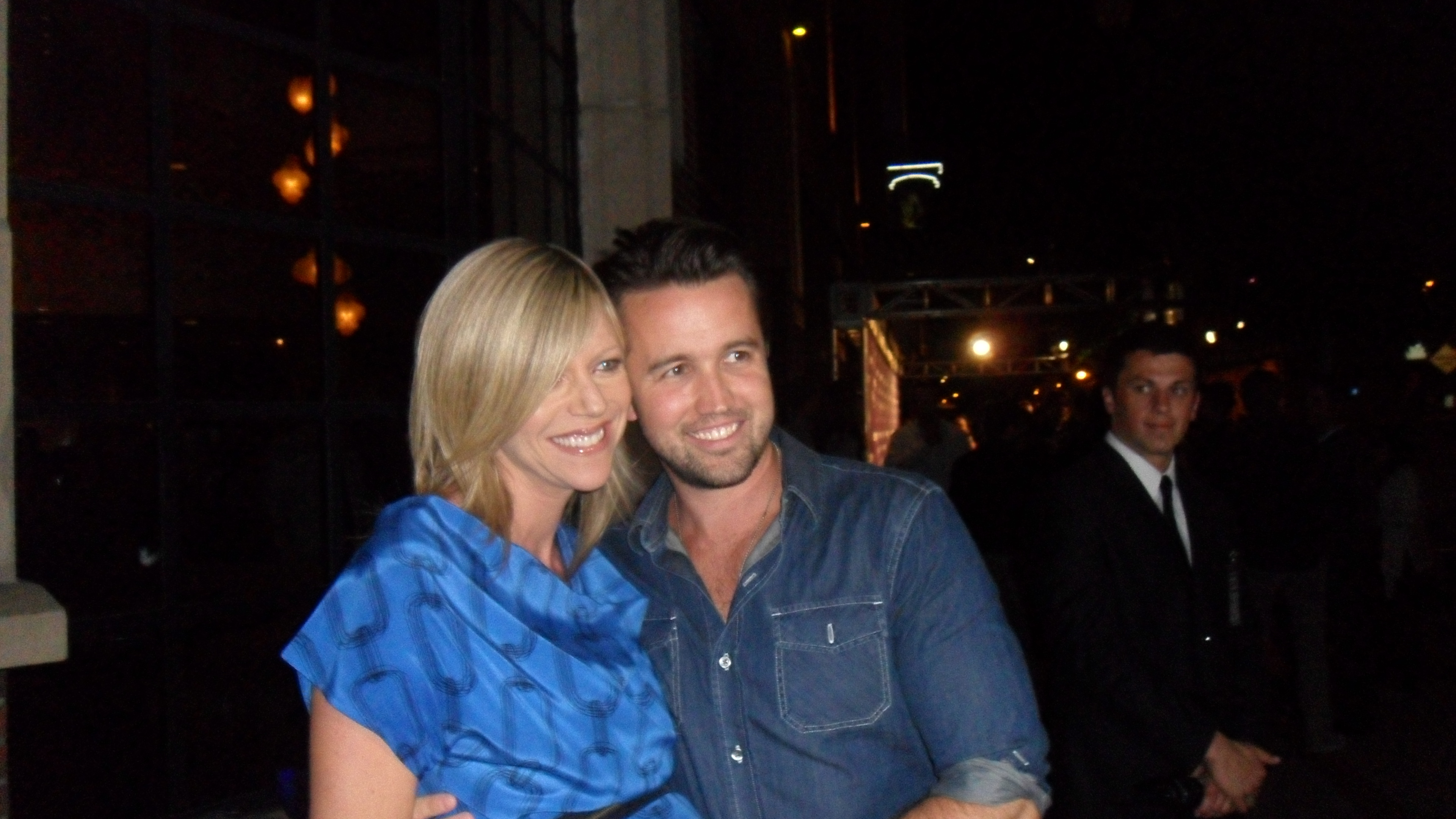
Olson with husband Rob McElhenney, 2010

Olson married her It's Always Sunny in Philadelphia co-star, Rob McElhenney, in Malibu, California, on September 27, 2008.The couple secretly started dating during the second season of the series.

In 2009, McElhenney and Olson announced their purchase of Skinner's Bar in Philadelphia; it was renamed Mac's Tavern. In 2010, Olson went into labor at a Los Angeles Dodgers home game against the Philadelphia Phillies; their son was born in their California home as planned. Their second son was born in 2012. They have two dogs, a cat, and a gerbil.

In June 2016, the Human Rights Campaign (HRC) released a video in tribute to the victims of the Orlando nightclub shooting; in the video, Olson and others narrated the stories of the people killed there.

== Filmography ==
=== Film ===
Year	Title	Role	Notes
2000	Eyes to Heaven	Unknown	
2000	Jacks	Jocelyn	
2000	Coyote Ugly	Bidding Customer	
2001	Fugly	Cha Cha	Short film
2003	Scapegoats	Jeannie	Short film
2009	Weather Girl	Sherry	
2010	Leap Year	Libby	
2010	Held Up	Rocky II	
2012	Trading Up	Barbara Manzer	Short film
2013	Escape from Planet Earth	3D Movie Girl	Voice role
2013	The Heat	Tatiana	
2015	Vacation	Arizona Cop	
2016	Finding Dory	Destiny	Voice role
2018	Arizona	Vicki	
2022	It's a Wonderful Binge	Mayor Spengler	
2023	Champions	Alex	
2024	Incoming	Ms. Nielsen	

=== Television ===
Year	Title	Role	Notes
2000–2020	Curb Your Enthusiasm	Becky	7 episodes
2002–2004	The Drew Carey Show	Traylor	12 episodes
2002	Meet the Marks	Kaitlin Marks	Main role
2003	Punk'd	Field Agent	2 episodes
2003	Miss Match	Jillian	Episode: "Who's Sari Now?"
2003	The Man Show	Crazy Hot Girl in the Bar	Season 5, Episode 20
2004	Significant Others	Lauren	Episode: "The First Time"
2004	George Lopez	Janet	Episode: "Home Sweet Homeschool"
2005	Kelsey Grammer Presents: The Sketch Show	Various roles	6 episodes; also writer
2005–present	It's Always Sunny in Philadelphia	Deandra "Sweet Dee" Reynolds	Main role
2006	Out of Practice	Debbie	Episode: "Model Behavior"
2007	The Riches	Hartley Underwood	5 episodes
2011	Family Guy	Brenda Quagmire	Episode: "Screams of Silence: The Story of Brenda Q"; voice role
2012	Unsupervised	Carol / Danielle	7 episodes; voice role
2012	Brickleberry	Ethel Anderson	Main role; voice role
2014–2015	New Girl	Ashley	2 episodes
2015–2019	Bob's Burgers	Helen	2 episodes; voice role
2016	Cassius & Clay	Ordwood Cassius	Unsold pilot; voice role
2016	The Simpsons	Quinn	Episode: "The Girl Code"; voice role
2017–2018	The Mick	Mackenzie "Mickey" Molng	Main role; also executive producer
2018	Mean Jean	Birdie	Unsold pilot
2020	Flipped	Cricket Melfi	Main role
2020	Who Wants to Be a Millionaire	Herself	Episode: "Dr. Phil, Kaitlin Olson & Lauren Lapkus"
2020	Space Force	Edison Jaymes	Episode: "Edison Jaymes"
2021–2026	Hacks	DJ Vance	Recurring role; 14 episodes
2023	Agent Elvis	CeCe Ryder	Main role; voice role
2024–present	High Potential	Morgan Gillory	Main role; also producer
2025	Abbott Elementary	Deandra "Sweet Dee" Reynolds	Crossover episode: "Volunteers"

=== Video games ===
Year	Title	Role	Notes
2015	Disney Infinity 3.0	Destiny	Voice role

=== Web ===
Year	Title	Role	Notes
2022–2023	The Always Sunny Podcast	Herself	6 episodes

=== Music videos ===
Year	Artist	Title	Role	Notes
2021	Imagine Dragons	"Follow You"	Herself	Co-starring with Rob McElhenney

== Awards and nominations ==
Year	Award	Category	Work	Result	Ref.
2017	Kids' Choice Awards	#SQUAD	Finding Dory	Won	
2020	Primetime Emmy Awards	Outstanding Actress in a Short Form Comedy or Drama Series	Flipped	Nominated	
2021	Astra TV Awards	Best Supporting Actress in a Streaming Series, Comedy	Hacks	Nominated	
2022	Primetime Emmy Awards	Outstanding Guest Actress in a Comedy Series	Hacks	Nominated	
2024	Primetime Emmy Awards	Outstanding Guest Actress in a Comedy Series	Hacks	Nominated	
2024	Astra TV Awards	Best Guest Actress in a Comedy Series	Hacks	Nominated	
2024	Astra TV Awards	Best Actress in a Broadcast Network or Cable Comedy Series	It's Always Sunny in Philadelphia	Nominated	
2026	Critics' Choice Super Awards	Best Actress in an Action Series	High Potential	Won	
2026	Primetime Emmy Awards	Outstanding Guest Actress in a Comedy Series	Hacks	Nominated	
