= Rob McElhenney =

American actor, producer and screenwriter (born 1977)

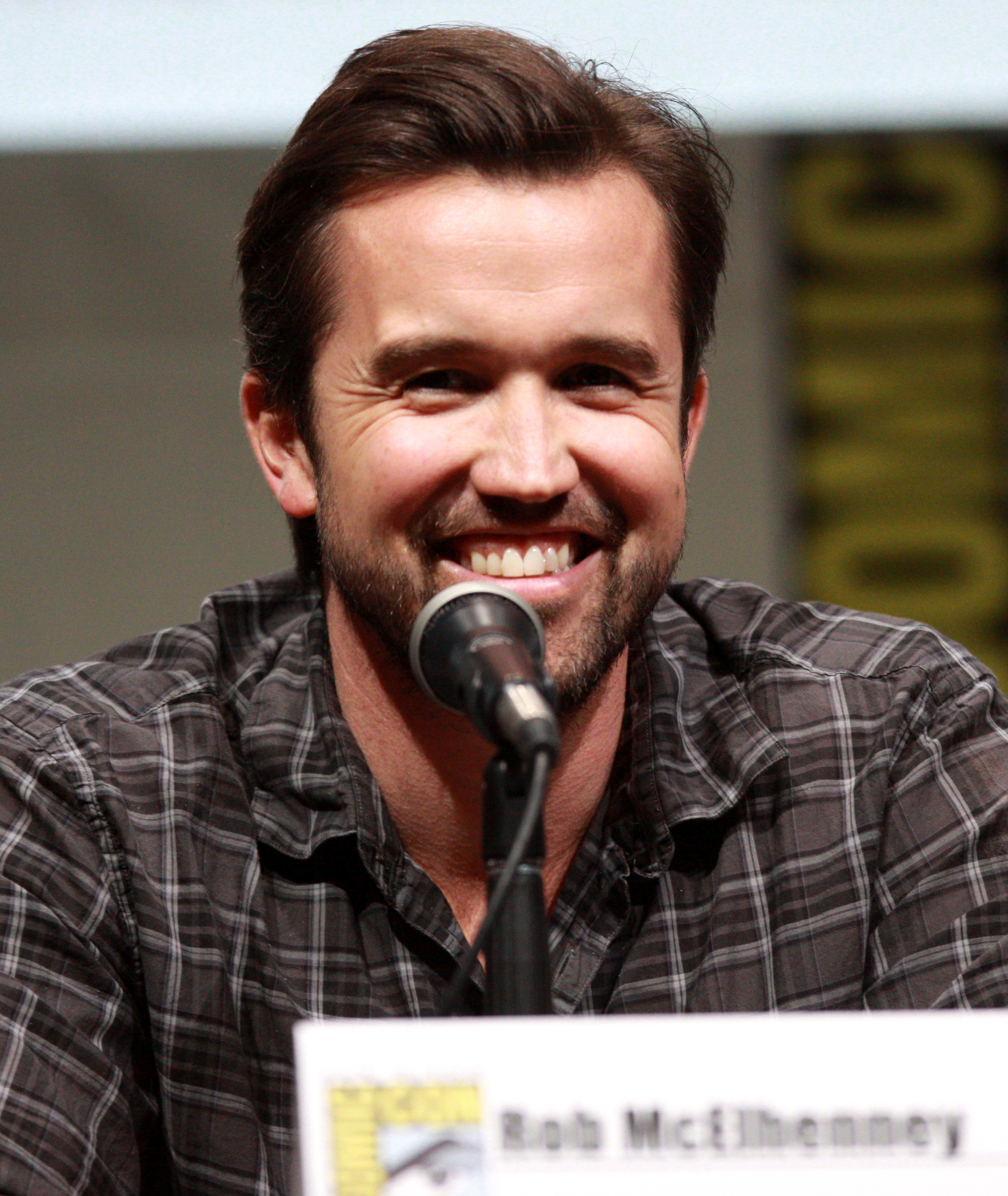
- McElhenney in 2013
- Born: Robert Dale McElhenney III; April 14, 1977 (age 49); Philadelphia, Pennsylvania, U.S.
- Other name: Rob Mac
- Education: Temple University (dropped out)
- Occupations: Actor; comedian; writer; producer; director; businessman
- Years active: 1996–present
- Spouse: Kaitlin Olson (m. 2008)
- Children: 2
- Relatives: Marcus McElhenney (cousin); Katie McElhenney (sister)

Robert Dale McElhenney III (/ˈmækəlhɛni/ MAK-əl-hen-ee; born April 14, 1977), also known professionally as Rob Mac, (Note: In June 2025, McElhenney filed to legally change his name to "Rob Mac". He has since been credited mainly as Rob Mac on television.) is an American actor, comedian, screenwriter, producer, director, and businessman. He is best known for his role as Mac on the FX/FXX comedy series It's Always Sunny in Philadelphia (2005–present), a show he created and co-developed with Charlie Day and Glenn Howerton and on which he continues to serve as an executive producer and writer. He is also known for playing Ian Grimm on the Apple TV+ comedy series Mythic Quest (2020–2025), which he co-created with Day and Megan Ganz as executive producers.

In September 2020, McElhenney became the co-owner of the Welsh football club Wrexham A.F.C. with Ryan Reynolds; this has been covered in the FX sports documentary series Welcome to Wrexham (2022–present), for which he won two Primetime Emmy Awards for Outstanding Unstructured Reality Program as one of the executive producers.

== Early life ==
Robert Dale McElhenney III was born in Philadelphia, Pennsylvania, on April 14, 1977. Both of McElhenney's parents were of Irish descent. He was raised Catholic. Through his father, he is a cousin of Olympic rower Marcus McElhenney. When he was eight years old, his parents divorced after his mother came out as a lesbian, though his parents remained close after the divorce. He has two full siblings: his sister, Katie McElhenney, and his brother, Patrick McElhenney, as well as a half-sister and half-brother through his father's subsequent marriage. His two brothers are gay, he was "partly raised by two women," and therefore describes himself as having "always been part of the gay community".

McElhenney attended Waldron Mercy Academy and St. Joseph's Preparatory School in Philadelphia. He later briefly attended Temple University and then temporarily lived on the Fordham University campus with friends, but chose not to enroll.

== Career ==
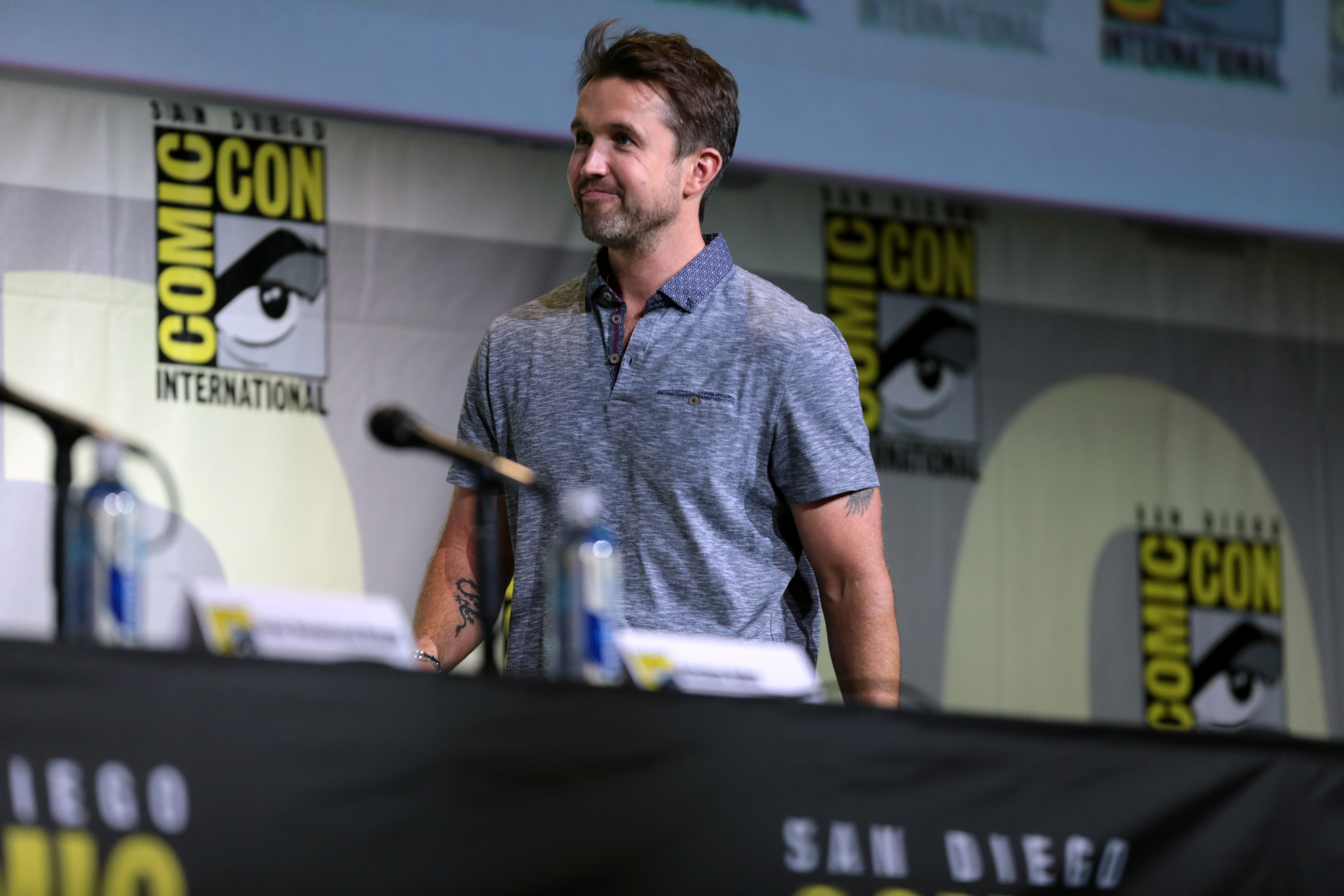
McElhenney in July 2016

McElhenney had his first major acting role with a small part in the 1997 film The Devil's Own, though his role was cut out of the final edit; the same thing eventually happened to him in Wonder Boys (2000). He followed this with small parts in the films A Civil Action (1998) and Thirteen Conversations About One Thing (2001). He later had more substantial parts in the films Latter Days (2003) and The Tollbooth (2004), and a guest role in the Law & Order episode "Thrill". When he was 21, a screenplay he wrote was optioned with Paul Schrader attached to direct, but the project fell through after a year of edits and rewrites.

Initially based in New York City, McElhenney moved to Los Angeles at the age of 25. When he was 27 years old, he was waiting tables between acting jobs and had met Glenn Howerton through his agent, as well as meeting Charlie Day while shooting a horror film in New York City. His idea for a sitcom starring himself, Howerton, and Day came from a suggestion originally made by one of his closest childhood friends. The pilot was filmed on a budget of $200 and pitched to various cable networks. After receiving offers from many of the networks, McElhenney chose to sign with FX/FXX, as they allowed him more creative freedom, and the show was eventually titled It's Always Sunny in Philadelphia. McElhenney was contracted as its showrunner, while both Howerton and Day were listed as executive producers. In December 2021, It's Always Sunny became the longest-running live-action American comedy of all time with the release of its 15th season. As of April 2026, the series is still ongoing, with its 18th season in the works.

McElhenney has said that 50 weeks per year are taken up by acting, producing, and writing for It's Always Sunny, though he did find time to appear in the Lost episode "Not in Portland". This was a result of him meeting Lost co-creator Damon Lindelof, who is a fan of It's Always Sunny. He later reprised his Lost role in another episode. He is a fan of Game of Thrones and said he was thrilled when the series' creators David Benioff and D.B. Weiss asked him if they could write an episode of It's Always Sunny. He and his co-producers accepted the offer, resulting in the episode "Flowers for Charlie" in 2013. In 2019, he had a cameo appearance as an extra in the Game of Thrones episode "Winterfell".

In July 2015, McElhenney was confirmed by Mojang as the director of the upcoming animated Minecraft movie, but he later left the project.

In 2017, McElhenney appeared in a guest role as a police officer in the acclaimed Fargo episode "The Law of Non-Contradiction". He received praise for his performance from critics, who saw many of his character's traits and plot points as references to It's Always Sunny.

In 2020, McElhenney co-created the Apple TV+ comedy series Mythic Quest alongside Charlie Day and Megan Ganz. He also stars as Ian Grimm on the show and serves as a writer and executive producer. The series has received critical acclaim, with the review aggregation website Rotten Tomatoes giving the series an 87% approval rating.

From November 2021 to July 2023, McElhenney, Day, and Howerton released The Always Sunny Podcast. The three discussed various topics, with the general framing of the podcast usually focusing on the creators discussing each episode of the show, sharing behind-the-scenes information, and describing what inspired the episodes. Cast members from the show also appeared to discuss their own characters and how they got into the show.

In 2025, McElhenney guest starred as his It's Always Sunny character in the ABC sitcom Abbott Elementary during a cross-over event.

== Business interests ==
In 2009, McElhenney and his wife Kaitlin Olson (who plays Dee on Its Always Sunny in Philadelphia) along with others purchased Skinner's Bar, now Mac's Tavern at 226 Market Street in Philadelphia.

The venue is closed as of late 2026, having operated for approximately 15 years before its shutdown.

On September 23, 2020, it was announced by the Wrexham Supporters Trust that a business partnership had been formed by McElhenney and Canadian actor Ryan Reynolds and that they were in talks to purchase the Welsh football team, Wrexham AFC. On November 16, 2020, it was confirmed that the two had successfully taken over the club after receiving the backing of the Wrexham Supporters Trust. On April 22, 2023, Wrexham achieved promotion to League Two and also became National League champions under their ownership. This marked a return for Wrexham to the English Football League (EFL) after a 15-year absence. On April 13, 2024, Wrexham secured promotion to League One, finishing 2nd in League Two and securing automatic league promotion. In May 2025, Wrexham secured promotion to the Championship, finishing 2nd in League One and securing automatic league promotion. In April 2024, some of Club Necaxa's owners purchased a 5% stake in Wrexham, reciprocated by Reynolds and McElhenney purchasing a minority ownership stake in Club Necaxa.

On June 7, 2022, McElhenney announced the launch of a new entertainment-tech company named Adim, co-founded by himself, Chase Rosenblatt, Melissa Kaspers, Spencer Marell, and Richard Rosenblatt.

In 2023, McElhenney and his It's Always Sunny co-stars Glenn Howerton and Charlie Day launched an Irish American Whiskey company to bottle the spirit of Paddy's Pub, named Four Walls, as a tribute to the four walls of the bar they call home on the show.

On June 26, 2023, it was announced that both Ryan Reynolds and McElhenney were part of an investor group that bought a 24% equity stake in the Alpine F1 Team.

In October 2024, McElhenney again joined Reynolds in purchasing a majority stake in Wrexham Lager.

== Personal life ==
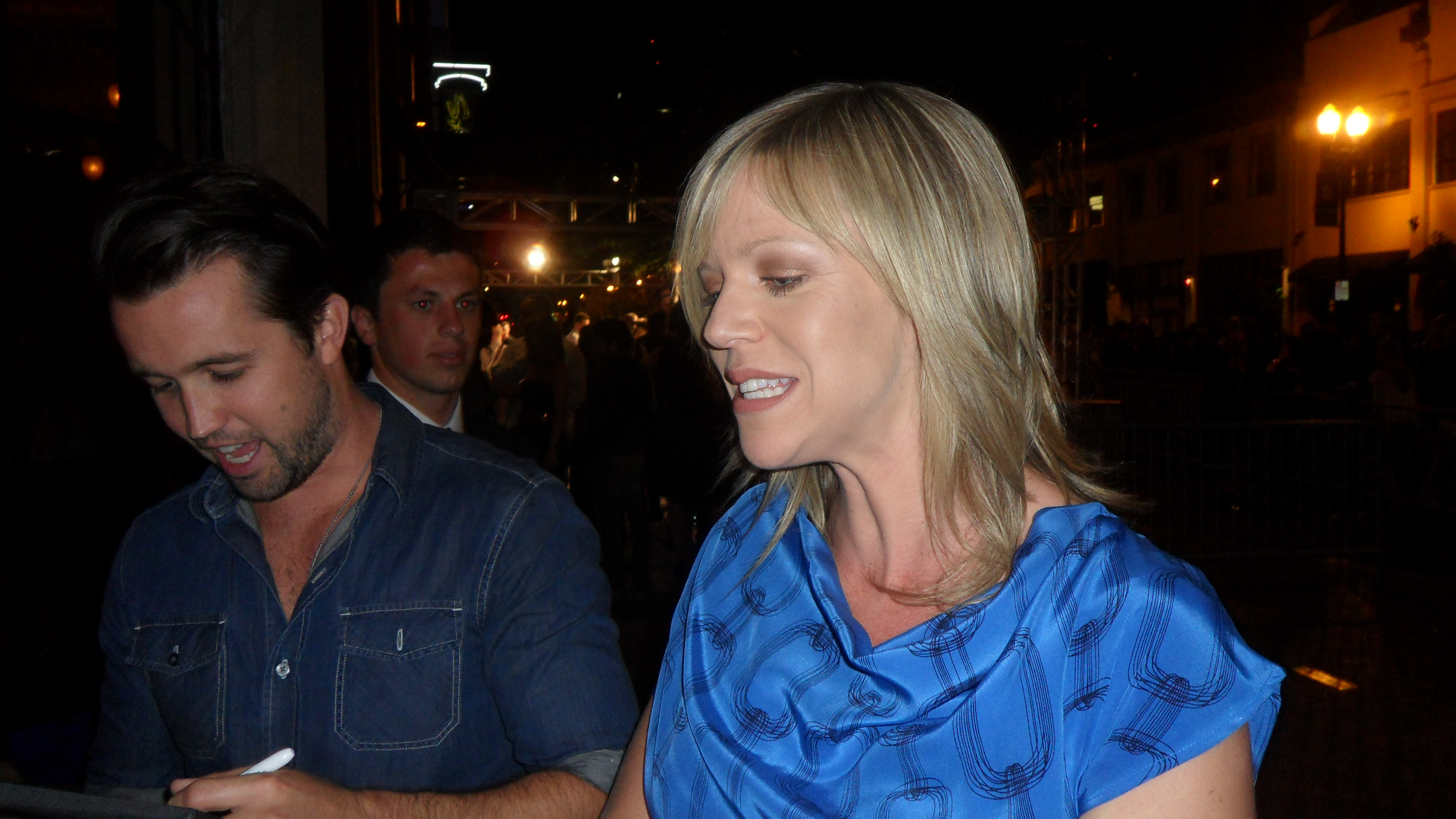
McElhenney and his wife Kaitlin Olson in July 2010

McElhenney has a sister, Katie, who co-created and wrote for the Mythic Quest spin-off series Side Quest, as well as the series High Potential, where his wife, Kaitlin Olson, serves as the lead and executive producer.

He hired Olson to play Dee Reynolds on It's Always Sunny in Philadelphia and became romantically interested in her "around season two" of the series. He has called her "the funniest woman in show business". They were married in California on September 27, 2008. They have two sons; Olson went into labor with their first son while at a Los Angeles Dodgers home game against the Philadelphia Phillies.

In July 2023, McElhenney announced he had been diagnosed with "a host of neurodevelopmental disorders and learning disabilities".

In June 2025, McElhenney announced that he filed to legally change his last name from McElhenney to Mac, to facilitate his work in South America. In the credits of It's Always Sunny's 17th season, his name was credited as "Rob Mac".

=== Body development ===
In preparation for the seventh season of It's Always Sunny, McElhenney put on 60 lb (27 kg) of fat and let his beard grow out to give extra humor to his character and add a new comedic direction for the season. His co-star Charlie Day described the weight gain as "disgusting" and said the rest of the cast was "a little on the fence about it for his own personal health and safety". McElhenney subsequently lost 23 lb (10 kg) in a month after the season was finished filming, and lost the rest of the weight later in the year in time to film the next season.

In preparation for the show's 13th season, he transformed his body again, though this time he became fit and athletic. He later joked in an Instagram post, "Look, it's not that hard. All you need to do is lift weights six days a week, stop drinking alcohol, don't eat anything after 7pm, don't eat any carbs or sugar at all, in fact just don't eat anything you like, get the personal trainer from Magic Mike, sleep nine hours a night, run three miles a day, and have a studio pay for the whole thing over a six to seven month span. I don't know why everyone's not doing this. It's a super realistic lifestyle and an appropriate body image to compare oneself to. #hollywood".

=== Influences ===
McElhenney has named the Marx Brothers, Woody Allen, Carl Reiner, Norman Lear, George Carlin, Gary David Goldberg, Larry David, and David Sedaris as his comedic influences.

== Filmography ==
=== Film ===
Year	Title	Role	Notes
1997	The Devil's Own	Kevin	Scenes deleted
1998	A Civil Action	Teenager on property	
2000	Wonder Boys	Student	Scenes deleted
2001	Thirteen Conversations About One Thing	Chris Hammond	
2001	Campfire Stories	Ricky	
2002	Long Story Short	Trent	
2003	Latter Days	Elder Harmon	
2004	The Tollbooth	Simon Stanton	
2024	Deadpool & Wolverine	Time Variance Authority Soldier	Scenes deleted

=== Television ===
Year	Title	Credited as				Role	Notes
Year	Title	Writer	Director	Producer	Actor	Role	Notes
1997	Law & Order	No	No	No	Yes	Joey Timon	Episode: "Thrill"
2004	ER	No	No	No	Yes	Andy Fesh	Episode: "Where There's Smoke"
2005–present	It's Always Sunny in Philadelphia	Yes	Yes	Executive	Yes	Ronald "Mac" McDonald	Also creator
2007–2010	Lost	No	No	No	Yes	Aldo	2 episodes
2011–2012	How to Be a Gentleman	No	No	Consulting	No	—N/a	9 episodes
2012	Unsupervised	No	No	Executive	No	—N/a	13 episodes
2014–2017	The Mindy Project	No	No	No	Yes	Louis "Lou" Tookers	4 episodes
2015	On the Record with Mick Rock.	No	No	Executive	No	—N/a	6 episodes
2017	Fargo	No	No	No	Yes	Officer Oscar Hunt	Episode: "The Law of Non-Contradiction"
2018–2019	The Cool Kids	No	No	Co-executive	No	—N/a	22 episodes
2019	Game of Thrones	No	No	No	Yes	Ironborn soldier	Episode: "Winterfell"
2020–2025	Mythic Quest	Yes	Yes	Executive	Yes	Ian Grimm	Also co-creator
2022–present	Welcome to Wrexham	No	No	Executive	Yes	Himself	Also co-creator
2024	All Town Aren't We	No	No	No	No	Himself	1 episode
2025	Abbott Elementary	No	No	No	Yes	Ronald "Mac" McDonald	Episode: "Volunteers"; Crossover with It's Always Sunny in Philadelphia
2025	Side Quest	No	No	Executive	Yes	Ian Grimm	Episode: "Song and Dance"; Spin-off of Mythic Quest
2025	Necaxa	No	No	Executive	No	—N/a	

=== Web ===
Year	Title	Role	Notes
2021–2023	The Always Sunny Podcast	Himself/host	77 episodes
2025	Royal Court	Himself	1 episode

=== Music videos ===
Year	Artist	Title	Notes
2021	Imagine Dragons	"Follow You"	Co-starring with Kaitlin Olson, both appearing as themselves

=== Video games ===
Year	Title	Role	Notes
2022	FIFA 23	Himself	Voice role
