= List of It's Always Sunny in Philadelphia episodes =

It's Always Sunny in Philadelphia is an American comedy television series created by Rob McElhenney, and developed by McElhenney and Glenn Howerton, who also serve as writers and executive producers with Charlie Day. The series premiered on August 4, 2005, on FX, and moved to its sister network FXX beginning with its ninth season. The series follows a group of five narcissistic underachievers: twins Dennis (Howerton) and Deandra "Sweet Dee" Reynolds (Kaitlin Olson), their friends Charlie Kelly (Day) and Ronald "Mac" McDonald (McElhenney), and their legal father Frank Reynolds (Danny DeVito), who run Paddy's Pub, a run-down bar in South Philadelphia.

In December 2020, the series was renewed through an eighteenth season, making it the longest-running live-action comedy series in American television history in terms of seasons. The eighteenth season premiered on August 17, 2026.

== Series overview ==
Season	Episodes	Originally released		
Season	Episodes	First released	Last released	Network
1	7	August 4, 2005	September 13, 2005	FX
2	10	June 29, 2006	August 17, 2006	FX
3	15	September 13, 2007	November 15, 2007	FX
4	13	September 18, 2008	November 20, 2008	FX
5	12	September 17, 2009	December 10, 2009	FX
6	14	September 16, 2010	December 16, 2010	FX
7	13	September 15, 2011	December 15, 2011	FX
8	10	October 11, 2012	December 20, 2012	FX
9	10	September 4, 2013	November 6, 2013	FXX
10	10	January 14, 2015	March 18, 2015	FXX
11	10	January 6, 2016	March 9, 2016	FXX
12	10	January 4, 2017	March 8, 2017	FXX
13	10	September 5, 2018	November 7, 2018	FXX
14	10	September 25, 2019	November 20, 2019	FXX
15	8	December 1, 2021	December 22, 2021	FXX
16	8	June 7, 2023	July 19, 2023	FXX
17	8	July 9, 2025	August 20, 2025	FXX/FX
18	10	August 17, 2026	October 12, 2026	FXX/FX

== Episodes ==
=== Season 1 (2005) ===
No. overall	No. in season	Title	Directed by	Written by	Original release date	Prod. code	US viewers (millions)
1	1	"The Gang Gets Racist"	John Fortenberry	Charlie Day & Rob McElhenney	August 4, 2005	IP01001	1.42
2	2	"Charlie Wants an Abortion"	John Fortenberry	Charlie Day & Rob McElhenney	August 11, 2005	IP01003	0.84
3	3	"Underage Drinking: A National Concern"	Dan Attias	Story by : Charlie Day & Rob McElhenney; Teleplay by : Rob McElhenney	August 16, 2005	IP01006	N/A
4	4	"Charlie Has Cancer"	Rob McElhenney	Rob McElhenney	August 23, 2005	IP01004	N/A
5	5	"Gun Fever"	Dan Attias	Story by : Glenn Howerton & Rob McElhenney; Teleplay by : Glenn Howerton	August 30, 2005	IP01005	N/A
6	6	"The Gang Finds a Dead Guy"	Dan Attias	Story by : Charlie Day & Glenn Howerton & Rob McElhenney; Teleplay by : Rob McElhenney	September 6, 2005	IP01007	N/A
7	7	"Charlie Got Molested"	John Fortenberry	Story by : Charlie Day & Rob McElhenney; Teleplay by : Rob McElhenney	September 13, 2005	IP01002	1.09

=== Season 2 (2006) ===
No. overall	No. in season	Title	Directed by	Written by	Original release date	Prod. code	US viewers (millions)
8	1	"Charlie Gets Crippled"	Rob McElhenney	Story by : Charlie Day & Glenn Howerton & Rob McElhenney; Teleplay by : Rob McElhenney	June 29, 2006	IP02001	1.64
9	2	"The Gang Goes Jihad"	Dan Attias	Story by : Charlie Day & Glenn Howerton & Rob McElhenney; Teleplay by : Rob McElhenney	June 29, 2006	IP02002	1.50
10	3	"Dennis and Dee Go on Welfare"	Dan Attias	Story by : Charlie Day & Glenn Howerton & Rob McElhenney; Teleplay by : Rob McElhenney	July 6, 2006	IP02004	N/A
11	4	"Mac Bangs Dennis' Mom"	Dan Attias	Charlie Day & Glenn Howerton	July 6, 2006	IP02005	N/A
12	5	"Hundred Dollar Baby"	Dan Attias	Charlie Day & Glenn Howerton & Rob McElhenney	July 13, 2006	IP02007	N/A
13	6	"The Gang Gives Back"	Dan Attias	Charlie Day	July 20, 2006	IP02003	N/A
14	7	"The Gang Exploits a Miracle"	Dan Attias	Charlie Day & Eric Falconer & Chris Romano	July 27, 2006	IP02009	N/A
15	8	"The Gang Runs for Office"	Dan Attias	David Hornsby	August 3, 2006	IP02006	N/A
16	9	"Charlie Goes America All Over Everybody's Ass"	Dan Attias	Charlie Day & Rob McElhenney	August 10, 2006	IP02008	N/A
17	10	"Dennis and Dee Get a New Dad"	Dan Attias	Story by : Charlie Day & Rob McElhenney; Teleplay by : Rob McElhenney	August 17, 2006	IP02010	0.96

=== Season 3 (2007) ===
No. overall	No. in season	Title	Directed by	Written by	Original release date	Prod. code	US viewers (millions)
18	1	"The Gang Finds a Dumpster Baby"	Jerry Levine	Charlie Day & Rob McElhenney	September 13, 2007	IP03001	2.34
19	2	"The Gang Gets Invincible"	Fred Savage	Charlie Day & David Hornsby & Glenn Howerton	September 13, 2007	IP03010	1.86
20	3	"Dennis and Dee's Mom Is Dead"	Matt Shakman	David Hornsby & Rob McElhenney	September 20, 2007	IP03013	N/A
21	4	"The Gang Gets Held Hostage"	Fred Savage	Story by : Lisa Parsons; Teleplay by : Rob McElhenney	September 20, 2007	IP03009	N/A
22	5	"The Aluminum Monster vs. Fatty Magoo"	Fred Savage	Charlie Day & Glenn Howerton	September 27, 2007	IP03007	N/A
23	6	"The Gang Solves the North Korea Situation"	Fred Savage	Charlie Day & Scott Marder & Rob Rosell	September 27, 2007	IP03006	N/A
24	7	"The Gang Sells Out"	Matt Shakman	Charlie Day & David Hornsby	October 4, 2007	IP03014	N/A
25	8	"Frank Sets Sweet Dee on Fire"	Fred Savage	Story by : Rob McElhenney; Teleplay by : Scott Marder & Rob Rosell	October 4, 2007	IP03008	N/A
26	9	"Sweet Dee's Dating a Retarded Person"	Jerry Levine	Story by : Glenn Howerton; Teleplay by : Scott Marder & Rob Rosell	October 11, 2007	IP03002	N/A
27	10	"Mac Is a Serial Killer"	Jerry Levine	Story by : Charlie Day; Teleplay by : David Hornsby	October 18, 2007	IP03003	N/A
28	11	"Dennis Looks Like a Registered Sex Offender"	Jerry Levine	Rob McElhenney	October 25, 2007	IP03005	N/A
29	12	"The Gang Gets Whacked"	Matt Shakman	Glenn Howerton & Scott Marder & Rob Rosell	November 1, 2007	IP03011	N/A
30	13	"The Gang Gets Whacked Part 2"	Matt Shakman	Scott Marder & Rob Rosell	November 1, 2007	IP03012	N/A
31	14	"Bums: Making a Mess All Over the City"	Jerry Levine	Charlie Day & David Hornsby	November 8, 2007	IP03004	N/A
32	15	"The Gang Dances Their Asses Off"	Matt Shakman	David Hornsby & Scott Marder & Rob Rosell	November 15, 2007	IP03015	0.99

=== Season 4 (2008) ===
No. overall	No. in season	Title	Directed by	Written by	Original release date	Prod. code	US viewers (millions)
33	1	"Mac and Dennis: Manhunters"	Fred Savage	Charlie Day & Jordan Young & Elijah Aron	September 18, 2008	IP04002	1.73
34	2	"The Gang Solves the Gas Crisis"	Matt Shakman	Charlie Day & Sonny Lee & Patrick Walsh	September 18, 2008	IP04009	1.60
35	3	"America's Next Top Paddy's Billboard Model Contest"	Fred Savage	Charlie Day & Rob McElhenney & Adam Stein	September 25, 2008	IP04006	1.44
36	4	"Mac's Banging the Waitress"	Matt Shakman	David Hornsby	September 25, 2008	IP04011	1.35
37	5	"Mac and Charlie Die"	Fred Savage & Matt Shakman	Charlie Day & Glenn Howerton & Rob McElhenney	October 2, 2008	IP04003	1.02
38	6	"Mac and Charlie Die Part 2"	Fred Savage	Charlie Day & Glenn Howerton & Rob McElhenney	October 2, 2008	IP04004	1.02
39	7	"Who Pooped the Bed?"	Fred Savage	Rob McElhenney & Scott Marder & Rob Rosell	October 9, 2008	IP04007	1.28
40	8	"Paddy's Pub: The Worst Bar in Philadelphia"	Matt Shakman	Scott Marder & Rob Rosell & David Hornsby	October 16, 2008	IP04012	1.27
41	9	"Dennis Reynolds: An Erotic Life"	Fred Savage	Glenn Howerton & Scott Marder & Rob Rosell	October 23, 2008	IP04005	1.32
42	10	"Sweet Dee Has a Heart Attack"	Matt Shakman	Scott Marder & Rob Rosell	October 30, 2008	IP04013	1.15
43	11	"The Gang Cracks the Liberty Bell"	Matt Shakman	Rob McElhenney & Glenn Howerton & David Hornsby	November 6, 2008	IP04010	1.36
44	12	"The Gang Gets Extreme: Home Makeover Edition"	Fred Savage	Charlie Day & David Hornsby & Glenn Howerton	November 13, 2008	IP04001	1.31
45	13	"The Nightman Cometh"	Matt Shakman	Rob McElhenney & Glenn Howerton & Charlie Day	November 20, 2008	IP04008	1.30

=== Season 5 (2009) ===
No. overall	No. in season	Title	Directed by	Written by	Original release date	Prod. code	US viewers (millions)
46	1	"The Gang Exploits the Mortgage Crisis"	Randall Einhorn	Becky Mann & Audra Sielaff	September 17, 2009	IP05008	2.24
47	2	"The Gang Hits the Road"	Fred Savage	Glenn Howerton & Charlie Day	September 24, 2009	IP05005	1.79
48	3	"The Great Recession"	Fred Savage	David Hornsby	October 1, 2009	IP05007	2.01
49	4	"The Gang Gives Frank an Intervention"	Fred Savage	Scott Marder & Rob Rosell	October 8, 2009	IP05006	1.51
50	5	"The Waitress Is Getting Married"	Fred Savage	Glenn Howerton & Charlie Day	October 15, 2009	IP05004	1.61
51	6	"The World Series Defense"	Randall Einhorn	David Hornsby	October 22, 2009	IP05014	1.61
52	7	"The Gang Wrestles for the Troops"	Randall Einhorn	Scott Marder & Rob Rosell	October 29, 2009	IP05012	1.35
53	8	"Paddy's Pub: Home of the Original Kitten Mittens"	Randall Einhorn	Sonny Lee & Patrick Walsh	November 5, 2009	IP05011	1.99
54	9	"Mac and Dennis Break Up"	Fred Savage	Scott Marder & Rob Rosell	November 12, 2009	IP05003	1.87
55	10	"The D.E.N.N.I.S. System"	Randall Einhorn	David Hornsby & Scott Marder & Rob Rosell	November 19, 2009	IP05013	1.49
56	11	"Mac and Charlie Write a Movie"	Randall Einhorn	Glenn Howerton & Rob McElhenney	December 3, 2009	IP05009	1.89
57	12	"The Gang Reignites the Rivalry"	Randall Einhorn	Dave Chernin & Charlie Day	December 10, 2009	IP05010	1.68

=== Season 6 (2010) ===
No. overall	No. in season	Title	Directed by	Written by	Original release date	Prod. code	US viewers (millions)
58	1	"Mac Fights Gay Marriage"	Randall Einhorn	Becky Mann & Audra Sielaff	September 16, 2010	XIP06005	2.21
59	2	"Dennis Gets Divorced"	Randall Einhorn	Dave Chernin & John Chernin	September 23, 2010	XIP06006	1.68
60	3	"The Gang Buys a Boat"	Randall Einhorn	Charlie Day & Rob McElhenney	September 30, 2010	XIP06001	1.46
61	4	"Mac's Big Break"	Randall Einhorn	Rob Rosell	October 7, 2010	XIP06002	1.23
62	5	"Mac and Charlie: White Trash"	Randall Einhorn	Luvh Rakhe	October 14, 2010	XIP06003	1.48
63	6	"Mac's Mom Burns Her House Down"	Matt Shakman	Scott Marder & Rob Rosell	October 21, 2010	XIP06008	1.07
64	7	"Who Got Dee Pregnant?"	Randall Einhorn	Charlie Day & Rob McElhenney	October 28, 2010	XIP06007	1.19
65	8	"The Gang Gets a New Member"	Matt Shakman	David Hornsby	November 4, 2010	XIP06009	1.67
66	9	"Dee Reynolds: Shaping America's Youth"	Matt Shakman	David Hornsby	November 11, 2010	XIP06010	1.44
67	10	"Charlie Kelly: King of the Rats"	Matt Shakman	Scott Marder & Rob Rosell	November 18, 2010	XIP06011	1.69
68	11	"The Gang Gets Stranded in the Woods"	Matt Shakman	Story by : Luvh Rakhe; Teleplay by : Scott Marder & Rob Rosell	December 2, 2010	XIP06012	1.65
69	12	"Dee Gives Birth"	Matt Shakman	David Hornsby & Becky Mann & Audra Sielaff	December 9, 2010	XIP06013	1.46
70	13	"A Very Sunny Christmas"	Fred Savage	Charlie Day & Rob McElhenney	December 16, 2010^{[a]}	IP05001	1.16
71	14	"A Very Sunny Christmas"	Fred Savage	Charlie Day & Rob McElhenney	December 16, 2010^{[a]}	IP05002	1.16

=== Season 7 (2011) ===
No. overall	No. in season	Title	Directed by	Written by	Original release date	Prod. code	US viewers (millions)
72	1	"Frank's Pretty Woman"	Matt Shakman	Scott Marder & Rob Rosell	September 15, 2011	XIP07002	2.28
73	2	"The Gang Goes to the Jersey Shore"	Matt Shakman	Dave Chernin & John Chernin	September 22, 2011	XIP07012	1.93
74	3	"Frank Reynolds’ Little Beauties"	Matt Shakman	Scott Marder & Rob Rosell	September 29, 2011	XIP07011	2.03
75	4	"Sweet Dee Gets Audited"	Matt Shakman	Rob McElhenney & Glenn Howerton & Charlie Day	October 6, 2011	XIP07010	1.82
76	5	"Frank's Brother"	Matt Shakman	David Hornsby	October 13, 2011	XIP07004	1.42
77	6	"The Storm of the Century"	Matt Shakman	Charles W. Hornsby	October 20, 2011	XIP07008	1.52
78	7	"Chardee MacDennis: The Game of Games"	Matt Shakman	Charlie Day & Rob McElhenney	October 27, 2011	XIP07001	1.38
79	8	"The ANTI-Social Network"	Matt Shakman	Charlie Day & Glenn Howerton	November 3, 2011	XIP07003	1.69
80	9	"The Gang Gets Trapped"	Matt Shakman	Luvh Rakhe	November 10, 2011	XIP07009	1.32
81	10	"How Mac Got Fat"	Randall Einhorn; Matt Shakman	Scott Marder and Mehar Sethi	November 17, 2011	XIP06004	1.26
82	11	"Thunder Gun Express"	Matt Shakman	Dave Chernin & John Chernin	December 1, 2011	XIP07007	1.52
83	12	"The High School Reunion"	Matt Shakman	Glenn Howerton & Rob McElhenney	December 8, 2011	XIP07005	1.40
84	13	"The High School Reunion Part 2: The Gang's Revenge"	Matt Shakman	Glenn Howerton & Rob McElhenney	December 15, 2011	XIP07006	1.32

=== Season 8 (2012) ===
No. overall	No. in season	Title	Directed by	Written by	Original release date	Prod. code	US viewers (millions)
85	1	"Pop-Pop: The Final Solution"	Matt Shakman	Charlie Day & Glenn Howerton & Rob McElhenney	October 11, 2012	XIP08002	1.05
86	2	"The Gang Recycles Their Trash"	Matt Shakman	Charlie Day & Glenn Howerton & Rob McElhenney	October 18, 2012	XIP08001	1.10
87	3	"The Maureen Ponderosa Wedding Massacre"	Richie Keen	Charlie Day & Glenn Howerton & Rob McElhenney	October 25, 2012	XIP08009	1.12
88	4	"Charlie and Dee Find Love"	Richie Keen	Charlie Day & Glenn Howerton & Rob McElhenney	November 1, 2012	XIP08006	1.39
89	5	"The Gang Gets Analyzed"	Todd Biermann	Luvh Rakhe	November 8, 2012	XIP08005	1.11
90	6	"Charlie's Mom Has Cancer"	Richie Keen	Scott Marder & Rob Rosell	November 15, 2012	XIP08008	0.94
91	7	"Frank's Back in Business"	Richie Keen	Dave Chernin & John Chernin	November 29, 2012	XIP08007	1.08
92	8	"Charlie Rules the World"	Matt Shakman	David Hornsby	December 6, 2012	XIP08003	1.01
93	9	"The Gang Dines Out"	Matt Shakman	Mehar Sethi	December 13, 2012	XIP08004	0.92
94	10	"Reynolds vs. Reynolds: The Cereal Defense"	Richie Keen	Charlie Day & Glenn Howerton & Rob McElhenney	December 20, 2012	XIP08010	0.94

=== Season 9 (2013) ===
No. overall	No. in season	Title	Directed by	Written by	Original release date	Prod. code	US viewers (millions)
95	1	"The Gang Broke Dee"	Richie Keen	Charlie Day & Glenn Howerton & Rob McElhenney	September 4, 2013	XIP09001	0.757
96	2	"Gun Fever Too: Still Hot"	Todd Biermann	Charlie Day & Glenn Howerton & Rob McElhenney	September 11, 2013	XIP09005	0.606
97	3	"The Gang Tries Desperately to Win an Award"	Richie Keen	David Hornsby	September 18, 2013	XIP09003	0.521
98	4	"Mac and Dennis Buy a Timeshare"	Dan Attias	Dave Chernin & John Chernin	September 25, 2013	XIP09008	0.458
99	5	"Mac Day"	Richie Keen	Charlie Day & Glenn Howerton & Rob McElhenney	October 2, 2013	XIP09004	0.459
100	6	"The Gang Saves the Day"	Dan Attias	Dave Chernin & John Chernin	October 9, 2013	XIP09007	0.509
101	7	"The Gang Gets Quarantined"	Heath Cullens	David Hornsby	October 16, 2013	XIP09010	0.574
102	8	"Flowers for Charlie"	Dan Attias	David Benioff & D. B. Weiss	October 23, 2013	XIP09009	0.460
103	9	"The Gang Makes Lethal Weapon 6"	Dan Attias	Scott Marder	October 30, 2013	XIP09006	0.427
104	10	"The Gang Squashes Their Beefs"	Todd Biermann	Rob Rosell	November 6, 2013	XIP09002	0.535

=== Season 10 (2015) ===
No. overall	No. in season	Title	Directed by	Written by	Original release date	Prod. code	US viewers (millions)
105	1	"The Gang Beats Boggs"	Todd Biermann	Dave Chernin & John Chernin	January 14, 2015	XIP10001	0.786
106	2	"The Gang Group Dates"	Richie Keen	Rob Rosell	January 21, 2015	XIP10008	0.524
107	3	"Psycho Pete Returns"	Todd Biermann	Charlie Day & Glenn Howerton & Rob McElhenney	January 28, 2015	XIP10002	0.511
108	4	"Charlie Work"	Matt Shakman	Charlie Day & Glenn Howerton & Rob McElhenney	February 4, 2015	XIP10004	0.554
109	5	"The Gang Spies Like U.S."	Matt Shakman	David Hornsby	February 11, 2015	XIP10003	0.527
110	6	"The Gang Misses the Boat"	Richie Keen	Charlie Day & Glenn Howerton & Rob McElhenney	February 18, 2015	XIP10007	0.544
111	7	"Mac Kills His Dad"	Heath Cullens	Dave Chernin & John Chernin and David Hornsby	February 25, 2015	XIP10010	0.442
112	8	"The Gang Goes on Family Fight"	Matt Shakman	Charlie Day & Glenn Howerton & Rob McElhenney	March 4, 2015	XIP10005	0.445
113	9	"Frank Retires"	Richie Keen	Charlie Day & Glenn Howerton & Rob McElhenney	March 11, 2015	XIP10006	0.505
114	10	"Ass Kickers United: Mac and Charlie Join a Cult"	Heath Cullens	Scott Marder	March 18, 2015	XIP10009	0.543

=== Season 11 (2016) ===
No. overall	No. in season	Title	Directed by	Written by	Original release date	Prod. code	US viewers (millions)
115	1	"Chardee MacDennis 2: Electric Boogaloo"	Heath Cullens	Rob McElhenney & Charlie Day	January 6, 2016	XIP11005	0.716
116	2	"Frank Falls Out the Window"	Heath Cullens	David Hornsby	January 13, 2016	XIP11004	0.511
117	3	"The Gang Hits the Slopes"	Heath Cullens	Dave Chernin & John Chernin	January 20, 2016	XIP11001	0.609
118	4	"Dee Made a Smut Film"	Todd Biermann	Eric Ledgin	January 27, 2016	XIP11006	0.478
119	5	"Mac & Dennis Move to the Suburbs"	Todd Biermann	Hunter Covington	February 3, 2016	XIP11010	0.563
120	6	"Being Frank"	Heath Cullens	Scott Marder	February 10, 2016	XIP11002	0.536
121	7	"McPoyle vs. Ponderosa: The Trial of the Century"	Todd Biermann	Conor Galvin	February 17, 2016	XIP11009	0.531
122	8	"Charlie Catches a Leprechaun"	Heath Cullens	Jon Silberman & Josh Silberman	February 24, 2016	XIP11003	0.515
123	9	"The Gang Goes to Hell"	Todd Biermann	David Hornsby & Scott Marder	March 2, 2016	XIP11007	0.485
124	10	"The Gang Goes to Hell: Part Two"	Todd Biermann	David Hornsby & Scott Marder	March 9, 2016	XIP11008	0.460

=== Season 12 (2017) ===
No. overall	No. in season	Title	Directed by	Written by	Original release date	Prod. code	US viewers (millions)
125	1	"The Gang Turns Black"	Matt Shakman	Charlie Day & Glenn Howerton & Rob McElhenney	January 4, 2017	XIP12008	0.730
126	2	"The Gang Goes to a Water Park"	Matt Shakman	Eric Ledgin	January 11, 2017	XIP12007	0.574
127	3	"Old Lady House: A Situation Comedy"	Maurice Marable	Dannah Phirman & Danielle Schneider	January 18, 2017	XIP12005	0.602
128	4	"Wolf Cola: A Public Relations Nightmare"	Matt Shakman	David Hornsby & Scott Marder	January 25, 2017	XIP12006	0.629
129	5	"Making Dennis Reynolds a Murderer"	Maurice Marable	Conor Galvin	February 1, 2017	XIP12004	0.602
130	6	"Hero or Hate Crime?"	Jamie Babbit	Charlie Day & Glenn Howerton & Rob McElhenney	February 8, 2017	XIP12002	0.551
131	7	"PTSDee"	Jamie Babbit	Charlie Day & Glenn Howerton & Rob McElhenney	February 15, 2017	XIP12003	0.572
132	8	"The Gang Tends Bar"	Matt Shakman	Megan Ganz	February 22, 2017	XIP12009	0.587
133	9	"A Cricket's Tale"	Jamie Babbit	David Hornsby & Scott Marder	March 1, 2017	XIP12001	0.523
134	10	"Dennis' Double Life"	Matt Shakman	Charlie Day & Glenn Howerton & Rob McElhenney	March 8, 2017	XIP12010	0.640

=== Season 13 (2018) ===
No. overall	No. in season	Title	Directed by	Written by	Original release date	Prod. code	US viewers (millions)
135	1	"The Gang Makes Paddy's Great Again"	Todd Biermann	David Hornsby	September 5, 2018	XIP13010	0.606
136	2	"The Gang Escapes"	LP	Megan Ganz	September 12, 2018	XIP13006	0.390
137	3	"The Gang Beats Boggs: Ladies' Reboot"	Kat Coiro	Dannah Phirman & Danielle Schneider	September 19, 2018	XIP13002	0.420
138	4	"Time's Up for the Gang"	Kat Coiro	Megan Ganz	September 26, 2018	XIP13001	0.312
139	5	"The Gang Gets New Wheels"	Todd Biermann	Conor Galvin	October 3, 2018	XIP13007	0.319
140	6	"The Gang Solves the Bathroom Problem"	Josh Drisko	Erin Ryan	October 10, 2018	XIP13005	0.342
141	7	"The Gang Does a Clip Show"	Todd Biermann	Dannah Phirman & Danielle Schneider	October 17, 2018	XIP13008	0.298
142	8	"Charlie's Home Alone"	Kat Coiro	Adam Weinstock & Andy Jones	October 24, 2018	XIP13004	0.294
143	9	"The Gang Wins the Big Game"	Kat Coiro	Conor Galvin	October 31, 2018	XIP13003	0.323
144	10	"Mac Finds His Pride"	Todd Biermann	Rob McElhenney & Charlie Day	November 7, 2018	XIP13009	0.357

=== Season 14 (2019) ===
No. overall	No. in season	Title	Directed by	Written by	Original release date	Prod. code	US viewers (millions)
145	1	"The Gang Gets Romantic"	Glenn Howerton	Rob McElhenney & Charlie Day	September 25, 2019	XIP14001	0.481
146	2	"Thunder Gun 4: Maximum Cool"	Heath Cullens	Conor Galvin	October 2, 2019	XIP14006	0.317
147	3	"Dee Day"	Pete Chatmon	Megan Ganz	October 9, 2019	XIP14010	0.308
148	4	"The Gang Chokes"	Glenn Howerton	John Howell Harris	October 16, 2019	XIP14002	0.296
149	5	"The Gang Texts"	Tim Roche	Rob McElhenney & Charlie Day	October 23, 2019	XIP14004	0.259
150	6	"The Janitor Always Mops Twice"	Heath Cullens	Megan Ganz	October 30, 2019	XIP14005	0.248
151	7	"The Gang Solves Global Warming"	Pete Chatmon	Rob McElhenney & Charlie Day	November 6, 2019	XIP14008	0.261
152	8	"Paddy's Has a Jumper"	Kimberly McCullough	Dannah Phirman & Danielle Schneider	November 13, 2019	XIP14003	0.314
153	9	"A Woman's Right to Chop"	Pete Chatmon	Dannah Phirman & Danielle Schneider	November 20, 2019	XIP14009	0.268
154	10	"Waiting for Big Mo"	Pete Chatmon	David Hornsby	November 20, 2019	XIP14007	0.236

=== Season 15 (2021) ===
No. overall	No. in season	Title	Directed by	Written by	Original release date	Prod. code	US viewers (millions)
155	1	"2020: A Year in Review"	Todd Biermann	Rob McElhenney & Charlie Day & Glenn Howerton	December 1, 2021	XIP15001	0.285
156	2	"The Gang Makes Lethal Weapon 7"	Pete Chatmon	Keyonna Taylor & Katie McElhenney	December 1, 2021	XIP15002	0.237
157	3	"The Gang Buys a Roller Rink"	Richie Keen	Rob Rosell & David Hornsby	December 8, 2021	XIP15003	0.318
158	4	"The Gang Replaces Dee with a Monkey"	Todd Biermann	Glenn Howerton & Nina Pedrad	December 8, 2021	XIP15004	0.235
159	5	"The Gang Goes to Ireland"	Megan Ganz	Rob McElhenney & Charlie Day & Glenn Howerton	December 15, 2021	XIP15005	0.285
160	6	"The Gang's Still in Ireland"	Megan Ganz	Rob McElhenney & Charlie Day & Glenn Howerton	December 15, 2021	XIP15006	0.232
161	7	"Dee Sinks in a Bog"	Pete Chatmon	David Hornsby & Rob Rosell	December 22, 2021	XIP15007	0.293
162	8	"The Gang Carries a Corpse Up a Mountain"	Richie Keen	Megan Ganz	December 22, 2021	XIP15008	0.255

=== Season 16 (2023) ===
No. overall	No. in season	Title	Directed by	Written by	Original release date	Prod. code	US viewers (millions)
163	1	"The Gang Inflates"	Heath Cullens	Nina Pedrad	June 7, 2023	XIP16001	0.305
164	2	"Frank Shoots Every Member of the Gang"	Richie Keen	Davis Kop	June 7, 2023	XIP16004	0.216
165	3	"The Gang Gets Cursed"	Richie Keen	David Hornsby	June 14, 2023	XIP16003	0.279
166	4	"Frank vs. Russia"	Heath Cullens	Megan Ganz	June 21, 2023	XIP16002	0.205
167	5	"Celebrity Booze: The Ultimate Cash Grab"	Megan Ganz	Rob McElhenney & Charlie Day & Glenn Howerton	June 28, 2023	XIP16006	0.268
168	6	"Risk E. Rat's Pizza and Amusement Center"	Nina Pedrad	Rob Rosell	July 5, 2023	XIP16007	0.232
169	7	"The Gang Goes Bowling"	Megan Ganz	Rob McElhenney & Charlie Day & Glenn Howerton	July 12, 2023	XIP16005	0.262
170	8	"Dennis Takes a Mental Health Day"	Heath Cullens	Ross Maloney	July 19, 2023	XIP16008	0.278

=== Season 17 (2025) ===
No. overall	No. in season	Title	Directed by	Written by	Original release date	Prod. code	US viewers (millions) (Note: Combined viewership on FXX and FX.)
171	1	"The Gang F***s Up Abbott Elementary"	Todd Biermann	Charlie Day & Rob McElhenney & Keyonna Taylor	July 9, 2025	XIP17005	0.355
172	2	"Frank Is in a Coma"	Imani Hakim	Dave Chernin & John Chernin	July 9, 2025	XIP17007	0.274
173	3	"Mac and Dennis Become EMTs"	Heath Cullens	Charlie Day & Rob McElhenney & Nina Pedrad	July 16, 2025	XIP17002	0.304
174	4	"Thought Leadership: A Corporate Conversation"	Zachary Knighton	Charlie Day & Rob McElhenney	July 23, 2025	XIP17004	0.231
175	5	"The Gang Goes to a Dog Track"	Heath Cullens	Charlie Day & Ross Maloney	July 30, 2025	XIP17001	0.204
176	6	"Overage Drinking: A National Concern"	Ashly Burch	Charlie Day & Rob McElhenney	August 6, 2025	XIP17003	0.304
177	7	"The Gang Gets Ready for Prime Time"	Dave Chernin & John Chernin	Charlie Day & David Hornsby & Rob Rosell	August 13, 2025	XIP17008	0.282
178	8	"The Golden Bachelor Live"	Todd Biermann	Charlie Day & Rob McElhenney	August 20, 2025	XIP17006	0.285

=== Season 18 (2026) ===
No. overall	No. in season	Title	Directed by	Written by	Original release date	Prod. code
179	1	"Frank Marries a Corpse"	Todd Biermann	Charlie Day	August 17, 2026	XIP18001
180	2	"Dennis and Dee Don't Get Rich"	Todd Biermann	Charlie Day & Glenn Howerton	August 17, 2026	XIP18002
181	3	"The Gang Gets Tested"	Richie Keen	Charlie Day	August 24, 2026	TBA
182	4	"2026: A Virtual Insanity"	Heath Cullens	Rob Rosell & Vanessa McGee	August 31, 2026	TBA
183	5	"The Gang Goes to the Ren Faire"	Richie Keen	Dave Chernin & John Chernin & Rob Rosell	September 7, 2026	TBA
184	6	"The War on Alcohol"	Dave Chernin & John Chernin	Dave Chernin & John Chernin	September 14, 2026	TBA
185	7	TBA	TBA	TBA	September 21, 2026	TBA
186	8	TBA	TBA	TBA	September 28, 2026	TBA
187	9	TBA	TBA	TBA	October 5, 2026	TBA
188	10	TBA	TBA	TBA	October 12, 2026	TBA
