= It's Always Sunny in Philadelphia season 16 =

2023 season of American television series

It's Always Sunny in Philadelphia
- Season 16
- Promotional poster
- Starring: Charlie Day; Glenn Howerton; Rob McElhenney; Kaitlin Olson; Danny DeVito
- No. of episodes: 8

Release
- Original network: FXX
- Original release: June 7 – July 19, 2023

Season chronology
- ← Previous; Season 15 Next → Season 17

The sixteenth season of the American television sitcom series It's Always Sunny in Philadelphia premiered on FXX on June 7 and concluded on July 19, 2023, consisting of eight episodes. This season has first on demand availability on FXNOW and next day availability on Hulu.

== Cast ==
=== Main cast ===
- Charlie Day as Charlie Kelly
- Glenn Howerton as Dennis Reynolds
- Rob McElhenney as Ronald "Mac" McDonald
- Kaitlin Olson as Deandra "Dee" Reynolds
- Danny DeVito as Frank Reynolds

=== Special guest cast ===
- Bryan Cranston as "Mr. Middle" / himself (Note: In "Celebrity Booze: The Ultimate Cash Grab", Bryan Cranston and Aaron Paul portray unnamed parodic fictionalised version of themselves, referred to simply as "Mr. Middle" and "Malcolm" respectively, who maintain a relationally aggressive interpersonal relationship paralleling that of Mac and Dennis.)
- Aaron Paul as "Malcolm" / himself

=== Recurring cast ===
- Mary Elizabeth Ellis as The Waitress
- Lynne Marie Stewart as Bonnie Kelly
- Sandy Martin as Mrs. Mac

=== Guest cast ===
- David Hornsby as Matthew "Rickety Cricket" Mara
- Artemis Pebdani as Artemis Dubois
- Mary Lynn Rajskub as Gail the Snail
- Jimmi Simpson as Liam McPoyle
- Nate Mooney as Ryan McPoyle
- Gregory Scott Cummins as Donald McDonald
- Olivia Cohen as Bunny Kelly
- Isabella Cohen as Candy Kelly
- Rhea Perlman as Bertha Fussy
- Chase Utley as himself
- CJ Hoff as The Kid
- Andrew Friedman as Jack Kelly
- Ross Kimball as Limo Driver
- Ian Sharkey as Sam
- H. Michael Croner as Dog

== Production ==
The series was renewed for a sixteenth season in December 2020, along with two additional seasons confirmed. Filming began in January 2023 and concluded in March 2023.

== Episodes ==
| No. overall | No. in season | Title | Directed by | Written by | Original release date | Prod. code | US viewers (millions) |
|---|---|---|---|---|---|---|---|
| 163 | 1 | "The Gang Inflates" | Heath Cullens | Nina Pedrad | June 7, 2023 | XIP16001 | 0.305 |
Inflation is affecting the gang's business. Due to this, Dennis and Mac decide to get into selling inflatable furniture. Dee is facing eviction and is looking for a place to stay. Charlie pitches his cryptocurrency investment plan to Frank.
| 164 | 2 | "Frank Shoots Every Member of the Gang" | Richie Keen | Davis Kop | June 7, 2023 | XIP16004 | 0.216 |
After Frank accidentally shoots Dennis and Dee, they plan on taking his gun away for everyone's safety. Charlie and Mac go on a road trip with their moms to get their respective inheritances.
| 165 | 3 | "The Gang Gets Cursed" | Richie Keen | David Hornsby | June 14, 2023 | XIP16003 | 0.279 |
After a series of misfortunes, The Gang ponders whether or not they are cursed. Mac finally gets to meet Chase Utley in person.
| 166 | 4 | "Frank vs. Russia" | Heath Cullens | Megan Ganz | June 21, 2023 | XIP16002 | 0.205 |
Charlie supports Frank at a chess tournament, while Dennis helps Mac and Dee find boyfriends.
| 167 | 5 | "Celebrity Booze: The Ultimate Cash Grab" | Megan Ganz | Rob McElhenney & Charlie Day & Glenn Howerton | June 28, 2023 | XIP16006 | 0.268 |
Dennis, Mac and Charlie attempt to pitch a new alcohol to "Mr. Middle" and "Malcolm", while Frank and Dee circle Philly in a private plane.
| 168 | 6 | "Risk E. Rat's Pizza and Amusement Center" | Nina Pedrad | Rob Rosell | July 5, 2023 | XIP16007 | 0.232 |
The Gang goes to Risk E. Rat's, a Chuck E. Cheese-style restaurant and arcade center, to relive their childhoods, only to find out the characters, prizes, and aesthetic have changed due to safety concerns and political correctness.
| 169 | 7 | "The Gang Goes Bowling" | Megan Ganz | Rob McElhenney & Charlie Day & Glenn Howerton | July 12, 2023 | XIP16005 | 0.262 |
Dee joins Artemis, Gail the Snail and the Waitress for bowling at an alley owned by Liam and Ryan McPoyle, but the men show up to crash it.
| 170 | 8 | "Dennis Takes a Mental Health Day" | Heath Cullens | Ross Maloney | July 19, 2023 | XIP16008 | 0.278 |
Dennis attempts to lower his high blood pressure by spending time at the beach, but struggles to get there by having to go through several new systems and apps, while the rest of the gang attempts to use a high pressure cooker.

== Reception ==
On Rotten Tomatoes, the season has an approval rating of 100% with an average score of 7.9 out of 10 based on 9 reviews.
