= Aaron Paul filmography =

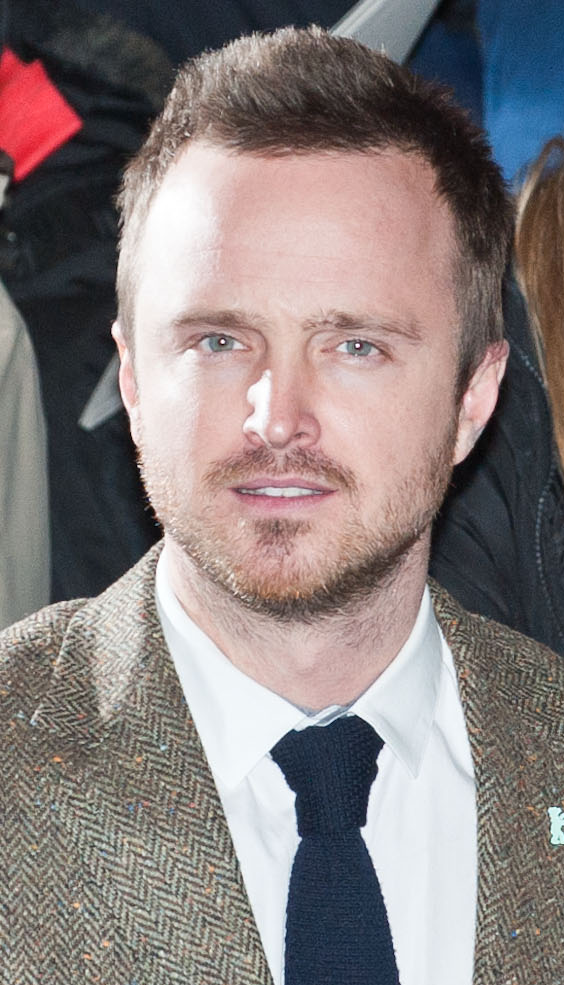
Paul in February 2014

Aaron Paul is an American actor. The following are his roles in films, television series, audio series, and music videos.

== Film ==
Year	Title	Role	Notes
2000	Whatever It Takes	Floyd	
2000	Help! I'm a Fish	Chuck	Voice
2001	K-PAX	Michael Powell	
2002	National Lampoon's Van Wilder	Wasted Guy	
2002	Wasted	Owen Turner	
2004	Perfect Opposites	Monty Brandt	
2005	Candy Paint	Brad Miller	Short film
2005	Bad Girls from Valley High	Jonathan Wharton	
2006	Choking Man	Jerry	
2006	Mission: Impossible III	Rick Meade	
2007	Daydreamer	Clinton Roark	
2007	Leo	Hustler	Short film
2008	Say Goodnight	Victor	
2009	The Last House on the Left	Francis Stillo	
2010	Wreckage	Rick	
2010	Weird: the Al Yankovic Story (Note: Not to be confused with the 2022 live action film Weird: the Al Yankovic Story)	"Weird Al" Yankovic	Short film
2011	Quirky Girl	Joseph	Short film
2012	Smashed	Charlie Hannah	
2013	Decoding Annie Parker	Paul	
2014	Need for Speed	Tobey Marshall	
2014	A Long Way Down	J.J. Maguire	
2014	Hellion	Hollis Wilson	Also co-executive producer
2014	Exodus: Gods and Kings	Joshua	
2015	Unity	Narrator	Documentary; voice
2015	Eye in the Sky	2nd Lieutenant Steve Watts	
2015	Fathers and Daughters	Cameron	
2016	Triple 9	Gabe Welch	
2016	Central Intelligence	Phil Stanton	
2016	Kingsglaive: Final Fantasy XV	Nyx Ulric	Voice; English dub
2016	The 9th Life of Louis Drax	Peter Drax	
2016	Come and Find Me	David Larraine	
2018	American Woman	Chris	
2018	Welcome Home	Bryan Palmer	
2019	The Parts You Lose	The Man	Also producer
2019	El Camino: A Breaking Bad Movie	Jesse Pinkman	Also producer
2020	Adam	Adam Niskar	
2022	Dual	Trent	
2025	Ash	Brion Cargyle	
2026	The Get Out	Jeff	
2026	Clayface	Jimmy Hagen / Jimmy One-Nut	Uncredited cameo
2027	Anything but Ghosts †	TBA	Post-production
2027	Snoop †	Jimmy Iovine	Filming
TBA	The Midnight Pool †	Johnny Black	Post-production
TBA	Night House †	Richard	Post-production

== Television ==
Year	Title	Role	Notes
1999	Beverly Hills, 90210	Chad	Episode: "Fortune Cookie"
1999	Melrose Place	Frat Boy	Episode: "The Daughterboy"
1999	Suddenly Susan	'Zipper'	Episode: "A Day in the Life"
1999	3rd Rock from the Sun	Student	Episode: "Dick's Big Giant Headache: Part II"
2000	The Price Is Right	Himself	Contestant
2000	Get Real	Derek	Episode: "History Lessons"
2001	100 Deeds for Eddie McDowd	Ethan	Episode: "Eddie Loves Tori"
2001	The Division	Tyler Petersen	Episode: "Hero"
2001	Nikki	Scott	Episode: "Family Lies"
2001	The Guardian	Ethan Ritter	Episode: "The Men from the Boys"
2001	The X-Files	David 'Winky' Winkle	Episode: "Lord of the Flies"
2001–2002	Judging Amy	'X-Ray' Conklin	2 episodes
2002	CSI: Crime Scene Investigation	Peter Hutchins Jr.	Episode: "Felonious Monk"
2002	Birds of Prey	Jerry	Episode: "Pilot"
2002	NYPD Blue	Marcus Denton	Episode: "Oh, Mama!"
2003	ER	Doug	Episode: "A Saint in the City"
2003	Kingpin	Stoner	Episode: "El Velorio"
2003	CSI: Miami	Ben Gordon	Episode: "Grave Young Men"
2003	Guiding Light	Adrian Pascal	1 episode
2003	Threat Matrix	Shane	Episode: "Natural Borne Killers"
2004	Line of Fire	Drew Parkman	Episode: "Mother & Child Reunion"
2005	Veronica Mars	Eddie LaRoche	Episode: "Silence of the Lamb"
2005	Joan of Arcadia	DeNunzio	Episode: "Secret Service"
2005	Point Pleasant	Mark Owens	3 episodes
2005	Criminal Minds	Michael Zizzo	Episode: "The Popular Kids"
2005	Sleeper Cell	Teen	Episode: "Al-Faitha"
2006	Bones	Stew Ellis	Episode: "The Superhero in the Alley"
2006	Ghost Whisperer	'Link'	Episode: "Fury"
2007–2011	Big Love	Scott Quittman	14 episodes
2008–2013	Breaking Bad	Jesse Pinkman	62 episodes
2012	Robot Chicken	Glenn	Voice, episode: "Robot Chicken DC Comics Special"
2012–2013	Tron: Uprising	Cyrus	Voice, 3 episodes
2013	The Simpsons	Jesse Pinkman	Episode: "What Animated Women Want"
2013	Saturday Night Live	Jesse Pinkman / Meth Nephew	Episode: "Tina Fey/Arcade Fire"
2013	MythBusters	Himself	Episode: "Breaking Bad Special"
2014	Top Gear	Himself	Star in a reasonably priced car
2014–2020	BoJack Horseman	Todd Chavez	Voice, 76 episodes; also executive producer
2016–2018	The Path	Eddie Lane	36 episodes; also producer
2017, 2023	Black Mirror	Gamer691 (voice) / Cliff Stanfield	2 episodes ("USS Callister" and "Beyond the Sea")
2019–2020	Truth Be Told	Warren Cave	8 episodes
2020–2022	Westworld	Caleb Nichols	13 episodes
2022	Better Call Saul	Jesse Pinkman	2 episodes
2023	It's Always Sunny in Philadelphia	Himself	Episode: "Celebrity Booze: The Ultimate Cash Grab"
2025	Invincible	Scott Duvall / Powerplex	Voice, 2 episodes
TBA	Fallout †	TBA	Season 3

== Video games ==
Year	Title	Role	Notes
2025	Dispatch	Robert Robertson III / Mecha Man	Voice

== Audio ==
Year	Title	Role	Notes	Ref(s)
2021	The Coldest Case	Billy Harney	9 episodes	
2024	The Coldest Case: The Past Has A Long Memory	Billy Harney	8 episodes	

== Music videos ==
Year	Song	Artist	Role
2002	"Thoughtless"	Korn	Floyd Louis Cifer
2002	"Screaming Infidelities"	Dashboard Confessional	Ex-Boyfriend
2003	"White Trash Beautiful"	Everlast	Boyfriend
