= Dos Hombres =

Mezcal brand

- Logo
- Native name: Dos Hombres Mezcal
- Type: Private
- Founded: 2019
- Founders: Bryan Cranston, Aaron Paul
- Products: Mezcal
- Website: www.doshombres.com

Dos Hombres is a mezcal company co-founded in 2019 by American actors Bryan Cranston and Aaron Paul, who played lead characters Walter White and Jesse Pinkman, respectively, on the 2008–2013 crime drama series Breaking Bad. Dos Hombres means "two men" in Spanish.

In June 2021, Constellation Brands took a minority stake in Dos Hombres through its venture capital group, though Dos Hombres remains independently owned and operated.

The company produces artisanal mezcal, which is distilled in small batches and does not use modern technology. Dos Hombres is produced in San Luis del Río in Oaxaca, Mexico, and production is led by Gregorio Velasco.

== Products ==
Dos Hombres Espadin is made with Agave Espadin in San Luis del Rio, Oaxaca, Mexico. Its alcohol content is 42%. Dos Hombres Tobala is made with maguey tobala (Agave potatorum) in San Luis del Rio. The product's alcohol content is 45%.

== See also ==
- "Celebrity Booze: The Ultimate Cash Grab", an episode of It's Always Sunny in Philadelphia about Dos Hombres
