= The Gang Gets Cursed =

- It's Always Sunny in Philadelphia episode
- Episode no.: Season 16; Episode 3
- Directed by: Richie Keen
- Written by: David Hornsby
- Cinematography by: John Tanzer
- Editing by: Josh Drisko; Mallory Yarnall
- Production code: XIP16003
- Original air date: June 14, 2023
- Running time: 22 minutes

Guest appearances
- Rhea Perlman as Bertha Fussy; David Hornsby as Cricket; Lynne Marie Stewart as Bonnie Kelly; Sandy Martin as Mrs. Mac; Andrew Friedman as Uncle Jack; Chase Utley as himself; CJ Hoff as The Kid

Episode chronology
← Previous "Frank Shoots Every Member of the Gang"	Next → "Frank vs. Russia"
- It's Always Sunny in Philadelphia season 16

"The Gang Gets Cursed" is the third episode of the sixteenth season of the American sitcom television series It's Always Sunny in Philadelphia. It is the 165th overall episode of the series and was written by executive producer David Hornsby and directed by Richie Keen. It originally aired on FXX on June 14, 2023.

The series follows "The Gang", a group of five misfit friends: twins Dennis and Deandra "(Sweet) Dee" Reynolds, their friends Charlie Kelly and Ronald "Mac" McDonald, and Frank Reynolds, Dennis' and Dee's legal father. The Gang runs the fictional Paddy's Pub, an unsuccessful Irish bar in South Philadelphia. In the episode, the Gang is set to be featured in Bar Rescue, but strange events lead to a potential curse placed on them.

According to Nielsen Media Research, the episode was seen by an estimated 0.279 million household viewers and gained a 0.13 ratings share among adults aged 18–49. The episode received very positive reviews from critics, who praised the humor, guest performances and callbacks to previous season.

== Plot ==
Paddy's Pub is selected to appear in an episode of Bar Rescue. Mac (Rob McElhenney) is enthusiastic, but the rest of the Gang are not, as they despise reality television. Mac reaffirms that their luck will favor them.

The next day, strange events start happening: Dee (Kaitlin Olson) wakes up with Bell's palsy, Dennis (Glenn Howerton) is unable to fully express his thoughts, and Frank (Danny DeVito) finds blood in his egg. Despite Mac's insistence that they are fine, Charlie (Charlie Day) believes they were cursed. Among many things that may have contributed include Dee insulting her neighbor, Bertha Fussy (Rhea Perlman); Frank killing a seagull who entered the bar; and Cricket (David Hornsby) literally cursing Mac for his mistreatment. Charlie advises them to fix their mistakes and avoid bad luck.

Dennis has Dee apologize to Bertha, although he is more interested in retrieving a trophy she gave away. A black cat crosses their path, disturbing Dennis. Bertha then states that she had a black cat named Maureen that died, making Dennis alarmed at remembering Maureen Ponderosa. Mac apologizes to Cricket, who lifts his curse. Mac starts using a monkey's paw for good luck, getting to finally meet Chase Utley. However, Utley only agreed to meet him to catch baseball with his "dying son", so Mac tries to find a kid to pretend to be his. Charlie asks Bonnie (Lynne Marie Stewart) about Frank's curse, and she suggests that he should give the seagull a proper burial since it could possess the spirit of a sailor.

Dennis returns to the bar, revealing that he kept Maureen's ashes in an urn. Her will asked for Dennis to bury her in a pet cemetery, which he refused, but believe this may be his curse. After failing to find a kid, Mac reveals to the Gang that his monkey paw was found from a dead monkey, whose corpse is still in the pub. (Note: The same monkey who robbed them in "The Gang Replaces Dee With a Monkey".) To fix everything, Charlie gets the gang to bury the seagull, the monkey, and Maureen's ashes in the pet cemetery, making it appear that it was Mac's son. When Utley asks Mac about his son, he reveals that he lied and believes in superstitions. To his surprise, Utley states that baseball is based on superstitions. He then steals Mac's monkey paw and flees from the cemetery. Dennis then realizes that his and Dee's conditions are the product of mold and Frank's egg was actually a seagull's egg. Mac is also informed that Bar Rescue has rescinded their offer after no one was present at the pub, making him think they are still cursed. Dennis states there is no bad luck happening to them. When Cricket asks about his bad luck, Frank plainly states that he was born under a cloud and that's just how it will always be for him.

== Production ==
=== Development ===
In May 2023, FXX reported that the third episode of the sixteenth season would be titled "The Gang Gets Cursed", and was to be directed by Richie Keen and written by executive producer David Hornsby. This was Keen's 15th directing credit, and Hornsby's 33rd writing credit.

=== Casting ===
In February 2023, Rob McElhenney teased that Chase Utley would return as a guest star for the series, having previously appeared in the sixth season's episode, "The Gang Gets Stranded in the Woods". Danny DeVito's real-life spouse, Rhea Perlman, also guest stars in the episode.

== Reception ==
=== Viewers ===
In its original American broadcast, "The Gang Gets Cursed" was seen by an estimated 0.279 million household viewers and gained a 0.13 ratings share among adults aged 18–49, according to Nielsen Media Research. This means that 0.13 percent of all households with televisions watched the episode. This was a 29% increase in viewership from the previous episode, which was watched by 0.216 million viewers with a 0.09 in the 18-49 demographics.

=== Critical reviews ===
"The Gang Gets Cursed" received very positive reviews from critics. Ray Flook of Bleeding Cool gave the episode an 8.5 out of 10 rating and wrote, "There is no other sitcom out there that could tackle the heavy topic of faith vs. fact and how, even in the face of what we know is common sense, we will still lean on our superstitions for comfort. And that sometimes those very same superstitions can be our own worst enemy."

Michael Boyle of /Film praised Mac's storyline, writing, "It's possible that Utley's Hall of Fame ambitions won't go as smoothly as he hopes, and he might be unfortunate enough to cross paths with Mac yet again. Mac might not have achieved his lifelong dream, but if he plays his cards right, he might still get another shot." Rendy Jones of Paste praised the use of returning characters, writing, "You can sense how everyone in the show heavily missed their presence, and they make up for it by giving them ample screen time in multiple episodes. Even Rickety Cricket gets some time in the sun in the episode 'The Gang Gets Cursed', which Hornsby penned." Emily Zemler of The New York Observer considered the batch of episodes as "slightly more hit or miss", but highlighted the return of Chase Utley and Jack Kelly.
