= Frank vs. Russia =

- It's Always Sunny in Philadelphia episode
- Episode no.: Season 16; Episode 4
- Directed by: Heath Cullens
- Written by: Megan Ganz
- Cinematography by: John Tanzer
- Editing by: Scott Draper
- Production code: XIP16002
- Original air date: June 21, 2023
- Running time: 21 minutes

Guest appearances
- Lynne Marie Stewart as Bonnie Kelly; Sandy Martin as Mrs. Mac; Andrew Friedman as Jack Kelly

Episode chronology
← Previous "The Gang Gets Cursed"	Next → "Celebrity Booze: The Ultimate Cash Grab"
- It's Always Sunny in Philadelphia season 16

"Frank vs. Russia" is the fourth episode of the sixteenth season of the American sitcom television series It's Always Sunny in Philadelphia. It is the 166th overall episode of the series and was written by executive producer Megan Ganz and directed by co-executive producer Heath Cullens. It originally aired on FXX on June 21, 2023.

The series follows "The Gang", a group of five misfit friends: twins Dennis and Deandra "(Sweet) Dee" Reynolds, their friends Charlie Kelly and Ronald "Mac" McDonald, and Frank Reynolds, Dennis' and Dee's legal father. The Gang runs the fictional Paddy's Pub, an unsuccessful Irish bar in South Philadelphia. In the episode, Charlie gets Frank to participate in a local chess competition, while Dennis helps Mac and Dee with their dates.

According to Nielsen Media Research, the episode was seen by an estimated 0.205 million household viewers and gained a 0.09 ratings share among adults aged 18–49. The episode received critical acclaim, with critics praising the humor, performances and callbacks to previous episodes.

== Plot ==
Charlie (Charlie Day) awakens Frank (Danny DeVito) from his sleep, taking him to a televised chess competition. Frank recognizes his rival (Endre Hules) as he prepares to face him.

Two days earlier, Charlie signs Frank into a televised chess competition, where a Russian Grandmaster will participate. To cheat their way to the top, they seek the help of Jack Kelly (Andrew Friedman), who provides them with camera glasses and a buzzer to fully watch the matches from an ice cream truck and tell their moves. Meanwhile, Dee (Kaitlin Olson) and Mac (Rob McElhenney) are having trouble in dating men. Frustrated, Dennis (Glenn Howerton) decides to help them with a new system he implemented to help them, called "The S.I.N.N.E.D. System" (a reversed version of "The D.E.N.N.I.S. System"). The system proves to be successful for both Mac and Dee, although the aftermaths prove to be a mixed bag when they deviate from his plans.

Frank reaches the finals, but Charlie realizes that security will search Frank before the match and find the buzzer. Charlie asks Dennis for his help. Realizing that he can use Frank as his pawn, Dennis agrees. At the match, Dennis uses anal beads controlled from an app on his phone to inform Frank about the right move, warning him from the ice cream truck. With this, Frank manages to advance in the match, although he experiences distracting pleasure. When Mac interrupts him to question about his date "Johnny" (actually Dennis, whom Mac refuses to believe is fake), Dennis reveals that he has his date's DMs on his phone, and believing Dennis "stole Johnny's phone", Mac attempts to take it from him. In their struggle, they accidentally throw the phone outside, breaking it and setting the beads' vibration level to "full blast." Frank makes a random final move, which surprisingly renders him victorious. As Frank is deemed the champion, Charlie enters to embrace Frank, who is writhing on the floor as the beads are still activated.

== Production ==
=== Development ===
In May 2023, FXX reported that the fourth episode of the sixteenth season would be titled "Frank vs. Russia", and was to be directed by co-executive producer Heath Cullens and written by executive producer Megan Ganz. This was Cullens' 12th directing credit, and Ganz's seventh writing credit.

=== Writing ===
The episode brings back the concept of "The D.E.N.N.I.S. System", which was introduced back in the fifth season. For the episode, it was re-introduced as "The S.I.N.N.E.D. System", with the acronym being "DENNIS" backwards.

The episode makes references to two real-world chess disputes: the first is the American versus Russian narrative, referencing a Cold War rivalry match between Bobby Fischer and Boris Spassky in the World Chess Championship 1972, and the second was the recent cheating scandal of Carlsen–Niemann controversy where Magnus Carlsen implicitly accused Hans Niemann of cheating in 2022.

== Reception ==
=== Viewers ===
In its original American broadcast, "Frank vs. Russia" was seen by an estimated 0.205 million household viewers and gained a 0.09 ratings share among adults aged 18–49, according to Nielsen Media Research. This means that 0.09 percent of all households with televisions watched the episode. This was a 27% decrease in viewership from the previous episode, which was watched by 0.279 million viewers with a 0.13 in the 18-49 demographics.

=== Critical reviews ===
"Frank vs. Russia" received critical acclaim. Ray Flook of Bleeding Cool gave the episode a 9 out of 10 rating and wrote, "the important takeaway from this episode was how it continued expanding the show's universe while also offering meaningful callbacks to the show's canon. As a fan since the first episode, it feels like there's been a concerted effort this season to reward us with some 'deep cut' callbacks and returns that don't feel forced or like fan-servicing."

Jerrica Tisdale of Telltale TV gave the episode a 4 star rating out of 5 rating and wrote, "Overall, 'Frank vs. Russia' adds another very funny entry into the season 16 catalog. It's the clever recycling of their old gags and on-going storylines that make it work. It's also commitment to a bit, and psychotic Dennis is always the best Dennis." Danielle Ryan of /Film praised the episode's return to the D.E.N.N.I.S. System, writing, "It's Always Sunny in Philadelphia is revisiting some of its greatest hits and deepest cuts in season 16, but they're clearly having a blast turning things on their heads. They did follow-ups to both 'Chardee Macdennis: The Game of Games' and 'The Gang Beats Boggs,' so why not revisit 'The DENNIS System' and make it new? I can't wait to see what they do with the rest of the season."

Rendy Jones of Paste praised the episode's callbacks, "it references some of its most notable moments in passing and then does a hilarious 180 on them (within 30 seconds of saying he 'got the gay thing,' Frank retracts his statement due to Mac sharing a bizarre dating habit). On any other occasion, it's frustrating to see characters regress. When the Sunny gang does it, it's fitting. It's like expecting The Three Stooges to not poke each other in the eyes. It's simply not going to happen. If characters aren't doing sudden reversals, they instead further develop several series-high moments, such as Dennis' dating system making its long-awaited return." Austen Goslin of Polygon wrote, "More importantly, it serves as a fantastic reminder that whether they're pulling a story directly from internet speculation about international sports, or playing their own greatest hits in reverse the gang's still got it, even 16 seasons later."
