= The Gang Goes Bowling =

- It's Always Sunny in Philadelphia episode
- Episode no.: Season 16; Episode 7
- Directed by: Megan Ganz
- Written by: Rob McElhenney; Charlie Day; Glenn Howerton
- Cinematography by: John Tanzer
- Editing by: Josh Drisko
- Production code: XIP16005
- Original air date: July 12, 2023
- Running time: 22 minutes

Guest appearances
- Mary Elizabeth Ellis as Waitress; Artemis Pebdani as Artemis; Mary Lynn Rajskub as Gail the Snail; Jimmi Simpson as Liam McPoyle; Nate Mooney as Ryan McPoyle

Episode chronology
← Previous "Risk E. Rat's Pizza and Amusement Center"	Next → "Dennis Takes a Mental Health Day"
- It's Always Sunny in Philadelphia season 16

"The Gang Goes Bowling" is the seventh and penultimate episode of the sixteenth season of the American sitcom television series It's Always Sunny in Philadelphia. It is the 169th overall episode of the series and was written by series creators, executive producers and main actors Rob McElhenney, Charlie Day and Glenn Howerton, and directed by executive producer Megan Ganz. It originally aired on FXX on July 12, 2023.

The series follows "The Gang", a group of five misfit friends: twins Dennis and Deandra "(Sweet) Dee" Reynolds, their friends Charlie Kelly and Ronald "Mac" McDonald, and Frank Reynolds, Dennis' and Dee's legal father. The Gang runs the fictional Paddy's Pub, an unsuccessful Irish bar in South Philadelphia. In the episode, Dee joins The Waitress, Artemis and Gail the Snail in their bowling team, only to be challenged by Dennis, Charlie, Mac and Frank in a game.

According to Nielsen Media Research, the episode was seen by an estimated 0.262 million household viewers and gained a 0.13 ratings share among adults aged 18–49. The episode received extremely positive reviews from critics, who praised the humor, return of characters and references.

== Plot ==
Dee (Kaitlin Olson) asks Dennis (Glenn Howerton) for money, despite not working through the day. When the Gang questions her about her motives, she finally reveals that she is going out bowling with some friends of hers. After she leaves, the rest of the Gang declares they would not waste their time going bowling.

At the bowling alley, Dee meets with her team, which consists of The Waitress (Mary Elizabeth Ellis), Artemis (Artemis Pebdani), and Gail the Snail (Mary Lynn Rajskub). They did not want Dee on their team, but their fourth required member dropped out. Suddenly, Charlie (Charlie Day), Dennis, Mac (Rob McElhenney), and Frank (Danny DeVito) arrive, intending to fend off the girls in a girls vs boys league. They visit the alley owners, which are revealed to be Liam and Ryan McPoyle (Jimmi Simpson and Nate Mooney), who bought the place after a financial turmoil. After paying a fee, they allow them to play in the league.

The first round starts with the boys all achieving strikes, while the girls struggle in competing. After Dennis mocks the girls, Dee decides to employ a new strategy, which will involve manipulating the boys for their stupidity. This gets them to almost match their score in the following rounds. When Dennis mocks Dee again, The Waitress challenges him to an arcade game to prove his test of strength by punching a ball. The Waitress delivers a kick that gives her points, but Dennis' punch hits the limit of the score, earning him the win. However, the punch was strong enough to break his bones and he cannot bowl on the final game against Dee. He convinces Liam to bowl for him, while Dee gets Ryan to bowl for her team. During his turn, Liam cannot see the pins due to his blurred vision and accidentally hits Ryan's hand with a ball, causing both to drop out and Dennis and Dee having to play. Dee finally overcomes her mockery and manages to strike one pin, winning. However, she notes that everyone left and The Waitress admits she is not interested in their win as she doesn't care about women's sports.

== Production ==
=== Development ===
In June 2023, FXX reported that the seventh episode of the sixteenth season would be titled "The Gang Goes Bowling", and was to be directed by executive producer Megan Ganz, and written by series creators, executive producers and main actors Rob McElhenney, Charlie Day and Glenn Howerton. This was Ganz's fourth directing credit, McElhenney's 58th writing credit, Day's 64th writing credit, and Howerton's 46th writing credit.

=== Casting ===
The episode featured the return of many characters, including Liam and Ryan McPoyle, last seen in the ninth season episode "The Gang Squashes Their Beefs". Artemis and The Waitress previously appeared in the fifteenth season, while Gail the Snail in the thirteenth season episode "The Gang Beats Boggs: Ladies Reboot".

=== Filming ===
The episode started filming in February 2023, with confirmation of the guest stars in the episode. Due to its bowling setting, the episode contained many references to the film The Big Lebowski.

== Reception ==
=== Viewers ===
In its original American broadcast, "The Gang Goes Bowling" was seen by an estimated 0.262 million household viewers and gained a 0.13 ratings share among adults aged 18–49, according to Nielsen Media Research. This means that 0.13 percent of all households with televisions watched the episode. This was a 12% increase in viewership from the previous episode, which was watched by 0.232 million viewers with a 0.09 in the 18-49 demographics.

=== Critical reviews ===
"The Gang Goes Bowling" received extremely positive reviews from critics. Ray Flook of Bleeding Cool gave the episode a 9 out of 10 rating and wrote, "Not many shows would be looking to further embrace their canon after five seasons, let alone 16 seasons. But Always Sunny is showing the confidence that comes from being the best sitcom running to give some amazing folks some additional screen time. And that made for an episode that pull punches when it came to the humor, yet still left us feeling like… well, like we were home. A very fucked-up, dysfunctional, probably-could-use-therapy home... but a home nonetheless."

Jerrica Tisdale of Telltale TV gave the episode a 4 star rating out of 5 rating and wrote, "'The Gang Goes Bowling' is a good It's Always Sunny in Philadelphia episode that showcases Dennis and Dee in a protagonist and antagonist way that is fun and brings back some familiar faces that we haven’t seen in a while. It could become a future Sunny classic." Danielle Ryan of /Film wrote, "The episode is a battle of the sexes, pitting the girls' bowling team against the boys', and it gives all of the wacky side characters a chance to go wild. With so many of the best of Always Sunny appearing in the episode, it doesn't really matter who wins the bowling match because we all win."
