= Frank Shoots Every Member of the Gang =

- It's Always Sunny in Philadelphia episode
- Episode no.: Season 16; Episode 2
- Directed by: Richie Keen
- Written by: Davis Kop
- Cinematography by: John Tanzer
- Editing by: Scott Draper
- Production code: XIP16004
- Original air date: June 7, 2023
- Running time: 22 minutes

Guest appearances
- Lynne Marie Stewart as Bonnie Kelly; Sandy Martin as Mrs. Mac; Gregory Scott Cummins as Donald McDonald; Olivia Cohen as Bunny Kelly; Isabella Cohen as Candy Kelly

Episode chronology
← Previous "The Gang Inflates"	Next → "The Gang Gets Cursed"
- It's Always Sunny in Philadelphia season 16

"Frank Shoots Every Member of the Gang" is the second episode of the sixteenth season of the American sitcom television series It's Always Sunny in Philadelphia. It is the 164th overall episode of the series and was written by writer's assistant Davis Kop and directed by Richie Keen. It originally aired on FXX on June 7, 2023, airing back-to-back with the previous episode, "The Gang Inflates".

The series follows "The Gang", a group of five misfit friends: twins Dennis and Deandra "(Sweet) Dee" Reynolds, their friends Charlie Kelly and Ronald "Mac" McDonald, and Frank Reynolds, Dennis' and Dee's legal father. The Gang runs the fictional Paddy's Pub, an unsuccessful Irish bar in South Philadelphia. In the episode, Dennis and Dee try to get Frank's gun away from him, while Mac and Charlie travel with their mothers to claim their respective inheritances.

According to Nielsen Media Research, the episode was seen by an estimated 0.216 million household viewers and gained a 0.09 ratings share among adults aged 18–49. The episode received very positive reviews from critics, who praised the humor, performances and supporting cast.

== Plot ==
Dennis (Glenn Howerton) and Dee (Kaitlin Olson) dine with Frank (Danny DeVito) at a restaurant, where Frank uses his gun to try to open a can of anchovies, claiming that it is not loaded. After failing to talk to Frank about his fortune, they leave, but Frank's gun turns out to be loaded and he accidentally shoots Dee and Dennis in their cheeks.

Dennis and Dee express their concerns to Mac (Rob McElhenney) and Charlie (Charlie Day), explaining that they need to watch over Frank so he can rewrite their names into his will. Charlie then informs them that he will visit his family for an inheritance; a jar of teeth of his mother's side family in which they place them before dying, which he will inherit when he turns 40. This prompts Mac to ask his mother (Sandy Martin) about World War II letters that Mac's grandfather sent to his father, which may have value. While his mother confirms they exist, they are in possession of his uncle, Donald. When they visit Bonnie Kelly (Lynne Marie Stewart), she tells Charlie that she gave away the jar to Charlie's sisters in New Jersey. Mac and Charlie leave with their mothers to their respective destinations.

Dennis and Dee try to win over Frank by giving him "the perfect day", but Frank often uses his gun for everything. Their last stop is at Jersey Shore, where Frank thanks them for the day and tells him he will give them his money. However, Frank hands them his gun, telling him to kill him, which they refuse to do. Frank is angered to discover that they wanted to take away his gun and removes them from his will again. In New Jersey, Donald (Gregory Scott Cummins) provides the letters to Mac, and his attempts at reconnecting with his family are rejected. They arrive at the sisters' house, where they are revealed to be using the jar for ASMR, which made them rich. Mac is also annoyed to discover that his mother used the bathroom and cleaned herself with the letters, making them worthless. They return to the bar with Dennis, Dee and Frank, where Dennis goes on a tirade about their legacy. Frank then drops his gun on the counter, which fires and ricochets into Mac, Charlie and Frank's leg.

== Production ==
=== Development ===
In May 2023, it was reported that the second episode of the sixteenth season would be titled "Frank Shoots Every Member of the Gang", and was to be directed by Richie Keen and written by writer's assistant Davis Kop. This was Keen's 14th directing credit, and Kop's first writing credit. Twins Olivia and Isabella Cohen appear as Charlie's younger twin sisters Bunny and Candy Kelly, characters whose only other appearance was in the 2005 first season finale "Charlie Got Molested", eighteen years earlier.

=== Writing ===
Charlie's subplot was inspired by a story shared by Danny DeVito to the cast on their first meeting in the series. DeVito's father was said to have kept a box of teeth, which "also sometimes held wristwatches." The story was used for the series, with the box changed to a jar belonging to Charlie's family.

== Reception ==
=== Viewers ===
In its original American broadcast, "Frank Shoots Every Member of the Gang" was seen by an estimated 0.216 million household viewers and gained a 0.09 ratings share among adults aged 18–49, according to Nielsen Media Research. This means that 0.09 percent of all households with televisions watched the episode. This was a 30% decrease in viewership from the previous episode, which was watched by 0.305 million viewers with a 0.14 in the 18-49 demographics.

=== Critical reviews ===
"Frank Shoots Every Member of the Gang" received very positive reviews from critics. Ross Bonaime of Collider wrote, "in the second episode, 'Frank Shoots Every Member of the Gang,' Charlie, Mac, and their mothers go to meet Mac's uncle and Charlie’s sisters in order to gain pieces of their family's legacies. While it's always great spending time with these five, it's nice that this season tries to expand a bit more into the supporting characters that are equally fun to explore."

Emily Zemler of The New York Observer praised the premiere but considered the episode "slightly more hit or miss." Ray Flook of Bleeding Cool wrote, "These first two outings saw top-notch comedic writing & directing, supported by a cast that knows these characters better than most people know themselves." Jonah Krueger of Consequence wrote, "Even when episodes retread old ground, like 'Frank Shoots Every Member of the Gang' and its gun-centric commentary, the show still carries forward momentum."

Rendy Jones of Paste wrote, "'Frank Shoots Every Member of the Gang' once again has the gang ridiculing the — still too hot — subject of American gun control, or lack thereof. Both episodes are as funny as they are ingenious, establishing the rhythm for the rest of the season." Joel Keller of Decider wrote, "That episode was laugh-out-loud funny because of some of the more ridiculous, and disgusting, aspects of the story, like Charlie's mom crying while her mouth cascades blood; she pulled out her own tooth to try to make a new jar. There's also Mac's terse mother saying she has to 'smash' and keeping Mac quiet by putting out her cigarette on his knee. And the site of DeVito peeing on hydrants with his leg up will never not be funny."
