= Dennis Takes a Mental Health Day =

- It's Always Sunny in Philadelphia episode
- Episode no.: Season 16; Episode 8
- Directed by: Heath Cullens
- Written by: Ross Maloney
- Cinematography by: John Tanzer
- Editing by: Scott Draper
- Production code: XIP16008
- Original air date: July 19, 2023
- Running time: 23 minutes

Episode chronology
← Previous "The Gang Goes Bowling"	Next → "The Gang F***s Up Abbott Elementary"
- It's Always Sunny in Philadelphia season 16

"Dennis Takes a Mental Health Day" is the eighth episode and season finale of the sixteenth season of the American sitcom television series It's Always Sunny in Philadelphia. It is the 170th overall episode of the series and was written by associate producer Ross Maloney, and directed by co-executive producer Heath Cullens. It originally aired on FXX on July 19, 2023.

The series follows "The Gang", a group of five misfit friends: twins Dennis and Deandra "(Sweet) Dee" Reynolds, their friends Charlie Kelly and Ronald "Mac" McDonald, and Frank Reynolds, Dennis's and Dee's legal father. The Gang runs the fictional Paddy's Pub, an unsuccessful Irish bar in South Philadelphia. In the episode, Dennis decides to take a break from the Gang to control his blood pressure, but chaos soon ensues.

According to Nielsen Media Research, the episode was seen by an estimated 0.278 million household viewers and gained a 0.13 ratings share among adults aged 18–49. The episode received positive reviews from critics, who praised Glenn Howerton's performance, absurdity and twist ending.

== Plot ==
While undergoing a physical exam at his doctor's office, Dennis (Glenn Howerton) is surprised to learn he has high blood pressure. He rejects the doctor's recommendation of medication, insisting that he can command his body to lower his blood pressure and will take care of the problem on his own.

After a video call from the Gang raises his heart rate and blood pressure, Dennis decides to call a mental health day, during which he will go to the beach apart from the Gang. With his car in the shop, Dennis reserves a rental and ends up with a luxury electric vehicle started from an app on his phone, a feature he dislikes intensely. Stopping at a tea shop, Dennis is further aggravated at having to download another app to purchase his drink. After returning to his car, Dennis accidentally leaves his phone on the roof and drives away. Later on, while distracted by the car's warning about a missing 'key', Dennis runs a stop sign and is stopped by a police officer who forces him to exit the car, locking him out.

Dennis decides to buy a new phone, but learns that he can only get one immediately if he adds a new line to his family plan - which is under Frank's (Danny DeVito) name. Back at the bar, the Gang is attempting to make diamonds by adding charcoal to a pressure cooker. Dennis calls Frank to get the PIN for the family plan, but the Gang ignore the call noting Dennis's earlier call for a mental health day. He successfully guesses Frank's PIN and gets a new phone, only to find that the app will not connect to his car. After spending hours on the phone with the rental company and the car maker Dennis engages in an angry diatribe rehashing the futility of his struggle to a customer service representative, finally deciding to register his complaints with the CEO of the car company. Upon learning the CEO is away at his beach house, Dennis confronts him before silently reaching into the man's chest and removing his heart. Tightening his fist around the glowing heart, Dennis forms a diamond, which he then consumes.

The scene then transitions to the clinic, revealing the events were all a daydream. The doctor is astounded to see Dennis's blood pressure has lowered 20 points in less than a minute, and Dennis tells him he just "let off a little steam". Answering a call from Charlie (Charlie Day) about the pressure cooker, Dennis decides to join their scheme. A relaxed Dennis leaves the office, walking past several people in the clinic who were characters in his fantasy.

== Production ==
=== Development ===
In June 2023, FXX reported that the eighth episode of the sixteenth season would be titled "Dennis Takes a Mental Health Day", and was to be directed by co-executive producer Heath Cullens, and written by associate producer Ross Maloney. This was Cullens' 13th directing credit, and Maloney's first writing credit.

=== Writing ===
The episode was inspired by events in Glenn Howerton's life, who related an anecdote in which a weekend trip was ruined due to a malfunction between his phone and a Tesla Model X. He said, "I was in a rage but then something happened at a certain point where I just surrendered to the situation. And then all sorts of life lessons crept in over the course of the time that I was going through this ordeal."

== Reception ==
=== Viewers ===
In its original American broadcast, "Dennis Takes a Mental Health Day" was seen by an estimated 0.278 million household viewers and gained a 0.13 ratings share among adults aged 18–49, according to Nielsen Media Research. Meaning that 0.13 percent of all households with televisions watched the episode. This was a slight increase in viewership from the previous episode, which was watched by 0.262 million viewers with a 0.13 in the 18–49 demographics.

=== Critical reviews ===
"Dennis Takes a Mental Health Day" received positive reviews from critics. Ray Flook of Bleeding Cool wrote, "Wow! I actually didn't see that whole 'Keyser Söze' thing coming and that we would be taken all the way back to Dennis' initial doctor's visit. That might be one of the best insights into how Dennis' mind works since 'Making Dennis Reynolds a Murderer' and a highly creative note to end the season on."

Jerrica Tisdale of Tell-Tale TV gave the episode a 4-star rating out of 5 and wrote, "'Dennis Takes a Mental Health Day' is a brilliant character study that also demonstrates just how annoying everyday life is." Danielle Ryan of /Film wrote, "The characters and situations on It's Always Sunny in Philadelphia may seem too ridiculous to ever be real, but it turns out that sometimes truth and fiction aren't all that different." Jamie Parker of Comic Book Resources praised the episode's themes, saying "'Dennis Takes A Mental Health Day' not only shines a light on the rising need for mental health days and work life balance, but also the dangers of technology. Dennis takes on cars, coffee shops, and tech corporations in his fight for mental relaxation and rejuvenation."
