= Risk E. Rat's Pizza & Amusement Center =

- It's Always Sunny in Philadelphia episode
- Episode no.: Season 16; Episode 6
- Directed by: Nina Pedrad
- Written by: Rob Rosell
- Cinematography by: John Tanzer
- Editing by: Josh Drisko
- Production code: XIP16007
- Original air date: July 5, 2023
- Running time: 21 minutes

Guest appearances
- Ian Sharkey as Sam; H. Michael Croner as Dog; Curry Barker as Joey

Episode chronology
← Previous "Celebrity Booze: The Ultimate Cash Grab"	Next → "The Gang Goes Bowling"
- It's Always Sunny in Philadelphia season 16

"Risk E. Rat's Pizza and Amusement Center" is the sixth episode of the sixteenth season of the American sitcom television series It's Always Sunny in Philadelphia. It is the 168th overall episode of the series and was written by executive producer Rob Rosell, and directed by co-executive producer Nina Pedrad. It originally aired on FXX on July 5, 2023.

The series follows "The Gang", a group of five misfit friends: twins Dennis and Deandra "(Sweet) Dee" Reynolds, their friends Charlie Kelly and Ronald "Mac" McDonald, and Frank Reynolds, Dennis' and Dee's legal father. The Gang runs the fictional Paddy's Pub, an unsuccessful Irish bar in South Philadelphia. In the episode, the Gang visits Risk E. Rat's, a family entertainment center from their childhood, only to discover that a lot has changed since then.

According to Nielsen Media Research, the episode was seen by an estimated 0.232 million household viewers and gained a 0.09 ratings share among adults aged 18–49. The episode received mostly positive reviews from critics, who praised the humor and themes, although its social commentary polarized critics.

== Plot ==
The Gang visits Risk E. Rat's, a family entertainment center they used to visit when they were kids. During the journey, Charlie (Charlie Day) confesses that he saw breasts for the first time when he accidentally stumbled upon Justine the Teen Dream, an animatronic, which interests Dennis (Glenn Howerton).

At Risk E. Rat's, they are forced to sign waivers before entering. Mac (Rob McElhenney) intends to redeem his old tickets, but is disappointed to discover that the old items (such as toy guns, super sour candy, and candy cigarettes) have been discontinued due to health and safety concerns. Charlie and Dennis also discover that the animatronics' section was closed and will instead form a new superstore, prompting them to start hitting the wall to bring it down. Frank (Danny DeVito) and Dee (Kaitlin Olson) start a "joke hunt", in which they will try to find clues and possibly meet the mascot, Risk E. However, they are also disappointed to see that many of the characters have changed in name and personality (Dingbat Duck, for example, has changed into Dapper Duck due to concerns that Dingbat Duck was mocking those with intellectual disabilities) and the jokes are family-friendly puns instead of insults against other people.

After breaking the wall, Charlie and Dennis find the warehouse where the animatronics are kept. As they go through the old animatronics, they discover that some of them had to be rightfully retired, such as Greaseball the Italian Chef and a purple monster who was voiced by a white man who played the monster as African-American, due to concerns over racism. The two finally find Justine the Teen Dream, but are dismayed to discover that her breasts have been removed (so as not to sexualize teenage girls, though Dennis and Charlie blame it on both liberals and conservatives having their own issues with women's bodies in general). Mac gets into an argument with a kid, prompting a costumed employee to give them a therapy session. Mac does not feel "punished" enough and suggests the kid needs to experience bad events in order to make it out. The Gang reunites for a stage show with the animatronics, lamenting the amount of changes to the place. When the lyrics to the song prove to have changed (with the last straw being Risk E. Rat now being known as "RobbiePizza.com"), the Gang decides to recreate the original show to show today's parents and kids that what they grew up with was better. They take the animatronics out of the warehouse and convince parents to visit an area for their stage show. As the parents are allowed to enter, Frank turns on the switch, which causes a fire. As the firefighters and ambulances tend to the mass hysteria (with one parent outing The Gang for causing the fire), the Gang notes that the waivers prevent any potential lawsuit and leave before any questioning.

== Production ==
=== Development ===
In June 2023, FXX reported that the sixth episode of the sixteenth season would be titled "Risk E. Rat's Pizza and Amusement Center", and was to be directed by co-executive producer Nina Pedrad, and written by executive producer Rob Rosell. This was Pedrad's first directing credit, and Rosell's 26th writing credit.

== Reception ==
=== Viewers ===
In its original American broadcast, "Risk E. Rat's Pizza and Amusement Center" was seen by an estimated 0.232 million household viewers and gained a 0.09 ratings share among adults aged 18–49, according to Nielsen Media Research. This means that 0.09 percent of all households with televisions watched the episode. This was a 13% decrease in viewership from the previous episode, which was watched by 0.268 million viewers with a 0.13 in the 18-49 demographics.

=== Critical reviews ===
"Risk E. Rat's Pizza and Amusement Center" received mostly positive reviews from critics. Ray Flook of Bleeding Cool wrote, "you know that 'Risk E. Rat's Pizza & Amusement Center' has all of the makings of a truly & wonderfully inappropriate gem. They had me hooked with The Gang finding their old 'Chuck E. Cheese'-like stomping grounds becoming a little too soft and safe for their liking."

Jerrica Tisdale of Telltale TV gave the episode a 3.5 star rating out of 5 rating and wrote, "It's Always Sunny in Philadelphia is at its best when its humor matches its level of intelligent commentary. 'Risk E. Rat’s Pizza and Amusement Center' seems to sacrifice some comedy in honor of the punchy commentary." Michael Boyle of /Film wrote, "This latest 'Risk E Rat's' episode follows along the gang's time-honored tradition of willful delusion. Its conclusion, with the gang inadvertently traumatizing the kids and then refusing to take responsibility for it, only confirms that this tradition's not going to end any time soon. Every main character here has had a terrible childhood, but that's never going to stop them from remembering it fondly."

Rendy Jones of Paste wrote, "The gang's havoc in the restaurant is a direct mirror of its product-of-its-time offensive humor during its early years — using ableist slurs, doing racist accents, etc. — and exploring how their values have changed. Or, at the very least, what these characters can comprehend. It's typical Sunny-styled provocativeness that's also extremely funny." Ross Bonaime of Collider wrote, "That sort of toxic nostalgia and the breaking down of how the 'things used to be better in my day' mentality is a great example of It's Always Sunny commenting on our current society in a fun way that also manages to be prescient."
