= Celebrity Booze: The Ultimate Cash Grab =

- It's Always Sunny in Philadelphia episode
- Episode no.: Season 16; Episode 5
- Directed by: Megan Ganz
- Written by: Rob McElhenney; Charlie Day; Glenn Howerton
- Cinematography by: John Tanzer
- Editing by: Scott Draper
- Production code: XIP16006
- Original air date: June 28, 2023
- Running time: 21 minutes

Guest appearances
- Bryan Cranston as himself (special guest star); Aaron Paul as himself (special guest star); Ross Kimball as Limo Driver

Episode chronology
← Previous "Frank vs. Russia"	Next → "Risk E. Rat's Pizza and Amusement Center"
- It's Always Sunny in Philadelphia season 16

"Celebrity Booze: The Ultimate Cash Grab" is the fifth episode of the sixteenth season of the American sitcom television series It's Always Sunny in Philadelphia. It is the 167th overall episode of the series and was written by executive producers and series developers Rob McElhenney, Charlie Day, and Glenn Howerton, and directed by executive producer Megan Ganz. It originally aired on FXX on June 28, 2023.

The series follows "The Gang", a group of five misfit friends: twins Dennis and Deandra "(Sweet) Dee" Reynolds, their friends Charlie Kelly and Ronald "Mac" McDonald, and Frank Reynolds, Dennis' and Dee's legal father. The Gang runs the fictional Paddy's Pub, an unsuccessful Irish bar in South Philadelphia. In the episode, the Gang tries to get Malcolm in the Middle stars "Mr. Middle" and "Malcolm" (actually Breaking Bad stars Bryan Cranston and Aaron Paul) involved in their new alcohol brand.

According to Nielsen Media Research, the episode was seen by an estimated 0.268 million household viewers and gained a 0.13 ratings share among adults aged 18–49. The episode received mostly positive reviews from critics, who praised the guest appearances by Cranston and Paul, humor and absurdity.

== Plot ==
Actors Bryan Cranston and Aaron Paul visit Philadelphia to promote their alcohol brand. Charlie (Charlie Day), Mac (Rob McElhenney) and Dennis (Glenn Howerton), viewing celebrities using their faces to sell brands as a cashgrab, decide to create their own "premium alcohol brand" blending Goldschläger with other liquors. Charlie's idea to infuse their drink with nickels is angrily shot down by Dennis and Mac, but Charlie pursues the recipe on his own.

Meanwhile, Frank (Danny DeVito) is on his private plane with Dee (Kaitlin Olson), circling Philadelphia as part of a tax scheme. Dennis calls Frank to ask for funding; having recognized Cranston only from Malcolm in the Middle and mistaking Paul for a grown-up Frankie Muniz, Dennis promises to obtain the celebrities' endorsements. Frank okays the plan if he can meet them. At a promotional meet-and-greet, Mac and Dennis try to convince Cranston and Paul to sign with them, but their intentions are not clear and the actors leave without any confirmation. They decide to abandon their plan and try to convince Jalen Hurts, but they only run into Gritty and leave in frustration.

Having set off the metal detector at the event, Charlie stays outside to vomit the many nickels he gulped down. After vomiting on a limo driver, Charlie steals the limo and drives a departing Cranston and Paul to Frank's plane. Paul is demanding and dominant over the sheepish Cranston, and reveals that the latter lost his fortune due to a gambling addiction. On the plane, the entire gang tries to converse with Cranston and Paul, panicking them. Seemingly fed up with Paul telling him what to do, Cranston delivers a speech channeling Walter White that expresses his displeasure with the business and how everything wrong will be Paul's fault; this monologue, however, turns out to be an improvised acting showcase. When asked if they want to invest, Cranston and Paul bluntly refuse and demand to leave.

== Production ==
=== Development ===
In May 2023, FXX reported that the fifth episode of the sixteenth season would be titled "Celebrity Booze: The Ultimate Cash Grab", and was to be directed by executive producer Megan Ganz, and written by executive producers and series developers Rob McElhenney, Charlie Day and Glenn Howerton. This was Ganz's third directing credit, McElhenney's 57th writing credit, Day's 63rd writing credit, and Howerton's 45th writing credit.

=== Casting ===
The episode features guest appearances by Bryan Cranston and Aaron Paul, both playing themselves, with their roles revealed in the trailer for the season. The episode also features an appearance by Gritty, the official mascot for the Philadelphia Flyers, which was teased by McElhenney in February 2023.

== Reception ==
=== Viewers ===
In its original American broadcast, "Celebrity Booze: The Ultimate Cash Grab" was seen by an estimated 0.268 million household viewers and gained a 0.13 ratings share among adults aged 18–49, according to Nielsen Media Research. This means that 0.13 percent of all households with televisions watched the episode. This was a 30% increase in viewership from the previous episode, which was watched by 0.205 million viewers with a 0.09 in the 18-49 demographics.

=== Critical reviews ===
"Celebrity Booze: The Ultimate Cash Grab" received mostly positive reviews from critics. Ray Flook of Bleeding Cool gave the episode an 8 out of 10 rating and wrote, "For some background, McElhenney, Howerton & Day have teamed up in real life on Four Walls Whiskey, and Cranston & Paul really are the ones behind the mezcal. That means we have McElhenney, Howerton, Day, Cranston & Paul going the self-deprecating meta route to have some twisting the knife on celebrities who slap their names on a bottle, and suddenly they're in the alcohol business. It's a satire... that's also an ad... that was also a deeper examination of just how intoxicating fame and the power to influence others with it can be. And once again, Always Sunny proves that you can go deep without sacrificing the laughs – and being twistedly brilliant while sticking the landing."

Jerrica Tisdale of Telltale TV gave the episode a 4 star rating out of 5 rating and wrote, "Bryan Cranston and Aaron Paul take this episode near 4.5-star land, but if grading it overall, it loses some points because the gang’s storylines just don't deliver as much sharp comedy, or even extremely silly comedy, as It's Always Sunny in Philadelphia is capable of." Dianna Shen of Primetimer wrote, "Cranston and Paul's presence add a delightful layer of chaos into the mix. It might not be Breaking Bad (or even Malcolm in the Middle!), but it's always fun seeing outsiders interact with the gang."

Rendy Jones of Paste praised Cranston and Paul, writing, "As expected, Paul and Cranston are in on the fun and provide delightful performances worthy of a 'Best Guest Star in a Comedy Series' Emmy. Not to give too much of that episode away, but the starring duo cook up a fun fictional dynamic that fits the series' demented nature." Ross Bonaime of Collider considered the episode as "very much like old school It's Always Sunny in Philadelphia at its finest."
