= Karl Grell =

Austrian conductor and composer (1925–2003)

Karl Grell (5 September 1925 – 6 September 2003) was an Austrian composer and conductor.

== Life ==
Born in Vienna, Grell received violin lessons at the age of eight; at 14 he founded a dance band with school mates, one year later he started playing the clarinet. After graduating from high school and completing his military service from 1943 to 1945, he studied musicology at the University of Vienna and violin and clarinet, later composition at the Music and Arts University of the City of Vienna with Hugo Zelzer and conducting with Kurt Wöss.

In addition to his engagements as a violinist in various dance orchestras, from 1949 he worked as an arranger for the radio station Rot-Weiß-Rot. From 1954, he worked as a freelance programme designer for Radio Wien as well as assistant and arranger to Robert Stolz, for whom he arranged over 400 titles. Grell wrote a total of over 1600 arrangements.

In 1955, he founded the Wiener Solistenorchester for the Österreichischer Rundfunk, which he conducted for about 30 years. From 1971 to 1986, he was head of the department for entertainment and folk music at Radio Wien, from 1978 to 1990 permanent guest conductor of the RTV Orchestra of Radio Novi Sad. From 1990 to 1995, he was conductor of the newly founded Vienna Conservatory Orchestra (VCO).

Grell died in Vienna on 6 September 2003 at the age of 78 and was buried at the Hütteldorf cemetery (Group 2, Number G8).

In the Helmut-Qualtinger-Hof, in which Karl Grell lived, stands a memorial stone for him erected in 1958/59 according to the plans of Josef Schuster.

Grellgasse in the Vienna district of Floridsdorf was named after Karl Grell in accordance with the decision of the Vienna City Council Committee for Culture and Science of 1 March 2011.

Grell was married; his daughter Renate Grell-Sturm (born 1953) is a pianist.

== Awards ==
- 1975: bestowment of the professional title of Professor
- 1984: Austrian Decoration for Science and Art I. Klasse.
- 1991: Decoration of Honour for Services to the Republic of Austria.
- Ehrenmitglied und Ehrennadelträger des Österreichischer Komponistenbund.
