= Megan Ganz =

American writer (born 1984)

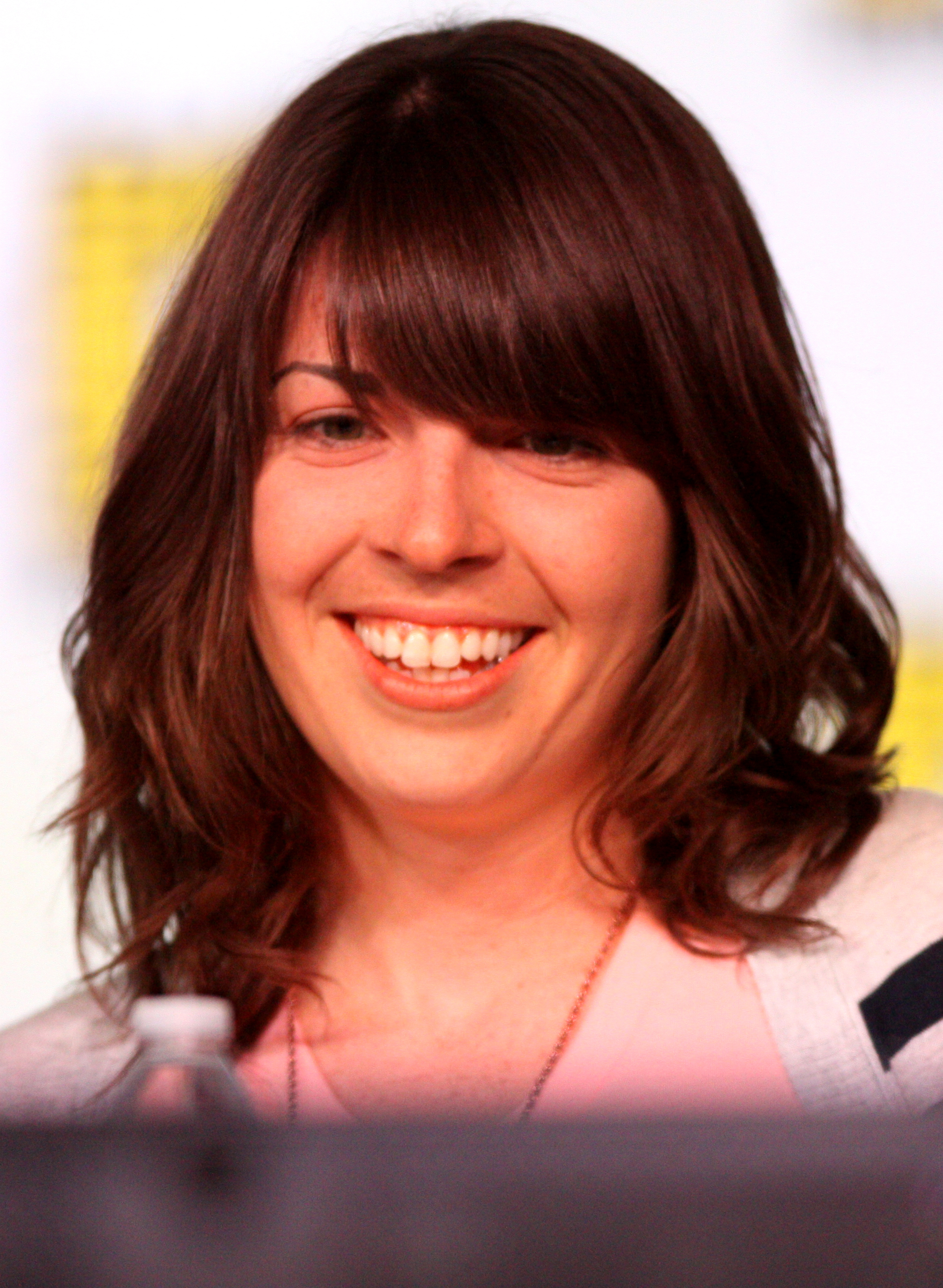
- Ganz at the 2012 Comic Con
- Born: Megan Ann Ganz; June 1, 1984 (age 42); Ann Arbor, Michigan, U.S.
- Education: University of Michigan
- Occupations: Writer; producer; director; podcaster
- Years active: 2006–present
- Spouse: Humphrey Ker (m. 2015)

Megan Ann Ganz (born June 1, 1984) is an American writer, producer, director, podcaster, and former associate editor of The Onion. She has been a writer and executive producer on the FXX series It's Always Sunny in Philadelphia since 2017. She previously wrote for the NBC series Community for three years from 2010 to 2013, and left to write for Modern Family from 2013 to 2015, where she won an Emmy. She also wrote for the Fox comedy series The Last Man on Earth, and co-created the Apple TV+ comedy series Mythic Quest alongside Rob McElhenney and Charlie Day.

== Early life and education ==
Ganz was born in Ann Arbor, Michigan. She was born at 4:20. Her father died when she was eight years old. She graduated from Hackett Catholic Central High School in Kalamazoo, Michigan in 2002.

In 2006, she graduated with honors from the University of Michigan, where she was editor-in-chief of The Every Three Weekly.

== Career ==
After completing her junior year at the university, she interned at Mad magazine in New York City. Ganz had planned to move back to Michigan after her internship was over, but Mad's editor-in-chief John Ficarra encouraged her to remain in New York and pursue comedy writing. She returned to New York and became assistant editor at The Onion and was later promoted to associate editor.

In 2008, Ganz was featured on an episode of This American Life along with other Onion staff members. An agent from United Talent Agency heard the broadcast and suggested that she move into television writing. In summer 2009, Ganz left her job at The Onion and moved to Los Angeles to become a writer for the Comedy Central sketch show Important Things with Demetri Martin.

In 2010, she began writing for the NBC comedy series Community. In 2013, after the shortened season 4 of Community had wrapped, Ganz joined the writing staff of the ABC series Modern Family. The show won the Emmy in 2014 for Outstanding Comedy Series with Ganz as the show's Supervising Producer. In 2015, Ganz created and produced an animated action-comedy pilot called Cassius and Clay which was expected to be paired with Archer on FXX, but the show never progressed beyond the pilot stage.

In 2016, Ganz announced on her Instagram that she had been hired as a writer for It's Always Sunny in Philadelphia, where she has since been promoted to executive producer and director for certain episodes. She also stars in, edits and produces the Always Sunny podcast, alongside Rob McElhenney, Glenn Howerton & Charlie Day.

In 2017, Ganz was a writer and co-executive producer for Fox sitcom, The Last Man on Earth (TV series).

In 2019, Apple TV+ announced Ganz as co-creator, along with Rob McElhenney and Charlie Day, of the new comedy series Mythic Quest, which premiered February 7, 2020 on the streaming platform.

In 2022, she worked as a story editor on the British All 4 series Don't Hug Me I'm Scared.

In 2023, Ganz was an executive producer on In These Cleats, a sports comedy podcast hosted by Paige Nielsen and Tien Tran focused on Women's soccer.

Ganz cites Dave Barry, Kaitlin Olson, Louis Sachar, Mad, Charles Schulz, and Bill Watterson as influences.

== Personal life ==
In 2018, during a Twitter exchange with Community creator and executive producer Dan Harmon, Ganz revealed Harmon engaged in inappropriate behavior toward her during their time on the show together. Harmon admitted his behavior on an episode of his podcast, Harmontown, in which he went into detail about his wrongdoings which included making advances on her and then mistreating her after she turned him down. Ganz said that she felt vindicated by the admission and accepted his apology, urging her Twitter followers to listen to this episode of Harmontown, and calling it a "master class in how to apologize", ultimately forgiving him. The exchange, the apology and Ganz's thoughts about them were covered in episode 674 of This American Life in which she was interviewed.

== Filmography ==
The following is a partial list of television episodes written or directed by Ganz.

=== Community ===
- 2.08 "Cooperative Calligraphy" (writer)
- 2.16 "Intermediate Documentary Filmmaking" (writer)
- 3.08 "Documentary Filmmaking: Redux" (writer)
- 3.17 "Basic Lupine Urology" (writer)
- 4.02 "Paranormal Parentage" (writer)
- 4.13 "Advanced Introduction to Finality" (writer)

=== Modern Family ===
- 5.09 "The Big Game" (writer)
- 5.17 "Other People's Children" (writer)
- 5.19 "A Hard Jay's Night" (co-writer)
- 5.24 "The Wedding (Part 2)" (co-writer)
- 6.02 "Do Not Push" (writer)
- 6.16 "Connection Lost" (co-writer)
- 6.23 "Crying Out Loud" (co-writer)

=== It's Always Sunny In Philadelphia ===
- 12.08 "The Gang Tends Bar" (writer)
- 13.02 "The Gang Escapes" (writer)
- 13.04 "Time's Up for the Gang" (writer)
- 14.03 "Dee Day" (writer)
- 14.06 "The Janitor Always Mops Twice" (writer)
- 15.05 "The Gang Goes to Ireland" (director)
- 15.06 "The Gang's Still in Ireland" (director)
- 15.08 "The Gang Carries a Corpse Up a Mountain" (writer)
- 16.04 "Frank vs. Russia" (writer)
- 16.05 "Celebrity Booze: The Ultimate Cash Grab" (director)
- 16.07 "The Gang Goes Bowling" (director)

=== The Last Man on Earth ===
- 4.02 "Stocko Syndome" (co-writer)
- 4.08 "Not Appropriate for Miners" (co-writer)
- 4.13 "Release the Hounds" (writer)

=== Mythic Quest ===
- 1.01 "Pilot" (co-writer)
- 1.03 "Dinner Party” (writer)
- 1.08 "Brendan" (writer)
- 1.09 "Blood Ocean" (co-writer)
- 1.10 "Quarantine" (co-writer)
- 2.01 "Titans' Rift" (co-writer)
- 2.02 "Grouchy Goat" (co-writer)
- 2.05 "Please Sign Here" (director)
- 2.08 "Juice Box" (co-writer)
- 3.01 "Across the Universe" (co-writer)
- 3.02 "Partners" (co-writer)
- 3.07 "Sarian" (co-director)
- 4.01 "Boundaries" (co-writer)
- 4.04 "The Villain's Feast" (director and co-writer)

== Awards and nominations ==
Ganz has been nominated for the Primetime Emmy Award for Outstanding Comedy Series for Modern Family twice, winning in 2014, and nominated in 2015.
