= David Hornsby =

American actor (born 1975)

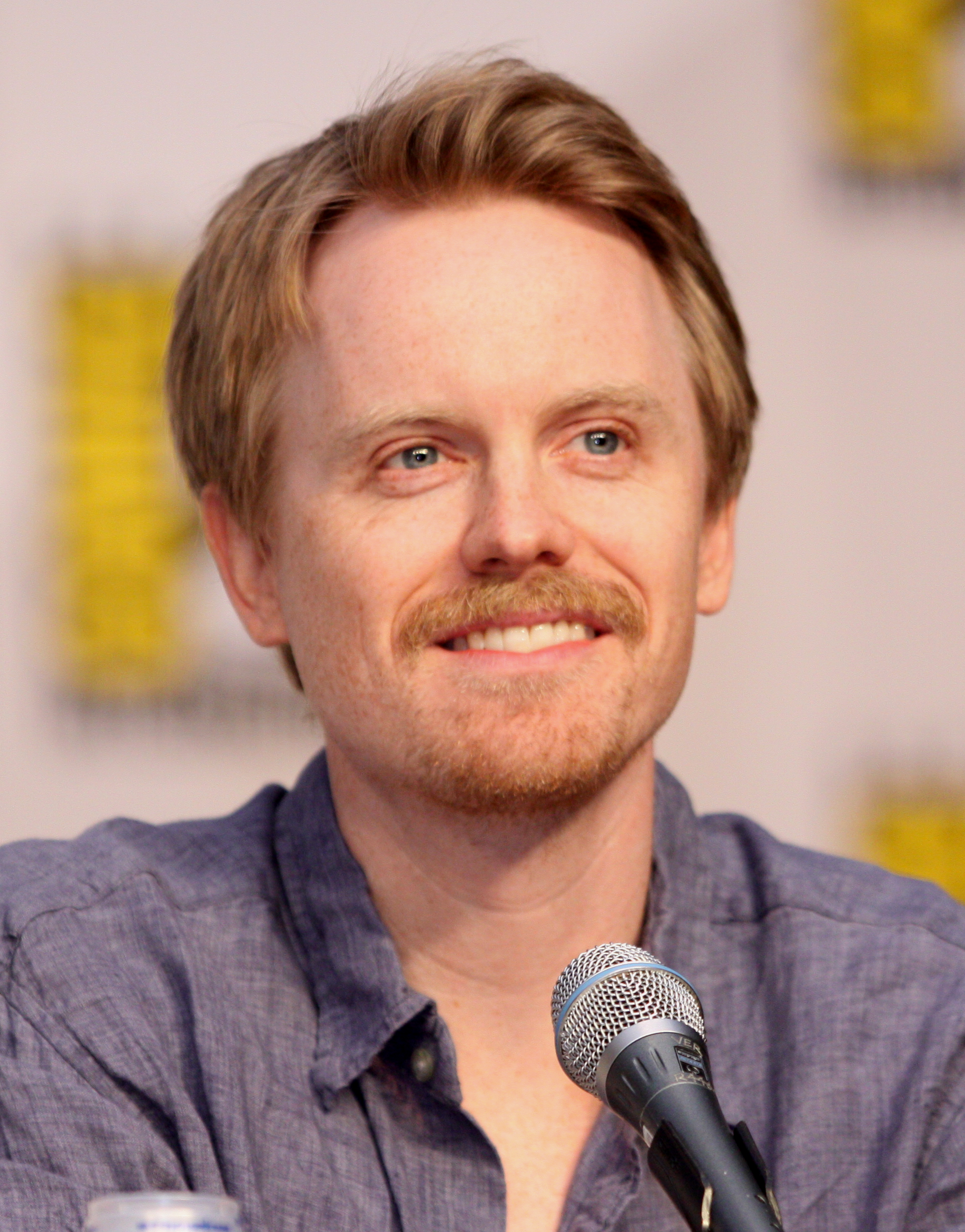
- Hornsby at San Diego Comic-Con, 2010
- Born: David Alan Hornsby; December 1, 1975 (age 50); Newport News, Virginia, U.S.
- Education: Carnegie Mellon University (BFA)
- Occupations: Actor; screenwriter; producer
- Years active: 1999–present
- Spouse: Emily Deschanel (m. 2010)
- Children: 2
- Relatives: Bruce Hornsby (cousin); Zooey Deschanel (sister-in-law)

David Alan Hornsby (born December 1, 1975) is an American actor. He is best known for his recurring role as defrocked priest Matthew "Rickety Cricket" Mara on the FX comedy series It's Always Sunny in Philadelphia, for which he also writes and produces. Hornsby had a regular role on the NBC comedy-crime series Good Girls (2018–2020). He was also the voice of the titular character Fanboy in the Nickelodeon animated TV series Fanboy & Chum Chum. Hornsby earned a Tony nomination for co-writing the musical adaptation of The Lost Boys, which opened on Broadway in April 2026.

== Early life ==
Hornsby was born in Newport News, Virginia, on December 1, 1975. He grew up in Houston, Texas, and majored in acting at Carnegie Mellon University. He is a cousin of musician Bruce Hornsby.

== Career ==
Hornsby plays defrocked priest Matthew "Rickety Cricket" Mara on the FX comedy series It's Always Sunny in Philadelphia, also serving as an executive producer and writer on the show. He appeared as Steve "The Hutch" Hutchinson on The Joe Schmo Show, and as Patrick on Six Feet Under. His first animated role was Fanboy in Fanboy & Chum Chum. He also starred in the independent film Pretty Bird.

Hornsby appeared in Pearl Harbor, Minority Report, and Flags of Our Fathers (in which he played USMC photographer Louis R. Lowery). He created and performed in the podcast Yoda and Me along with Loren Tarquinio. He adapted and created the CBS sitcom How to Be a Gentleman, serving as its lead actor, writer, and producer; CBS canceled the series in its first season. Hornsby co-wrote, designed characters, and lent his voice to FX's cartoon Unsupervised, which lasted for one season. Most recently, he created the NBC pilot for Mission Control, produced by Gary Sanchez Productions for NBC a workplace sitcom set at NASA's Johnson Space Center c. 1965.

Hornsby portrayed executive producer David Brittlesbee in Mythic Quest, a comedy web television series starring Rob McElhenney for Apple TV+. Hornsby also served as a writer and executive producer for the show which ran for four seasons, premiering on February 7, 2020 and concluding on March 26, 2025.

== Personal life ==
On September 25, 2010, Hornsby married actress Emily Deschanel in Pacific Palisades, California. They have two sons together: Henry Lamar (b. September 21, 2011) and Calvin (b. June 8, 2015).

== Filmography ==
=== Film ===
Year	Title	Role	Notes
2001	Pearl Harbor	Flyer with Murmur	
2002	Minority Report	Pre-Crime Public Service Announcer	
2004	Christmas with the Kranks	Randy Becker	
2006	Flags of Our Fathers	Louis R. Lowery	
2007	Aliens vs. Predator: Requiem	Drew Roberts	
2008	Pretty Bird	Kenny	
2017	The Layover	—N/a	Writer
2023	Fool's Paradise	Pilot	
2023	Merry Little Batman	Joker, Fireman (voice)	Voice; direct-to-streaming film

=== Television ===
Year	Title	Role	Notes
1999	ER	Strauss	Episode: "Choosing Joi"
2003	The Joe Schmo Show	Steve "The Hutch" Hutchison	10 episodes
2003	Six Feet Under	Patrick	7 episodes
2003–04	The Mullets	Denny	11 episodes
2005–06	Jake in Progress	Ken	17 episodes
2005–06	Threshold	Roberts	2 episodes
2006	The West Wing	Fred	Episode: "Institutional Memory"
2006	The X's	Brandon (voice)	Recurring role
2006–present	It's Always Sunny in Philadelphia	Matthew "Rickety Cricket" Mara	Recurring role (26 episodes)
2007	Random! Cartoons	Fanboy, Kid #2 (voice)	Episode: "Fanboy"
2009–12	Fanboy & Chum Chum	Fanboy (voice)	Main role
2011–12	How to Be a Gentleman	Andrew Carlson	Main role Creator, writer, executive producer
2012	Unsupervised	Joel Zymanski (voice)	Main role Co-creator, writer, executive producer
2013	Ben and Kate	Matt Swan	Episode: "B-Squad"
2013–15	Sanjay and Craig	Tyson, Vivian, Edwardo, Radley (voice)	4 episodes
2013	Hello Ladies	Andy	Episode: "The Dinner"
2013	Bones	Priest	Episode: "The Woman in White"
2014	Mission Control	—N/a	Writer and creator
2016	New Girl	Ed Warner	Episode: "James Wonder"
2016–18	Ben 10	Wildvine, additional voices	14 episodes
2016, 2017	Baskets	Pastor	Episode: "Funeral"
2017	The Goldbergs	Kyle Schnitz	3 episodes
2017	Idiotsitter	Dana	Recurring role
2017–19	Welcome to the Wayne	Leif Bornewell III (voice)	Recurring role
2018–20	Good Girls	Boomer	Recurring role
2018	We Bare Bears	Harry (voice)	Episode: "Christmas Movies"
2018	Big Mouth	—N/a	Consulting producer; 7 episodes
2020–25	Mythic Quest	David	Main role Writer, executive producer
2021	DC Super Hero Girls	Riddler (voice)	2 episodes
2025	Bat-Fam	Joker (voice)	3 episodes
2025	St. Denis Medical	Harry	Episode: "No Wonder His Kidney Wants Out"
2026	The Hawk	Radford	10 episodes

=== Video games ===
Year	Title	Role	Notes
2020	Fallout 76: Steel Dawn	Buck	

=== Web ===
Year	Title	Role	Notes
2022	The Always Sunny Podcast	Himself/Guest	1 episode
