= It's Always Sunny in Philadelphia =

American sitcom (2005–present)

- Title card from seasons 1–5
- Genre: Sitcom; Black comedy; Satire
- Created by: Rob McElhenney (Note: Credited as Rob Mac beginning in season 17)
- Developed by: Rob McElhenney; Glenn Howerton
- Showrunners: Rob McElhenney; Glenn Howerton; Charlie Day
- Starring: Charlie Day; Glenn Howerton; Rob McElhenney; Kaitlin Olson; Danny DeVito
- Theme music composer: Heinz Kiessling
- Opening theme: "Temptation Sensation"
- Country of origin: United States
- Original language: English
- No. of seasons: 18
- No. of episodes: 188 (list of episodes)

Production
- Executive producers: Rob McElhenney; Glenn Howerton; Charlie Day; Michael Rotenberg; Nick Frenkel; John Fortenberry; Dan Attias; Tom Lofaro; Scott Marder; Rob Rosell; David Hornsby; Matt Shakman; Megan Ganz; Dannah Phirman; Danielle Schneider; Victor Hsu; Nina Pedrad; John Chernin; Dave Chernin; Vanessa McGee; Jeff Luini
- Producer: Tom Lofaro
- Production locations: Los Angeles, California; Philadelphia, Pennsylvania
- Cinematography: Peter Smokler; John Tanzer; Eric Zimmerman
- Editors: Josh Drisko; Tim Roche; Robert Bramwell; Skip Collector; Trevor Penna; Scott Draper; Steve Welch
- Camera setup: Single-camera
- Running time: 18–43 minutes
- Production companies: 3 Arts Entertainment; RCG Productions (Note: Credited as RCH prior to 2008); 20th Century Fox Television (Seasons 1–2); FXP (Note: Credited as FX Productions until season 12) (Season 3–present)

Original release
- Network: FX
- Release: August 4, 2005 – December 20, 2012
- Release: July 9, 2025 – present
- Network: FXX
- Release: September 4, 2013 – present

It's Always Sunny in Philadelphia (IASIP) is an American sitcom created by Rob McElhenney and co-developed by Glenn Howerton for FX, currently airing on FXX and FX. The show premiered on August 4, 2005, and stars Charlie Day, Howerton, McElhenney, Kaitlin Olson, and Danny DeVito, with Day, Howerton, and McElhenney as executive producers.

The series, influenced by earlier sitcoms like The Office (UK), Seinfeld and Curb Your Enthusiasm, follows the exploits of a group of narcissistic, sociopathic friends who run an Irish dive bar in South Philadelphia, but spend most of their free time drinking, scheming, fighting one another and ruining other people's lives for financial gain and revenge, or simply out of boredom or inebriation.

IASIP is the longest-running American live-action sitcom in terms of total seasons, surpassing The Adventures of Ozzie and Harriet with the release of its 15th season in December 2021. In December 2020, the series was renewed for a total of four additional seasons, bringing it to a total of 18 seasons. The eighteenth season premiered on August 17, 2026.

The series has received critical acclaim, being described with ironic pejorative comparisons like "Seinfeld on crack" and "white trash comedy", and with many critics lauding the show's dark humor, satire, and the cast's performances. It has a large cult following.

== Synopsis ==
=== Premise ===
The series follows a group of self-centered, heavy-drinking misfits, referred to as "the gang", who run a struggling Irish dive bar called Paddy's Pub in the neighborhood of South Philadelphia. In season one, the gang consists of janitor Charlie Kelly (Charlie Day), self-proclaimed bouncer Mac (Rob McElhenney), and bartender Dennis Reynolds (Glenn Howerton), the three of whom own Paddy's Pub, in addition to Dennis' twin sister Dee Reynolds (Kaitlin Olson), a struggling actress who works as a bartender there.

In the second season, they are joined by Frank Reynolds (Danny DeVito), an eccentric multi-millionaire and the neglectful father of the Reynolds twins, who takes over most of the ownership of the bar. He soon becomes the financial catalyst for the gang, funding many of the gang's convoluted schemes and urging them to go further with their brazen depravity.

The main characters in IASIP are generally depicted as ignorant in individual ways, often in both main plots and subplots of episodes. Episodes usually find the gang hatching elaborate schemes and regularly conspiring, against both outsiders and one another, for personal gain, revenge, or simply schadenfreude; these schemes fail in various ways with consequences that characters fail to manage, or exploit.

The show has been described by critics as satirizing racism, misogyny, ableism, homophobia, transphobia, xenophobia, antisemitism and Islamophobia in various depictions of the gang failing to handle everyday situations or to negotiate with comparatively adjusted members of society.

=== Themes ===
Some of the subjects covered for the purpose of satire on the show include masculinity and misogyny, Catholicism, classism and income inequality, racism including blackface, sexual coercion and stalking, child sexual abuse, homophobia, transphobia, American nationalism and substance use. The show frequently satirizes American domestic and foreign policy stances and debates with its depictions of gun violence, abortion rights, climate change, torture, police brutality, the Israeli occupation of Gaza, the 2008 financial crisis and the COVID-19 recession. The show also offers critique of topics like changing social customs and norms, using the gang's traits and follies as a vehicle to parody or lambast social convention.

Class, class conflict, and downward social mobility are recurring themes throughout the show as illustrated by the childhood poverty experienced by Mac and Charlie Kelly relative to Dennis and Dee Reynolds' wealthy, privileged upbringing. Dennis and Dee have not maintained their class status into adulthood. Frank Reynolds, who raised Dennis and Dee but is not their biological father, originally came from a working-class background, and is often implied to be a multi-millionaire, perhaps even a billionaire, who profited through fraud and exploitative business practices, including running sweatshops in developing countries, cheating his business partners and setting up shell companies for tax evasion.

IASIP also frequently engages in absurdist and meta humor, utilizing a variety of television, film, theatre and musical references. The subversion of expectations, both within the sitcom format and culture at large, is a core element of IASIP's legacy.

== Cast and characters ==
The show features a core cast of five characters and a recurring cast of colorful side characters, including the Waitress, Cricket, the McPoyles, the Ponderosas, the Lawyer and various family members like Mrs. Kelly, Mrs. Mac and her estranged husband Luther, and Uncle Jack Kelly, who cross paths and interact with the gang in increasingly unhinged ways as the show progresses.

=== Main ===
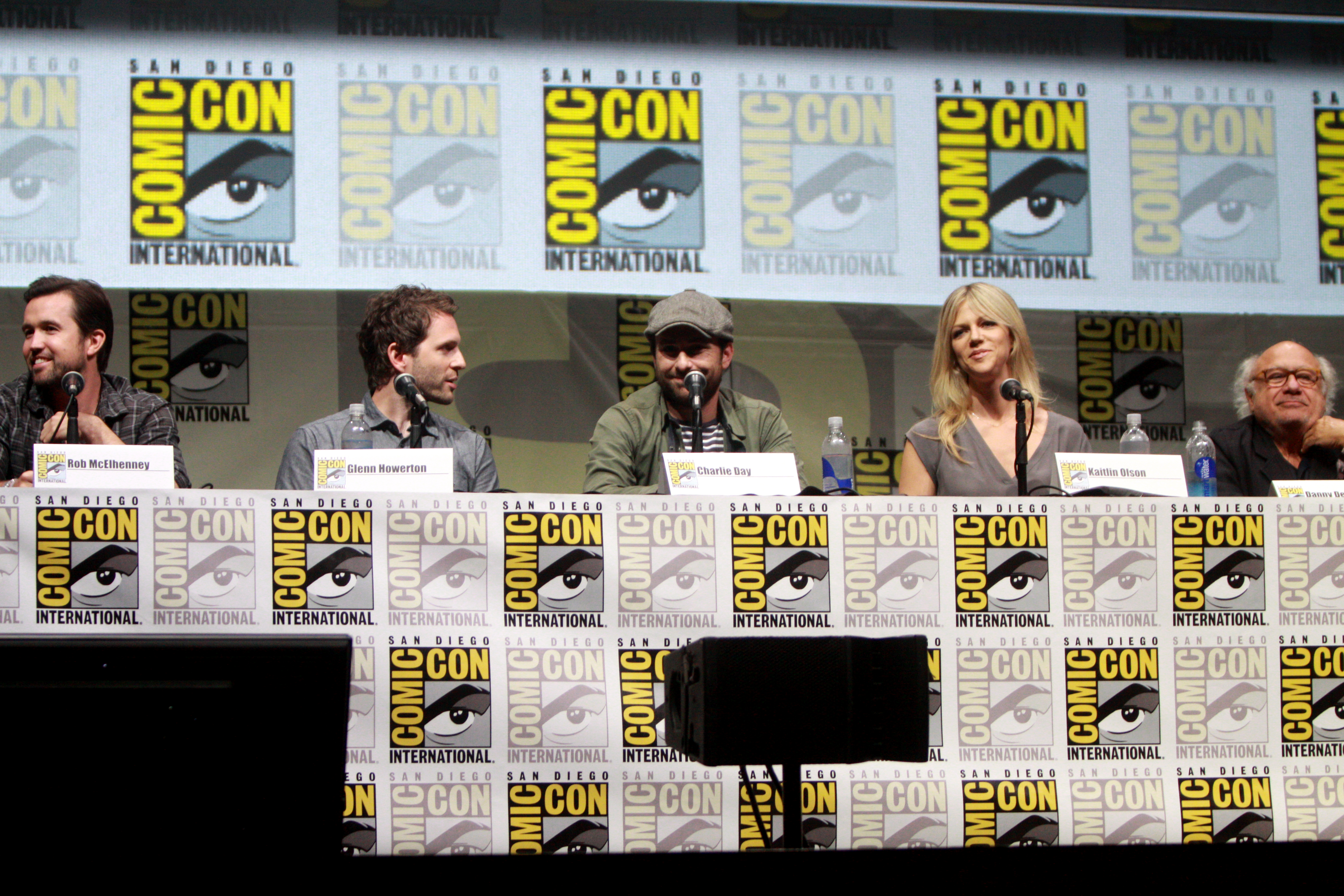
McElhenney, Howerton, Day, Olson and DeVito at the 2013 San Diego Comic-Con

- Charlie Day as Charlie Kelly, co-owner and janitor of Paddy's Pub. Charlie is a childhood friend of Mac, and high school friend of Dennis and Dee. He lives in squalor with Frank, as his roommate and pseudo-father, where they share a bed. Charlie has deep-seated psychological problems, partly due to frequent substance abuse, and partly due to his complicated family background, involving child abuse and neglect. He has an extensive history of pica and regularly eats various items not meant for human consumption, such as cat food, stickers, paint, and crow eggs. Due to his ignorance, misunderstanding of social norms, and illiteracy, Charlie is generally regarded as the stupidest member of the gang. Despite this, Charlie can innately read Irish Gaelic, is a naturally gifted musician, and possibly the only competent worker at Paddy's with his knack for unorthodox maintenance practices ("Charlie Work"). He also has an obsession with "The Waitress", a recurring character who he stalks and harasses.
- Glenn Howerton as Dennis Reynolds, co-owner and the main bartender of Paddy's Pub, in addition to being Dee's twin brother and Frank's son. Seemingly the most intelligent and normal of the three co-owners, Dennis is slowly revealed to be the most narcissistic and sociopathic of the gang. Dennis is extremely insecure, self-centered, and vain. He is overly concerned with the people around him buying into an image of him as intelligent, cultured, attractive, and of high status. At his most delusional, he refers to himself as a "Golden God" and flies into fits of rage when he believes he is being disrespected. Dennis' vanity is partly fed by his roommate and best friend Mac, who is in love with him, and is hinted to be a result of his mother preferring him to his twin sister Dee. Dennis' predatory nature is often depicted through numerous schemes to seduce women, typically much younger than him. It is hinted at times that Dennis may secretly be a serial killer, though this is a running gag, and not a confirmed characteristic. In season 10, Dennis is diagnosed with borderline personality disorder, though it is not clear if the diagnosis was definitive, according to Glenn Howerton. In the season 12 finale, Dennis reveals to the rest of the gang that he has an infant son, and moves to North Dakota to raise him. He inexplicably returns to Philadelphia in season 13, seeming to have abandoned his son. In later seasons, Dennis becomes even more preoccupied with his age and loss of general fitness and attractiveness, something the rest of the gang is aware of and uses to hurt and/or manipulate him.
- Rob McElhenney as Ronald "Mac" McDonald, co-owner and self-proclaimed "head of security" of Paddy's Pub. Mac is Charlie's childhood friend and Dennis's high school friend. Mac is insecure about his masculinity and homosexuality, constantly seeking the approval of those around him, especially his absent father, his apathetic mother, and his self-absorbed roommate Dennis. He often tries to prove himself and his perceived toughness to his father, who is a convicted felon. He has extreme bouts of body dysmorphia, and has been depicted at various weights throughout the series. Mac often brags about his hand-to-hand combat skills, but typically flees from physical confrontation and is usually depicted as the most cowardly of the gang. Mac is a Roman Catholic, though he often espouses strong Christian fundamentalist opinions, and his religion is regularly in conflict with his behavior and his homosexuality. It is insinuated for years that Mac is gay and harbors feelings for his best friend Dennis, though he remains in denial, much to the gang's annoyance, until he comes out in season 12.
- Kaitlin Olson as Deandra "Sweet Dee" Reynolds, bartender at Paddy's Pub, as well as Dennis's twin sister and Frank's daughter. Initially Dee could be considered the gang's "voice of reason" however, Dee quickly loses any sense of moral fortitude and is shown to be just as prejudiced and depraved as her male colleagues within a few episodes of season 1. Dee is frequently the subject of the gang's casual misogyny, leading to her resenting them and plotting against them and others whom she deems more successful than herself. Like her brother, Dee is deeply insecure, though unlike him, she was a disappointment to her mother; so she craves approval from Dennis and Frank in any way. Though often the butt of the gang's jokes, she nevertheless stays involved with them because of her desperate need for attention. Unlike the men, Dee lives alone and does not hold any ownership stake in the bar, in part due to her desire to become a professional actress/comedian (an ambition she consistently fails to achieve because of her debilitating stage fright and her lack of talent). Dennis and Dee are frequently shown to be two sides of the same coin, with Dee often being depicted engaging in predatory behavior towards young men.
- Danny DeVito as Frank Reynolds (season 2–present), the legal father of Dennis and Dee Reynolds (despite having no biological children of his own) and the majority owner of Paddy's Pub soon after his introduction onwards. Frank is a multi-millionaire who often funds and enables the gang's worst schemes and impulses, just to feel a sense of youthfulness and energy. He was once a successful businessman with a long history of illegal operations, including running sweatshops in Vietnam, and dealings with sordid characters. He has since embraced his "feral" nature and describes himself as "fringe class". Despite his substantial financial resources, he chooses to share a decrepit one-bedroom apartment with Charlie, where they sleep together on a pullout couch and have a codependent pseudo-familial relationship. The two have similar interests, such as playing Night Crawlers, collecting trash, boiling denim, eating garbage, and foraging naked in the sewers for rings and coins. Frank often arms himself with at least one loaded handgun – usually a snubnosed revolver – and does not hesitate to brandish or even discharge one when provoked, and has been known to snort cocaine as part of his daily routine. Whenever the gang gets into trouble, Frank is happy to embrace his status as a multi-millionaire and bail them out.

== Production ==
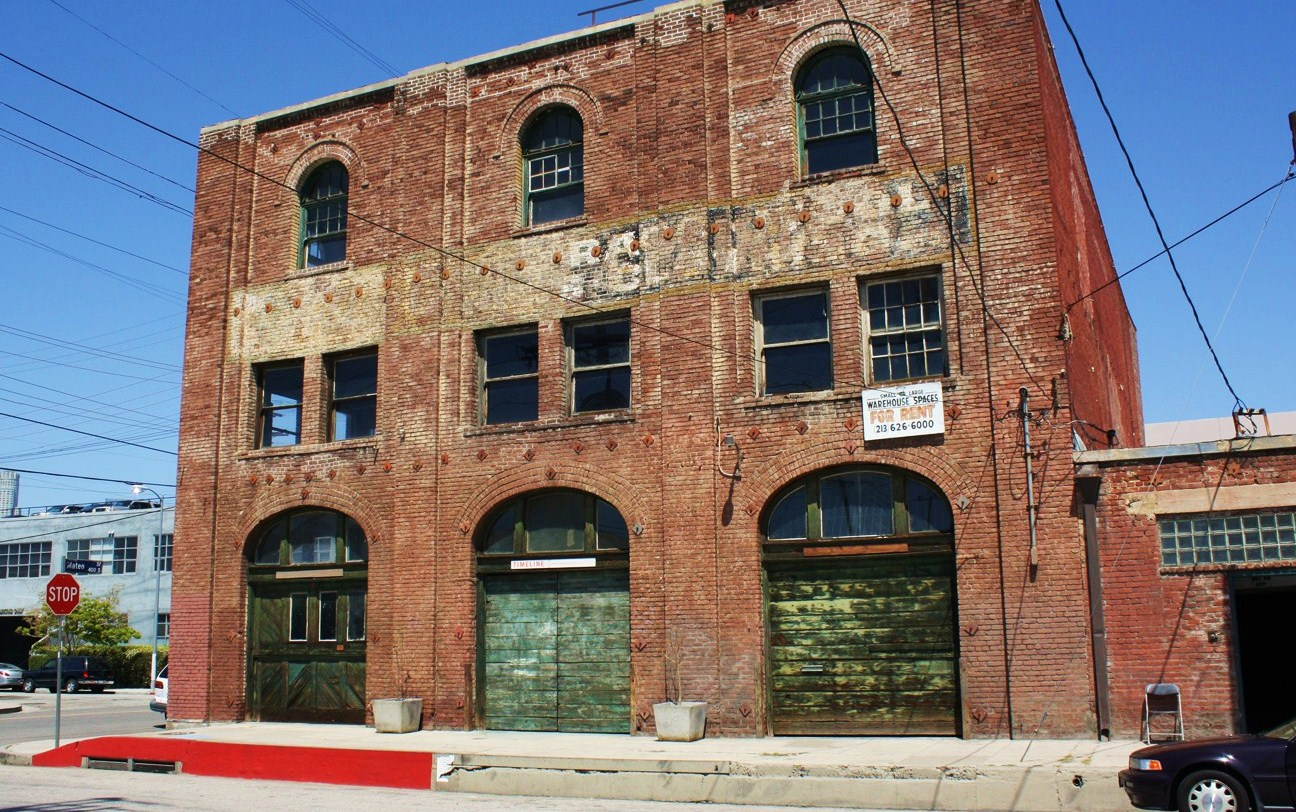
Exterior shots of Paddy's Pub are shot at the Starkman Building on 544 Mateo Street in Los Angeles.

=== Conception ===
Charlie Day, Glenn Howerton, and Rob McElhenney first met each other while auditioning for Tuck Everlasting and other projects in New York City and, later, in Los Angeles—they were going up for similar parts, moved to Los Angeles around the same time and even had the same manager, Nick Frenkel. Day and Howerton, notably, got to know each other on a car ride back from testing for That '80s Show in late 2001, when Howerton was cast as Corey Howard, although Day did not get the part of his best friend.

While living in New York, Day had been making comedic home movies with his friends from the Williamstown Theatre Festival—Jimmi Simpson, Nate Mooney, David Hornsby and Logan Marshall-Green, (many of whom would later go on to be involved with Sunny)—which inspired McElhenney and Howerton to want to make short films of their own with him. McElhenney, in particular, had been writing screenplays between jobs and since none of them were picked up, decided to shoot them himself with Howerton, Day and other actor friends. The decision to make their own short films was further influenced by the release of the affordable Panasonic DVX100A digital camera as well as the accessible, low-budget look of The Office (UK) and Curb Your Enthusiasm.

It's Always Sunny in Philadelphia grew out of an idea for a short film conceived late one night by McElhenney "where a friend came over to another friend's house to get sugar, and the friend tells him he has cancer, and all the guy can think about is getting his sugar and getting out of there". He wrote the scene down before taking it to Howerton the next day to flesh it out and work on making it comedic. Day was soon roped in and the first script was written, featuring three struggling actors in LA named Charlie, Glenn, and Mac, and the ensuing awkwardness around Charlie's cancer diagnosis. The home movies were shot and reshot multiple times, initially with Hornsby playing the Mac character and Rob McElhenney behind the camera as director. It was via this process that McElhenney, Day, and Howerton learned the basics of shooting, editing, and other aspects of filmmaking. The three then developed a second "episode" of their home movie series, this time focused on the humor from Mac's sense of shame around his relationship with Carmen, a transgender woman. At this point, it became clear that the home movies had potential as a television series, instead of the short films they were originally envisioned as. Both parts would eventually end up in the episode "Charlie Has Cancer".

The home movie was titled It's Always Sunny on TV after the a-ha song "The Sun Always Shines on T.V.". Howerton had been listening to the album Hunting High and Low (1985) while stretching at a Crunch gym in West Hollywood. This was then developed into a pilot called It's Always Sunny on TV and was shot on a digital camcorder and filmed in the actors' own apartments. They expanded the central cast to four people living in Los Angeles, "a group of best friends who care so little for each other", Howerton said.

It was often claimed that the pilot was shot with a budget of just $200, but Day would later comment, "We shot it for nothing... I don't know where this $200 came from... We were a bunch of kids with cameras running around shooting each other and [the] next thing you know, we're eleven years in and we're still doing the show." This pilot was shopped by the actors around various studios, their pitch being simply showing the DVD of the pilot to executives.

=== Development ===
After viewing the pilot, FX Network ordered the first season. The show was budgeted at $450,000 an episode, less than a third of a network standard, using Panasonic's DVX100 MiniDV prosumer video camera. The original concept had "the gang" being out-of-work actors with the theme song being a cha-cha version of "Hooray for Hollywood"; however there were too many shows at the time with a similar premise. "The network came to us and said, 'We don't want a show about actors,' and we said, 'Fine, let's put it somewhere else,'" McElhenney explained. "I'm from Philly, let's put it in Philly, and we'll make it about a bar, because that's a job where you can have lots of free time and still have income that could explain how these people can sustain themselves." The title was later changed to reflect that, in the unaired pilot, the gang had been rewritten as bar owners in Philadelphia, instead of actors in LA. Prior to Kaitlin Olson joining the show, the character Sweet Dee was going to be played by Jordan Reid, who at the time was the girlfriend of McElhenney. The part was recast after they broke up.

After the first season, FX executives were worried about the show's low ratings and demanded that changes be made to the cast. "So, John Landgraf, who's the president of FX, he called me in for a meeting and was like, 'Hey, no one's watching the show, but we love it,'" McElhenney recalled. "'We wanna keep it on, but we don't have any money for marketing, and we need to add somebody with some panache that we can hopefully parlay into some public relations story, just so we can get people talking.'" FX began suggesting actors such as Danny DeVito that could boost the show's profile. McElhenney, Howerton, and Day were hesitant at first since they thought they would "ruin the show". "It's not that we were reticent to the idea of adding Danny to the show," Howerton recalled, "It's that we were reticent to add a name to the show. You know, because we kinda liked that we were no-names and it was this weird, small thing, you know." Initially, McElhenney refused, saying "No, I just don't think we wanna do that, and they were like, 'Oh OK, well, you know... the show's over.'" Realizing they needed to change the trajectory of the show to please the network, McElhenney, Howerton, and Day became open to adding a new cast member who was familiar to the public. Day later commented on how they got lucky with DeVito in the end: "We didn't know what Danny would be like as a person. It turned out he was as great an actor as he was a person. As I said, we got lucky with Danny." DeVito joined the cast in the first episode of the second season, playing the father of Dennis and Dee.

=== Locations ===
The show is filmed in both Philadelphia and Los Angeles. Although many interior scenes are shot in California, numerous Philadelphia landmarks are featured, including Boathouse Row, Rittenhouse Square, Penn's Landing, and Italian Market.

The exterior of Paddy's Pub is the Starkman Building at 544 Mateo Street in downtown Los Angeles.

Half of season 15 takes place in Ireland. Due to COVID-19 restrictions, the principal cast did not travel there. Instead, B-roll was filmed in Ireland by a second unit, while northern California locations were digitally altered to resemble Irish landscapes.

=== Later seasons ===
On April 1, 2016, the series was renewed for a thirteenth and fourteenth season, which matched The Adventures of Ozzie and Harriet with the most seasons for a live-action sitcom in American television history.

In January 2023, McElhenney confirmed that filming for the sixteenth season had begun. In May 2024, DeVito stated that the eight-episode seventeenth season would begin filming in September 2024, with filming wrapping in December 2024. Season 17 premiered simultaneously on both FX and FXX on July 9, 2025, with episodes also available for streaming the next day on Hulu. Filming for the eighteenth season began in February 2026 and completed in April 2026.

== Episodes ==
Season	Episodes	Originally released		
Season	Episodes	First released	Last released	Network
1	7	August 4, 2005	September 13, 2005	FX
2	10	June 29, 2006	August 17, 2006	FX
3	15	September 13, 2007	November 15, 2007	FX
4	13	September 18, 2008	November 20, 2008	FX
5	12	September 17, 2009	December 10, 2009	FX
6	14	September 16, 2010	December 16, 2010	FX
7	13	September 15, 2011	December 15, 2011	FX
8	10	October 11, 2012	December 20, 2012	FX
9	10	September 4, 2013	November 6, 2013	FXX
10	10	January 14, 2015	March 18, 2015	FXX
11	10	January 6, 2016	March 9, 2016	FXX
12	10	January 4, 2017	March 8, 2017	FXX
13	10	September 5, 2018	November 7, 2018	FXX
14	10	September 25, 2019	November 20, 2019	FXX
15	8	December 1, 2021	December 22, 2021	FXX
16	8	June 7, 2023	July 19, 2023	FXX
17	8	July 9, 2025	August 20, 2025	FXX/FX
18	10	August 17, 2026	October 12, 2026	FXX/FX

== Broadcast and syndication ==
The first season ran for seven episodes with the finale airing September 15, 2005. According to McElhenney, word of mouth on the show was good enough for FX to renew it for a second season, which ran from June 29 to August 17, 2006. Reruns of edited first-season episodes began airing on FX's then-parent network, Fox, in June 2006, for a planned three-episode run—"The Gang Finds a Dead Guy", "Gun Fever" (which was renamed "Gun Control") and "Charlie Gets Molested" were shown. The show was not aired on broadcast television again until 2011, when FX began offering it for syndication.

The third season ran from September 13 to November 15, 2007. On March 5, 2008, FX renewed It's Always Sunny in Philadelphia for a fourth season. On July 15, 2008, it was reported that FX had ordered 39 additional episodes of the series, produced as seasons five through seven of the show. All five main cast members were secured for the entire scheduled run. The fifth season ran from September 17 to December 10, 2009. On May 31, 2010, Comedy Central began airing reruns. WGN America also began broadcasting the show as part of its fall 2011 schedule.

The sixth season ran from September 16 to December 9, 2010, comprising 12 episodes, plus the Christmas special. The seventh season ran from September 15 to December 15, 2011, comprising 13 episodes. On August 6, 2011, FX announced it had picked up the show for an additional two seasons (the eighth and ninth) running through 2013. On March 28, 2013, FX renewed the show for a tenth season, and announced that it would move to FX's new sister network, FXX.

In April 2017, Kaitlin Olson announced that It's Always Sunny in Philadelphia would go on an extended hiatus. In an interview with TV Guide, she said, "We ended up pushing our next season a year because we were all busy with separate projects this year. So at the end of this coming shooting season of The Mick, I'll step right into Sunny after that." On October 2, 2017, the show premiered on Vice on TV.

The series is available for streaming on Hulu except for the episodes "America's Next Top Paddy's Billboard Model Contest", "Dee Reynolds: Shaping America's Youth", "The Gang Recycles Their Trash", "The Gang Makes Lethal Weapon 6", and "Dee Day", which were removed because they contain scenes involving characters in blackface and performing as other racial caricatures. The same five episodes are missing from Netflix in the UK and Ireland, and from Disney+ in Australia, Canada, Scandinavia, Spain, and Latin America.

In December 2025, Disney announced that It's Always Sunny in Philadelphia was among the television series to surpass one billion hours streamed on Disney+ in 2025.

== Music ==
"Temptation Sensation"
Performed by Heinz Kiessling (30 seconds)

The show uses recurring orchestral production music selections. "We had a music supervisor called Ray Espinola and we said, 'Give us everything you have in a sort of Leave It to Beaver with a big band-swing kind of feel,' and the majority of the songs are from what he sent over," Charlie Day explained to Entertainment Weekly. "When you set it against what these characters were doing—which often times can be perceived as quite despicable, or wrong—it really disarmed the audience. It just became our go-to library of songs."

On "Temptation Sensation" – the show's theme song composed by Heinz Kiessling – Day remarked: "We were leaning toward 'Off Broadway' to be the theme song. But John Landgraf, the president of the network, really liked 'Temptation Sensation' and he put his foot down. Now I'm happy it's the theme tune. But it is an odd title." Kiessling's work ("On Your Bike" and "Blue Blood") can also be heard during various scene transitions throughout the show, along with other composers and pieces such as Werner Tautz ("Off Broadway"), Joe Brook ("Moonbeam Kiss"), and Karl Grell ("Honey Bunch").

Many of the tracks heard in the series are from Cafe Romantique, an album of easy listening production music collected by Extreme Music, the production music library unit of Sony/ATV Music Publishing. Fervor Records, an independent record label, has also contributed music to the show. Songs from The Jack Gray Orchestra's album Easy Listening Symph-O-Nette ("Take A Letter Miss Jones", "Golly Gee Whiz", and "Not a Care in the World") and the John Costello III release Giants of Jazz ("Birdcage", "Cotton Club" and "Quintessential") are heard in several episodes. The soundtrack, featuring most of the music heard on the show, was released in 2010.

=== Soundtrack track listing ===
It's Always Sunny in Philadelphia (Music from the Original TV Series) track listing
No.	Title	Music	Artist	Length
1.	"Temptation Sensation (Main Title Theme)"	Heinz Kiessling	The Heinz Kiessling Orchestra	2:53
2.	"Derby Day"	Werner Tautz	The Heinz Kiessling Orchestra	2:39
3.	"Blue Blood"	Heinz Kiessling	The Heinz Kiessling Orchestra	2:54
4.	"On Your Bike"	Heinz Kiessling	The Heinz Kiessling Orchestra	2:15
5.	"Take the Plunge"	Heinz Kiessling	The Heinz Kiessling Orchestra	3:10
6.	"Hotsy-Totsy"	Heinz Kiessling	The Heinz Kiessling Orchestra	2:18
7.	"Off Broadway"	Werner Tautz	The Heinz Kiessling Orchestra	2:31
8.	"Coconut Shy"	Heinz Kiessling	The Diamontinos	2:25
9.	"Honey Bunch"	Karl Grell	The Ralph Manning Orchestra	2:44
10.	"Glitterati Party"	Werner Tautz	The Heinz Kiessling Orchestra	2:51
11.	"Singles Soiree"	Richard Faecks	The Rüdiger Piesker Orchestra	2:09
12.	"Pink Deville"	Paul Rothman	The Ole Olafsen Band	2:34
13.	"Captain's Table"	Heinz Kiessling	The Heinz Kiessling Orchestra	2:44
14.	"Starlet Express"	Werner Tautz	The Heinz Kiessling Orchestra	2:31
15.	"Final Fling"	Heinz Kiessling	The Heinz Kiessling Orchestra	2:29
16.	"Sweetheart Serenade"	Werner Tautz	The Heinz Kiessling Orchestra	2:54
17.	"Tea at Tiffani's"	Werner Tautz	The Heinz Kiessling Orchestra	2:28
18.	"Moonbeam Kiss"	Joe Brook	The Rüdiger Piesker Orchestra	2:21
19.	"Grand Central"	Werner Tautz	The Heinz Kiessling Orchestra	3:15
Total length:				50:05

== Reception and legacy ==
=== Critical response ===
It's Always Sunny in Philadelphia has received critical acclaim for its humor and the cast's performances. On review aggregator website Metacritic, the show has an average score of 72 out of 100, indicating "generally favorable" reviews from critics. The following seasons are scored out of 100: season 1 (64), season 2 (70), season 4 (69), season 5 (78), season 6 (84), season 9 (86), season 16 (82), and season 17 (80).

In 2005, Brian Lowry of Variety called it "invariably clever and occasionally a laugh‑out‑loud riot". Early criticism included Gillian Flynn of Entertainment Weekly, who described season 1 as "smug... not smart enough to know it isn't".

The series has earned a cult following and is often likened to Seinfeld. In 2008, Jonathan Storm of The Philadelphia Inquirer described it as "like Seinfeld on crack"—a phrase later used as an FX tagline. Louisa Mellor of Den of Geek praised the show in 2012, urging readers to watch the show. In 2013, Emily Nussbaum of The New Yorker called it "one of the most arresting and ambitious current TV series, period". Nussbaum further described the show as follows: "—it looks stupid but is in fact smart. It seems cruel but is secretly compassionate. Mostly, it is very, very funny. Laugh-out-loud funny. At its finest moments, cackling-in-the-basement-while-huffing-glue funny."

Recent seasons have continued to receive positive critical reception. In 2023, Ross Bonaime of Collider wrote of season 16 that the show "remains one of the funniest, strangest, and most unpredictable shows, even after eighteen years, and it's this type of longevity and brilliance that will make it go down as one of the all-time great sitcoms". In 2025, Consequence awarded season 17 a "B+," describing it as "homage-heavy while remaining its true crass self". CBR referred to season 17 as "one of the darkest seasons yet", citing its standout narrative twist.

=== Rankings and accolades ===
- Ranked #7 on Entertainment Weekly‍'s "26 Best Cult TV Shows Ever" (2014).
- A New York Times interactive map (2016) found the show to be "more popular in college towns (and most popular in Philadelphia)".
- In 2015, Rolling Stone named the two-part episode "Mac and Charlie Die" the series' best.
- The BBC called it "the best US sitcom" in 2019.
- IGN's Matt Fowler ranked it #63 on IGN's list of the Top 100 TV Shows of All Time.

=== Awards ===
Award	Year	Category	Nominee(s)	Result	Ref.
Critics' Choice Television Awards	2011	Best Actor in a Comedy Series	Charlie Day	Nominated	
IGN Awards	2018	Best Comedic TV Performance	Rob McElhenney	Nominated	
IGN Awards	2018	Best TV Comedy Series	It's Always Sunny in Philadelphia	Nominated	
IGN Awards	2018	Best TV Episode	It's Always Sunny in Philadelphia ("Mac Finds His Pride")	Nominated	
IGN Awards	2019	Best TV Ensemble	Charlie Day, Glenn Howerton, Rob McElhenney, Kaitlin Olson, and Danny DeVito	Nominated	
People's Choice Awards	2012	Favorite Cable TV Comedy	It's Always Sunny in Philadelphia	Nominated	
People's Choice Awards	2013	Favorite Cable TV Comedy	It's Always Sunny in Philadelphia	Nominated	
People's Choice Awards	2016	Favorite Cable TV Comedy	It's Always Sunny in Philadelphia	Won	
People's Choice Awards	2017	Favorite Cable TV Comedy	It's Always Sunny in Philadelphia	Nominated	
Primetime Emmy Awards	2013	Outstanding Stunt Coordination for a Comedy Series or a Variety Program	Marc Scizak	Nominated	
Primetime Emmy Awards	2014	Outstanding Stunt Coordination for a Comedy Series or a Variety Program	Marc Scizak	Nominated	
Primetime Emmy Awards	2015	Outstanding Stunt Coordination for a Comedy Series or a Variety Program	Marc Scizak	Nominated	
Satellite Awards	2008	Best Television Series, Comedy or Musical	It's Always Sunny in Philadelphia	Nominated	
Satellite Awards	2008	Best Actor in a Series, Comedy or Musical	Danny DeVito	Nominated	
Satellite Awards	2011	Best Television Series, Comedy or Musical	It's Always Sunny in Philadelphia	Won	
Satellite Awards	2011	Best Actor in a Series, Comedy or Musical	Charlie Day	Nominated	
Astra TV Awards	2024	Best Cable Comedy Series	It's Always Sunny in Philadelphia	Nominated	
Astra TV Awards	2024	Best Actress in a Broadcast Network or Cable Comedy Series	Kaitlin Olson	Nominated	

== Other media ==
=== The Nightman Cometh live ===
In September 2009, the cast took their show live. The "Gang" performed the musical The Nightman Cometh in New York City, Boston, Seattle, San Francisco, Los Angeles, and Philadelphia. Mary Elizabeth Ellis and Artemis Pebdani also appeared in the performance as The Waitress and Artemis. Actress Rhea Perlman (wife of Danny DeVito) assumed the role of Gladys. Creator Rob McElhenney said that Live Nation originally approached the cast about doing the show at 30 cities, but in the end the cast settled on six. Co-developer Glenn Howerton described the show as "essentially an expanded version of the actual episode of "The Nightman Cometh", which was the final episode for season 4. There are some added moments, added scenes, added songs, and extended versions of songs that already existed." The performance featured two new songs, and the actors were given more opportunity to improvise thanks to the longer running time. An episode from season 5 was also previewed before the show. The Los Angeles performance, filmed at The Troubadour, was included as a bonus feature on the season 4 DVD box set.

=== Russian adaptation ===
A Russian adaptation of It's Always Sunny in Philadelphia premiered in Russia on the television channel TNT on May 12, 2014. This version is titled В Москве всегда солнечно (V Moskve vsegda solnechno, It's Always Sunny in Moscow) and like the original, centers around four friends, who own a bar called "Philadelphia" in Moscow. The series ran for a single season of 16 episodes, with many episodes featuring plots inspired by the US show.

=== Books ===
A book based upon It's Always Sunny in Philadelphia was released on January 6, 2015, titled The Gang Writes a Self-Help Book: The 7 Secrets of Awakening the Highly Effective Four-Hour Giant, Today. In 2023, Laurel Randolph collaborated with Disney to release a cookbook inspired by the show's grotesque food, titled Paddy's Pub: The Worst Bar In Philadelphia: An It's Always Sunny In Philadelphia Cookbook. The cookbook was released on September 26, 2023, and features more than 45 recipes ranging from Charlie's favorite dish, milk steak boiled over hard with jelly beans on the side, to Frank Reynolds' famous rum ham.

=== The Always Sunny Podcast ===
In November 2021, Howerton, Day, and McElhenney started The Always Sunny Podcast, an episode-by-episode rewatch podcast, with Megan Ganz as producer. Occasional guest stars include Kaitlin Olson, David Hornsby, Mary Elizabeth Ellis, Michael Naughton, Lin-Manuel Miranda, Cormac Bluestone, and Danny DeVito. The first live podcast event was performed at the Louisville festival, Bourbon & Beyond, in September 2022. The podcast then went on tour in 2023, including live shows in New York City, Philadelphia, London, and Dublin to crowds as large as 9,000 viewers.

The podcast was put on indefinite hold in July 2023, and Howerton confirmed its end in July 2024, stating that the actors' busy schedules had made filming podcast episodes impractical.

=== Abbott Elementary crossover ===
In October 2024, it was announced that a two-episode crossover event with Abbott Elementary would begin as the ninth episode of the fourth season of Abbott Elementary, and conclude in the seventeenth season of It's Always Sunny in Philadelphia. The Abbott episode, "Volunteers", aired on January 8, 2025.
