= The Gang Goes to a Dog Track =

- It's Always Sunny in Philadelphia episode
- Episode no.: Season 17; Episode 5
- Directed by: Heath Cullens
- Written by: Charlie Day; Ross Maloney
- Cinematography by: John Tanzer
- Editing by: Josh Drisko; Steve Welch
- Production code: XIP17001
- Original air date: July 30, 2025
- Running time: 21 minutes

Guest appearances
- Grayson Berry as Sparky; Marlon Young as Louis

Episode chronology
| ← Previous "Thought Leadership: A Corporate Conversation" | Next → "Overage Drinking: A National Concern" |
- It's Always Sunny in Philadelphia season 17

"The Gang Goes to a Dog Track" is the fifth episode of the seventeenth season of the American sitcom television series It's Always Sunny in Philadelphia. It is the 175th overall episode of the series and was written by executive producer Charlie Day and staff writer Ross Maloney, and directed by co-executive producer Heath Cullens. It originally aired on FX and FXX on July 30, 2025.

The series follows "The Gang", a group of five misfit friends: twins Dennis and Deandra "(Sweet) Dee" Reynolds, their friends Charlie Kelly and Ronald "Mac" McDonald, and Frank Reynolds, Dennis's and Dee's legal father. The Gang runs the fictional Paddy's Pub, an unsuccessful Irish bar in South Philadelphia. In the episode, Frank takes the Gang to a dog track; while Charlie and Mac meet a philosophical worker, Dennis and Dee are introduced to the world of gambling.

According to Nielsen Media Research, the episode was seen by an estimated 0.204 million household viewers and gained a 0.07 ratings share among adults aged 18–49. The episode received mostly positive reviews, who highlighted its dark humor and Danny DeVito's performance as strong points.

== Plot ==
The Gang takes a bus with plans to go to the Kentucky Derby, but midway through the trip, Frank reveals that he is actually taking them to a dog track, Wildwood Greyhound Gardens, in West Virginia. Frank is a minority owner of a hound in the track, and the place is soon closing out.

As Charlie and Mac consider betting on dogs, Charlie takes an interest in a man, Sparky, who tells them to bet on a dog named Squeaky Wheels. Mac is suspicious of Sparky, as he takes a raw hot dog from Charlie and wears no shoes. They ignore his suggestion, but are shocked when Squeaky Wheels wins. They find him again, finding that he finds food for the dogs and does not wear shoes out of respect for dogs. Sparky takes them to an animal shelter in the track, where he usually takes care of dogs. Dennis and Dee are disappointed with the experience, as they hoped to enter the high society elite at the Kentucky Derby. Frank introduces them to a friend, who co-owns part of his hound. He gets Dennis and Dee addicted to gambling, going from betting their own clothes to using them to eat dog food in a bet. Despite the humiliating experience, Dennis and Dee are determined to win back their money.

After Sparky introduces them to his home trailer, Charlie and Mac inform him that the dog track will close down, which he did not know. Sparky then goes to his bedroom, where he commits suicide with a gunshot, prompting Charlie and Mac to flee after clearing their fingerprints from the scene. Before exiting the trailer, Charlie mentions setting the trailer on fire to further cover their tracks. To recoup their money, Dennis and Dee masturbate one of the dogs, as Frank wanted to make a deal with Saudis about it. However, Frank reveals that this was all part of an elaborate bet with his friend, betting that he could get them to masturbate the dog. He subsequently reveals that there is no deal with Saudis as he does not own a hound, and he does not care about gambling on dogs. On the bus back home, the Gang, with the exception of Frank, are speechless and stunned after the events at the dog track. During the credits, Sparky's trailer is seen engulfed in flames.

== Production ==
=== Development ===
In July 2025, FXX reported that the fifth episode of the seventeenth season would be titled "The Gang Goes to a Dog Track", and was to be written by executive producer Charlie Day and staff writer Ross Maloney, and directed by co-executive producer Heath Cullens. This was Day's 68th writing credit, Maloney's 2nd writing credit, and Cullens' 15th directing credit.

=== Filming ===
While the episode was the fifth of the season to air, it was actually the first filmed. Filming for the episode and the season began on October 16, 2024.

== Reception ==
=== Viewers ===
In its original American broadcast, "The Gang Goes to a Dog Track" was seen by an estimated 0.112 million household viewers and gained a 0.03 ratings share among adults aged 18–49 in FX, and 0.092 million household viewers and gained a 0.04 ratings share among adults aged 18–49 in FXX. Combined, the episode was seen by an estimated 0.204 million household viewers and a 0.07 ratings share among adults aged 18–49. This means that 0.07 percent of all households with televisions watched the episode. This was a 12% decrease in viewership from the previous episode, which was watched by 0.231 million viewers with a 0.08 in the 18–49 demographics across its two simulcast airings.

=== Critical reviews ===
The episode received mostly positive reviews from critics. Ross Bonaime of Collider wrote, "Season 17 might actually go down as DeVito's best season on the comedy, and it allows him to really showcase everything he's capable of. We get to see the petty, ludicrous nature of Frank in 'Frank Is in a Coma' and just how absolutely wild and dark he can get in 'The Gang Goes to a Dog Track.'"

Charles Papadopoulos of Screen Rant wrote, "After 19 years, It's Always Sunny in Philadelphia has a dark follow-up episode to an all-time classic. It's Always Sunny season 17 is already over halfway done, with 'The Gang Goes to a Dog Track' airing on FX and Hulu this week. The episode immediately stands out as one of the season's best, with the feeling of classic Sunny." Danielle Ryan of /Film wrote, "Depending on your sense of humor, the whole thing is either brilliant dark comedy or one bridge too far, but it's definitely a joke for only the most diehard Sunny sickos."

Jerrica Tisdale of Telltale TV gave the episode a 3.5 star rating out of 5 and wrote, "We can appreciate how funny some of 'The Gang Goes to a Dog Track' scenes and lines are, but also be a little horrified by some of the choices. That's also the point, and you can either love it or be disturbed. Either way, it elicits a reaction." Sam Huang of TV Fanatic gave the episode a 3 star rating out of 5 and wrote, "It's a little strange to have two episodes in a row about betting, especially when it's halfway through the season and the show needs to keep things fresh. To its credit, this episode doesn't necessarily feel like hitting the same beat over and over again. It has the spirit of It's Always Sunny's signature humor, without being too overbearing, unlike the previous episode."
