= Thought Leadership: A Corporate Conversation =

- It's Always Sunny in Philadelphia episode
- Episode no.: Season 17; Episode 4
- Directed by: Zachary Knighton
- Written by: Charlie Day; Rob McElhenney
- Cinematography by: John Tanzer
- Editing by: Scott Draper
- Production code: XIP17004
- Original air date: July 23, 2025
- Running time: 21 minutes

Guest appearances
- Mary Elizabeth Ellis as The Waitress

Episode chronology
← Previous "Mac and Dennis Become EMTs"	Next → "The Gang Goes to a Dog Track"
- It's Always Sunny in Philadelphia season 17

"Thought Leadership: A Corporate Conversation" is the fourth episode of the seventeenth season of the American sitcom television series It's Always Sunny in Philadelphia. It is the 174th overall episode of the series and was written by executive producers Charlie Day and series creator Rob McElhenney, and directed by Zachary Knighton. It originally aired on FX and FXX on July 23, 2025.

The series follows "The Gang", a group of five misfit friends: twins Dennis and Deandra "(Sweet) Dee" Reynolds, their friends Charlie Kelly and Ronald "Mac" McDonald, and Frank Reynolds, Dennis's and Dee's legal father. The Gang runs the fictional Paddy's Pub, an unsuccessful Irish bar in South Philadelphia. In the episode, the Gang faces bad publicity after an incident and set out to find who should be their "fall guy" for the incident.

According to Nielsen Media Research, the episode was seen by an estimated 0.231 million household viewers and gained a 0.08 ratings share among adults aged 18–49. The episode received mixed reviews; while some praised its humor, others were more mixed on its inconsistent narrative.

== Plot ==
Paddy's Pub faces controversy after 500 gallons of baby oil and 200 Paddy's Pub T-shirts were dumped into the Schuylkill River. When a reporter arrives for some testimonies, the Gang meets to discuss their strategy to avoid a public relations nightmare. To start, they begin to trace their steps to find who is the "fall guy" responsible. (The rest of the episode is told in flashback.)

A few weeks prior, they got water jugs, which they used to make a watercooler. As they talk over multiple topics, Mac brings up "slap fights". They begin slapping each other every time they have a conversation, and they also begin a business venture where Paddy's hosts slap fights with patrons. While revenue increases, Dennis is concerned over the lack of "eroticism" and suggests expanding the slap fights to more female patrons with baby oil. Worried that they need more attractive women, Frank uses a Tesla Cybertruck as a winning prize for the competition. Not wanting to lose the Cybertruck, the Gang tries to rig the competition by having Dee participate. Dee manages to win a few rounds, but is eventually knocked out, losing the car.

Dee blames Charlie for the loss, as he informed the Waitress about the contest. As she was now unhoused and living in a car now, she aggressively beat all her opponents to win the Cybertruck. Frank tried to pull back on the winning prize, while also hosting an orgy event in the pub's basement which led to the Waitress on finding out she won't get the truck, saying she'll complain to the police. That, in turn led to the Schuylkill dumping by the gang which led to their arrest, plea bargain, and eventual community service at Abbott Elementary.

In the present, deciding that they cannot risk themselves the bad PR, they tell the woman simply "no comment". However, the woman reveals she is not a reporter, she is actually coming to Frank's orgy. Frank leads her to the basement, where some men are still staying. Noticing that she is the only woman, the Gang debate whether to tell Frank beforehand.

== Production ==
=== Development ===
In June 2025, FXX reported that the fourth episode of the seventeenth season would be titled "Thought Leadership: A Corporate Conversation", and was to be written by executive producers Charlie Day and series creator Rob McElhenney, and directed by Zachary Knighton. This was Day's 67th writing credit, McElhenney's 61st writing credit, and Knighton's first directing credit.

== Reception ==
=== Viewers ===
In its original American broadcast, "Thought Leadership: A Corporate Conversation" was seen by an estimated 0.104 million household viewers and gained a 0.03 ratings share among adults aged 18–49 in FX, and 0.127 million household viewers and gained a 0.05 ratings share among adults aged 18–49 in FXX. Combined, the episode was seen by an estimated 0.231 million household viewers and a 0.08 ratings share among adults aged 18–49. This means that 0.08 percent of all households with televisions watched the episode. This was a 25% decrease in viewership from the previous episode, which was watched by 0.304 million viewers with a 0.09 in the 18–49 demographics across its two simulcast airings.

=== Critical reviews ===
The episode received mixed reviews from critics. Ross Bonaime of The A.V. Club gave the episode an "A–" grade and wrote, "in 'Thought Leadership: A Corporate Conversation', writers Charlie Day and Rob Mac use viral subjects like slap fighting and Tesla's Cybertruck to concoct a very funny episode that feels both classic Sunny and current."

Ross Bonaime of Collider wrote, "Some of the weakest episodes this season don't lean enough into their take on different TV shows. [...] The same could be said about the show's fourth episode, 'Thought Leadership: A Corporate Conversation', which is sort of a take on Succession, but never leans far enough into that for it to entirely work."

Jerrica Tisdale of Telltale TV gave the episode a 3.3 star rating out of 5 and wrote, "Being predictable can be fun, and it shows the characters' lack of growth, which feels true to them. However, 'Thought Leadership: A Corporate Conversation' could benefit from a few surprises and from utilizing the influence of past episodes more strongly." Sam Huang of TV Fanatic gave the episode a 2.3 star rating out of 5 and wrote, "They apply the rise-and-grind mindset to Paddy's Pub with their own twisted interpretation, but the results are far from what we would expect from this long-running, successful show."
