= Overage Drinking: A National Concern =

- It's Always Sunny in Philadelphia episode
- Episode no.: Season 17; Episode 6
- Directed by: Ashly Burch
- Written by: Charlie Day; Rob McElhenney
- Cinematography by: John Tanzer
- Editing by: Josh Drisko; Steve Welch
- Production code: XIP17003
- Original air date: August 6, 2025
- Running time: 23 minutes

Guest appearances
- David Hornsby as Cricket; Andrew Friedman as Uncle Jack; Jaimie Alexander as Tammy; Robert Adamson as Trey

Episode chronology
← Previous "The Gang Goes to a Dog Track"	Next → "The Gang Gets Ready for Prime Time"
- It's Always Sunny in Philadelphia season 17

"Overage Drinking: A National Concern" is the sixth episode of the seventeenth season of the American sitcom television series It's Always Sunny in Philadelphia. It is the 176th overall episode of the series and was written by executive producers Charlie Day and series creator Rob McElhenney, and directed by Ashly Burch. It originally aired on FX and FXX on August 6, 2025.

The series follows "The Gang", a group of five misfit friends: twins Dennis and Deandra "(Sweet) Dee" Reynolds, their friends Charlie Kelly and Ronald "Mac" McDonald, and Frank Reynolds, Dennis's and Dee's legal father. The Gang runs the fictional Paddy's Pub, an unsuccessful Irish bar in South Philadelphia. In the episode, Dennis and Dee reconnect with a married couple from their past, while Charlie and Mac try to find Frank.

According to Nielsen Media Research, the episode was seen by an estimated 0.304 million household viewers and gained a 0.09 ratings share among adults aged 18–49. The episode received generally positive reviews, who praised its callbacks to the first season, although some were critical over the lack of Frank in the episode.

== Plot ==
The Gang notes that a lot of kids and teenagers are now frequenting Paddy's Pub. Two parents arrive to confront their kid, who is running away with a girl in the pub. As Dennis and Dee confront the parents, they discover that they are Trey and Tammy, now married. (Note: Previously seen in "Underage Drinking: A National Concern".) They get their son, Trey Jr., back and ask them to report them if he ever returns to the pub.

Wanting to relive their seduction attempt 20 years ago, Dennis and Dee visit Trey and Tammy at their house. However, Tammy outright tells Dennis she will not sleep with him, and Dee is bothered by the fact that Trey is doing all chores on the house. Desperate, Dennis lies to Trey Jr.'s girlfriend, Kerry, that he cheated on her, so she agrees to have sex with him as payback. Charlie convinces Mac in helping him find Frank, who has not been seen in a while, promising that this could be a "thriller" for them. While checking downtown, they run into Cricket, who claims Frank made him sign a NDA to not reveal his location. Charlie and Mac then question Jack Kelly, who helped author the NDA, who reveals that Frank named him as President for a "foundation" that Charlie does not know about.

Following a lead to a storage unit, Charlie and Mac find a tape, where Frank claims he has lived too long without a love, but the tape runs out of material, so they miss the last part. They find he took all his "dick pills", remembering that he has wanted to die while having sex. That night, Dee visits Trey Jr., intending to have sex with him, but he is uninterested in her, deeming her very old. Upset, she reveals that Dennis slept with Kerry. As Dennis and Dee argue at the bar, they are shocked by a news report, which states that Trey Jr. and Kerry attempted suicide by driving off Strawberry Mansion Bridge. As Charlie and Mac arrive, the four see another news report, revealing that Frank is set to compete in The Golden Bachelor. The "foundation" does not exist, and is simply used as a way to win sympathy for Frank, shocking the Gang.

== Production ==
=== Development ===
In July 2025, FXX reported that the sixth episode of the seventeenth season would be titled "Overage Drinking: A National Concern", and was to be written by executive producers Charlie Day and series creator Rob McElhenney, and directed by Ashly Burch. This was Day's 69th writing credit, Mac's 62nd writing credit, and Burch's first directing credit. Originally, Todd Biermann was set to direct the episode, but dropped out following the death of his brother.

== Reception ==
=== Viewers ===
In its original American broadcast, "Overage Drinking: A National Concern" was seen by an estimated 0.169 million household viewers and gained a 0.04 ratings share among adults aged 18–49 in FX, and 0.135 million household viewers and gained a 0.05 ratings share among adults aged 18–49 in FXX. Combined, the episode was seen by an estimated 0.304 million household viewers and a 0.09 ratings share among adults aged 18–49. This means that 0.09 percent of all households with televisions watched the episode. This was a 49% increase in viewership from the previous episode, which was watched by 0.204 million viewers with a 0.07 in the 18–49 demographics across its two simulcast airings.

=== Critical reviews ===
The episode received generally positive reviews from critics. Charles Papadopoulos of Screen Rant wrote, "Now, season 17 takes this a step further. It was sad when these characters were 30 and willing to go to a high school prom, but it's even worse now that they're almost 50. The It's Always Sunny Gang is the butt of its own joke, now more than ever."

Jerrica Tisdale of Telltale TV gave the episode a 4.3 star rating out of 5 and wrote, "Season 17 has been such a mixed bag thus far. However, 'Overage Drinking: A National Concern' is one of the standouts of the season. It's referential, hilarious, and gets to some of the essence of the Gang and this highly unhinged series." Sam Huang of TV Fanatic gave the episode a 2.9 star rating out of 5 and wrote, "If you're a dedicated fan, you're going to love the callbacks in It's Always Sunny in Philadelphia Season 17 Episode 6. But nostalgia aside, overall, it wasn't very memorable."
