= The Gang Gets Ready for Prime Time =

- It's Always Sunny in Philadelphia episode
- Episode no.: Season 17; Episode 7
- Directed by: Dave Chernin; John Chernin
- Written by: Charlie Day; David Hornsby; Rob Rosell
- Cinematography by: John Tanzer
- Editing by: Scott Draper
- Production code: XIP17008
- Original air date: August 13, 2025
- Running time: 24 minutes

Guest appearances
- Mary Elizabeth Ellis as The Waitress; Artemis Pebdani as Artemis; Eddie Shin as Moderator Mike; Jesse Palmer as Himself

Episode chronology
← Previous "Overage Drinking: A National Concern"	Next → "The Golden Bachelor Live"
- It's Always Sunny in Philadelphia season 17

"The Gang Gets Ready for Prime Time" is the seventh and penultimate episode of the seventeenth season of the American sitcom television series It's Always Sunny in Philadelphia. It is the 177th overall episode of the series and was written by executive producers Charlie Day, David Hornsby, and Rob Rosell, and directed by executive producers Dave Chernin and John Chernin. It originally aired on FX and FXX on August 13, 2025.

The series follows "The Gang", a group of five misfit friends: twins Dennis and Deandra "(Sweet) Dee" Reynolds, their friends Charlie Kelly and Ronald "Mac" McDonald, and Frank Reynolds, Dennis's and Dee's legal father. The Gang runs the fictional Paddy's Pub, an unsuccessful Irish bar in South Philadelphia. In the episode, the Gang sets up rehearsal dinners in order to impress The Golden Bachelor's crew, who are visiting the city to meet Frank's family and friends.

According to Nielsen Media Research, the episode was seen by an estimated 0.282 million household viewers and gained a 0.09 ratings share among adults aged 18–49. The episode received critical acclaim, with critics praising the episode's humor, originality, and performances, particularly Glenn Howerton.

== Plot ==
After finding out that Frank will appear on The Golden Bachelor, the Gang learns that a television crew will arrive to meet with Frank's family and friends. Dennis tells the Gang that they need to reassess their behavior and act out scenes in front of a focus group to practice making a good impression.

The Gang conducts a rehearsal dinner, which immediately goes awry; Charlie confuses his shampoo for Nair and arrives completely hairless, Mac recalls how he scared off a coyote by acting like one, Dee insists on telling racist jokes, and Dennis comes across as unlikeable by trying to keep the scene on track. The focus test earns a very negative response, with Dennis upset that he was named the least liked person. At the second rehearsal, Charlie wears a wig and drawn-on eyebrows and mustache, speaks in an Eastern European accent, and brings in Artemis and the Waitress to portray Frank and his date. Despite Dennis' insistence that they stick to the script, Dee continues to tell jokes and Mac (who has inadvertently dressed as Freddie Mercury) botches a backflip attempt. The test scores are more favorable, but Dennis is upset that they have become a circus.

At the third rehearsal, Dennis is even more controlling of the situation despite the crowd's demands for more comedy, and becomes unnerving to them as he has increasingly taped his face back with each rehearsal to reduce wrinkles and look younger. He delivers a monologue to the audience, begging them to see the rehearsal for what it is and explaining with an intense stutter that he needs their validation after the Gang's widely panned appearance on the game show Family Fight a decade prior. (Note: As depicted in "The Gang Goes on Family Fight".) The rehearsal still scores 3/100, prompting the Gang to give up on pandering to everyone. They realize that they have been doing the rehearsals for one month, during which time Frank and the producers never showed up, and are shocked to learn that the episode aired two weeks ago with Frank hiring actors in their place to avoid humiliation.

== Production ==
=== Development ===
In July 2025, FXX reported that the seventh episode of the seventeenth season would be titled "The Gang Gets Ready For Prime Time", and was to be written by executive producers Charlie Day, David Hornsby, and Rob Rosell, and directed by executive producers Dave Chernin and John Chernin. This was Day's 70th writing credit, Hornsby's 34th writing credit, Rosell's 27th writing credit, and the Chernins' first directing credit.

== Reception ==
=== Viewers ===
In its original American broadcast, "The Gang Gets Ready for Prime Time" was seen by an estimated 0.159 million household viewers and gained a 0.04 ratings share among adults aged 18–49 in FX, and 0.123 million household viewers and gained a 0.05 ratings share among adults aged 18–49 in FXX. Combined, the episode was seen by an estimated 0.282 million household viewers and a 0.09 ratings share among adults aged 18–49. This means that 0.09 percent of all households with televisions watched the episode. This was an 8% decrease in viewership from the previous episode, which was watched by 0.304 million viewers with a 0.09 in the 18–49 demographics across its two simulcast airings.

=== Critical reviews ===
The episode received critical acclaim. Ross Bonaime of Collider wrote, "Just as great is the penultimate episode, where The Gang prepares to appear on The Golden Bachelor, in 'The Gang Gets Ready for Prime Time.' In doing this, they put themselves under a focus group to find the 'perfect version' of themselves, one that appeals to the widest audience and will offend no one, which, they point out, is where great art comes from. Even after all these years, The Gang obviously shows that they are never going to be ready for primetime."

Charles Papadopoulos of Screen Rant wrote, "'The Gang Gets Ready for Prime Time' is an instant classic, scoring the highest in It's Always Sunny season 17 by a significant margin, due to its laugh-out-loud absurd humor and genuine approach to classic character dynamics."

Jerrica Tisdale of Telltale TV gave the episode a 4.5 star rating out of 5 and wrote, "'The Gang Gets Ready for Prime Time' is simply a hilarious episode that takes elements from previous ones and elevates them into a unique premise. It just works." Sam Huang of TV Fanatic gave the episode a 4.5 star rating out of 5 and wrote, "While Frank isn't featured in this episode, the Gang plays off each other incredibly well. Even though the premise of the Gang simply hosting a dinner party and testing out their likeability is pretty basic, there's never a dull moment on the screen."

=== Accolades ===
TVLine named Glenn Howerton as an honorable mention for the "Performer of the Week" for the week of August 16, 2025, for his performance in the episode. The site wrote, "It's Always Sunny in Philadelphia keeps quietly chugging along in its 17th season, and Glenn Howerton keeps quietly delivering one of the most riotously funny performances on TV as constantly frustrated egomaniac Dennis. This week, Dennis couldn't believe that a focus group saw him as “the angry guy with an old face,” and Howerton poured on the desperation as Dennis applied an excess of wrinkle-reducing face tape to look younger. That only led to him looking like a “vampire,” the focus group decided, and it all culminated, hilariously, in a frozen-faced Dennis defending himself to the focus group in a creepy Count Dracula voice and insisting that he is “refined and dignified and not the least bit abnormal in any way.” The more Dennis begged for their approval, the more we giggled... and appreciated the way Howerton continues to find new ways for Dennis to surprise and delight us, even 17 seasons in."
