= The Golden Bachelor Live =

- It's Always Sunny in Philadelphia episode
- Episode no.: Season 17; Episode 8
- Directed by: Todd Biermann
- Written by: Charlie Day; Rob McElhenney
- Cinematography by: John Tanzer
- Editing by: Scott Draper
- Production code: XIP17006
- Original air date: August 20, 2025
- Running time: 26 minutes

Guest appearances
- Jesse Palmer as Himself; Audrey Corsa as Sarah (Cock Chewa); Lynne Marie Stewart as Bonnie Kelly; Carol Kane as Sam

Episode chronology
← Previous "The Gang Gets Ready for Prime Time"	Next → "Frank Marries a Corpse"
- It's Always Sunny in Philadelphia season 17

"The Golden Bachelor Live" is the eighth episode and season finale of the seventeenth season of the American sitcom television series It's Always Sunny in Philadelphia. It is the 178th overall episode of the series and was written by executive producers Charlie Day and series creator Rob McElhenney, and directed by Todd Biermann. It originally aired on FX and FXX on August 20, 2025.

The series follows "The Gang", a group of five misfit friends: twins Dennis and Deandra "(Sweet) Dee" Reynolds, their friends Charlie Kelly and Ronald "Mac" McDonald, and Frank Reynolds, Dennis's and Dee's legal father. The Gang runs the fictional Paddy's Pub, an unsuccessful Irish bar in South Philadelphia. In the episode, Frank participates in The Golden Bachelor to finally find a new love in his life.

According to Nielsen Media Research, the episode was seen by an estimated 285 thousand household viewers and gained a 0.08 ratings share among adults aged 18–49. The episode received critical acclaim, with critics praising the episode's originality, humor, and emotional tone.

== Plot ==
The episode is presented as a season finale of The Golden Bachelor, hosted by Jesse Palmer. Frank has been selected as the Bachelor, but is very disappointed when he finds that the candidates are all seniors his age. Palmer gives in to his demand to ask a young TikTok personality, Cock "Chewy" Chewa, to arrive in limo. Frank also has an interest in one senior candidate named Sam, so he is left with two possible dates.

Due to this, the show is forced to retool the season. Discovering that Frank used actors to pretend to be his family, Frank is forced to introduce Chewy and Sam to the Gang. Dennis and Dee are convinced that Sam is only after Frank for his fortune, so Dennis invites Bonnie as a third candidate for Frank, upsetting Charlie. Sam opens her heart to Frank, explaining that she finally found true love with him. She believes she finally won him over, until Frank slips a note that simply says "dunzo".

Mac, thinking Frank is going to pick Chewy, decides to see if she is cool by detonating an elephant's toothpaste bomb in the mansion, a viral prank he saw online. However, unwilling to let Frank date his mom and to let Chewy stay with them, Charlie pours 20 gallons of Nair in the concoction, but the Gang itself ends up affected instead, making them appear in the audience green and balding with their voices messed up. In the end, Frank must give the final rose to either Bonnie or Chewy, but he chooses neither. He goes to a bus station in the rain to meet with Sam, admitting that he got her out because he loves her and he was afraid. He gives her the rose, asking her to marry him. She accepts, and they passionately kiss.

== Production ==
=== Development ===
In July 2025, FXX reported that the eighth episode of the seventeenth season would be titled "The Golden Bachelor Live", and was to be written by executive producers Charlie Day and series creator Rob McElhenney, and directed by Todd Biermann. This was Day's 71st writing credit, Mac's 63rd writing credit, and Biermann's 18th directing credit.

=== Writing ===
The idea for the episode came up between August and September 2024, as the writers were coming up with ideas for the season. Kaitlin Olson started watching The Golden Bachelor, with Rob McElhenney seeing potential in a crossover, "Wouldn't it be fun if we had a crossover event with Abbott Elementary but then did another crossover? Because that seems like the very Sunny thing to do, which is to double down on the ridiculousness." Mac presented the idea to ABC Entertainment executive Robert Mills, who approved the episode. Jesse Palmer, who hosts the reality show, also guest stars in the episode. Palmer was a fan of the series, and admitted surprise when he was given the script, to the point that he contacted ABC to make sure they greenlit the episode. He said, "The hardest part of acting with them was trying to keep a straight face the whole time, because they improv and just go off script. It is so funny."

=== Casting ===
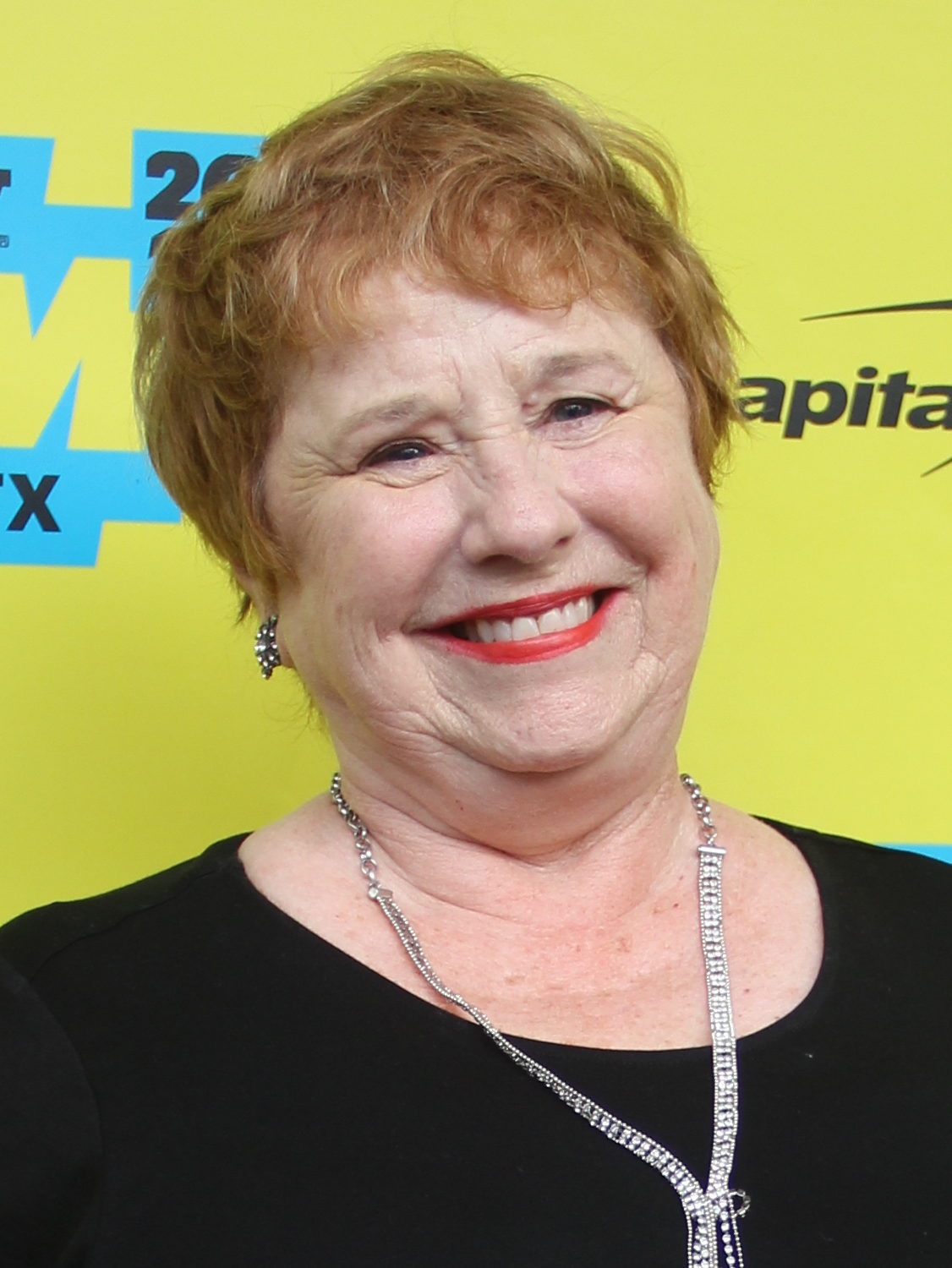
The episode marked Lynne Marie Stewart's final appearance in the series.

The episode featured a guest appearance by Lynne Marie Stewart, who has played Bonnie Kelly since the first season, marking her final appearance in the series following her death on February 21, 2025. The episode was dedicated to her memory.

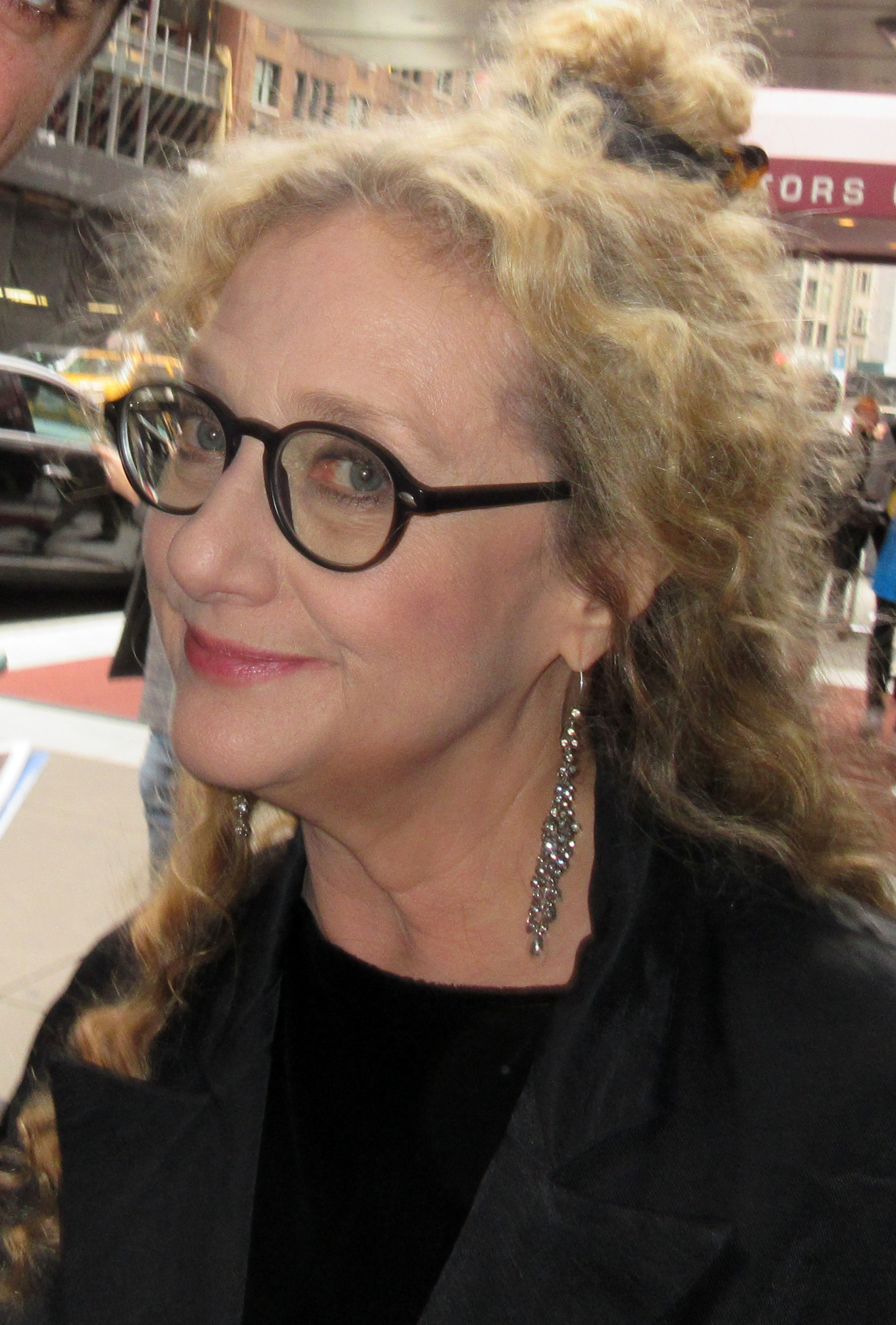
Carol Kane guest stars in the episode, reuniting her with her Taxi co-star, Danny DeVito.

Carol Kane also guest stars in the episode as Sam, a potential romantic candidate for Frank. Kane previously starred alongside Danny DeVito in the sitcom Taxi. DeVito commented, "You're always looking for ways where, you know, if there's somebody in your arena that you can coerce into being on the show. This was perfect, this part was perfect for her and she loved it and they loved her and that was, that was a gift." He was very interested in having a new romantic partner for Frank, "I am way down with that. I mean, you get up there in age, it’s nice to have a steady girlfriend."

=== Filming ===
Mac screened the season premiere and finale of The Golden Bachelor to the crew, so they could get an idea of how to structure the episode. The series was given access to the franchise's set in Agoura Hills, California, while the audience studio was built in a soundstage. After collaborating with The Golden Bachelor's crew, the series used the same lighting design, camera models, and lens package to further mimic the reality show's look. The episode was filmed over 5 days in mid-November 2024, which was half a day longer than usual for an average episode of the series.

Todd Biermann added, "We are trying to do a version, with our own spin, of their shows. Obviously, The Golden Bachelor does not generally lead with someone who could be considered one of the worst men of his generation. It's like, ‘Imagine the worst guy in the world being on The Golden Bachelor,’ and just going there."

== Reception ==
=== Viewers ===
In its original American broadcast, "The Golden Bachelor Live" was seen by an estimated 0.179 million household viewers and gained a 0.04 ratings share among adults aged 18–49 in FX, and 0.106 million household viewers and gained a 0.04 ratings share among adults aged 18–49 in FXX. Combined, the episode was seen by an estimated 0.285 million household viewers and a 0.08 ratings share among adults aged 18–49. This means that 0.08 percent of all households with televisions watched the episode. This was a slight increase in viewership from the previous episode, which was watched by 0.282 million viewers with a 0.09 in the 18–49 demographics across its two simulcast airings.

=== Critical reviews ===
The episode received critical acclaim. Brian Tallerico of The A.V. Club gave it a "B" grade and wrote, "It's tempting to ask what took so long to get these legends back together on Sunny, but it works so well here that it feels worth the wait. Somehow their friendship comes through in the show, sliding back into the comic chemistry they honed so many years ago."

Ross Bonaime of Collider wrote, "As the trailer also shows, yes, Frank Reynolds does go on The Golden Bachelor, and it's as great as you'd imagine. The final episode of the season, 'The Golden Bachelor Live', adopts the look and feel of that show, complete with a gobsmacked Jesse Palmer unsure of what to do with Frank."

Charles Papadopoulos of Screen Rant wrote, "It's Always Sunny season 17's themes were focused on Paddy's Pub in the corporate world, and the details about her wealth shouldn't go unnoticed. Maybe Samantha's money is the key to the international Paddy's franchise." Danielle Ryan of /Film wrote, "The end of the episode presents the opportunity for Sam to return in season 18, and that could be an amazing change-up in the Always Sunny world, going into what's potentially the end."

Jerrica Tisdale of Telltale TV gave the episode a 4.5 star rating out of 5 and wrote, "Overall, 'The Golden Bachelor Live' may end up making the list of best Sunny episodes ever. We'll have to see where this one lands in the history books, but the future looks promising. It's a very strong ending for the season." Sam Huang of TV Fanatic gave the episode a 4.2 star rating out of 5 and wrote, "Overall, I'm very happy that the season ended on this episode. It makes the build-up of the previous episodes worthwhile. While I thought the majority of the season was just okay, the season finale did a fantastic job of being a pleasantly surprising, solid ending."

=== Accolades ===
TVLine named Danny DeVito and Carol Kane as honorable mentions for the "Performer of the Week" for the week of August 23, 2025, for their performances in the episode. The site wrote, "The great Danny DeVito was in rare form in It's Always Sunny in Philadelphia's season finale, with Frank starring in a new season of The Golden Bachelor by instantly rejecting any woman close to his own age — Mel Owens, is that you? — and saying some truly foul things that ABC would never air. But Frank met his match in Sam, played by guest star Carol Kane, who went toe-to-toe with Frank and actually charmed him, despite being way outside his dating demographic. The two former castmates showed off serious chemistry as Frank and Sam enjoyed a sweet (if gross) candlelit dinner, and it all led up to a sweepingly romantic marriage proposal at a bus stop in the rain. Kane proved to be the perfect sparring partner for DeVito, and we'd love to see these two continue to insult each other for many seasons to come."
