= It's Always Sunny in Philadelphia season 17 =

2025 season of American television series

It's Always Sunny in Philadelphia
- Season 17
- Promotional poster
- Starring: Charlie Day; Glenn Howerton; Rob McElhenney; Kaitlin Olson; Danny DeVito
- No. of episodes: 8

Release
- Original network: FXX; FX
- Original release: July 9 – August 20, 2025

Season chronology
- ← Previous; Season 16 Next → Season 18

The seventeenth season of the American television sitcom series It's Always Sunny in Philadelphia premiered on FXX on July 9 and concluded on August 20, 2025, consisting of eight episodes. Episodes were simulcast on FX and had same night availability on the FXNOW website, and next day availability on Hulu. The season stars Charlie Day, Glenn Howerton, Rob McElhenney, Kaitlin Olson, and Danny DeVito as "the Gang". In December 2020, after the fourteenth season aired, It's Always Sunny in Philadelphia was renewed for four additional seasons. Filming took place from October to December 2024.

== Cast ==
=== Main cast ===
- Charlie Day as Charlie Kelly
- Glenn Howerton as Dennis Reynolds
- Rob McElhenney as Ronald "Mac" McDonald
- Kaitlin Olson as Deandra "Dee" ("Sweet Dee") Reynolds
- Danny DeVito as Frank Reynolds

=== Special guest cast ===
- Quinta Brunson as Janine Teagues
- Sheryl Lee Ralph as Barbara Howard
- Tyler James Williams as Gregory Eddie
- Janelle James as Ava Coleman
- Chris Perfetti as Jacob Hill
- Lisa Ann Walter as Melissa Schemmenti
- William Stanford Davis as Mr. Johnson
- Brian Unger as The Lawyer

=== Recurring cast ===
- Mary Elizabeth Ellis as The Waitress
- Lynne Marie Stewart as Bonnie Kelly

=== Guest cast ===
- Alex Wolff as Simon
- Audrey Wasilewski as Nurse
- Grayson Berry as Sparky
- Marlon Young as Louis
- David Hornsby as Matthew "Rickety Cricket" Mara
- Andrew Friedman as Uncle Jack
- Jaimie Alexander as Tammy
- Robert Adamson as Trey
- Artemis Pebdani as Artemis
- Eddie Shin as Moderator Mike
- Jesse Palmer as Himself
- Audrey Corsa as Cock Chewa
- Carol Kane as Sam

== Production ==
=== Development ===
After the fourteenth season aired, It's Always Sunny in Philadelphia was renewed for four additional seasons in December 2020, intending to take it up to season 18. At the 75th Primetime Emmy Awards, series creator and showrunner Rob McElhenney and Quinta Brunson, the creator and star of the ABC sitcom Abbott Elementary, began developing a crossover between the two series, which was later approved by the Walt Disney Company CEO Bob Iger.

=== Writing ===
On August 4, 2024, Charlie Day posted on Instagram that the writers' room would start working on the season in the following week. The writing team for the season includes Mac, Day, David Hornsby, Javi Scott, Nina Pedrad, and Keyonna Taylor.

=== Filming ===
According to star Danny DeVito, filming for the season was expected to begin in September 2024. By October 16, it was announced via Instagram that filming had begun. On December 4, it was announced that filming for the season had finished.

== Episodes ==
| No. overall | No. in season | Title | Directed by | Written by | Original release date | Prod. code | US viewers (millions) (Note: Combined viewership on FXX and FX.) |
|---|---|---|---|---|---|---|---|
| 171 | 1 | "The Gang F***s Up Abbott Elementary" | Todd Biermann | Charlie Day & Rob McElhenney & Keyonna Taylor | July 9, 2025 | XIP17005 | 0.355 |
Ava Coleman, the principal of Abbott Elementary, reveals extra footage of the Gang's "community service". Note: This episode concludes a crossover event that begins on Abbott Elementary season 4 episode 9.
| 172 | 2 | "Frank Is in a Coma" | Imani Hakim | Dave Chernin & John Chernin | July 9, 2025 | XIP17007 | 0.274 |
Frank ends up in a coma, resulting in Dennis, Mac, and Charlie reevaluating their future and pitching a new business idea, while Dee goes through the five stages of grief.
| 173 | 3 | "Mac and Dennis Become EMTs" | Heath Cullens | Charlie Day & Rob McElhenney & Nina Pedrad | July 16, 2025 | XIP17002 | 0.304 |
Amid an obsession with peppers, Frank accidentally poisons a man, causing Dennis and Mac to decide to become EMTs, while the others set up a food delivery system.
| 174 | 4 | "Thought Leadership: A Corporate Conversation" | Zachary Knighton | Charlie Day & Rob McElhenney | July 23, 2025 | XIP17004 | 0.231 |
When a scheme involving slap fights and a cybertruck goes horribly wrong, the Gang debate which of them is to blame for it. The flashback in this episode leads to the crossover with Abbott Elementary.
| 175 | 5 | "The Gang Goes to a Dog Track" | Heath Cullens | Charlie Day & Ross Maloney | July 30, 2025 | XIP17001 | 0.204 |
Frank tricks the Gang into going to a dog track, where Dennis and Dee become drawn into gambling, while Mac and Charlie meet a philosophical dog-obsessed janitor.
| 176 | 6 | "Overage Drinking: A National Concern" | Ashly Burch | Charlie Day & Rob McElhenney | August 6, 2025 | XIP17003 | 0.304 |
Dennis and Dee attempt to create a teen drama by seducing a couple they met in high school, while Mac and Charlie, searching for a missing Frank, see themselves in a thriller.
| 177 | 7 | "The Gang Gets Ready for Prime Time" | Dave Chernin & John Chernin | Charlie Day & David Hornsby & Rob Rosell | August 13, 2025 | XIP17008 | 0.282 |
After Frank is chosen to appear on The Golden Bachelor, the Gang does a focus group of the dinner to prepare for being filmed.
| 178 | 8 | "The Golden Bachelor Live" | Todd Biermann | Charlie Day & Rob McElhenney | August 20, 2025 | XIP17006 | 0.285 |
The season of The Golden Bachelor featuring Frank is shown. This episode is dedicated to Lynne Marie Stewart.

== Release ==
The season premiered with two episodes on July 9, 2025.

== Reception ==
On Rotten Tomatoes, the season has an approval rating of 84% based on 13 reviews with an average score of 7.45/10. The website's critics' consensus is, "Unlike Paddy's merry band of morons, It's Always Sunny in Philadelphia remains sharp and spry in its advanced age."
