= Mac and Dennis Become EMTs =

- It's Always Sunny in Philadelphia episode
- Episode no.: Season 17; Episode 3
- Directed by: Heath Cullens
- Written by: Charlie Day; Rob McElhenney; Nina Pedrad
- Cinematography by: John Tanzer
- Editing by: Scott Draper
- Production code: XIP17002
- Original air date: July 16, 2025
- Running time: 22 minutes

Guest appearances
- Brian Unger as The Lawyer (special guest star)

Episode chronology
← Previous "Frank Is in a Coma"	Next → "Thought Leadership: A Corporate Conversation"
- It's Always Sunny in Philadelphia season 17

"Mac and Dennis Become EMTs" is the third episode of the seventeenth season of the American sitcom television series It's Always Sunny in Philadelphia. It is the 173rd overall episode of the series and was written by executive producers Charlie Day, series creator Rob McElhenney, and Nina Pedrad, and directed by co-executive producer Heath Cullens. It originally aired on FX and FXX on July 16, 2025.

The series follows "The Gang", a group of five misfit friends: twins Dennis and Deandra "(Sweet) Dee" Reynolds, their friends Charlie Kelly and Ronald "Mac" McDonald, and Frank Reynolds, Dennis's and Dee's legal father. The Gang runs the fictional Paddy's Pub, an unsuccessful Irish bar in South Philadelphia. In the episode, Dennis and Mac decide to become EMTs, while Frank faces a possible lawsuit after accidentally poisoning a man.

According to Nielsen Media Research, the episode was seen by an estimated 0.304 million household viewers and gained a 0.10 ratings share among adults aged 18–49. The episode received mixed reviews, with critics divided over the episode's loose narrative.

== Plot ==
A man collapses at Paddy's Pub, which leads to him being taken away by EMT officers. Dee has started working at a Postmates-like food service and delivers food to Frank, who believes the man had a heart attack because he gave him a hot chili pepper. Fascinated by the adrenaline and thrills, Mac and Dennis decide they could become EMTs.

Frank visits the man, who has stayed in coma at the hospital. Suddenly, the Lawyer appears, now forced to wear an eyepatch after the incident at the courthouse. (Note: As depicted in "McPoyle vs. Ponderosa: The Trial of the Century".) He represents the man, and he is intending to face Frank in court after he just admitted to poisoning him with a chili pepper. Frank then works with Charlie in creating a burger with the same chili, which should prove Frank's innocence. When Dee arrives with another order for Frank, she takes an interest in Charlie's burger and suggests they could team up to help her work faster.

Mac and Dennis begin to "microdose" Charlie's chili pepper during a EMT class, causing them to ignore the officer in charge. They choose to refund the classes and buy a decommissioned ambulance to start their routines. They employ reckless and dangerous methods, but they are still praised for saving many people. As the Gang continues ingesting more of the chili pepper, they decide to team up, using the ambulance to transport Dee and Charlie's kitchen. Frank confronts the lawyer with a bowl of super hot chili to prove his innocence, just as Dee arrives with a burger he ordered. When the lawyer refuses to eat any of it, they eat it in spite, but they end up getting burn out, to the lawyer's enjoyment.

As they continue reaching the maximum amount of chili pepper, Mac and Dennis are called to a snake bite alert, but they are disappointed to learn that it is actually Frank and Dee calling them to help them. The lawyer continues laughing at the situation and drinks from a cup that Frank brought, with Frank revealing that it contains juiced Carolina Reaper tea. When the lawyer starts severely coughing, they are forced to take him to the hospital. En route, their arguments cause the ambulance to crash. The Gang flees and leaves the lawyer behind donning the EMT uniform. At a courthouse, the lawyer is found guilty of the Gang's illegal activities and sentenced to 30 days in a correctional facility.

== Production ==
=== Development ===
In June 2025, FXX reported that the third episode of the seventeenth season would be titled "Mac and Dennis Become EMTs", and was to be written by executive producers Charlie Day, series creator Rob McElhenney, and Nina Pedrad, and directed by co-executive producer Heath Cullens. This was Day's 66th writing credit, McElhenney's 60th writing credit, Pedrad's third writing credit, and Cullens' 14th directing credit.

=== Casting ===
In June 2025, it was revealed in a trailer for the season that Brian Unger would return as The Lawyer, after his last appearance in "McPoyle vs. Ponderosa: The Trial of the Century". Unger said that Rob McElhenney and the writers often wrote episodes that would bring him back during the nine-year gap, but they were not satisfied with the scripts.

== Reception ==
=== Viewers ===
In its original American broadcast, "Mac and Dennis Become EMTs" was seen by an estimated 0.172 million household viewers and gained a 0.04 ratings share among adults aged 18–49 in FX, and 0.132 million household viewers and gained a 0.05 ratings share among adults aged 18–49 in FXX. Combined, the episode was seen by an estimated 0.304 million household viewers and a 0.09 ratings share among adults aged 18–49. This means that 0.09 percent of all households with televisions watched the episode. This was a slight decrease in viewership from the previous episode, which was watched by 0.274 million viewers with a 0.10 in the 18–49 demographics across its two simulcast airings.

=== Critical reviews ===
“Mac and Dennis Become EMTs” received mixed reviews from critics. Ross Bonaime of Collider wrote, "The third episode, 'Mac and Dennis Become EMTs', is the series' attempt at taking on The Bear, but it all feels a bit too scattered, as Mac and Dennis decide to become EMTs, mostly for the hell of it, Charlie becomes a smash burger chef, and Dee starts a side-hustle doing food delivery. And the whole gang gets addicted to spicy peppers, which obviously doesn't end well. It's a fun conceit that definitely has its moments, but it's not as tight as some of the other episodes."

Jerrica Tisdale of Telltale TV gave the episode a 3 star rating out of 5 and wrote, "Overall, 'Mac and Dennis Become EMTs' may not rank high in the show's best work. It just feels a bit too chaotic in a not-funny way. The team behind the show takes a chance, and it doesn't necessarily land, but the bold choices are appreciated."

Akos Peterbencze of /Film wrote, "it shows the gang is still capable of innovating and keeping things fresh, furthering the type of obscene and dark humor they become a champion at two decades ago. A fan-favorite character we haven't seen in nine years also returns here and delivers spectacularly. In the end, it all comes full circle, proving that Always Sunny still has gas left in the tank and isn't ready to call it quits just yet." Sam Huang of TV Fanatic gave the episode a 2.9 star rating out of 5 and wrote, "To its credit, It's Always Sunny in Philadelphia Season 17 Episode 3, 'Mac and Dennis Become EMTs', brings the classic chaotic energy of the series back. It's just a shame that the episode fails to make any sort of coherent point, other than suggesting you pay attention to your spice tolerance. All in all, the episode was pretty enjoyable, even if some of the running jokes didn't quite land."
