= The Cool Kids (TV series) =

American sitcom

- Genre: Sitcom
- Created by: Charlie Day; Paul Fruchbom
- Starring: David Alan Grier; Martin Mull; Leslie Jordan; Vicki Lawrence
- Music by: Cormac Bluestone
- Country of origin: United States
- Original language: English
- No. of seasons: 1
- No. of episodes: 22

Production
- Executive producers: Charlie Day; Patrick Walsh; Kevin Abbott (pilot); Nicholas Frenkel; Don Scardino
- Cinematography: Donald A. Morgan; Christian La Fountaine
- Editors: Andy Zall; Brent Carpenter; Jim Miley
- Camera setup: Multi-camera
- Running time: 21–22 minutes
- Production companies: RCG Productions; Nest Egg Productions (pilot); Enrico Pallazzo (episode 2–22); 3 Arts Entertainment; FXP; 20th Century Fox Television

Original release
- Network: Fox
- Release: September 28, 2018 – May 10, 2019

The Cool Kids is an American television sitcom created by Charlie Day and Paul Fruchbom for Fox. Starring David Alan Grier, Martin Mull, Leslie Jordan, and Vicki Lawrence, the series follows three male residents of a retirement community who are forced to adapt to the arrival of a new, rebellious female occupant. On October 19, 2018, it was announced that Fox had ordered an additional nine episodes of the series, bringing the first season total up to twenty-two episodes. On May 10, 2019, The Cool Kids was canceled by Fox after one season.

The Cool Kids is a joint production by 3 Arts Entertainment, FXP, and 20th Century Fox Television.

== Premise ==
The Cool Kids follows three male senior citizen friends at Shady Meadows Retirement Community who "are the top dogs until they're blown out of the water by the newest member of the community, a female rebel who's ready to challenge their place – it's high school with 70 somethings."

== Cast and characters ==
=== Main ===
- David Alan Grier as Hank Henderson, the leader of the group at Shady Meadows Retirement Community
- Martin Mull as Charlie
- Leslie Jordan as Sidney "Sid" Delacroix
- Vicki Lawrence as Margaret Flynn

=== Recurring ===
- Jamie Farr as Dudley, a resident at Shady Meadows Retirement Community whom the gang finds annoying
- Artemis Pebdani as Allison, the head of Shady Meadows Retirement Community
- Lesley Ann Warren as Kathleen, Charlie's girlfriend
- Jere Burns as John, Sid's ex-boyfriend
- Rod McCary as Gorgeous George, a resident at Shady Meadows Retirement Community
- Punam Patel as Punam, an employee of the Shady Meadows Retirement Community

=== Guest ===
- Charlie Day as Chet ("Pilot"), the Shady Meadows Retirement Community handyman
- Megan Ferguson as Jennifer ("Margaret Turns 65")
- Ravi Patel as Doctor Chad ("Sid Comes Out"), a doctor at the Shady Meadows Retirement Community
- Max Gail as Robert ("Sid Comes Out"), one of Margaret's love interests
- Travis Schuldt as Walt Delacroix ("Sid Comes Out"), Sid's son
- Charles Shaughnessy as Murray ("Thanksgiving at Murray's")
- Julia Duffy as Francine ("Thanksgiving at Murray's")
- Clyde Kusatsu as Norman ("Thanksgiving at Murray's")
- Tammy Townsend as Felicia ("Hank the Cradle Robber"), a younger woman who Hank briefly dates
- Ed Begley Jr. as Karl ("Margaret Dates the Zodiac Killer"), a creepy man at the Shady Meadows Retirement Community who Margaret dates and suspects to be the Zodiac Killer
- Jackée Harry as Lorraine ("Funeral Crashers" and "Vegas Baby!"), Hank's ex-wife
- Rick Fox as Reggie ("Funeral Crashers" and "Vegas Baby!"), Lorraine's boyfriend
- Bob Gunton as Colonel Christianson ("Funeral Crashers")
- Erik Kilpatrick as Albert ("Charlie's Angel")
- Mary Elizabeth Ellis as Margaret "MJ" Flynn Jr. ("Margaret Jr."), Margaret's daughter
- Joanna Cassidy as Joanie ("The Cool Kids Plus One"), Margaret's best friend
- Jake Ryan as Ernie ("Mentors")
- Stephen Tobolowsky as Leonard ("Margaret Ups Her Game")
- Patrick Duffy as Gene ("Margaret Ups Her Game")
- Jennifer Coolidge as Bonnie Delacroix ("Sid's Ex-Wife"), Sid's ex-wife, with whom he maintains a great relationship after their separation
- Jon Lovitz as Kip Samgood ("Kip Samgood's Biggest Fan"), Sid's teen idol who performed a song Margaret originally wrote
- Robert Pine as Richard McCormick ("Indecent Proposal")
- Carolyn Hennesy as Annie McCormick ("Indecent Proposal")
- Tony Rock as Tony ("Vegas Baby!"), Hank and Lorraine's son
- Lynne Marie Stewart as Judy ("The Friend-aversary")

== Episodes ==
No.	Title	Directed by	Written by	Original release date	Prod. code	U.S. viewers (millions)
1	"Pilot"	Don Scardino	Charlie Day & Paul Fruchbom	September 28, 2018	1LBA01	6.87
Three friends living in a retirement community – Hank, Charlie, and Sid – mourn the loss of their recently deceased friend Jerry. New resident Margaret sits in Jerry's seat, upsetting Hank. Coupled with being unsatisfied by the way the staff is handling Jerry's death, Hank tries to get Margaret to sit elsewhere, but his plan backfires when Sid and Charlie befriend her. After learning Jerry will be cremated, the men take up Margaret's offer to drive them to the mortuary to “rescue” him, but are arrested when it turns out Margaret stole the car from another resident. In the end, Hank decides it is best to let Jerry go, and find that Margaret has thrown a farewell party Jerry would have wanted. Impressed, the friends officially welcome Margaret as Jerry's successor.
2	"Margaret Turns 65"	Anthony Rich	Sophia Lear	October 5, 2018	1LBA04	4.90
Margaret is feeling moody due to it being her 65th birthday, and lashes out at the boys. To make themselves all feel young, Hank takes the gang to his old hangout, Ronnie's Swing Time Café. But when they arrive, they find the café has been long gone, and converted into a nightclub called TwerkLab. After sneaking into the club, Hank, Charlie, and Margaret all have interactions that make them feel insulted and old. After reflection, the gang agrees that Millennials suck, and celebrate Margaret's birthday by taking shots – which carries into the next day with a hangover for everyone.
3	"A Date with Destiny"	Robbie Countryman	Allison Bosma & Jon DeWalt	October 12, 2018	1LBA03	4.77
Margaret and Sid encourage Hank and Charlie to sign up for online dating. But while Hank is a hit, Charlie is sad that no one is responding to his profile. To make him feel better, Margaret creates a fake account named “Nadine” and Sid creates another one named “Destiny” behind her back, Charlie and Hank (who lied about having many responses) like the sexually explicit messages Destiny sends, and problems arise when Charlie and Hank begin fighting over Destiny. Figuring out that Sid is actually Destiny, Charlie and Hank pretend to have a fight to teach them a lesson.
4	"Sid Comes Out"	Eric Dean Seaton	Charlie Kelly	October 19, 2018	1LBA05	4.64
Sid's son Walt surprises him with a visit, and Margaret is both shocked and amused to find out that Walt thinks his father is straight. But the joke is on her when Walt believes she is Sid's girlfriend. After a disastrous lunch date with Walt – which Margaret's new boyfriend Robert interrupts – Sid finally comes out to a dumbfounded Walt, who is happy for his father. Meanwhile, Hank needs to take an eye test to renew his golf cart license, and enlists Charlie to help him cheat his way through. However, Charlie's way of helping is painful, and they are caught by the doctor. Although the doctor accepts Hank's bribe of $200 to pass him, Hank ends up losing his license after driving the golf cart into the dining room.
5	"The Cool Kids Rig an Election"	Phill Lewis	Patrick Walsh	November 2, 2018	1LBA02	4.27
Tired of the home's activities coordinator Gorgeous George, who has let the title go to his head, Margaret convinces the boys to put up an opponent in the upcoming election at the home. Hank declares the candidate to be Charlie, but Margaret forces Sid to run against both George and Charlie. After Charlie and Sid eat a lasagna meant for George that Hank laced with mushrooms, and Margaret locked George in the exercise room to keep him from showing up to the elections, Hank and Margaret run against each other. An escaped George is injured when Sid (still high from the mushrooms) tackles him at the election, and ends up files a restraining order against the four; the election is cancelled, and the position is given to an employee who sold Hank the mushrooms.
6	"TV Heist"	Katy Garretson	Michael Lisbe & Nate Reger	November 9, 2018	1LBA06	4.52
Hank finds out his ex-wife is remarrying the man she left him for, and is devastated when he loses a contest for a 65-inch television to Gorgeous George, who bought a bag full of raffle tickets. An empathetic Margaret (who has been in the same position regarding the ex-spouse) convinces Charlie and Sid to go along with a day of doing whatever Hank wants — and Hank decides to steal the TV from Allison's office. But the plan — which Hank dubs "Hank's Eleven" — goes awry: Sid gets stuck in the sauna with Allison, who is depressed her sister is getting married; Hank gets upset that the gang is only doing it out of pity for him, although he claims to be okay with his ex moving on; and Charlie, who bought a tank of laughing gas for the escape (to the annoyance of Margaret and Hank), accidentally opens the tank — causing Hank to ruin the TV. Hank realizes that he is still upset about his ex-wife's affair, and decides to move on as well.
7	"Thanksgiving at Murray's"	Fred Savage	Paul Fruchbom	November 16, 2018	1LBA07	4.38
When Margaret scores an invite to an exclusive foodie potluck for Thanksgiving, she takes Sid as her plus one, leaving Hank and Charlie to find a backup plan.
8	"Hank the Cradle Robber"	Phill Lewis	Luvh Rakhe	December 7, 2018	1LBA08	4.35
When Hank starts dating a much younger woman, the gang suspects she may be a gold-digger taking advantage of him because of his age. But after rifling through her things, they fear this relationship could be something much worse - a pregnancy trap.
9	"Margaret Dates the Zodiac Killer"	Jonathan Judge	Conor Galvin	December 14, 2018	1LBA09	4.16
Margaret begins dating Karl (Ed Begley Jr.), a fellow Shady Meadows resident, whom the guys think may be the Zodiac Killer. Margaret finds the accusation ridiculous, but begins wondering whether or not it may be true. Meanwhile, the guys look for the person who does not flush in the men's bathroom.
10	"Funeral Crashers"	Fred Savage	Allison Bosma & Jon DeWalt	January 4, 2019	1LBA13	4.28
The group attend a funeral for Hank's friend Dana, whom his ex-wife Lorraine (Jackée Harry) was friends with as well. Hank faces off Lorraine, but considers reconciling when he discovers her relationship with the man she left Hank for is on the rocks. Meanwhile, Sid and Charlie come to mingle and get free food, but are mistaken for Air Force buddies of the deceased's widower.
11	"Charlie's Angel"	Katy Garretson	Maxwell Theodore Vivian	January 11, 2019	1LBA11	4.78
When Charlie falls for Kathleen (Lesley Ann Warren), Margaret tries to help Charlie by attending the group Kathleen runs. Little do the divorcees know that it's a bereavement support group. Meanwhile, Hank gets stage fright while volunteering to host a close-circuit TV show at Shady Meadows. When Sid fills in for him sharing gossip from the retirement community, Hank becomes jealous.
12	"Margaret Jr."	Fred Savage	Sophia Lear	February 1, 2019	1LBA12	4.65
Margaret's daughter, MJ (Mary Elizabeth Ellis), comes to Shady Meadows after breaking up with her boyfriend. Hank suspects that MJ is attempting to take advantage of Margaret, who bends over backwards to help her out of guilt for divorcing her father. Meanwhile, when Sid goes through Charlie's sloppy apartment looking for his wok, he resolves to help Charlie become less of a hoarder — which is easier said than done.
13	"Sid's First Relationship"	Jonathan Judge	Luvh Rakhe	February 22, 2019	1LBA14	3.80
The gang rallies around Sid to help him through his commitment issues to new beau John. Meanwhile, Margaret attempts to conquer her fear of flying by volunteering at the airport, but soon finds herself working besides Hank.
14	"The Cool Kids Plus One"	Phill Lewis	Michael Lisbe & Nate Reger	March 1, 2019	1LBA15	4.08
Margaret neglects the guys when her best friend, Joanie (Joanna Cassidy), comes to visit. The guys immediately dislike Joanie, and even more so when she announces she's moving to Shady Meadows. The guys devise a plan to convince her not to, but Hank ends up sleeping with her. A disgusted Margaret eventually gets her to change her mind, while still remaining friends.
15	"Mentors"	Fred Savage	Heather Flanders	March 8, 2019	1LBA16	3.85
As Hank and Margaret mentor an awkward high school student and help him decide on whether or not to go to the prom, Hank is forced to face a traumatic event that happened to him in high school. Meanwhile, Sid's boyfriend invites him to tour the wine country on bicycles, but Sid is mortified because he doesn't know how to ride a bike.
16	"The Cool Kids Un-Retire"	Kimberly McCullough	Heather Flanders	March 15, 2019	1LBA10	3.91
While Sid is house sitting a fellow resident's gorgeous high-rise apartment, the Cool Kids get a taste of the good life - and a taste of Charlie's incredible cookies. But when Margaret decides to turn Charlie's creative cookie-making into a new business venture, everyone gets a bit carried away.
17	"Margaret Ups Her Game"	Jonathan Judge	Paul Fruchbom	March 22, 2019	1LBA17	3.93
Margaret attempts to date the hottest guy in Shady Meadows, Gene (Patrick Duffy), but can't seem to rid herself of clingy Leonard (Stephen Tobolowsky). Meanwhile, Hank tries to sell his erotic vampire novel, with the help of Sid's cousin.
18	"Sid's Ex-Wife"	Phill Lewis	Justin Sayre	March 29, 2019	1LBA19	3.30
Sid's ex-wife Bonnie (Jennifer Coolidge) visits the home, and the gang discovers they have a great relationship. Sid soon reveals he and Bonnie have not actually divorced, as they fear it will ruin their good relationship. But when this revelation could also ruin his relationship with John. Meanwhile, Margaret and Charlie's plans to go to a concert take a detour, when they find out Hank has rented the van. And they discover Hank (who just got his driving privileges back after the events of "TV Heist") has become a stickler for the rules.
19	"Kip Samgood's Biggest Fan"	Jody Margolin Hahn	Jake Lasker & Morgan Lehmann	April 5, 2019	1LBA20	3.46
Sid's teen idol Kip Samgood (Jon Lovitz) is in town for an autograph signing, and Margaret accompanies Sid to confront Kip about stealing a song she wrote that became his signature song. Margaret finds that Kip not only admits it, but is into her as well — making Sid jealous. Meanwhile, Hank and Charlie struggle to write a song, as Charlie's six-month anniversary gift to Kathleen.
20	"Indecent Proposal"	Anthony Rich	Patrick Walsh	April 19, 2019	1LBA22	3.56
In an attempt to date a guy way out of her league, Margaret pretends to be someone she's not. When Hank doesn't hear back from his doctor about a questionable mole, he's convinced his days are numbered, so Charlie helps him get his test results. Meanwhile, Sid avoids John, who has a very important question to ask him.
21	"Vegas Baby!"	Rebecca Baughman	Alyson Fouse	May 3, 2019	1LBA21	3.15
Hank is excited to give his son, Tony (Tony Rock), the perfect wedding gift in Las Vegas, until he finds out Lorraine's boyfriend, Reggie, is paying for everything. Meanwhile, Margaret and Sid's luck at the blackjack table quickly takes a turn, and Charlie hopes his old Vegas connections will come through for him.
22	"The Friend-aversary"	Betsy Thomas	Conor Galvin	May 10, 2019	1LBA18	3.46
Hank, Charlie and Sid prepare their Friend-iversary party, and don't include Margaret. Noticing the tension between Hank and Sid, Margaret encourages Sid to speak up for himself. Meanwhile, Sid has his sights set on the patio for their party and attempts to convince the cat ladies to release it to them.

== Production ==
=== Development ===
On September 5, 2017, it was announced that Fox had given the production a pilot order. The pilot was written by Charlie Day and Paul Fruchbom with Kevin Abbott set to serve as showrunner if the pilot was ordered to series. Executive producers are set to include Day, Abbott, Rob McElhenney, Glenn Howerton, and Nick Frenkel with Fruchbom co-executive producing. Production companies involved with the pilot include 20th Century Fox Television and FXP. On November 16, 2017, it was announced that Don Scardino would direct the pilot.

On May 9, 2018, it was announced that Fox had given the production a series order. A few days later, it was announced that the series would premiere in the fall of 2018 and air on Fridays at 8:30 P.M. On June 12, 2018, it was reported that Patrick Walsh was replacing Abbott in the role of showrunner and was also joining the series as an executive producer. On June 28, 2018, it was announced that the series would premiere on September 28, 2018. On October 19, 2018, it was announced that Fox had ordered an additional nine episodes of the series, bringing the first season total up to twenty-two episodes. The series finale aired on May 10, 2019.

=== Casting ===
Alongside the announcement of the pilot's director, it was confirmed that Vicki Lawrence, David Alan Grier, Leslie Jordan, and Martin Mull had been cast in the pilot's lead roles. On November 9, 2018, it was announced that Lesley Ann Warren would make a guest appearance in an episode entitled "Charlie's Angel". The episode was notably set to serve as a reunion for Mull and Warren who had previously starred together in the 1985 film Clue.

=== Opening ===
For the opening of the show, a video of Michael and Carol Garland of Bedford, Texas is used.

=== Filming ===
The Cool Kids was filmed at 20th Century Studios in Century City, California, but it is set in Phoenix, Arizona.

== Release ==
=== Marketing ===
On May 14, 2018, Fox released the first trailer for the series.

=== Premiere ===
On September 13, 2018, the series took part in the 12th Annual PaleyFest Fall Television Previews which featured a preview screening of the series and a conversation with cast members including David Alan Grier, Martin Mull, Vicki Lawrence, and Leslie Jordan.

== Reception ==
=== Critical response ===
The series was met with a mixed to positive response from critics upon its premiere. On the review aggregation website Rotten Tomatoes, the series holds an approval rating of 65% with an average rating of 6.1 out of 10, based on 17 reviews. The website's critical consensus reads, "Though the cheesy jokes and cliches are old hat, an all-too-uncommon focus on older characters makes it easier to forgive The Cool Kids' lack of fresh wrinkles." Metacritic, which uses a weighted average, assigned the series a score of 42 out of 100 based on 9 critics, indicating "mixed or average reviews".

=== Ratings ===
Viewership and ratings per episode of The Cool Kids
No.	Title	Air date	Rating/share (18–49)	Viewers (millions)	DVR (18–49)	DVR viewers (millions)	Total (18–49)	Total viewers (millions)
1	"Pilot"	September 28, 2018	1.5/8	6.87	0.5	2.11	2.0	8.98
2	"Margaret Turns 65"	October 5, 2018	1.1/5	4.90	0.4	1.78	1.5	6.68
3	"A Date with Destiny"	October 12, 2018	1.0/5	4.77	0.4	1.73	1.4	6.50
4	"Sid Comes Out"	October 19, 2018	0.9/4	4.64	0.5	1.61	1.4	6.25
5	"The Cool Kids Rig an Election"	November 2, 2018	0.9/4	4.27	0.3	1.40	1.2	5.67
6	"TV Heist"	November 9, 2018	1.0/5	4.52	0.3	1.56	1.3	6.04
7	"Thanksgiving at Murray's"	November 16, 2018	0.9/4	4.38	0.4	1.45	1.3	5.83
8	"Hank the Cradle Robber"	December 7, 2018	0.9/4	4.35	—N/a	1.52	—N/a	5.87
9	"Margaret Dates the Zodiac Killer"	December 14, 2018	0.8/4	4.16	0.4	1.53	1.2	5.69
10	"Funeral Crashers"	January 4, 2019	0.8/4	4.28	0.4	1.56	1.1	5.84
11	"Charlie's Angel"	January 11, 2019	1.0/5	4.78	—N/a	1.51	—N/a	6.25
12	"Margaret Jr."	February 1, 2019	0.9/4	4.65	0.3	1.38	1.2	6.03
13	"Sid's First Relationship"	February 22, 2019	0.7/3	3.80	0.4	1.48	1.1	5.28
14	"The Cool Kids Plus One"	March 1, 2019	0.7/3	4.08	0.4	1.34	1.1	5.42
15	"Mentors"	March 8, 2019	0.7/4	3.85	0.4	1.48	1.1	5.35
16	"The Cool Kids Un-Retire"	March 15, 2019	0.7/4	3.91	—N/a	1.43	—N/a	5.33
17	"Margaret Ups Her Game"	March 22, 2019	0.7/4	3.93	0.3	1.37	1.0	5.30
18	"Sid's Ex-Wife"	March 29, 2019	0.6/3	3.30	0.3	1.16	0.9	4.46
19	"Kip Samgood's Biggest Fan"	April 5, 2019	0.7/4	3.46	0.2	1.20	0.9	4.66
20	"Indecent Proposal"	April 19, 2019	0.6/4	3.56	0.3	1.27	0.9	4.82
21	"Vegas Baby!"	May 3, 2019	0.6/3	3.15	TBD	TBD	TBD	TBD
22	"The Friend-aversary"	May 10, 2019	0.6/4	3.46	TBD	TBD	TBD	TBD
