= Abbott Elementary and It's Always Sunny in Philadelphia crossover =

2025 television crossover event

- Crossover event
- Promotional poster for Abbott Elementary episode

Part 1: Abbott Elementary
- Episode title: "Volunteers"
- Episode no.: Season 4 Episode 9
- Directed by: Randall Einhorn
- Written by: Garrett Werner
- Production code: T12.19409
- Original air date: January 8, 2025

Episode chronology
← Previous "Winter Break"	Next → "Testing"
- Abbott Elementary season 4

Part 2: It's Always Sunny in Philadelphia
- Episode title: "The Gang F***s Up Abbott Elementary"
- Episode no.: Season 17; Episode 1
- Directed by: Todd Biermann
- Written by: Charlie Day; Rob McElhenney; Keyonna Taylor
- Production code: XIP17005
- Original air date: July 9, 2025

Episode chronology
← Previous "Dennis Takes a Mental Health Day"	Next → "Frank Is in a Coma"
- It's Always Sunny in Philadelphia season 17

The Abbott Elementary and It's Always Sunny in Philadelphia crossover is a two-part fictional crossover event between the ABC workplace comedy Abbott Elementary and the FXX black comedy It's Always Sunny in Philadelphia that was produced for broadcast in 2025. In the event, "the Gang", a group of narcissistic and sociopathic proprietors of a bar, are given a court order to volunteer in an underprivileged elementary school in Philadelphia. Both episodes tell the same story, but through the viewpoints of their own characters. The crossover began on Abbott Elementary with the ninth episode of the fourth season, "Volunteers". It aired on January 8, 2025. The second part, "The Gang F***s Up Abbott Elementary", aired on July 9, 2025, as the first episode in the seventeenth season of It's Always Sunny in Philadelphia.

The crossover was first conceived after Quinta Brunson and Rob McElhenney, the respective creators of Abbott Elementary and It's Always Sunny in Philadelphia, met at the 75th Primetime Emmy Awards and joked that their shows should crossover. Conversations continued later in the year before being pitched to the Walt Disney Company CEO Bob Iger, where it became a reality. The production team of both series faced further challenges acquiring legal approvals and issues with scheduling. "Volunteers" was written by Garrett Werner and directed by Randall Einhorn, while the second part was written by Charlie Day, Mac, and Keyonna Taylor and directed by Todd Biermann.

The popularity of both series led to it being considered a highly anticipated crossover. In their respective channels, the first part was viewed by 3.76 million viewers, and the second part was viewed by 3.55 million viewers; both received mostly positive reviews from critics.

== Plot ==
=== Part 1: "Volunteers" ===
After returning from winter break, Ava announces that a district initiative will bring new teacher aides into Abbott's classrooms. The teachers are initially overjoyed to hear the news. When the jumbotron falls off the gym wall, Ava attempts to obtain a new one from the golf course lawyer, who has been bribing the school to prevent being reported for using non-union employees. Charlie, Dennis, Mac, Dee, and Frank arrive at Abbott to volunteer. Dennis becomes immediately suspicious due to the presence of the cameras and disappears. Charlie helps Jacob fix his classroom air ducts, and Frank assists Gregory and Mr. Johnson in protecting the community garden from a raccoon. Janine and Dee bond over their shared alma mater, the University of Pennsylvania. Ava makes Mac her vice principal for the week. Over time, the teachers come to a consensus that the volunteers are exhibiting strange behavior.

When another teacher mentions that one of the volunteers invited her to a bar, Melissa recognizes them as a group of criminals and the owners of Paddy's Pub. The gang explains that they're being forced to volunteer as part of a court order for misdemeanor pollution charges as a consequence from the episode Thought Leadership: A Corporate Conversation. The teachers debate if they should kick the volunteers out, but decide to let them stay. Jacob pawns Charlie off on Melissa and Dee is overly flirtatious with Gregory. Jacob and Melissa suspect that Charlie can't read so Barbara decides to teach him. Dee finds out that Gregory and Janine are in a relationship but tries to hook up with him anyway. Mr. Johnson discovers that Frank was eating the garden's compost, allowing the raccoons to return. Mac acquires a photo of a protected bird on the golf course construction site, which Ava uses to blackmail them, ultimately receiving a new scoreboard. Gregory rejects Dee, and Charlie receives a certificate for learning to read. Initially pleased with Mac's work and hoping to continue exploiting "the Gang" for free labor, Ava then signs off on the release for the volunteers after Mac disappoints her, stating that they have fulfilled their required volunteer hours.

=== Part 2: "The Gang F***s Up Abbott Elementary" ===
The episode starts with Ava reminding viewers that volunteers came to Abbott Elementary a few months ago. She says that they were alerted to some additional footage that showed what the gang got up to whilst they were at the school. Ava replays the clip of the gang meeting the Abbott staff where Dennis hides behind the cameras to avoid being filmed. The gang then locks themselves in the teachers lounge after Frank asks for a private meeting as he has an idea which he calls a "goldmine". Ava pauses the video and says "I can't believe that these shitheads forgot they were Mic'd."

Frank's idea was to take the copper pipes out of the walls so he can sell the copper for profit and when Dennis tells him not to do that, Frank tells him that the state was going to make them do it anyway so they would be doing the school a favor. Dennis however says he wants to get out of here as soon as possible before he notices how bad the coffee is. Mac also expresses wanting to get out of there due to not wanting lice but Dee says black people can't get lice leading to an argument on whether that statement is racist until Janitor Mr. Johnson kicks the gang out of the teacher's lounge due to them not being teachers.

Janine tells the cameras that she liked Dee at first, but once she saw the new footage she finally realizes Dee's true nature, shocking Gregory with the use of expletives. The footage then cuts back to when Dee and Janine realize they went to the same college and are complimenting each other over it. Dee then steps outside and tells the camera crew to make her the star whatever they are filming. Janine and Gregory refer to Dee as crazy for suggesting that and Janine expressed relief that Dee wasn't attracted to Gregory at all.

Ava then says that the gang couldn't pretend to volunteer for long as soon they started trying to recruit kids to be part of a basketball team whilst Dennis uses the school science room and equipment to fix the coffee issue.

The gang invites the teachers to free drinks at Paddy's Pub at the end of the week to say thanks for tolerating their antics, and Dennis presents them a new coffee machine as a parting gift. Frank's absence is noted by everyone, and it is revealed that he was at the school, removing the copper from the bathroom walls. Ava tells the camera that the government was going to make them remove it anyway, this fulfilling Frank's prophecy that he would be doing the school a favor.

== Production ==
=== Development ===
Quinta Brunson

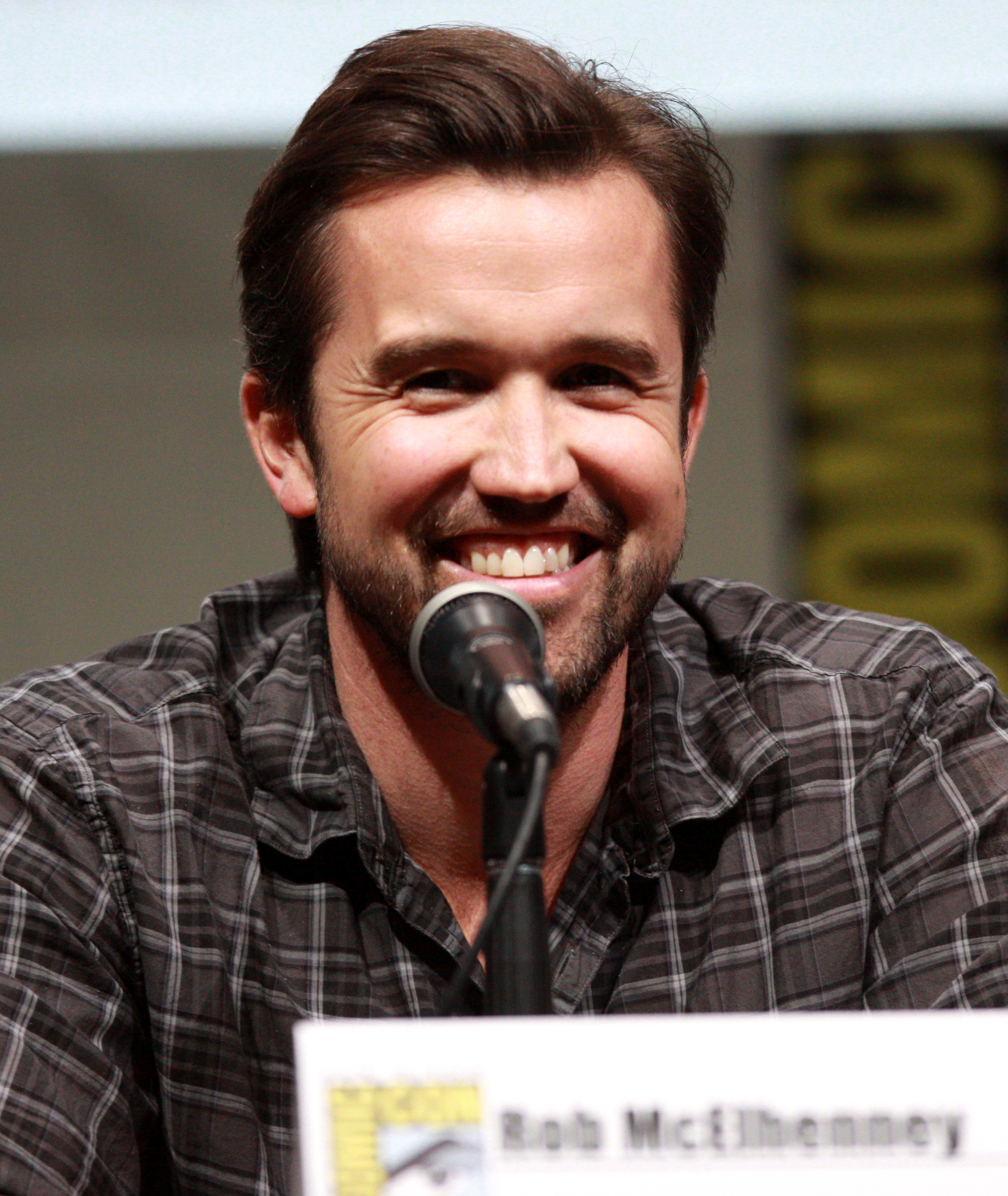
Rob McElhenney

Brunson and McElhenney, creators of Abbott Elementary and It's Always Sunny in Philadelphia, respectively, conceived an idea for the crossover after meeting at the 75th Primetime Emmy Awards.

In January 2024, Quinta Brunson, creator of the American Broadcasting Company (ABC) workplace comedy Abbott Elementary, and Rob McElhenney, creator of the FXX black comedy It's Always Sunny in Philadelphia, met at the 75th Primetime Emmy Awards. The two, both Philadelphia natives, stated to each other that they were fans of each others' series, which are both set in Philadelphia, and joked that they should make a crossover episode. In response to social media posts comparing Willy's Chocolate Experience to Always Sunny, McElhenney stated he felt the event instead seemed akin to an Abbott and Always Sunny crossover, and Brunson reposted McElhenney's tweet. Conversations continued during ABC's 2024 upfronts when the two formed a premise. The idea was then pitched to Bob Iger, CEO of the Walt Disney Company, who was "very into it." Legal approvals also had to be obtained before it became a reality, including one from Warner Bros. Television which co-produces Abbott.

Brunson teased in July at the 2024 San Diego Comic-Con that the then-upcoming fourth season of Abbott would have a crossover with another series. She stated that she was inspired to pursue a crossover after remembering the excitement she had watching "That's So Suite Life of Hannah Montana" when she was younger. Brunson confirmed no further details at the time, but it was suspected that it would be with a program owned by Disney such as The Bear, The Simpsons, Grey's Anatomy, or It's Always Sunny in Philadelphia. In October, it was officially announced that it would be with the seventeenth season of Always Sunny. Although the two programs air on different networks, both of them are owned by Disney and are set in Philadelphia, Pennsylvania. Later that month, it was also revealed that the crossover would actually be two parts, with the first part taking place on Abbott and the second part on Always Sunny.

=== Casting ===
The producers of Abbott were initially uncertain which Always Sunny stars would be available for the crossover beyond McElhenney and Day. The availability of Kaitlin Olson was unknown due to her role on the ABC crime drama High Potential and an opening in Glenn Howerton's schedule was in doubt as he was filming the black comedy Sirens for Netflix. The production staff was told by McElhenney that Danny DeVito would appear, but they encountered difficulties formally securing his participation. All five starring cast members ultimately appeared in the Abbott episode, though Howerton was only able to make a brief appearance. The five portray Ronald "Mac" McDonald, Charlie Kelly, Frank Reynolds, Dee Reynolds, and Dennis Reynolds.

=== Writing ===
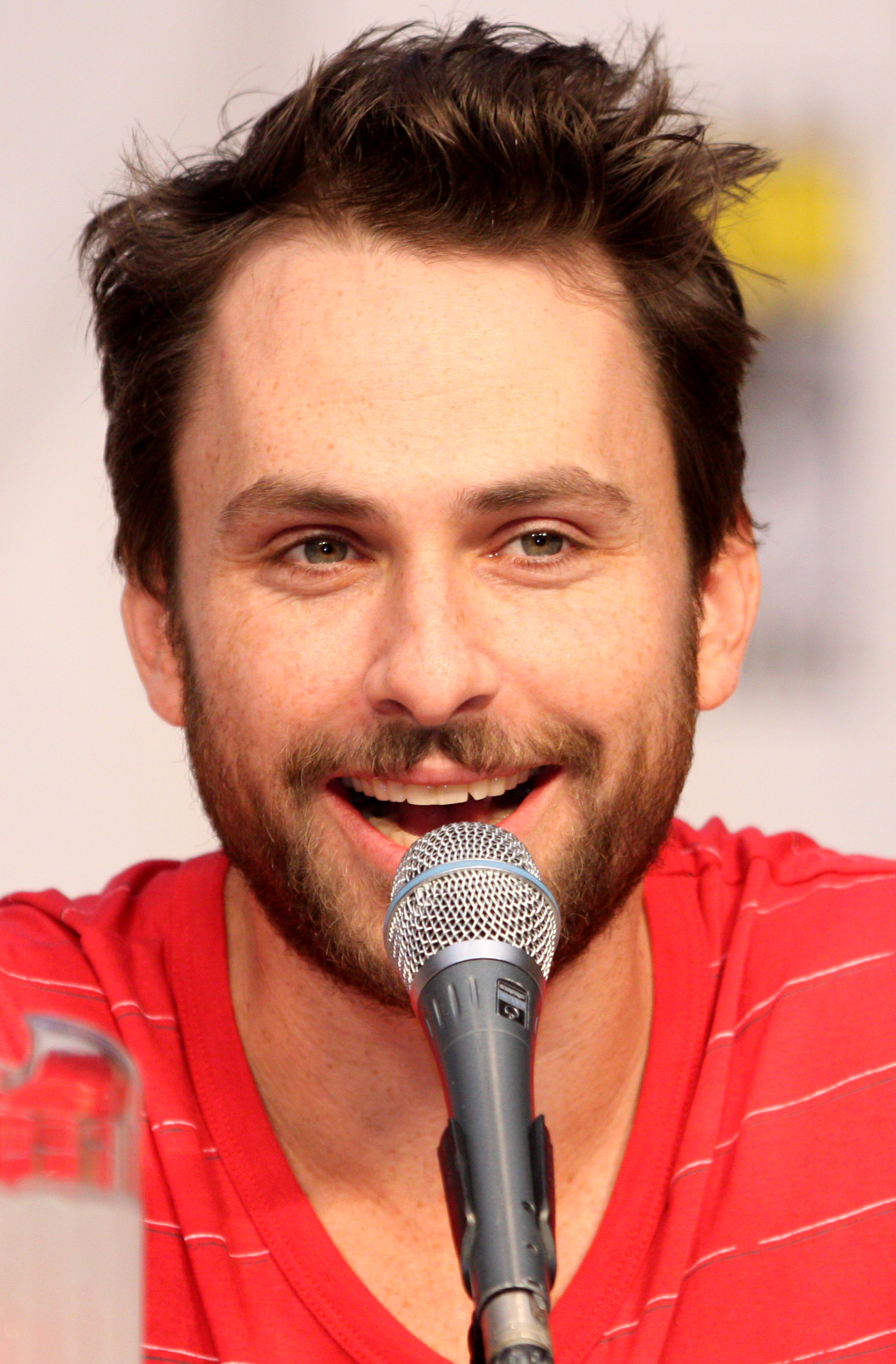
One storyline in the crossover centered around Charlie Day's character being taught to read. This plot thread was inspired by Billy Madison.

Initially, it was a concern that the tone of each series would conflict with each other. Abbott is a family-oriented show, while Always Sunny is a black comedy for adults. Rob McElhenney and Always Sunny co-creator Charlie Day participated in the Abbott writers' room for a day so that the storyline could be developed. Originally, Day was uncertain about the prospects of such a crossover as he felt attached to the characters and was anxious about how they'd be written by others. He later said these concerns subsided after meeting with Brunson. Day also had to join virtually via Zoom as he had COVID-19 at the time. Abbott's script supervisor, Jeff Gonzalez, previously worked on Always Sunny for 11 years. The Abbott writers' room was then split in half, with the other half assigned to work on the following episode. All of the writers in the Abbott writers' room who contributed to the episode had to close deals to receive consulting credits on Always Sunny. Writing for the seventeenth season of Always Sunny took place in late-2024. Beat sheets and outlines were emailed between the two series until the scripts were complete.

To properly tell the events of the crossover, it was decided that both episodes would tell the same narrative but from different perspectives. McElhenney explained that this aspect particularly succeeded with the darker tone of Always Sunny's characters, because the mockumentary format of Abbott allowed them to act differently than they traditionally would without sacrificing the authenticity, because they knew they were being recorded. He further elaborated that the same reasoning worked in reverse for the Abbott characters, because they aren't being filmed during the Always Sunny episode, which allows a new side to be shown. Despite this, both episodes tell stand-alone stories.

The first part was originally set to be penned by Joya McCrory but was ultimately written by Garrett Werner as it was decided that he better knew the characters of Always Sunny. Werner stated that he watched a number of other well-known crossovers before writing his episode. Howerton's role as Dennis is significantly reduced in the Abbott episode as he was only available for half a day and Werner ultimately wasn't aware of Howerton's involvement until last-minute. A version of the script also existed without Howerton altogether. The storyline involving Charlie being moved to lower grades and being taught to read was partially inspired by the 1995 film Billy Madison.

The Abbott production team also requested a longer runtime for this episode, but was only granted an additional 15-seconds by ABC. Werner submitted his episode on September 18, 2024, which was slightly edited by the Always Sunny team to allow for references to pass between the two shows. One plot thread cut from the Abbott episode because of the time constraints included a shared backstory for Frank and Mr. Johnson in which it would be explained that they had attended the same high school and already knew each other because they had both dated the same person. This woman was later revealed to be Shadynasty, who had actually dated Frank and his brother, and first appeared in "Frank's Brother", a 2011 episode of Always Sunny's seventh season.

The Always Sunny episode was co-written by Day, McElhenney, and Keyonna Taylor. Day described the second part as "a complete rated-R version of their show, not just for our characters, but for their characters as well. We were really able to do things with them that they can't do on ABC." This episode was written to fill in any gaps left in the Abbott episode by showing things that happened in between their scenes.

=== Filming ===
Scheduling conflicts caused difficulties in filming the crossover as Abbott's fourth season had already begun filming while Always Sunny was still in pre-production. Scott Sites, a line producer on Abbott, was tasked with overseeing the schedule to ensure the crossover came to fruition. Filming for the Abbott episode began on September 30, 2024, and lasted for six days, a day longer than typical for the series. This episode was directed by Randall Einhorn, who had also previously directed episodes of Always Sunny. Recording took place on soundstages at Warner Bros. studio lot in Burbank. The Warner Bros. team was also concerned with filming an episode set in the winter in September.

Some "NSFW" improvisational scenes had to be cut from this episode. One of these included McElhenney's character saying "That Johnny Knoxville guy destroyed his penis. There's nothing there." Another take had Mac saying that he was "currently gay" when Ava believed she was being offered sexual favors. A separate scene featured Mr. Johnson accusing Frank of having "donkey brains", this was also cut for time constraints, and Frank responding that he owned a document confirming that he didn't. The scene in Abbott where the scoreboard fell off the wall was considered to be the "most elaborate special effect" ever done in the series and was filmed in a single take.

The second part was the first episode in the seventeenth season of Always Sunny to be filmed; filming for the season wrapped in December 2024. It was directed by Todd Biermann and was also filmed on the set of Abbott.

== Release and reception ==
=== Broadcast and streaming ===
The Abbott Elementary episode of the crossover aired on ABC on January 8, 2025, at 8:30 p.m. Eastern Time. The Always Sunny portion originally slated a premiere date for June 2025 as the season premiere of Always Sunny's seventeenth season. This was later pushed back to July 9, 2025, airing on FXX at 9:00 p.m. ET, in a one-hour timeslot with the following episode. The two Always Sunny episodes were also simulcast on FX. Both parts of the crossover became available for streaming on Hulu the day after their respective broadcast.

=== Viewership ===
The first part of the crossover was watched by 3.76 million Americans and received a 0.68 rating among adults aged 18–49. After factoring in seven-day DVR and streaming viewership, the overall total rose to 4.57 million viewers, with an 18–49 rating of 0.83. On FXX, the second part was viewed by 151,000 and had a 0.09 18–49 rating; that same night, the FX simulcast brought in 204,000 views and a rating of 0.07.

=== Critical response ===
Prior to it airing, many entertainment outlets considered the crossover to be a highly anticipated event.

Reviewing the first episode, Noel Murray of The New York Times remarked on the shows' differences and asked, "Can this combination work? The answer is a qualified 'yes'," crediting the actors for allowing the shows to mesh well. Vulture's Ile-Ife Okantah gave the episode 5 out of 5 stars, remarking that it "injects a healthy dose of adult humor into Abbott Elementary ... as each insufferable member of the gang highlights the optimism and resourcefulness of the Abbott staff". The A.V. Club's Saloni Gajjar called it "one of the best examples of a TV crossover". She also commented on the shows' different approaches, noting that the crossover did not "undercut the ABC sitcom's wholesomeness or It's Always Sunny's pure chaos, instead reveling in the odd mashup". Writing for Consequence, Liz Shannon Miller found it "works pretty well", pointing out the large cast size meant "there's a lot going on, and all of it happens pretty fast". She added, "Abbott brings out some latent sweetness from the Sunny gang ... [and] we discover that Abbott, as much as it's beloved for its good heart and charming characters, isn't as pure-of-heart as one might assume."
