= Kill Me (2026 film) =

- Directed by: Peter Warren
- Written by: Peter Warren
- Produced by: Nate Bolotin; Keith Goldberg; Natalie Metzger; Maxime Cottray; Mike Richardson; Charlie Day; Peter Warren
- Starring: Charlie Day; Allison Williams; Giancarlo Esposito; Aya Cash; Jessica Harper; David Krumholtz; Tony Cavalero
- Cinematography: Conor Murphy
- Edited by: Brett W. Bachman; Todd Zelin
- Music by: Bill Sherman; Zach Marsh
- Production companies: XYZ Films; Vanishing Angle; Dark Horse Entertainment; Daylight Productions
- Distributed by: Samuel Goldwyn Films
- Release dates: March 12, 2026 (SXSW); 2027 (United States)
- Running time: 105 minutes
- Country: United States
- Language: English

Kill Me is a 2026 American comedy mystery thriller film written, produced, and directed by Peter Warren. It stars Charlie Day, Allison Williams, Giancarlo Esposito, Aya Cash, Jessica Harper, David Krumholtz, and Tony Cavalero.

The film premiered at the SXSW on March 12, 2026.

== Cast ==
- Charlie Day as Jimmy
- Allison Williams as Margot
- Giancarlo Esposito as Dr. Singer
- Aya Cash as Alice
- Jessica Harper
- David Krumholtz as Lou
- Tony Cavalero

== Production ==
In November 2023, it was reported that Peter Warren would be writing and directing a new film starring Charlie Day in the lead role. Principal photography wrapped in March 2025, in Utah, with Allison Williams, Giancarlo Esposito, Aya Cash, Jessica Harper, David Krumholtz, and Tony Cavalero rounding out the cast.

== Release ==
Kill Me premiered at the SXSW on March 12, 2026. In November, Samuel Goldwyn Films announced they had acquired US distribution rights and plans to release in 2027.
