= Frank Is in a Coma =

- It's Always Sunny in Philadelphia episode
- Episode no.: Season 17; Episode 2
- Directed by: Imani Hakim
- Written by: Dave Chernin; John Chernin
- Cinematography by: John Tanzer
- Editing by: Steve Welch
- Production code: XIP17007
- Original air date: July 9, 2025
- Running time: 23 minutes

Guest appearances
- Alex Wolff as Simon; Audrey Wasilewski as Nurse

Episode chronology
← Previous "The Gang F***s Up Abbott Elementary"	Next → "Mac and Dennis Become EMTs"
- It's Always Sunny in Philadelphia season 17

"Frank Is in a Coma" is the second episode of the seventeenth season of the American sitcom television series It's Always Sunny in Philadelphia. It is the 172nd overall episode of the series and was written by executive producers Dave Chernin and John Chernin, and directed by Imani Hakim. It originally aired on FX and FXX on July 9, 2025.

The episode received mostly positive reviews from critics, who praised the humor, tone and twist ending.

== Plot ==
Dee finds that Frank threw an invitation in the trash, where they were invited to the Ben Franklin Liberty Ball. While the gang is excited over the gala, Frank does not want to go. He gets into an argument with Dee over what constitutes a "real cake", who responds by tickling him. However, Frank ends up falling in a coma.

Frank's body is taken to Charlie's apartment, where a nurse reveals that Frank specified that Dee should turn off his life support if his condition worsens. Charlie, Mac and Dennis leave to buy beers, when they actually leave to attend the gala by themselves. They hope to introduce themselves as self-made entrepreneurs to fit in with the rest of the guests, but they are mistaken for waiters. As they discuss their next strategy in the restroom, they are approached by a man named Simon, owner of a company. He's gleeful of his father's death as he inherited the company and after getting them to snort cocaine, invites them to join him at a party.

Dee is forced to stay with Frank and his nurse after realizing that the boys abandoned her. She decides to check the apartment to find any of Frank's prized possessions, but she only finds a pornographic magazine as his biggest possession. Upset, she leaves for her apartment. As she reads the magazine, she finds a paper. The paper is a childhood drawing that Dee made for Frank, moving her. Charlie, Mac and Dennis accompany Simon to another party after successfully convincing him to invest in Paddy's Pub. However, they decide to leave after he loses consciousness in a crackhouse. They return to the apartment, where Dee has decided to pull his life support. However, they soon discover that Frank's body is actually cake, and Frank emerges from the adjacent room. He reveals that he pulled a prank on them to prove that they were not able to differentiate a real cake from a fake one, also revealing that he drew the paper that Dee found. As Charlie, Mac and Dennis ask Frank over a possible investor for the bar, Frank dismisses it.

== Production ==
=== Development ===
In June 2025, FXX reported that the second episode of the seventeenth season would be titled "Frank Is in a Coma", and was to be written by executive producers Dave Chernin and John Chernin, and directed by Imani Hakim. This was Dave's 11th writing credit, John's 10th writing credit, and Hakim's first directing credit.

== Reception ==
=== Viewers ===
In its original American broadcast, "Frank Is in a Coma" was seen by an estimated 0.274 million household viewers and gained a 0.10 ratings share among adults aged 18–49, according to Nielsen Media Research. This means that 0.10 percent of all households with televisions watched the episode. This was a slight decrease in viewership from the previous episode, which was watched by 0.355 million viewers with a 0.16 in the 18–49 demographics.

=== Critical reviews ===
"Frank Is in a Coma" received mostly positive reviews from critics. Brian Tallerico of The A.V. Club wrote, "This installment works from a classic Sunny template in which the gang cuts Dee out of a possible endeavor only to f*ck it up themselves. It also works from the comic vein in which the gang blames someone else for their failures, usually Frank, who gets trashed this episode for not elevating them like they intended when they allowed him into their idiot club so many years ago."

Ross Bonaime of Collider wrote, "One of the season's best episodes, 'Frank Is in a Coma', is a brilliant take on a show that doesn't reveal itself until the very end. But the episode also feels more in line with the earlier days of It's Always Sunny, where the series could go into some truly bleak, dark places, before pulling back the curtain and ending on a massive laugh." Jerrica Tisdale of Telltale TV gave the episode a 3.6 star rating out of 5 and wrote, "Overall, 'Frank is in a Coma' is an all right episode. It has plenty of funny moments, a standout guest character, and draws upon one of the show's best episodes. It just isn't one we will remember as much as others."

Danielle Ryan of /Film wrote, "Eventually, Frank reveals that his coma was all a bit and the gang enjoys a pretty f***ed-up laugh over the cake, but he might have finally taken things a step too far for Dee. Then again, if convincing Olson's character she was a successful stand-up comedian and was going to do a set on Conan's late night show only to reveal that it was a fake-out didn't fully send her over the edge, maybe nothing will." Sam Huang of TV Fanatic gave the episode a 3.4 star rating out of 5 and wrote, "I actually quite enjoyed this episode. Even though I was initially skeptical of the season after the premiere, this episode reinstated my faith in Season 17."
