= Charlie Day =

American actor, comedian and producer (born 1976)

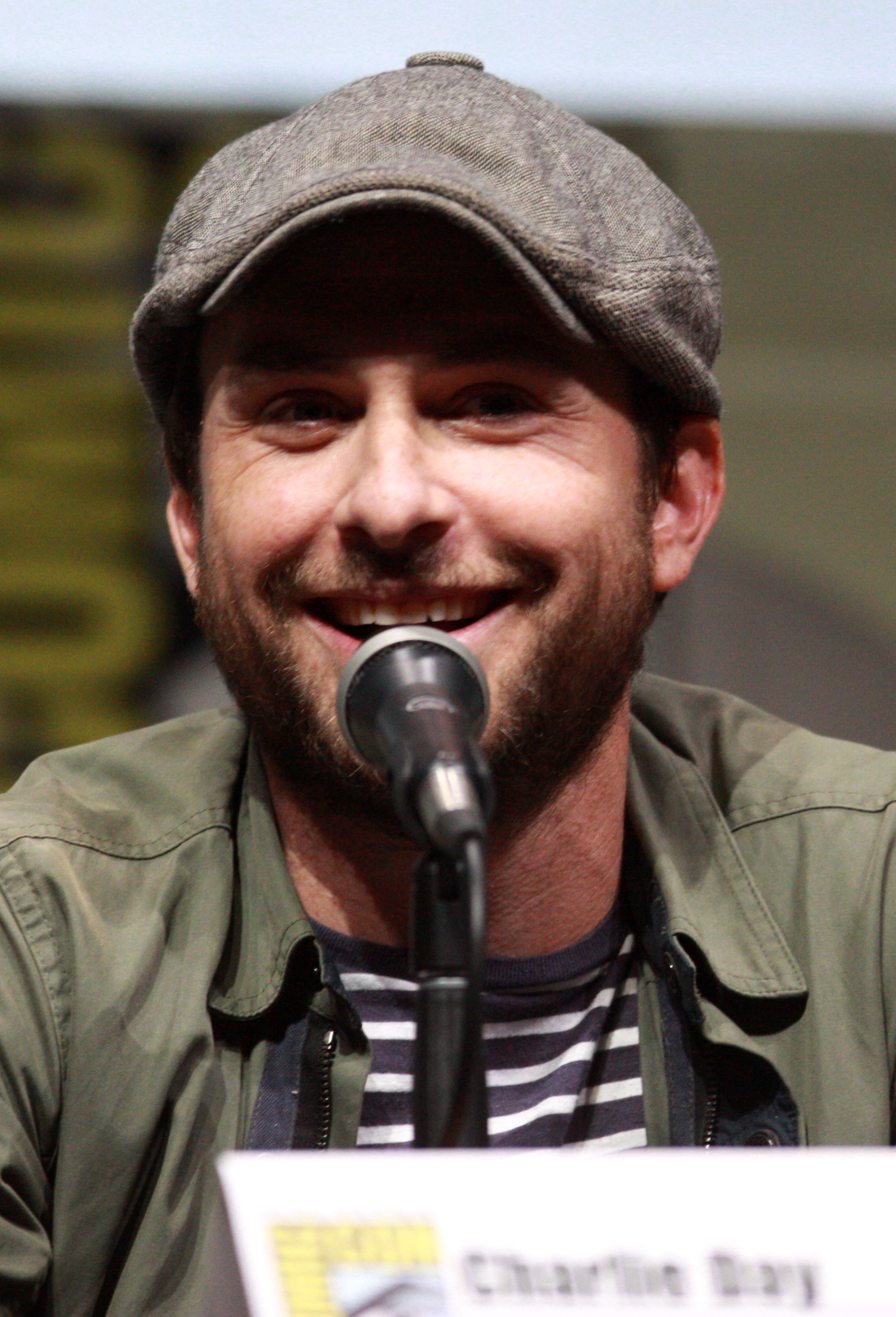
- Day at the 2013 San Diego Comic Con
- Born: Charles Peckham Day; February 9, 1976 (age 50); New York City, U.S.
- Education: Merrimack College (BA)
- Occupations: Actor; comedian; writer; producer
- Years active: 1997–present
- Spouse: Mary Elizabeth Ellis (m. 2006)
- Children: 1

Charles Peckham Day (born February 9, 1976) is an American actor, comedian, writer, and producer. He is best known for playing Charlie Kelly on the FX/FXX dark comedy series It's Always Sunny in Philadelphia (2005–present), of which he is also a writer and an executive producer. In 2011, he was nominated for a Critics' Choice Television Award and a Satellite Award for the role. Subsequently, he co-created the Apple TV+ comedy Mythic Quest (2020–2025) with Rob McElhenney and Megan Ganz.

In film, Day is best known for his performances as Dr. Newton Geiszler in Guillermo del Toro's Pacific Rim (2013), Dale Arbus in the comedy Horrible Bosses (2011) and its sequel Horrible Bosses 2 (2014), and Andy Campbell in the comedy Fist Fight (2017). He is also known for his voice roles in Monsters University (2013), The Lego Movie film franchise (2014–2019), and Nintendo franchise character Luigi in The Super Mario Bros. Movie (2023) and its sequel, The Super Mario Galaxy Movie (2026). He made his directorial debut with Fool's Paradise (2023).

== Early life ==
Day was born on February 9, 1976, in New York City. His family lived in the Riverdale neighborhood of the Bronx. He spent most of his childhood in Middletown, Rhode Island. He is the younger of two children, with an elder sister named Alice. His father, Dr. Thomas Charles Day, who is of Italian and Irish descent, is a retired professor of music history at Salve Regina University in Newport, Rhode Island. His mother, Mary (née Peckham), is of English descent and was a music teacher at The Pennfield School (formerly The New School) in Portsmouth, Rhode Island. His paternal grandfather changed the family name from Del Giorno to Day to assimilate during WWII; he died in a military training accident when his son Thomas was only four.

Day attended Pennfield School and graduated from the Portsmouth Abbey School, both in Portsmouth, Rhode Island. He attended Merrimack College, where he majored in art history and was active in the Onstagers, Merrimack's student theater organization. He graduated in 1998. In May 2014, he gave the commencement speech for Merrimack's graduating class and received an honorary Ph.D.

== Career ==
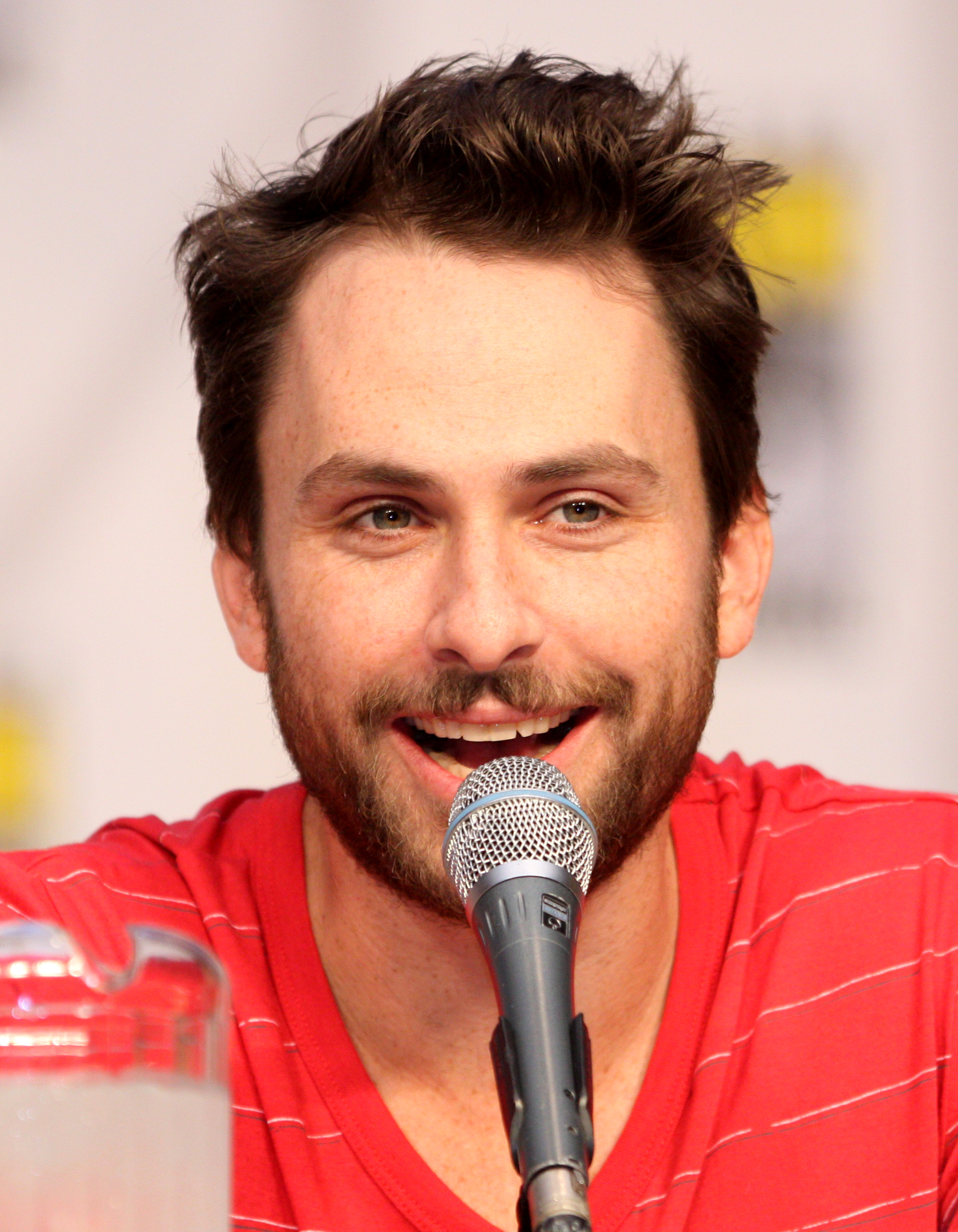
Day at the 2010 San Diego Comic-Con

While still in college, Day was active in the training programs at the Williamstown Theatre Festival every summer from 1997, where he was a contemporary of actors such as Jimmi Simpson, David Hornsby, Kathryn Hahn, Justin Long, and Sterling K. Brown. Day went on to play the lead role in the stage play Dead End at the Huntington Theatre in Boston.

After graduating, Day worked on small television roles, advertisements, and voiceovers for the Independent Film Channel (IFC), and supplemented his income by waiting tables and answering phones for a telethon. In the early 2000s, he had guest and recurring appearances on television shows such as Law & Order, Third Watch, Reno 911!, and the short-lived sitcom, Luis.

=== It's Always Sunny in Philadelphia and related projects ===
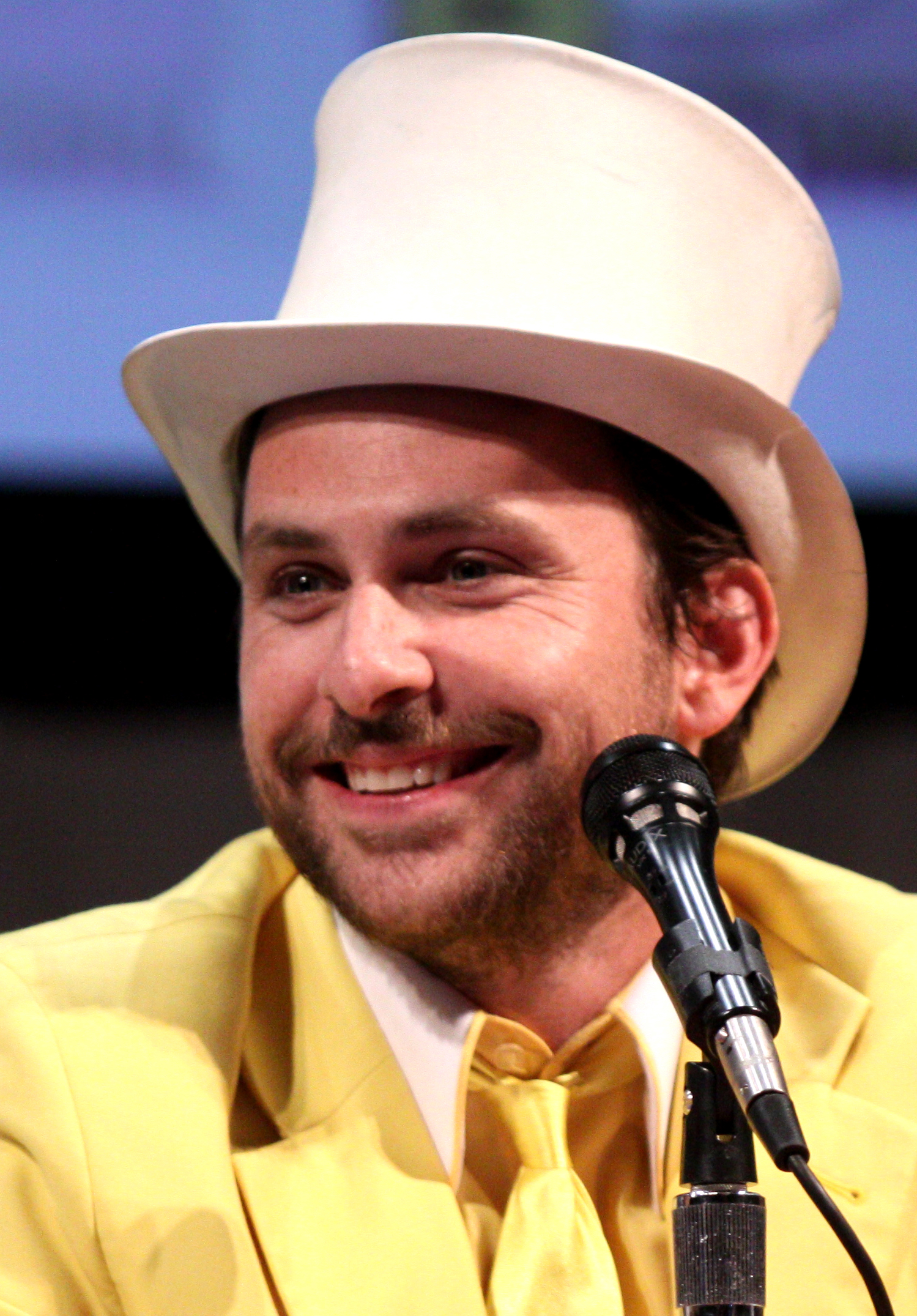
Day at the 2011 San Diego Comic Con

In the early years of his career, Day made comedy sketches and absurd short films in his spare time alongside Jimmi Simpson, with whom he was living in New York City, and several friends, including David Hornsby, Nate Mooney, Logan Marshall-Green, and other actors—many of whom they had met through the Williamstown Theatre Festival. These home videos served as the inspiration for several scripted short films he later developed with Rob McElhenney and Glenn Howerton in 2003, once he had moved to Los Angeles. Among these home movies were two scenes about three self-involved, struggling actors in Los Angeles getting into awkward and darkly comedic situations between auditions and jobs, which went on to form the basis of the pilot episode of the comedy series It's Always Sunny in Philadelphia.

In 2005, the first season of It's Always Sunny in Philadelphia was released on FX television. In addition to executive producing and writing for the show, Day stars as Charlie Kelly. In 2021, It's Always Sunny became the longest running live-action comedy on American television with the release of its 15th season. The series is still ongoing, with its 18th season in the works as of April 2026.

Since November 2021, Day, McElhenney and Howerton have been releasing The Always Sunny Podcast. They set out to rewatch the entire series and share behind-the-scenes information, but the podcast's focus shifted to the banter and dynamic between the three creators.

Day has developed and produced several television shows in addition to It's Always Sunny in Philadelphia. In 2011 and 2012, he produced the short-lived comedies How to Be a Gentleman (2011–2012) and Unsupervised (2012), which were created by It's Always Sunny writers David Hornsby, Scott Marder, and Rob Rosell. In 2017, he co-created the Fox sitcom The Cool Kids (2018–2019), starring Vicki Lawrence, Martin Mull, David Alan Grier, and Leslie Jordan, which was set in a retirement community. He served as an executive producer through its first season after which the show was canceled.

On August 9, 2019, Mythic Quest, a half-hour comedy series co-created by Day, McElhenney, and Megan Ganz, who is also an executive producer on It's Always Sunny, was announced as one of the original productions for the then-upcoming streaming service, Apple TV+. In addition to being co-creator, Day was an executive producer on Mythic Quest, which aired for four seasons from 2020 to 2025.

=== Films and other work ===
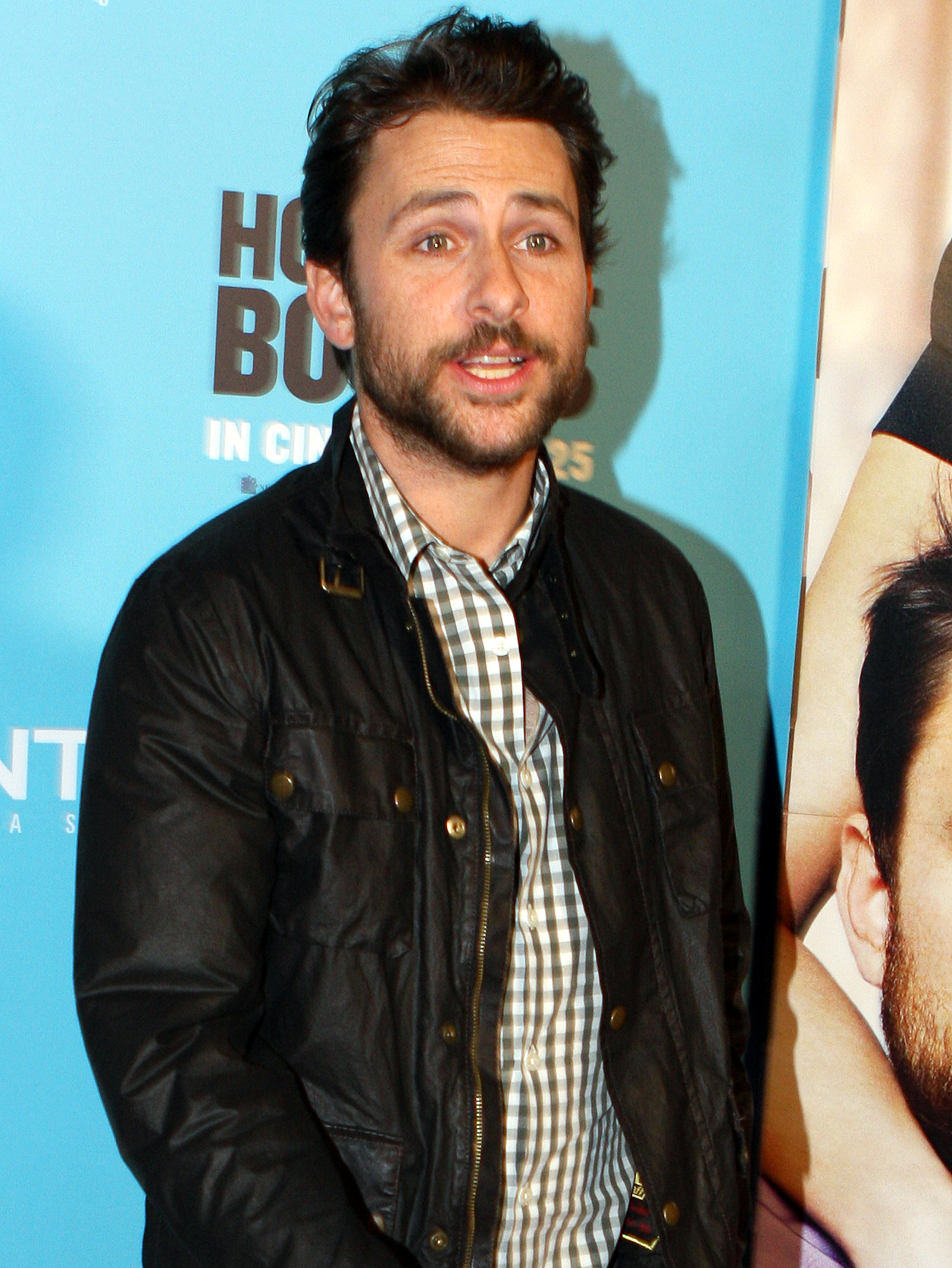
Day at the premiere for Horrible Bosses in August 2011

In July 2011, Day starred in New Line Cinema's Horrible Bosses with Jason Bateman, Jason Sudeikis, Kevin Spacey, Jennifer Aniston, Colin Farrell, and Jamie Foxx. The film was a commercial success, and Day's performance as Dale Arbus was praised by critics. He later reprised the role in the sequel Horrible Bosses 2 released in November 2014. Day had previously worked with Sudeikis in the 2010 film Going the Distance, starring Justin Long and Drew Barrymore.

Day hosted the November 5, 2011, episode of Saturday Night Live (SNL) with Maroon 5 as the musical guest. He was the second cast member from It's Always Sunny in Philadelphia to host SNL (after Danny DeVito, though DeVito hosted SNL before Sunny premiered, the last time being in 1999; notably, however, DeVito would make a brief cameo during Day's opening monologue). Day would also make another brief cameo in the following season's episode hosted by Jamie Foxx on December 8, 2012, as a congressman in the episode's sketch "Maine Justice". In September 2014, Day provided his voice for The Sims 4 TV spots.

Day had a significant role in the Guillermo del Toro science fiction kaiju film Pacific Rim (2013), in which he played biologist Dr. Newton "Newt" Geiszler, who is the focus of the secondary comedic plot with Burn Gorman and Ron Perlman. He was cast based on his performance in the It's Always Sunny episode Charlie Kelly: King of the Rats, as del Toro was a fan of the show. In exchange, Day created the recurring role of Pappy McPoyle for del Toro on It's Always Sunny. In 2018, he reprised the role of Newt for the sequel Pacific Rim Uprising directed by Steven S. DeKnight.

In 2015, Day and Ice Cube were cast as the leads in Fist Fight (2017), a story about two teachers brawling conceived by Max Greenfield. Day plays Andy Campbell, a high school English teacher, who is challenged by his co-worker, history teacher Ronald Strickland (Ice Cube), to a fight after getting him fired. The film was directed by Richie Keen, who had directed episodes of It's Always Sunny, and released in February 2017.

Later that year, Day played Ralph, a vulgar comedian and close friend of the protagonist, in I Love You, Daddy, which was directed by Louis C.K. and featured himself, Chloe Grace Moretz, John Malkovich, Rose Byrne, Pamela Adlon, Edie Falco, and Helen Hunt. Day was the first to be cast, as C.K. was a fan of It's Always Sunny. The film premiered at TIFF 2017 and was scheduled to have its public opening in November 2017, but was dropped by all its distributors after the allegations of C.K.'s sexual misconduct were made public by The New York Times. Day had withdrawn himself from the film's promotion and condemned the misconduct in light of the allegations before the film's public release was canceled.

In addition to Pacific Rim Uprising, in 2018, Day was in Drew Pearce's film Hotel Artemis, with Jodie Foster, Sterling K. Brown, Sofia Boutella, Jeff Goldblum, Brian Tyree Henry, Jenny Slate, Zachary Quinto, and Dave Bautista, where he played Acapulco the arms dealer. Day played his first leading role in a romantic comedy as Peter in I Want You Back with Jenny Slate for Amazon Studios, which released on February 11, 2022.

Day got his first film voice acting role in 2013 as the character Art in the Pixar animated film Monsters University. Following this, he voiced Benny in The Lego Movie (2014) and its sequel The Lego Movie 2: The Second Part (2019). In September 2021, Nintendo announced that Day would voice Luigi in The Super Mario Bros. Movie, which released on April 5, 2023. Day reprised his role in the 2026 film The Super Mario Galaxy Movie. He has also expressed interest in reprising the role in a Luigi's Mansion film.

In 2018, Day began working on his feature directorial debut Fool's Paradise (previously titled El Tonto), starring Ken Jeong and himself, and featuring Ray Liotta, Kate Beckinsale, Adrien Brody, Common, Jason Sudeikis, Edie Falco, and John Malkovich. Besides writing and producing, Day co-stars as a silent man from a psychiatric hospital who accidentally finds his way into celebrity with the help of an enterprising publicist (Jeong) before they lose it all. The film underwent several reshoots and was released on May 12, 2023. The film made $885,712 at the box office worldwide and received a 38% on review aggregator Rotten Tomatoes, with the critic consensus reading, "Fool's Paradise suggests Charlie Day may have a bright future as a director, but he'll need to find smarter and more consistently funny scripts."

In 2023, it was announced that Day would star in the dark comedy film Kill Me (2026), directed and written by Peter Warren.

In 2025, Day played supporting roles in two films. He was club owner Rick Richards in Jillian Bell's directorial debut, Summer of 69, and police detective Marty Metakawich in Ethan Coen's Honey Don't!. That same year, he also guest starred as his It's Always Sunny character in the ABC sitcom Abbott Elementary during a cross-over event.

== Personal life ==
A skilled musician, Day can play the piano, trombone, guitar, and harmonica as well as sing. He has written or improvised most of the songs featured on It's Always Sunny in Philadelphia. In 2023, Day joined American rock band Portugal. The Man during their show at the Hollywood Bowl to perform It's Always Sunny's "Dayman".

In 2001, Day met actress Mary Elizabeth Ellis in a New York City bar. They were already dating in 2004 when they co-starred as incestuous siblings on Reno 911!. Ellis has a recurring role on It's Always Sunny as The Waitress, the object of the unrequited love and obsession for Day's character. The couple married on March 4, 2006. They had their only child, a son, in December 2011. They live in Los Angeles, California.

In 2014, Day received an honorary doctorate in performing arts from Merrimack College, where he also delivered that year's keynote address.

Day has stated with uncertainty that he is agnostic.

== Filmography ==
Key
†	Denotes films that have not yet been released

Year	Title	Role	Notes	Ref.
2001	Late Summer	Trevor	Short film	
2001	Campfire Stories	Joe Boner		
2002	Bad Company	Stoner	Uncredited	
2005	Love Thy Neighbor	Video clerk		
2008	A Quiet Little Marriage	Adam		
2010	Going the Distance	Dan		
2011	Horrible Bosses	Dale Arbus		
2013	Monsters University	Art (voice)		
2013	Pacific Rim	Dr. Newton Geiszler		
2014	Party Central	Art (voice)	Short film	
2014	The Lego Movie	Benny (voice)		
2014	Horrible Bosses 2	Dale Arbus		
2015	Vacation	Chad		
2016	The Hollars	Jason		
2017	Fist Fight	Andrew "Andy" Campbell	Also executive producer	
2017	I Love You, Daddy	Ralph		
2018	Pacific Rim Uprising	Dr. Newton Geiszler		
2018	Hotel Artemis	Acapulco		
2019	The Lego Movie 2: The Second Part	Benny (voice)		
2021	How It Ends	Lonny		
2022	I Want You Back	Peter	Also executive producer	
2023	The Super Mario Bros. Movie	Luigi (voice)		
2023	Fool's Paradise	Latte Pronto / Sir Tom Bingsley	Also director and screenwriter	
2025	Summer of 69	Rick Richards		
2025	Honey Don't!	Marty Metakawich		
2026	Kill Me	Jimmy	Also producer	
2026	The Super Mario Galaxy Movie	Luigi (voice)		
2026	Wildwood	Dmitri (voice)		
2026	Golf Trip †	TBA	Filming	

=== Television ===
Year	Title	Role	Notes	Ref.
2000	Mary and Rhoda	Mailroom Kid	Television film	
2000	Madigan Men	Clerk	Episode: "Three Guys, a Girl and a Conversation Nook"	
2001	Law & Order	Jeremy	Episode: "Swept Away – A Very Special Episode"	
2001–2004	Third Watch	Michael Boscorelli	5 episodes	
2003	Luis	Richie	10 episodes	
2004	Reno 911!	Inbred Twin	Episode: "Not Without My Mustache"	
2005–present	It's Always Sunny in Philadelphia	Charles "Charlie" Kelly	Main cast; Also executive producer and writer	
2011–2012	How to Be a Gentleman	—N/a	Consulting producer (8 episodes)	
2011, 2012	Saturday Night Live	Himself (host), Congressman Fenton Worthington Carrey	Episodes: "Charlie Day/Maroon 5", "Jamie Foxx/Ne-Yo"	
2012	Unsupervised	Jesse Judge (voice)	Episode: "Jesse Judge Lawncare Incorporated"; Also executive producer (13 episodes)	
2012	American Dad!	Meth Head (voice)	Episode: "Adventures in Hayleysitting"	
2012	Fanboy and Chum Chum	Lucky Charlie (voice)	Episode: "Lucky Chums"	
2014	Drunk History	Allan Pinkerton	Episode: "Baltimore"	
2018–2019	The Cool Kids	Chet the handyman	Episode: "Pilot"; Also co-creator, executive producer and writer	
2020–2025	Mythic Quest	Spencer	Episode: "Rebrand"; Also co-creator and executive producer	
2023	Bupkis	Glen Rossi	Episode: "Picture"	
2025	Abbott Elementary	Charlie Kelly	Episode: "Volunteers"; Crossover with It's Always Sunny in Philadelphia	
2025	Rick and Morty	Salva-tron (voice)	Episode: "Morty Daddy"	

=== Video games ===
Year	Title	Voice role	Ref.
2013	Disney Infinity	Art	
2015	Lego Dimensions	Benny	

=== Web ===
Year	Title	Role	Notes	Ref.
2021–2023	The Always Sunny Podcast	Himself/host	74 episodes	

=== Music video appearances ===
Year	Title	Artist	Notes	Ref.
2022	"If I Didn't Love You"	Ben Abraham	Co-starred with Mary Elizabeth Ellis	

=== Theme park attractions ===
Year	Title	Role	Notes	Ref.
2016	The Lego Movie: 4D – A New Adventure	Benny (voice)		

== Theater ==
Year	Title	Role	Notes	Ref.
1997	Dead End	2nd Ave Gang #1		
1997	Princess Turandot	The Second Eunuch		
1997	Johnny On a Spot	Fred		
1999	Camino Real	Abdullah		
1999	Quark Victory	Newt		
2000	A Servant of Two Masters	Pantaloon		

== Awards and nominations ==
Year	Award	Category	Work	Result	Ref.
2011	Critics' Choice Television Award	Best Actor in a Comedy Series	It's Always Sunny in Philadelphia	Nominated	
2011	Satellite Awards	Best Actor – Television Series Musical or Comedy	It's Always Sunny in Philadelphia	Nominated	
2015	MTV Movie & TV Awards	#WTF Moment	Horrible Bosses 2	Nominated	
2015	Teen Choice Awards	Choice Movie Actor: Comedy	Horrible Bosses 2	Nominated	
2015	Teen Choice Awards	Choice Movie: Chemistry	Horrible Bosses 2	Nominated	
2015	Teen Choice Awards	Choice Movie: Hissy Fit	Horrible Bosses 2	Nominated	
2017	Teen Choice Awards	Choice Movie: Fight	Fist Fight	Nominated	
