= Look Who's Talking (franchise) =

Film franchise article

- Official franchise logo
- Starring: John Travolta; Kirstie Alley; Bruce Willis; Roseanne Barr; Danny DeVito; Diane Keaton; David Gallagher; Tabitha Lupien; Various actors (see below)
- Production company: TriStar Pictures
- Distributed by: Sony Pictures Entertainment
- Release dates: October 13, 1989 (Look Who's Talking); December 14, 1990 (Look Who's Talking Too); November 5, 1993 (Look Who's Talking Now!)
- Country: United States
- Language: English
- Box office: $355,061,198

The Look Who's Talking franchise consists of American romantic family-comedies, including three theatrical films and a television series spin-off. The plot of each installment centers around a combined family, and their efforts to create the best lives for their infant children, while the infant children seek to help their parents through the use of an internal storytelling device, which the audience can hear. The central characters experience comedic and trying experiences that ultimately bring them closer together as a family unit.

The original film was met with mild critical reception, though it was deemed a hit box office. In years since, the film has earned its status as a cultural classic. Its first sequel in contrast was received poorly by critics, and earned less than half of its predecessor. The third film was considered a disappointment both critically and financially. Similarly, the television series spin-off received negative response from critics and viewers alike. Despite this, the two sequels have found a modern-day fanbase with critic reanalysis including the two installments in "so bad [they're] good" movie lists. Following the death of Kirstie Alley, various sources described the series as one of the greatest roles of her career.

== Film ==
Film	U.S. release date	Director	Screenwriter	Producer
Look Who's Talking	October 13, 1989	Amy Heckerling	Amy Heckerling	Jonathan D. Krane
Look Who's Talking Too	December 14, 1990	Amy Heckerling	Amy Heckerling & Neal Israel	Jonathan D. Krane
Look Who's Talking Now!	November 5, 1993	Tom Ropelewski	Tom Ropelewski & Leslie Dixon	Jonathan D. Krane

=== Look Who's Talking (1989) ===
An accountant named Mollie Jensen regularly finds herself facing romantic hardships, with skepticism from her friends. When Mollie has a sexual encounter with a married man named Albert, she becomes pregnant. Though Albert promises to end his marriage for her, it is soon discovered that he is a womanizer and has no intentions of helping raise the child. Upon going into labor, Mollie travels by taxi to the nearest hospital with the help of a driver named James Ubriacco. After the hospital staff mistakes James as the father, Mollie gives birth to her son who she names Michael.

Though a single parent, Mollie determines to find what she believes will make a suitable father for her son, while her friendship with James strengthens, all while James becomes close with her baby "Mikey". As romantic feelings begin to build between them, Albert attempts to reinsert himself into Mollie and Mikey's lives. As Mollie tries to determine whether she wants to rekindle a relationship with Albert or whether her working-class friend James could be a suitable father, Mikey determines to serve as the catalyst that finally brings Mollie and James together.

=== Look Who's Talking Too (1990) ===
James and Mollie prepare for the arrival of a new baby girl, while the couple begins to toilet train Mikey. James begins to work more consistently in his piloting job so that he can earn a higher income for his family, after being encouraged by Mollie's parents to do so. As the due date approaches, Mikey becomes excited for his new role as the older brother. Returning home after an emergency c-section birth of their baby, Mikey discovers that his little sister named Julie isn't impressed. The family endure the comedic experiences of a toddler and an infant in the house. As James has a demanding schedule at work, Mollie's impassive brother Stuart comes to stay with them as a means to assist with the housekeeping and babysitting.

The differences between James and Stuart add to the stressed communications between the couple, and the pair decides to separate for an unseeable future. Believing that their father left because of the new baby, Mikey becomes resentful towards Julie and a rivalry between them ensues. Though James remains involved with his children, Mollie begins to realize that he is missing the milestone events of their children, including Julie's first steps. Learning of severe storms that were coming, Mollie rushes to the airport to ask James to stay with hopes of bringing him back home. Leaving the children in the care of Stuart, she arrives just as the flight towers cancel the trip. Following a series of dangerous events including a robbery and a house fire, Mikey and Julie realize how much they care for each other, while the Ubriacco strengthens their relationships as a family.

=== Look Who's Talking Now! (1993) ===
Years later, the Ubriacco family continues to grow with James and Mollie determining that the family needs a dog. Though James has become a private pilot for a rich cosmetics tycoon named Samantha, he continues to search for opportunities to be involved with the lives of his family members. Though Mollie is initially suspicious and worries if James will cheat on her, she realizes that it is Samantha that has questionable intentions. After returning from the animal shelter with a formerly-stray mutt named Rocks who has bonded with Mikey, the family is surprised by Samantha who was brought her poodle named Daphne as a gift for James. Though the family doesn't know how to manage two different dogs, they do their best as Julie has also bonded with Daphne. Through their internal voices, the dogs begin to share their talents with one another and build a friendship overcoming their rivalry.

Just before Christmas, James is required by Samantha to be present for what she has called a meeting with an important client, only to find that she has brought him to an isolated cabin to be alone with her. Trapped in a snowstorm and avoiding her advances, James calls his family explaining the situation. Determined to "bring Christmas" to James, and with the combined help of Rocks and Daphne, the entire Ubriacco family travels through the woods searching for the cabin.

=== Future ===
In 2010, a reboot of the franchise was announced as being in development. The story was reported as being centered around an adult aged Michael "Mikey", who is about to reach fatherhood in the film. Neal H. Moritz was attached as producer. In 2019, Jeremy Garelick and Adam Fields joined as writer/director and an additional producer, respectively. The project is a joint-venture production between Sony Pictures and Screen Gems. In February 2020, Travolta and Alley expressed interest in reprising their roles from the original trilogy now in the role of grandparents. With Alley's death in December 2022 from colon cancer, the status of this project is uncertain.

== Television ==
Initially developed as a television adaptation of Look Who's Talking, the associated studios and networks reworked the series to be an official spin-off to the films. Produced and aired through American Broadcasting Company (ABC), the series followed a similar premise to the films. The plot centered around Maggie Campbell, a single mother who manages her responsibilities while also searching for a suitable father for her son, an infant named Mickey, who vocalizes his perceptions of the world to the viewing audience, through the storytelling technique of an internal voice. Maggie welcomes the romantic advances of various single men, while Mickey tries to determine who is best for his mother. Following the overall negative critical reception of the first season, the producers and associated studios recast the majority of the principal cast, while also moving the characters to a new city.

== Recurring cast and characters ==
List indicators

This section includes characters who will appear or have appeared in the franchise in main roles.

- An empty grey cell indicates the character was not in the film, or that the character's official presence has not yet been confirmed.
- ^{C} indicates a cameo role.
- ^{V} indicates a voice-only role.

Character	Films			Television	
Character	Look Who's Talking	Look Who's Talking Too	Look Who's Talking Now!	Baby Talk	
Character	Look Who's Talking	Look Who's Talking Too	Look Who's Talking Now!	Season one	Season two
James Ubriacco	John Travolta	John Travolta	John Travolta		
Mollie Jensen-Ubriacco	Kirstie Alley	Kirstie Alley	Kirstie Alley		
Rosie Jensen	Olympia Dukakis	Olympia Dukakis	Olympia Dukakis		
Michael "Mikey" Ubriacco	Christopher Aydon Bruce Willis^{V} (Note: The character is also portrayed physically by various actors at different ages, including: Jason Schaller from the age of a fetus to a newborn, Jaryd Waterhouse at four-months, and Jacob Haines at one-year.)	Lorne Sussman Bruce Willis^{V}	David Gallagher		
Julie Ubriacco	Uncredited infant Joan Rivers^{V}	Megan Milner Roseanne Barr^{V} (Note: The character is also portrayed physically by various actors at different ages, including: Nikki Graham from the age of a fetus to a newborn, and Georgia Keithley at four-months. Travolta and Alley additionally voice the respective sperm and egg of their characters, during conception.)	Tabitha Lupien		
Rocks Ubriacco			Uncredited Irish wire fox terrier-mutt Danny DeVito^{V}		
Daphne Ubriacco			Uncredited White coat poodle Diane Keaton^{V}		
Maggie Campbell				Connie Sellecca (Note: Sellecca was cast to portray the character, before ultimately dropping out of the series due to creative differences. She was ultimately replaced by Duffy, though despite this, segments of her portrayal were aired during a 1990 ABC Fall Preview Show.) Julia Duffy	Mary Page Keller
Mickey Campbell				Ryan Jessup & Paul Jessup Tony Danza^{V}	Ryan Jessup & Paul Jessup Tony Danza^{V}
Doris Campbell					Polly Bergen
Joe				George Clooney	
Dr. Elliot Fleisher				Tom Alan Robbins	Tom Alan Robbins
James Holbrook					Scott Baio
Anita Craig					Francesca P. Roberts
Danielle Craig					Alicia Johnson & Celicia Johnson Vernee Watson-Johnson^{V}
Tony Craig					Wayne Collins

== Additional production and crew details ==
Film	Crew/Detail					
Film	Composer	Cinematographer(s)	Editor(s)	Production companies	Distributing company	Running time
Look Who's Talking	David Kitay	Thomas Del Ruth	Debra Chiate	Tri-Star Pictures, M.C.E.G. Productions Inc.	Sony Pictures Entertainment	1 hr 36 mins
Look Who's Talking Too	David Kitay	Thomas Del Ruth	Debra Chiate	Tri-Star Pictures, Big Mouth Productions	Sony Pictures Entertainment	1 hr 22 mins
Baby Talk	Bill Maxwell	Daniel Flannery & Dan Kuleto	Charlie Bowyer & Richard Russel	Columbia Pictures Television, Weinberger Company	American Broadcasting Company	17 hrs 30 mins (30 mins/episode)
Look Who's Talking Now!	William Ross	Oliver Stapleton	Henry Hitner & Michael A. Stevenson	TriStar Pictures	Sony Pictures Entertainment	1 hr 35 mins

== Reception ==
=== Box office and financial performance ===
Film	Box office gross			Box office ranking		Budget	Worldwide net total income	Ref.
Film	North America	Other territories	Worldwide	All-time North America	All-time worldwide	Budget	Worldwide net total income	Ref.
Look Who's Talking	$140,088,813	$157,011,187	$297,100,000	#463	#662	$7,500,000	$289,600,000	
Look Who's Talking Too	$47,789,074	—N/a	$47,789,074	#1,981	#3,192	Information not publicly available	≤$47,789,074	
Look Who's Talking Now!	$10,172,124	—N/a	$10,172,124	#5,279	#7,464	Information not publicly available	≤$10,172,124	
Totals	$198,050,011	$157,011,187	$355,061,198	x̄ #2,574	x̄ #3,773	>$7,500,000	≤$347,561,198	

=== Critical and public response ===
Film	Rotten Tomatoes	Metacritic	CinemaScore
Look Who's Talking	55% (38 reviews)	51/100 (15 reviews)	A
Look Who's Talking Too	13% (16 reviews)	—N/a	B
Baby Talk	0% (10 reviews)	30/100 (6 reviews)	—N/a
Look Who's Talking Now!	0% (25 reviews)	26/100 (19 reviews)	B+
