= Look Who's Talking =

1989 film by Amy Heckerling

- Theatrical release poster
- Directed by: Amy Heckerling
- Written by: Amy Heckerling
- Produced by: Jonathan D. Krane
- Starring: John Travolta; Kirstie Alley; Olympia Dukakis; George Segal; Abe Vigoda; Bruce Willis
- Cinematography: Thomas Del Ruth
- Edited by: Debra Chiate
- Music by: David Kitay
- Production companies: M.C.E.G. Productions, Inc.
- Distributed by: Tri-Star Pictures
- Release date: October 13, 1989
- Running time: 96 minutes
- Country: United States
- Language: English
- Budget: $10 million
- Box office: $297 million

Look Who's Talking is a 1989 American romantic comedy film written and directed by Amy Heckerling and produced by M.C.E.G. Productions, Inc. and released on October 13, 1989 by Tri-Star Pictures. Starring John Travolta and Kirstie Alley, the film concerns the relationship between single mother Mollie Jensen (Alley) and her infant son Mikey's babysitter James Ubriacco (Travolta). Bruce Willis provides the voice of Mikey's precocious thoughts, heard only by the audience. The film also features Olympia Dukakis, George Segal and Abe Vigoda in supporting roles.

The film received mixed reviews from critics, but it was nevertheless an enormous box office success, grossing $297 million worldwide on its budget of $7.5 million. This success launched a titular franchise, including two sequels Look Who's Talking Too (1990) and Look Who's Talking Now! (1993), and a television series spin-off titled Baby Talk.

== Plot ==
Mollie Jensen, an accountant living in New York City, becomes pregnant during an affair with Albert, a married client. The fetus, heard only by the audience, begins making commentary on his development.

Albert assures Mollie that he will leave his wife Beth to be with her, but in her ninth month, while out shopping, Mollie and her friend Rona catch Albert with yet another woman, Melissa. The heartbreak and stress cause Mollie to go into labor. A taxi driver, James Ubriacco, speeds through downtown traffic to get her to the hospital in time and subsequently witnesses the baby's birth after being mistaken for the father. Mollie becomes a dedicated single mother to baby Mikey, whose thoughts the audience continues to hear.

James tracks Mollie down using the purse she left in the cab and convinces her to allow him to use her Manhattan address to help him set up nursing care for his grandfather Vincent in exchange for his services as a babysitter. Over the next several months, James develops a bond with Mikey as Mollie goes on several failed dates in hopes of finding him a suitable stepfather. Mikey, having seen his friends' fathers at the playground, decides that James should be his father.

James, who moonlights as a flight instructor, takes Mollie flying, and she begins to fall for him. James tells Mollie that he loves her and Mikey, but she believes he is too immature to be Mikey's father. Things get worse when Mollie is forced to work with Albert again, and he attempts to re-insert himself into Mikey's life. When he shows up to Mollie's apartment unannounced, James, who had thought Mollie was artificially inseminated, gets into a fight with him, and Mollie admits that it might be best for everyone if James wasn't in Mikey's life. Mollie allows James to say goodbye to Mikey; he gives him a few pieces of fatherly advice as Mollie listens over the baby monitor.

Mollie soon realizes that Albert, despite promising to be there for Mikey, is too selfish and work-obsessed to even pay attention to their son, and she leaves him for good. Later that day, Mollie and James are both called to Vincent's retirement home to intervene in a miscommunication between him and the staff. Mollie defuses the situation just as James arrives, and they make up.

Meanwhile, Mikey wanders off when he sees what he thinks is James's taxi and ends up standing in the middle of traffic. James comes to his rescue, and Mikey says his first real word: "Da-da". James and Mollie realize that Mikey already sees James as his father and they decide to give their relationship a chance, kissing passionately while Mikey considers telling them he needs a new diaper. Nine months later, Mollie gives birth to her and James' daughter and Mikey's sister Julie, complete with her own inner voice.

== Cast ==
- John Travolta as James Ubriacco, a taxi driver who also works as a flight instructor
- Kirstie Alley as Mollie Jensen, an accountant and Mikey's mother
- Olympia Dukakis as Rosie Jensen, Mollie's mother and Mikey's grandmother
- George Segal as Albert, Mikey's biological father
- Abe Vigoda as Vincent Ubriacco, James' grandfather
- Bruce Willis as Mikey Jensen, Mollie's son (voice)
  - Jason Schaller, Jaryd Waterhouse, Jacob Haines, and Christopher Aydon portray Mikey as a fetus/newborn, at 4 months, and at 1 and 2 years, respectively
- Twink Caplan as Rona, Mollie's co-worker and best friend
- Joy Boushel as Melissa, Albert's interior decorator and mistress
- Don S. Davis as Dr. Fleisher
- Louis Heckerling as Lou Jensen
- Andrea Mann as Salesgirl
- William B. Davis as Doctor
- Jerry Wasserman as Mr. Anal
- Neal Israel as Mr. Ross
- Mollie Israel as Little Girl
- Gerry Bean as Pilot
- Joan Rivers as Julie Ubriacco (uncredited voice)

== Production ==
The idea for the film came shortly after the birth of Amy Heckerling's daughter Mollie Israel in 1985. Heckerling recalled: "We'd be making up lines and I thought, this is a movie". Harold Ramis believed the character of Albert (George Segal) to be based on himself, as he was secretly the biological father of Heckerling's child. Like Albert, Ramis was in the process of leaving his wife Anne Plotkin during Heckerling's pregnancy but ultimately ended up with a third woman, Erica Mann.

== Reception ==
The film received mixed reviews. On the review aggregator website Rotten Tomatoes, 56% of 39 critics' reviews are positive, with an average rating of 5.5/10. The website's consensus reads: "Look Who's Talking holds some appeal thanks to its affable stars and Amy Heckerling's energetic direction, but a silly script doesn't allow wit to get a word in edgewise." Metacritic, which uses a weighted average, assigned the film a score of 51 out of 100, based on 15 critics, indicating "mixed or average" reviews. Audiences polled by CinemaScore gave the film an average grade of "A" on an A+ to F scale.

Look Who's Talking was a surprise hit, opening at number one in the United States with $12,107,784 in its opening weekend and staying at number one for five weekends with grosses over $10 million each weekend. It eventually grossed $140,088,813 domestically and a worldwide total of $296,999,813, making it John Travolta's most successful film in eleven years since Grease, the fourth highest-grossing film of 1989, and Columbia TriStar's highest-grossing film overseas, surpassing Kramer vs. Kramer.

The film was released in the United Kingdom on April 6, 1990, and topped the country's box office that weekend.

== Sequels ==
The film was successful enough to spawn two sequels: Look Who's Talking Too (1990) and Look Who's Talking Now! (1993). John Travolta, Kirstie Alley and Olympia Dukakis are the only actors to appear in all three films in the series. The success of the first two films also inspired an ABC sitcom called Baby Talk, which aired from 1991 to 1992, and featured Tony Danza as the voice of baby Mickey Campbell.

In 2010, Fast & Furious producer Neal H. Moritz was planning to reboot the series, with the Mikey character now grown up and the father of the baby in the film. In 2019, director Jeremy Garelick was writing the script for the reboot. In February 2020, Travolta and Alley expressed interest in reprising their roles from the original trilogy now in the role of grandparents. With Alley's death in December 2022 from colon cancer, the status of this project is uncertain.
