= The Lost Patrol =

American rock band

- The Lost Patrol performing in a 2010 concert at Whisky a Go Go

Background information
- Origin: Piermont
- Genres: Gothic rock, shoegazing, folk, experimental
- Years active: 1999–present
- Label: Self-released
- Members: Stephen Masucci; Michael Williams; Mollie Israel
- Past members: Seth Clifford; Danielle Kimak-Stauss; Gail Buchanan; John Rarrick; Don Snook; Joe Pascrell; Carrie Ingber
- Website: Official website

The Lost Patrol is an American rock band whose music falls into the categories of experimental, gothic, post-punk, dark wave, ethereal wave, folk, alternative country, shoegazing, Spaghetti Western and "surf-a-billy". The band uses electric guitars, 12-string acoustic guitars, Moog and other synthesizers.

The band currently consists of Stephen Masucci, Michael Williams and Mollie Israel (the daughter of noted filmmaker Amy Heckerling and Neal Israel, biological daughter of Harold Ramis). The band began writing their own music in 1999, with two members touring as an instrumental duo at that time. Prior to forming the band, Masucci had music in two films by Hal Hartley, Flirt and The Book of Life.

In 2004, The Lost Patrol was featured by WFMU DJ Irwin Chusid on his show Gender Bias. Chusid's WFMU colleague Bob Brainen featured a live appearance by the band. Music critic Chris Gerard named their album Launch And Landing as one of the Top 20 Albums of 2007. The Lost Patrol returned to WFMU with the current lineup in 2013 for a live set on the early morning show, Dark Night of the Soul with Julie.

In mid-August 2010, The Lost Patrol went on location to Detroit, Michigan to film for the new Amy Heckerling film Vamps. On September 27, 2010, their song “On The Run” from their album, Midnight Matinée was featured in The CW hit show Gossip Girl. Also, on January 23, 2012, their song "This Road Is Long" from their album, "Rocket Surgery" was featured again on Gossip Girl.

In February 2012, Hal Hartley released his new film Meanwhile, which featured The Lost Patrol's track "Nobody There" from their 2010 album, Dark Matter.

The Lost Patrol's song "Homecoming" from their album Midnight Matinée also appears in the hit found footage film Chronicle.

The Lost Patrol holds the US trademark on the band name.

== Personnel ==
Current members:

- Stephen Masucci (all guitars, synths, lap steel, bass, programming)
- Mollie Israel (vocals, harp, percussion)
- Michael Williams (12-string acoustics, keyboards, vocals)

== Discography ==
=== Studio albums ===
- The Lost Patrol (1999)
- Creepy Cool (2001)
- Off Like a Prom Dress (2003)
- High Noon (2004)
- Lonesome Sky (2005)
- Launch and Landing (2007)
- Midnight Matinée (2008)
- Dark Matter (2010)
- Rocket Surgery (2011)
- Driven (2013)
- Chasing Shadows (2014)

=== EPs ===
- Scattered, Smothered & Covered EP (2002)

=== Other ===
The Lost Patrol also appear on the compilation albums:

- Under the Radar (magazine) - 10th Anniversary Issue Compilation (2011)
- Rock Back for Japan - Volume 6 (Patetico Recordings, 2011)
- Innocence is Bliss (Dionysus Records, 2006)
- WFMU Gone Wild DVD (2005)
- WBJB "The Night" NJ/NPR Local Artists Sampler (2005)
- 2NMC Festival Sampler, Nashville New Music Festival (2001)

== Film soundtrack ==
The Lost Patrol provided the music soundtrack to Ryan Dacko’s documentary feature film Plan 9 from Syracuse.

The Lost Patrol's "Nobody There" featured on Hal Hartley's Meanwhile soundtrack.
