= Look Who's Talking Too =

1990 film by Amy Heckerling

- Theatrical release poster
- Directed by: Amy Heckerling
- Written by: Amy Heckerling; Neal Israel
- Produced by: Jonathan D. Krane
- Starring: John Travolta; Kirstie Alley; Bruce Willis; Roseanne Barr; Damon Wayans; Olympia Dukakis; Elias Koteas
- Cinematography: Thomas Del Ruth
- Edited by: Debra Chiate
- Music by: David Kitay
- Production company: Big Mouth Production
- Distributed by: Tri-Star Pictures
- Release date: December 14, 1990
- Running time: 82 minutes
- Country: United States
- Language: English
- Box office: $120.9 million

Look Who's Talking Too is a 1990 American romantic comedy film, a sequel to Look Who's Talking, and the second installment in the franchise. The film was directed by Amy Heckerling from a script she co-authored with Neal Israel. The film stars the original cast members John Travolta and Kirstie Alley as James and Mollie Ubriacco, the parents of Mikey (voiced by Bruce Willis), a toddler coping with the newest addition to the family, baby Julie (voiced by Roseanne Barr). In addition to this, he is having trouble using a potty, and the unorthodox advice he gets from his playmate, Eddie (voiced by Damon Wayans), doesn't make his problem any better.

Look Who's Talking Too was released by Tri-Star Pictures on December 14, 1990. The film received negative reviews from critics and grossed $120.9 million.

== Plot ==
Several months after getting married, Mollie and James Ubriacco welcome their child, Mikey's half-sister Julie into the family. While at first, Mikey is excited to be a big brother, he begins to resent Julie shortly after she is born when the reality does not match what he dreamed being a big brother would be like. He finds Julie annoying and resents sharing both toys and his parents attention; being constantly mean to her as a result. In turn, Julie is not impressed by Mikey, who struggles with potty training, having several accidents despite encouragement from his friends and family.

James is provided a job as a full time pilot thanks to Mollie's parents Rosie and Lou and the longer work hours strain James and Mollie's relationship. They also have parenting disputes with James believing Mollie to be overprotective and too high strung. Mollie's lazy younger brother Stuart comes to live with them temporarily, and James is upset that Mollie does not even consult him about it. James is further frustrated when Stuart pulls an unloaded gun on him thinking he's an intruder. He wants Stuart out immediately and Mollie insists on talking to him first seeing nothing wrong with him having a gun or leaving messes everywhere. James finally reaches his breaking point and storms out of the apartment. Mikey thinks Julie is responsible for the situation and takes his vengeance out on Julie's stuffed bird Herbie. Meanwhile, after her apartment is robbed, Mollie's friend Rona comes to stay with them, and she begins to date Stuart.

During one of James' visits, he takes Mikey and Julie to the movies. Mikey finally realizes he was too hard on Julie and she wasn't to blame for James leaving. Later, when Julie decides she doesn't need Mikey and wants to strike out on her own, she is inspired to walk unsupported. Mollie sees this and showers Julie with affection for her accomplishment, but the happiness is short lived, as James is not there to share the moment. James returns home to talk to Mollie and Mikey accomplishes going to the bathroom on his own, which is a celebration both of them share with him.

James is due to go flying despite a massive storm building in the area, Mollie gets worried and leaves Mikey and Julie in Stuart's care. While she is gone, a robber sneaks into the apartment and Stuart scares him out with his gun. Forgetting that Mikey and Julie are in the apartment Stuart gives chase leaving them home alone. He also left the stove on and a towel on the stove causes a fire to spread through the kitchen. Thinking quickly, Mikey pushes Julie in her bouncer out of harm's way. He promises to take care of her when she tells him she is afraid of the "hot stuff" which he tells her not to touch.

Meanwhile, James and Mollie make up in the plane when the flight is canceled. James asks Mollie if she's happy about being right; she tells him that she loves him and no longer cares about who's right. They return home to see the fire through the kitchen window. Momentarily panicked, they are relieved as Mikey exits the elevator with Julie in tow. James runs to the apartment and puts out the fire before any major damage is caused. Mollie admits that leaving the kids with Stuart was a bad idea which James is pleased to hear. Later at a family barbecue, Julie and Mikey have a conversation on how strange adults are. Julie is grateful to Mikey for saving them from the fire and he sees how much they are needed in each others lives. He tells Julie that it is them against the grown-ups and that he loves her. She agrees saying "big ones don't make any sense" and the two walk off together hand in hand.

== Cast ==
- John Travolta as James Ubriacco
- Kirstie Alley as Mollie Jensen Ubriacco
- Olympia Dukakis as Rosie Jensen
- Elias Koteas as Stuart Jensen
- Twink Caplan as Rona
- Lorne Sussman as Mikey Ubriacco
  - Bruce Willis as Mikey Ubriacco (voice)
- Megan Milner as Julie Ubriacco (age 1 year)
  - Georgia Keithley as Julie Ubriacco (age 4 months)
  - Nikki Graham as Julie Ubriacco (fetus–newborn)
  - Roseanne Barr as Julie Ubriacco (voice)
- Danny Pringle as Eddie
  - Damon Wayans as Eddie (voice)
- Gilbert Gottfried as Joey
- Mel Brooks as Mr. Toilet Man (voice)
- Louis Heckerling as Lou Jensen
- Neal Israel as Mr. Ross
- Lesley Ewen as Debbie
- Doug Warhit as Client
- Terry David Mulligan as IRS Inspector
- Paul Shaffer as Businessman
- Don S. Davis as Dr. Fleischer
- Morris Panych as Businessman
- Rick Avery as Burglar
- Mollie Israel as Dream Friend

== Production ==
An extended and re-arranged version of the famous Tri-Star Pictures theme music, originally composed by Dave Grusin and composed and arranged by David Kitay, was played during the scene when Julie Ubriacco (Megan Milner) practices walking. A variation with the standard version of the fanfare, which was credited at the end, exists at the beginning of the logo when Bruce Willis (voice of Mikey Ubriacco) was doing a Mister Ed imitation.

The final scene at the end of the Look Who's Talking featured an uncredited Joan Rivers providing the voice of Julie. Due to scheduling conflicts, she declined reprising the role. Also appearing are Olympia Dukakis, Elias Koteas and Gilbert Gottfried. Further vocal talents include Damon Wayans in a supporting role as Eddie and Mel Brooks in cameo appearance as the voice of Mr. Toilet Man. Director Amy Heckerling's father, Lou, has a small speaking part as Mollie Jensen (Kirstie Alley)'s father Lou. An early trailer featured Richard Pryor as the voice of Eddie.

When the film aired on Freeform (formerly known as ABC Family), many of its deleted scenes were reincorporated into the film such as Mollie threatening Mikey (Lorne Sussman) with corporal punishment if he walks off with Julie's carriage again were shown. Alley reportedly hated this scene as she was an advocate against corporal punishment. One notable addition is a running gag where Mollie chats with her friends and parents about her relationship with her husband James Ubriacco (John Travolta) and daydreams him cheating on her. There is even one sequence where she imagines him as John Lennon and herself as Yoko Ono parodying their activism. Only one remnant of this gag remains in the theatrical and home media cut. Another cut scene included James and Stuart Jensen (Elias Koteas) having a conversation after he arrives in the apartment.

== Reception ==
Unlike its predecessor, it received mostly negative reviews. On the review aggregator website Rotten Tomatoes, 13% of 16 critics' reviews are positive, with an average rating of 3.5/10. Audiences polled by CinemaScore gave the film an average grade of "B" on an A+ to F scale. The film was released in the United Kingdom on March 22, 1991, and reached number 2 in the country's box office that weekend.

Catherine Dunphy of Toronto Star called it "a movie filled with the kind of thigh-slapping potty jokes only those still not trained could love", while noting that the character of Mikey was "old enough by any pediatric standards to speak for himself by now". Bill Brownstein of the Montreal Gazette called it an "embarrassingly dreadful". Greg Potter of the Vancouver Sun wrote that "if not for the sweet, cherubic countenances of the wee tikes innocently gagaing amid the unscrupulous exploitation and bald-faced money-grubbing of Look Who's Talking Too, this 81-minute testimony to the despicably twisted motives of Hollywood sequel mongers would be even more insufferable".

David Armstrong of the San Francisco Examiner called the film "utterly undistinguished product—witless, vulgar, filled with potty jokes and gags about genitalia, stuffed with can't-miss-'em-product plugs, weighted down with a gratuitous chase-and-fight scene, loaded with old pop songs to underscore what the characters—and thus the audience—are supposed to be feeling". Gene Siskel of the Chicago Tribune called it a "toilet-humored sequel that loses the romance and Innocence that made the original film such a pleasant surprise. John Travolta and Kirstie Alley return with a new baby girl with the voice of Roseanne Barr, who has been given absolutely nothing funny to say. The few infrequent bits of humor come from the laidback voice of Bruce Willis as toddler Mikey. Travolta dances like Elvis in one scene, but director Amy Heckerling manages to louse that up by shooting him too often from the waist up". Steve Murray, in The Atlanta Journal-Constitution, wrote that "the good news is, Look Who's Talking Too is less than 90 minutes long. The bad news? It feels so much longer. [...] Designed to make money, Look Who's Talking Too will probably succeed on that level, though it fails on all others".

Martin F. Kohn of the Detroit Free Press wrote that "the script, by director Amy Heckerling and Neal Israel, provides a dime's worth of characterization and a nickel's worth of plot. The story line is so flimsy that the film deteriorates into a series of music videos [that] are downright delightful compared to some of the minor characters, particularly the kids' mooching, trigger-happy Uncle Stuart and the proprietor of the baby gym, played by one Gilbert Gottfried (picture Richard Simmons with Martha Raye's mouth) whose performance makes Pee-wee Herman look like Sir Laurence Olivier. Incidentally, the voice of the talking toilet is Mel Brooks. Now there's an idea for a sitcom". David Lyman of The Cincinnati Post gave a negative review and called it "humorless", "dismally dull" and "totally devoid of cleverness". Ryan Murphy of Miami Herald gave the film only one star, and stated that "director Amy Heckerling has whipped up a banal entirely soulless cinematic concoction whose main ingredients are vulgar bathroom humor (there are at least two dozen references to poo-poo and pee-pee) and bothersome Mr. Ed baby tricks in which the mouths of poor toddlers and infants are manipulated to produce overdone talking effects".

It grossed $47,789,074 at the box office in the United States and Canada, and $73.1 million internationally, for a worldwide total of $120.9 million.

It was also nominated for two Golden Raspberry Awards, including Worst Supporting Actor for Gilbert Gottfried (for his performances in this film, The Adventures of Ford Fairlane and Problem Child) and Worst Supporting Actress for Roseanne Barr at the 11th Golden Raspberry Awards, and a Stinkers Bad Movie Award for Worst Picture at the 1990 Stinkers Bad Movie Awards.

== Sequel ==
The film was followed by a sequel titled Look Who's Talking Now! in 1993. Once again co-starring John Travolta and Kirstie Alley, alongside David Gallagher and Tabitha Lupien as Mikey and Julie respectively, the film centers around the introduction of two pet dogs to the family. The two animals, Irish-wire fox terrier mutt Rocks and white coat poodle Daphne, who compete for the family's affection were voiced by Danny DeVito and Diane Keaton, respectively.
