= Twink Caplan =

American actress (born 1947)

- Born: Marianne Caplan; 1947 (age 78–79); Mt. Lebanon, Pennsylvania, U.S.
- Education: Mt. Lebanon High School
- Occupations: Actress, comedian, producer
- Years active: 1977–present

Marianne "Twink" Caplan (born 1947) is an American actress, comedian, and producer. She is best known for her roles in the box office hits Clueless (1995) and the Look Who's Talking series. As a producer, her best-known projects are Clueless (1996) (associate producer) and its television spin-off (executive producer).

== Early life ==
Born Marianne Caplan in Mt. Lebanon, Pennsylvania, the younger of two daughters born to Leon Caplan and Theodora "Toby" Schacter, she started dancing at age 3 and made her acting debut two years later at the Pittsburgh Playhouse. A graduate of Mt. Lebanon High School, Caplan went to work at WEEP at age 22, becoming the station's first female on-air personality three years later, with her show Pittsburgh Now.

== Career ==
Caplan is best known for her role as Miss Geist in the 1995 box office hit Clueless, which starred Alicia Silverstone. She went on to executive-produce and reprise the role of Miss Geist in the ABC TV series Clueless.

In the 1989 box office hit Look Who's Talking, Caplan played the flirty best friend of Kirstie Alley, the female lead. She returned as Rona in the moderately successful first sequel Look Who's Talking Too (1990), with Elias Koteas as her love interest. She (and Koteas) declined to appear in the financially unsuccessful second sequel Look Who's Talking Now (1993).

At Sony Pictures Entertainment in 2000, Caplan produced Loser, starring Jason Biggs and Mena Suvari. She played Suvari's character's best friend, Gena, a strip bar worker.

In 2007 she produced the romantic comedy I Could Never Be Your Woman, also appearing in the film as Michelle Pfeiffer's costume designer, Sissy. It marked her 20-year acting reunion with Pfeiffer, who played her best friend in Falling in Love Again.

Caplan played the Home Economics teacher in the television series Fast Times, with Courtney Thorne-Smith, Patrick Dempsey, and Wallace Langham. In The New Homemakers Guide (1988), she played against Ronald Reagan Jr.; she worked with Bonnie Hunt as the nosy neighbour duo living next door to Demi Moore and Judge Reinhold.

In 2012, Caplan appeared as Katie in Tim and Eric's Billion Dollar Movie, with Tim Heidecker, Eric Wareheim, John C. Reilly, Will Ferrell and Zach Galifianakis.

She played the dance teacher in the television series Community in season 1 episode 14, "Interpretive Dance" (2010), and appeared in the 1989 Quantum Leap episode "Thou Shalt Not...".

Caplan played B. Lawney, a waitress with Richard Gere in The Flock (2007), directed by Andrew Lau; Mary Benett, a hard-edged bus driver in CSI: Crime Scene Investigation; and a past-her-prime movie star desperate for a comeback in Secrets of a Hollywood Nurse. She also appeared as Harry Dean Stanton's wife in 9 Full Moons (2013). She also guested as the fall-back fiance of Donny Douglas in Frasier.
