= David Kitay =

American composer

- Born: David Joseph Kitay; October 23, 1961 (age 64); Los Angeles, California, U.S.
- Genre: Film score
- Occupation: Composer
- Website: www.davidkitay.com

David Joseph Kitay (born October 23, 1961) is an American film composer.

== Filmography ==
Year	Title	Director	Notes
1987	The Night Stalker	Max Kleven	
1989	Under the Boardwalk	Fritz Kiersch	
1989	Look Who's Talking	Amy Heckerling	
1990	Nuns on the Run	Jonathan Lynn	
1990	Look Who's Talking Too	Amy Heckerling	
1991	Problem Child 2	Brian Levant	
1991	Passion	Will Mackenzie	Television film
1992	Highway to Hell	Ate de Jong	
1992	Boris and Natasha: The Movie	Charles Martin Smith	Television film
1992	Breaking the Rules	Neal Israel	
1993	Surf Ninjas	Neal Israel	
1993	Roosters	Robert M. Young	
1994	Trading Mom	Tia Brelis	
1994	Father and Scout	Richard Michaels	Television film
1994	The Stoned Age	James Melkonian	
1995	Solomon & Sheba	Robert M. Young	
1995	Jury Duty	John Fortenberry	
1995	Clueless	Amy Heckerling	
1998	Can't Hardly Wait	Deborah Kaplan; Harry Elfont	
1998	A Night at the Roxbury	John Fortenberry	
2000	Mary and Rhoda	Barnet Kellman	Television film
2000	Scary Movie	Keenen Ivory Wayans	
2000	Loser	Amy Heckerling	
2000	Dude, Where's My Car?	Danny Leiner	
2001	Tomcats	Gregory Poirier	
2001	Hounded	Neal Israel	Television film
2001	Ghost World	Terry Zwigoff	
2002	Cadet Kelly	Larry Shaw	Television film
2002	The Stickup	Rowdy Herrington	
2002	The Scream Team	Stuart Gillard	Television film
2003	The One	Ron Lagomarsino	Television film
2003	I Witness	Rowdy Herrington	
2003	How to Deal	Clare Kilner	
2003	Eddie's Million Dollar Cook-Off	Paul Hoen	Television film
2003	Bad Santa	Terry Zwigoff	
2004	Stuck in the Suburbs	Savage Steve Holland	Television film
2004	Harold & Kumar Go to White Castle	Danny Leiner	
2004	Elvis Has Left the Building	Joel Zwick	
2005	Family Plan	David S. Cass Sr.	Television film
2005	Life Is Ruff	Charles Haid	Television film
2005	The Ice Harvest	Harold Ramis	
2006	Art School Confidential	Terry Zwigoff	
2006	The Darwin Awards	Finn Taylor	
2006	Date Movie	Jason Friedberg; Aaron Seltzer	
2006	Relative Strangers	Greg Glienna	
2006	Caffeine	John Cosgrove	
2007	Smiley Face	Gregg Araki	
2007	Because I Said So	Michael Lehmann	
2007	Shanghai Kiss	Kern Konwiser; David Ren	Direct-to-video film
2008	Over Her Dead Body	Jeff Lowell	
2008	Wieners	Mark Steilen	Direct-to-video film
2008	Camp Rock	Matthew Diamond	Television film
2008	My Sassy Girl	Yann Samuell	Direct-to-video film
2009	Mr. Troop Mom	William Dear	Television film
2011	Demoted	J. B. Rogers	
2012	Vamps	Amy Heckerling	
2012	Home Alone: The Holiday Heist	Peter Hewitt	Television film
2013	Aftermath	Thomas Farone	
2017	A Symphony of Hope	Brian Weidling	Documentary film

== Video games ==
Year	Title	Notes
2024	Mario vs. Donkey Kong	Cinematic Composer
