= Fast Times =

American television series

- Also known as: Fast Times at Ridgemont High
- Genre: Sitcom
- Based on: Fast Times at Ridgemont High
- Developed by: Allen Rucker
- Directed by: Amy Heckerling
- Creative director: Cameron Crowe
- Starring: Claudia Wells; Courtney Thorne-Smith; James Nardini; Dean Cameron; Patrick Dempsey; Kit McDonough; Vincent Schiavelli; Ray Walston; Twink Caplan; Wallace Langham
- Opening theme: "Fast Times" performed by Oingo Boingo
- Composers: Danny Elfman; Barry Goldberg; Arthur Barrow; Steve Schiff
- Country of origin: United States
- Original language: English
- No. of seasons: 1
- No. of episodes: 7

Production
- Producers: Amy Heckerling; Jonathan Roberts
- Production location: Glendale, California
- Editor: Debra Chiate
- Camera setup: Single-camera
- Running time: 30 minutes
- Production company: Universal Television

Original release
- Network: CBS
- Release: March 5 – April 23, 1986

Related
- Fast Times at Ridgemont High

Fast Times is an American sitcom based on the 1982 film Fast Times at Ridgemont High that was produced by Amy Heckerling, who directed the original movie. The series ran for 7 episodes on CBS from March 5 until April 23, 1986. Cameron Crowe, who wrote the original Fast Times novel and film screenplay, served as creative consultant. Moon Zappa was hired to research slang terms and mannerisms of teenagers, as she had recently graduated from high school and had a much better grasp of then-current high school behavior than the series writers. Oingo Boingo provided the theme song. Ray Walston as Mr. Hand and Vincent Schiavelli as Mr. Vargas, were the only actors from the film to reprise their roles for the TV series.

== Cast ==
- Claudia Wells as Linda Barrett
- Courtney Thorne-Smith as Stacy Hamilton
- James Nardini as Brad Hamilton
- Wallace Langham as Mark Ratner (credited as Wally Ward)
- Patrick Dempsey as Mike Damone
- Kit McDonough as Leslie Melon
- Dean Cameron as Jeff Spicoli
- Ray Walston as Mr. Hand
- Vincent Schiavelli as Mr. Vargas

== Episodes ==
No.	Title	Directed by	Written by	Original release date
1	"The Last Laugh"	Amy Heckerling	Amy Heckerling, Dennis Rinsler, Marc Warren	March 5, 1986
Mark and Mike devise a plan to get Stacey to date Mark. Brad is having problems staying awake at work. Some of the guys challenge Spicoli to see if Mr. Hand can actually laugh.
2	"Pilot"	Amy Heckerling	Amy Heckerling, Dennis Rinsler, Jonathan Roberts, Marc Warren	March 12, 1986
Linda, who as a rule doesn't date high-school boys, agrees to go out with Brad, but only if no one finds out. Meanwhile, Mr. Hand is betting Spicoli will screw up his class presentation.
3	"The Engagement"	Daniel Attias	David Steven Cohen & Roger S.H. Schulman	March 19, 1986
Linda promises that everyone will get to meet her mysterious fiance from Chicago at her birthday party. Meanwhile, Spicoli starts a rumor that Mr. Hand lost an eye fighting in World War II.
4	"What Is Life?"	Amy Heckerling	Amy Heckerling, Dennis Rinsler, Marc Warren	March 26, 1986
A fast-food entrepreneur dies unexpectedly, leaving one of his employees — Brad — too preoccupied with matters of life and death to perform a lip-sync number in the school talent show.
5	"My Brother, the Car"	Neal Israel	Dennis Rinsler & Marc Warren	April 2, 1986
Brad thinks life has dealt him a cruel blow when Linda asks him out and he has no wheels because his driver's license has been suspended. Meanwhile, Ms. Melon wants to analyze one of Stacy's minor personal problems in class.
6	"My New Best Friend"	Neal Israel	Jonathan Roberts & Allen Rucker	April 9, 1986
Stacy feels left out when Linda starts spending more time with a new friend. Mr. Hand gets promoted to vice headmaster, which he accepts with a mixture of concern and humor.
7	"Secret Romance"	Claudia Weill	Myles Berkowitz & Kevin Parent	April 23, 1986
Stacy disappears on a date with "the perfect guy," someone she just met, and doesn't tell anybody where she's going. Meanwhile, Mr. Vargas loses his zest for teaching and resigns.

== Response ==
Jeff Borden of The Charlotte Observer observed the series' biggest downfall: "The challenge 'Fast Times' faces is emphasizing the comedic elements from the R-rated film while soft-pedaling the teen lust aspects that were a major part of the movie. Comic characters like spaced-out surfer Jeff Spicoli fare well, while subtle characters like fast-food king and would-be ladies man Brad Hamilton are sanitized into blandness."

Christopher Cornell, writing in The Philadelphia Inquirer, echoed the sentiment: "People who liked the movie (read: teenagers) will tune in expecting something like what they saw in the theater. But the network is going to have to completely eliminate the movie's cheerfully rampant drug use and tone down the lusty sexual content, so that parents won't be uncomfortable."

However, Borden calls Fast Times "the hippest look at high school life since the late, lamented Square Pegs few seasons back, yet it treats the teachers with compassion and respect. An 'us vs. them' mentality is avoided." Mike Duffy of the Detroit Press disagreed entirely, saying "With 'Fast Times,' we have 'Dull Pegs'."

Mark Dawidziak of the Akron Beacon Journal was far less than kind to the sitcom: "Just when you thought the CBS Wednesday schedule couldn't get any worse, along comes these two lethal stinkers (Fast Times and another series that preceded it, Tough Cookies). It would be better if the network programmers turned the hour over to repeated tests by the Emergency Broadcast System. It would be better, and considerably more entertaining, if they devoted the hour to a reading of the Newark Yellow Pages. It would be better, and far more merciful, if they just went dark. Just about anything would be kinder than subjecting even a few stray viewers to this video swill. Indeed, Tough Cookies and Fast Times make Stir Crazy look like television's answer to Ulysses."

== Ratings ==
No.	Title	Air Date	Time	Rank	Rating	Viewers (Millions)
1	"The Last Laugh"	March 5, 1986	Wednesday at 8:00 P.M.	#49 of 69	12.4	10.6
2	"Pilot"	March 12, 1996	Wednesday at 8:00 P.M.	#52 of 69	12.4	10.6
3	"The Engagement"	March 19, 1986	Wednesday at 8:00 P.M.	#31 of 65	14.8	12.4
4	"What Is Life?"	March 26, 1986	Wednesday at 8:00 P.M.	#53 of 65	10.6	9.1
5	"My Brother, the Car"	April 12, 1986	Wednesday at 8:00 P.M.	#56 of 67	10.9	9.3
6	"My New Best Friend"	April 9, 1986	Wednesday at 8:00 P.M.	#57 of 71	10.7	9.2
7	"Secret Romance"	April 23, 1986	Wednesday at 8:00 P.M.	#43 of 64	10.6	10.1

Source: A.C. Nielsen Company via Los Angeles Times
