= Ryan Dacko =

American filmmaker (born 1978)

Ryan Dacko (born 1978) is an independent filmmaker based in Syracuse, New York. Dacko served in the United States Coast Guard and used his free time while on a tour of duty at Antarctica to create the screenplay of And I Lived, a melodrama about high school lovers threatened by peer pressure and class warfare. And I Lived debuted at the B-Movie Film Festival in 2005 and won two awards.

In 2007, Dacko premiered Plan 9 from Syracuse, a documentary that followed his attempt to gain attention from a prominent film producer by staging a cross-country run from Syracuse to Hollywood. The film received screenings on the U.S. film festival circuit and won awards for Best Picture and Best Director at the 2008 New Haven Underground Film Festival. Plan 9 from Syracuse was released in August 2008 on DVD by SRS Cinema.

== The Jaws Obsession & The Book of Quint ==
On the December 8th 2021, Ryan Dacko released the first episode of "The Jaws Obsession" podcast. The podcast focuses on exploring every aspect of the 1975 classic blockbuster "Jaws", both the on-set and in-universe. On May 7, 2022, in episode 20 it was revealed that Ryan had completed the writing on his novel "The Book of Quint" based on the character portrayed on screen by Robert Shaw. On the same episode it was revealed that an Indiegogo campaign was launched. On June 27, Ryan revealed that the campaign grossed $3,000, officially granting a limited run in October of the same year. Later that year, Ryan revealed that 300 books were printed.

On October 3, 2022, in "The Jaws Obsession" Episode 41, titled "Permission Granted!", Ryan revealed that he was granted permission by Benchley IP, LLC to move the novel into publication.

On February 24, 2023, Ryan revealed via Instagram that "The Book of Quint" is represented by William Pettit Literary Agency.

To share with you, prove to you, convince you, or remind you, that JAWS is the greatest movie of all time.

- The Jaws Obsession
