= Madhouse (1990 film) =

1990 film by Tom Ropelewski

- Theatrical release poster
- Directed by: Tom Ropelewski
- Written by: Tom Ropelewski
- Produced by: Leslie Dixon
- Starring: John Larroquette; Kirstie Alley; Alison La Placa; John Diehl; Jessica Lundy; Bradley Gregg; Dennis Miller; Robert Ginty
- Cinematography: Dennis C. Lewiston
- Edited by: Michael Jablow
- Music by: David Newman
- Distributed by: Orion Pictures
- Release date: February 16, 1990 (United States)
- Running time: 90 minutes
- Country: United States
- Language: English
- Budget: $8 million
- Box office: $21 million

Madhouse is a 1990 American black comedy film starring Kirstie Alley and John Larroquette. Written and directed by Tom Ropelewski, it was produced by Leslie Dixon and released by Orion Pictures.

== Plot ==
Stockbroker Mark Bannister and his TV reporter/anchorwoman wife Jessie are a yuppie couple with an idyllic California life. It is interrupted when Mark's cousin Fred, and his pregnant wife Bernice fly in from New Jersey. The first days are chaotic thanks to Bernice's cat Scruffy. Mark gives them $300 to spend in the city, but his alone time with Jessie is interrupted when her gold-digger sister Claudia arrives after a fight with her rich Middle Eastern husband Kaddir, whom she divorces after he cancels her credit cards. Fred and Bernice's visit, meant to last only five days, is extended when Bernice falls on the way to the car. She is instructed by her doctor, Dr. Penix, to stay put until the baby is born.

At a bar, Mark motivates Fred to quit being Bernice's pet. However, Fred takes the message too far and leaves "to find himself." Meanwhile, Mark's next door neighbor and carpenter Dale builds a machine to keep Bernice comfortable in bed all day. Bernice constantly insists on being waited on hand and foot and demands funerals and burials for Scruffy, who dies multiple times but comes back each time. Claudia's son Jonathan also comes to live with them after Kaddir throws him out too. Jessie tries getting Dale to seduce Claudia to get her out of the house. However, Mark and Jessie inadvertently burn down Dale's villa. Since it cannot be rebuilt until the home insurance kicks in, which won't be for three months, Dale and his two teens, delinquent son C.K. and phone-obsessed daughter Katy, move in, and Mark and Jessie are forced to take them in to avoid an arson lawsuit. Meanwhile, Mark helps Jonathan get a job as a mailroom clerk at his office.

Days later, chaos persists, and Mark and Jessie are essentially forced out of their own home. When Mark fails to show up for work, his friend and colleague Wes finds the couple outside living like hippies. Wes motivates Mark to resist a little longer; he is on the verge of closing a deal for his boss, Bob Grindle. At work, Mark gets a box from Bogotá containing cocaine—sent to him but requested by Jonathan. Grindle tells Mark to sell a set of stocks due to a scandal, but Mark forgets to before leaving work with the cocaine. Fred returns, having grown a mustache and acquiring a baby elephant. Police arrive at the house and find Scruffy ODing on cocaine; they destroy the Bannister house during the drug bust, which Jessie's TV station televises. Seeing it, the overstressed Jessie bursts into a mental breakdown on live TV. Pushed to their limit and facing ruin and imminent charges, Mark and Jessie decide to abandon the house to their guests and leave town to start new lives.

The next day, returning to salvage what they can, Mark and Jessie hear a recording from Dr. Penix stating that Bernice was actually never pregnant, and their last shred of sanity dissolves. Enraged, Jessie catapults Bernice from her bed to the backyard and forces her to confess to knowing of this. She then ruins Claudia's expensive clothes to force her out, while Mark terrorizes Dale with an electric saw until he and his kids leave. Lastly, Jessie puts fireworks in Jonathan's cocaine bag, which explodes as he tries to flee in Dale's (loaner) Lotus. Mark and Jessie then threaten to torch their own house to keep their visitors away for good. The police arrive, with Jonathan in tow, and apologize, stating that their only evidence—Scruffy—disappeared, and that they will pay for all damages incurred. Grindle arrives and, believing Mark meant to keep the stocks, declares that he amassed a small fortune when the scandal was found to be false. He offers Mark some of the profit and a promotion. Claudia takes the opportunity to seduce Grindle, and Dale flirts with one of the officers, much to C.K's chagrin. Scruffy returns from the police-station evidence room, but is determined to stay with Mark and Jessie. Bernice and Fred depart, with Fred taking more control than before. Jessie and Mark are about to get cozy, but first Mark smashes their ever-malfunctioning toilet with a sledgehammer.

Jessie's furious on-air outburst earns her her own TV show, and she and Mark move into a three-bedroom house in Malibu and live happily ever after, until their parents came to visit.

== Cast ==
- John Larroquette as Mark Bannister
- Kirstie Alley as Jessie Bannister
- Alison La Placa as Claudia, Jessie's sister
- John Diehl as Fred Bannister, Mark's cousin
- Jessica Lundy as Bernice Bannister, Fred's wife
- Bradley Gregg as Jonathan, Claudia's son
- Dennis Miller as Wes, Mark's colleague
- Robert Ginty as Dale, the Bannister's neighbor
- Wayne Tippit as Bob Grindle, Mark's boss
- Paul Eiding as Stark
- Michael Zand as the voice of Kaddir, Claudia's husband
- Aeryk Egan as C.K., Dale's son
- Deborah Otto as Katy

== Production ==
The film was written and directed by Tom Ropelewski, and produced by Leslie Dixon. The cinematographer was Denis Lewiston.

== Reception ==
On Rotten Tomatoes, the film has a score of 0% based on reviews from 6 critics. Roger Ebert gave it 2 out of 4 stars. The Los Angeles Times gave it a negative review and People magazine did as well.

In 2025, IndieWire film historian Jim Hemphill had a vastly differing opinion on Madhouse, comparing it to the films of director Preston Sturges and saying, "The irony is that not only is “Madhouse” not bad, it’s great. And not only great, but all-time great, a comedy so flawless in its construction and so precise in its timing that it ranks alongside the best work of Howard Hawks, Blake Edwards, or any other master of screwball farce you can name."
