= That Old Feeling (film) =

- Theatrical release poster
- Directed by: Carl Reiner
- Written by: Leslie Dixon
- Produced by: Tom Joyner; Bonnie Bruckheimer; Leslie Dixon
- Starring: Bette Midler; Dennis Farina; Paula Marshall; Gail O'Grady; David Rasche; Danny Nucci
- Cinematography: Steve Mason
- Edited by: Richard Halsey
- Music by: Patrick Williams
- Production company: The Bubble Factory
- Distributed by: Universal Pictures
- Release date: April 4, 1997
- Running time: 105 minutes
- Country: United States
- Language: English
- Budget: $35 million
- Box office: $16.6 million

That Old Feeling is a 1997 American romantic comedy film directed by Carl Reiner, his final film as director before his death in 2020. It stars Bette Midler and Dennis Farina.

== Plot ==
Molly de Mora invites her divorced parents to her wedding, where they see each other for the first time in 14 years. During the reception a shouting match between the two ensues. Following this, their spark is rekindled. Over the next few days they fall in love again and run off together, thereby upsetting the newlyweds' honeymoon and their respective (current) spouses. If the scandal was made public it would be more controversial than usual, since the bride's husband hopes to stand for election to Congress. After searching for her parents and getting to know Joey Donna, her mother's number one paparazzi nicknamed "The Cockroach", whom she hires to help her find them, Molly decides that her parents deserve a chance to be together and gives them her honeymoon to Hawaii. When Keith objects to her decision, it is revealed that he slept with her stepmother. Knowing now that her marriage was a mistake, Molly runs off with Joey as her parents run off to Hawaii.

== Cast ==
- Bette Midler as Lilly Leonard
- Dennis Farina as Dan de Mora
- Paula Marshall as Molly de Mora
- Gail O'Grady as Rowena
- David Rasche as Alan
- James Denton as Keith Marks
- Danny Nucci as Joey Donna
- Blu Mankuma as Piano Player
- Jayne Eastwood as Aunt Iris
- Michael J. Reynolds as Senator Marks
- Joan Luchak as Senator Marks' Wife
- Lula Franklin as Granny Tapper
- Mike Wilmot as Man at Wedding
- George Hevenor as Bandleader
- Arlene Meadows as Inn Proprietress
- Don Allison as Desk Clerk
- Ian D. Clark as Rufus
- David Huband as Cop
- Tony Craig as Cop
- Kim Bourne as Waitress
- Cara Chisholm as Waitress

== Production ==
It was written by Leslie Dixon, who also wrote Bette Midler's 1987 film Outrageous Fortune. Dixon came up with the idea for That Old Feeling in the early 1990s, after watching her own divorced parents act friendly to each other. She specifically had Midler in mind, who liked the original spec script, but was locked into an exclusive contract with Disney at the time. Because of this, Dixon had to wait several years for Midler to become available before she could proceed with the project. When Dennis Farina got cast as Midler's husband, she rewrote his character as a crime novelist, in order to accommodate his gruff persona.

Paula Marshall and Danny Nucci, whose characters hook up at the end of the film, both ended up divorcing their spouses in 1998, and married each other in October 2003.

== Release ==
The film was released by Universal Pictures and opened at No. 4 at the North American box office during April 1997, making $5.1 million USD in its opening weekend. It was one of the last films to feature Universal's 1990 opening logo, with a new logo debuting in May 1997 for the release of The Lost World: Jurassic Park. This logo would continue to be used until 2012, and it replaces the 1990 logo on some later prints of That Old Feeling.

== Reception ==
That Old Feeling met with mixed reviews from critics, with a 43% rating on Rotten Tomatoes based on 14 reviews.

Lawrence Van Gelder gave the film a positive review in The New York Times, calling it a "raucous, high-spirited romantic comedy, which zips along under the direction of Carl Reiner, working from a script by the sharp-witted Leslie Dixon." Los Angeles Times critic John Anderson stated that it was a "very traditional comedy in a surreal sort of way" and "generally fun, thanks to old pros Midler and Farina, and Nucci, who plays Joey as a combination Joe Pesci-Jerry Lewis." Chris Hicks of Deseret News labelled it an "anti-family values comedy", and claimed "the film never quite lives up to its first feisty 15 or 20 minutes." The Chicago Tribune's Mark Caro criticized the film, writing, "Instead of focusing on how this couple re-explores their relationship after 14 years of estrangement, the movie scatters its attentions among a group of mostly unpleasant characters. Marshall projects a good-humored sweetness as Molly, but Denton's Keith is a stuffed shirt from the start, which is explained by the easy joke that he's a Republican. Lilly's husband, Alan (David Rasche), is a spineless New Agey therapist, and Dan's wife, Rowena, is a plastic surgery-enhanced shrew portrayed by former NYPD Blue bombshell Gail O'Grady, who's too young to be playing such a gross caricature."

It was subsequently released to VHS on October 7, 1997, and then to DVD on April 28, 1998. In January 1998, Siskel and Ebert included That Old Feeling on their "Worst Films of 1997" episode.
