= Loverboy (1989 film) =

1989 film by Joan Micklin Silver

- Theatrical release poster
- Directed by: Joan Micklin Silver
- Screenplay by: Robin Schiff; Tom Ropelewski; Leslie Dixon
- Story by: Robin Schiff
- Produced by: Gary Foster; Willie Hunt
- Starring: Patrick Dempsey; Kate Jackson; Carrie Fisher; Robert Ginty; Barbara Carrera; Kirstie Alley
- Cinematography: John Hora
- Edited by: Rick Shaine
- Music by: Michel Colombier
- Production company: Crescent Film Enterprises
- Distributed by: Tri-Star Pictures
- Release date: April 28, 1989
- Running time: 98 minutes
- Country: United States
- Language: English
- Budget: $8.5 million
- Box office: $3.8 million (US)

Loverboy is a 1989 American comedy film starring Patrick Dempsey, Kirstie Alley, Carrie Fisher, Kate Jackson, and Barbara Carrera. The film follows a down-on-his-luck college student who gets a job as a pizza delivery man and discovers he can make extra money by offering his personal services to dissatisfied housewives.

The animated opening credits sequence was designed by Sally Cruikshank.

== Plot ==
Randy Bodek is a rebellious college slacker, living with his girlfriend Jenny Gordon. His father, furious over Randy's lack of direction or work ethic, forces Randy to come back home and get a job. Randy eventually finds work as a pizza delivery driver at Señor Pizza, but his pitiful earnings will not allow him to fund college on his own and he despairs of being able to return to Jenny next semester. In his capacity as delivery driver, he soon makes the acquaintance of a middle-aged, wealthy Italian woman, Alex Barnett, who pampers and seduces him. She and Randy enjoy a quiet, brief, passionate affair. During the affair, Randy's increasingly stylish appearance, unusually chipper demeanor and gifts being delivered by Randy's handsome Italian co-worker, Tony (signed "Love, Alex"), inspires Randy's father to believe his son is gay.

Eventually, Alex must return to Italy. Randy is disappointed; he has enjoyed his relationship with Alex, both for the lavish gifts of money and expensive clothing, and for the experience at pleasing women he can bring to his relationship with Jenny upon returning to college. Alex tells him on their last night together that the next time Señor Pizza receives a delivery order for pizza with extra anchovies, it will be her summoning him again.

However, the next order for extra anchovies comes from an unhappily married Asian woman, Kyoko Bruckner. Further orders come from Dr. Joyce Palmer, director of a women's health practice, and isolated aspiring photographer Monica Delancy. Randy's relationships with these women lead him to better understand women's wants and needs.

Through Kyoko and Monica's acquaintances, and the women Joyce recommends to Randy among her patients, Randy soon has a thriving escort business based around the "extra anchovies" order, which he manages to conceal from Señor Pizza's management. Eventually, the three women's husbands become suspicious. In an attempt to pin down who is having sex with their wives, the three husbands go through their wives' financial statements and credit card bills, leading them to Señor Pizza to confront the delivery boy who is apparently having sexual relations with all three of their wives.

Meanwhile, Jenny has come to town to surprise Randy, and has learned from Jory Talbot, a rival of Randy's, that Randy is seeing other women without her knowledge. Randy is not there, having received an order for extra anchovies—from his mother(who believes her husband is having an affair with his secretary, Linda). He escapes the situation before she sees him, and passes the pizza off to Tony, with instructions that they are out of anchovies. Tony attempts to fill in for Randy, and becomes infatuated with Diane who flees upon having second thoughts. Randy then learns from his other co-worker Sal about Jenny's visit and Jory having told her about the other women. Randy and Jory go out back of Señor Pizza to fight, but the husbands arrive, intent on assaulting Randy. They grab Randy and are about to rough him up when Harry (Kyoko's husband) realizes that Randy is Joe Bodek's son, as he and Joe are co-workers; Joe had told Harry during a semi-drunken conversation that he believes Randy to be gay, and Harry dismisses him as a suspect on those grounds. The husbands then assault an unsuspecting Jory.

Randy confesses to Jenny about the reasons he agreed to become a paid escort. Jenny is hurt and uncertain she wants to continue their relationship, but agrees to accompany him to his parents' anniversary party. The husbands follow Jory to the party, where the party dissolves into melee, resulting in their arrest for assault. Tony who had followed Diane to the party, gets caught up in the fight and becomes infatuated with Linda, the secretary. Jory is humiliated when he discovers that his own mother was one of Randy's customers. Joe forgives Randy and agrees to fund college again and Randy finally introduces Jenny to his parents. In the post credits scene, Monica and Diane both bailed their husbands out of jail and reconciled with them, while Kyoko decides to leave Harry in jail.

== Cast ==
- Patrick Dempsey as Randy Bodek
- Kate Jackson as Diane Bodek
- Carrie Fisher as Monica Delancy
- Barbara Carrera as Alex Barnett
- Kirstie Alley as Dr. Joyce Palmer
- Nancy Valen as Jenny Gordon
- Robert Ginty as Joe Bodek
- Vic Tayback as Harry Bruckner
- Robert Picardo as Dr. Reed Palmer
- Ray Girardin as Henry
- E. G. Daily as Linda
- Peter Koch as Claude Delancy
- Robert Camilletti as Tony
- Bernie Coulson as Sal
- Dylan Walsh as Jory Talbot
- Kim Miyori as Kyoko Bruckner

== Reception ==
Loverboy received mixed reviews from critics, as it holds a 50% rating on Rotten Tomatoes from 10 reviews.

Sheila Benson of the Los Angeles Times gave a negative review, criticizing its script and its use of physical farce. Benson opined that the film Some Girls makes for a better showcase of Dempsey's talents.

Time Out said, "This is very silly stuff, but mildly engaging none the less. Silver adeptly juggles the set pieces, orchestrating a frantic, slapstick climax; and the likeable Dempsey is supported by a dependable cast, including Kirstie Alley as a vengeful doctor and Carrie Fisher as a body-builder's cynical wife."

David Nusair of Reel Film Reviews wrote, "The movie, which generally unfolds exactly as one might've anticipated, boasts a bubbly, 1980s-centric feel that tends to compensate for its less-than-appealing elements (eg the undercurrent of gay panic), while Silver does a decent job of exploiting the inherently over-the-top nature of the admittedly ludicrous premise".
