= Breaking the Rules (film) =

- Directed by: Neal Israel
- Written by: Paul W. Shapiro
- Produced by: Kent Bateman; Jonathan D. Krane
- Starring: C. Thomas Howell; Jason Bateman; Jonathan Silverman; Annie Potts
- Cinematography: James Hayman
- Edited by: Tom Walls
- Music by: David Kitay
- Production company: MCEG
- Distributed by: Miramax Films
- Release date: October 9, 1992
- Running time: 100 minutes
- Country: United States
- Language: English
- Budget: $5 million
- Box office: $52,285

Breaking the Rules (also known as Sketches) is a 1992 American comedy-drama film directed by Neal Israel. The film stars C. Thomas Howell, Jason Bateman, Jonathan Silverman and Annie Potts.

== Plot ==
Phil (Jason Bateman) is a cancer-stricken man who tricks his two best friends, Gene (C. Thomas Howell) and Rob (Jonathan Silverman), whom he hasn't seen in a long time, to go on a road trip, by inviting them to a fake engagement party. This has the potential for problems because Gene once stole Rob's girlfriend. Phil gets them to be friends again. He tells them of his illness and all three decide to go to Los Angeles for Phil's dying wish: to be a contestant on Jeopardy! On the way there they meet an attractive wild woman with a heart of gold (Annie Potts).

== Cast ==
- C. Thomas Howell as Gene Michaels
  - Jackey Vinson as young Gene Michaels
- Jason Bateman as Phil Stepler
  - Shawn Phelan as young Phil Stepler
- Jonathan Silverman as Rob Konigsberg
  - Marty Belafsky as young Rob Konigsberg
- Annie Potts as Mary Klinglitch
- Kent Bateman as Mr. Stepler
- Krista Tesreau as Rob's Date
- Frank Welker as Special Vocal Effects
- Paul Cobb as distressed and snappily dressed funeral attendee
- Angelbertha Cobb as the mourning widow funeral attendee

== Reception ==
Roger Ebert savaged the film in his contemporary review, damning its inauthentic script wherein "one appalling scene follows another". In an exasperated tone, he asked: "Was there no one to cry out, Stop this madness? No one to read the script and see that it was without sense or sensibility? No one to listen to the dialogue and observe that nobody in the world ever talked like this?"
