= The Next Best Thing =

2000 American film by John Schlesinger

- Theatrical release poster
- Directed by: John Schlesinger
- Written by: Tom Ropelewski
- Produced by: Tom Rosenberg; Leslie Dixon; Linne Radmin
- Starring: Rupert Everett; Madonna; Benjamin Bratt; Michael Vartan; Josef Sommer; Lynn Redgrave
- Cinematography: Elliot Davis
- Edited by: Peter Honess
- Music by: Gabriel Yared
- Production company: Lakeshore Entertainment
- Distributed by: Paramount Pictures
- Release date: March 3, 2000
- Running time: 108 minutes
- Country: United States
- Language: English
- Budget: $25 million
- Box office: $24.3 million

The Next Best Thing is a 2000 American comedy drama film directed by John Schlesinger and starring Madonna, Rupert Everett and Benjamin Bratt. It follows a woman who has a one-night stand with her gay best friend, which results in her giving birth to a son that the two attempt to co-parent over the ensuing years amidst a custody battle. It features supporting performances from Michael Vartan, Josef Sommer, Lynn Redgrave, Neil Patrick Harris, and Illeana Douglas. It was Schlesinger's final feature film before his death in 2003.

The Next Best Thing was released by Paramount Pictures on March 3, 2000. The film was a box-office bomb as it grossed $24.3 million against a $25 million budget and received overwhelmingly negative reviews from film critics, with the screenplay and performances receiving criticism. The accompanying soundtrack album was appreciated by music critics. Its lead single, "American Pie", topped the charts in various countries, including Everett's native United Kingdom, where Madonna extended her record as the female artist with most number-one songs in the country.

== Plot ==
Abbie, a heterosexual woman, and Robert, a gay man, are best friends living in California. In 1992, when Abbie is dumped by her boyfriend Kevin, she and Robert get drunk and have a one-night stand. Abbie discovers she is pregnant shortly thereafter. Abbie tells Robert, and asks him if he wants to be the baby's father. Robert is adamant about being the father in all its responsibilities.

Five years later, Robert and Abbie have moved in together following their son Sam's birth. They sleep in separate bedrooms, and build a happy life together as Sam's parents. They struggle over how much to reveal to Sam about the nature of their relationship beyond simply being his mother and father, including how to tell Sam that Robert is gay.

Abbie and Robert both struggle with being single, with Robert finding his priority is Sam's well-being. Robert encourages Abbie to date, and she meets Ben, a successful accountant. Eventually, Ben proposes to Abbie and she accepts. Robert is apprehensive, worrying that Ben will replace him as Sam's father, but the three learn to function as a happy family. Things come to a crossroads, however, when Ben receives an important work promotion requiring him to move to New York. Abbie wants to move with Ben, but is worried about how it will affect the parental arrangement with Robert and Sam. Robert is furious, despite Abbie and Ben's attempts to figure out a solution with him.

Following an argument, Robert returns home to find that Abbie and Sam have moved out of their home to stay with Ben. Robert explores his legal options, filing for joint custody, prompting Abbie to admit to him that she learned 3 years ago from a blood test that Sam cannot be Robert's biological son due to them both being O- and Sam being B+: she had a one-night stand with Kevin following their breakup and Kevin is the only possible biological father. Robert is livid that she kept this from him. Abbie insists that, despite knowing Kevin could have been the father, she wanted Robert to be the father. But, she threatens that if Robert takes her to court, she will reveal the truth to keep Sam with her and defend her life with Ben.

Knowing the odds are against him, especially as a gay man, Robert seeks joint custody. During the court proceedings, Abbie's lawyer attempts to cast Robert as a drug abuser and sexual deviant, which Abbie abhors, but allows. Despite his defense of his character, and insistence on his presence in Sam's life for the past 6 years as his father, the court merely refers to him as a "caregiver" and allows him a single visitation in the meantime. Desperate, Robert reaches out to Kevin, informing him that he is the real biological father, in hopes that Kevin will seek custody and allow Robert to stay in Sam's life. Kevin is reluctant, but surprises everyone involved when he arrives with his lawyer seeking custody so he can see if he wants to be a father to Sam, with no desire to involve Robert in Sam's life. The judge rules that the case be suspended for four months to allow a custodial investigation, during which time, Abbie will have sole custody but will not be allowed to leave the city with Sam. Abbie is furious that Robert contacted Kevin and how it will affect Sam. Robert is remorseful.

Robert goes to Sam's school to see him, but finds Ben there waiting while Abbie is inside with Sam. Ben tries to reconcile with Robert, revealing that he left the company, and therefore does not need to move to New York anymore. Abbie is still angry and refuses to let Sam go to Robert. As they drive away, Abbie sees how despondent Sam is and stops the car. She approaches Robert and apologizes for her part in the situation, and the two admit that they miss each other. She lets Sam go to Robert and tells them to come back after dinner, hinting at the potential for harmony again as a family.

== Cast ==
- Madonna as Abigail "Abbie" Reynolds
- Rupert Everett as Robert Whittaker
- Benjamin Bratt as Benjamin "Ben" Cooper
- Michael Vartan as Kevin Lasater
- Josef Sommer as Richard Whittaker
- Lynn Redgrave as Helen Whittaker
- Malcolm Stumpf as Samuel "Sam" Whittaker
- Neil Patrick Harris as David
- Illeana Douglas as Caroline Ryder, Robert's lawyer
- John Carroll Lynch as Abbie's lawyer
- Mark Valley as Cardiologist
- Suzanne Krull as Annabel
- Stacy Edwards as Finn
- William Mesnik as Ashby
- Linda Larkin as Kelly
- Adam Marlow as Baby
- Kimberley Davies as Hostess

== Production ==
The film began as an original screenplay titled The Red Curtain by Tom Ropelewski, which he intended to direct, with his wife Leslie Dixon to produce. It was announced to be made in 1995 with Richard Dreyfuss attached to star as Robert, however, he dropped out. Helen Hunt was named as the female lead to play Abbie, though she was replaced by Madonna. Rupert Everett signed on to star shortly after Madonna. Filming took place between April 23 and June 30, 1999. It later was claimed the script was rewritten extensively by Ryan Murphy and Rupert Everett.

== Release ==
Paramount Pictures distributed the film in North America while international sales were held by Lakeshore International. Buena Vista International acquired distribution rights from Lakeshore in most territories.

=== Home media ===
On August 26, 2000, Billboard announced the film would debut on DVD and VHS from Paramount Home Entertainment, although spokespeople would not confirm it. The release debuted at number 20 on Billboard's Top DVD Sales, and peaked at number 11 on the Top Video Rentals chart. The Philadelphia Inquirer gave two out of four stars.

== Reception ==
=== Critical response ===
On the review aggregator website Rotten Tomatoes, 19% of 94 critics' reviews are positive, with an average rating of 3.8/10. The website's consensus reads: "Story elements clash and acting falls short." Metacritic, which uses a weighted average, assigned the film a score of 25 out of 100, based on 31 critics, indicating "generally unfavorable" reviews. Audiences polled by CinemaScore gave the film an average grade of "B−" on an A+ to F scale.

Variety commented: "The Next Best Thing to a good movie is a well-intentioned one, and at the end of the day, that less-than-compelling consolation prize is about the best thing one can hand this resoundingly adequate Advanced Family Values comedy-drama". Roger Ebert gave the film one star out of four, stating: "The Next Best Thing is a garage sale of gay issues, harnessed to a plot as exhausted as a junkman's horse."

Stephen Holden of The New York Times wrote of the film: "In its early scenes The Next Best Thing shows promise as a sophisticated screwball comedy about romantic love, parenthood and sexual orientation in contemporary Los Angeles. But about halfway through, the story takes a disastrous turn and heads away from comedy into the land of suds and sorrow. Any psychological credibility the movie has built up is quickly dissipated, as it turns into a stumbling, poor man's Kramer vs. Kramer."

=== Box office ===
The film opened at number two at the North American box office, making US$5,870,387, behind The Whole Nine Yards. The film grossed $14,990,582 in the U.S. and $24,362,772 worldwide on a $25 million budget.

=== Awards ===
Award	Category	Recipient	Result
YoungStar Award	Best Young Actor in a Comedy Film	Malcolm Stumpf	Nominated
GLAAD Media Award	Outstanding Film – Wide Release	The Next Best Thing	Nominated
Golden Raspberry Awards	Worst Picture	The Next Best Thing	Nominated
Golden Raspberry Awards	Worst Screenplay	John Kohn and Robert Bentley	Nominated
Golden Raspberry Awards	Worst Actress	Madonna	Won
Golden Raspberry Awards	Worst Screen Combo	Madonna and Rupert Everett	Nominated
Golden Raspberry Awards	Worst Director	John Schlesinger	Nominated
Stinkers Bad Movie Awards	Worst Actress and Musician or Athlete Who Shouldn't Be Acting	Madonna	Won

CNN film critic, Paul Clinton, named The Next Best Thing one of the top 10 worst movies of 2000. In 2020, Screen Rant ranked Madonna's performance among her best movie roles.

== See also ==
- List of LGBTQ-related films by storyline
