= Thomas Del Ruth =

American film director

Thomas Del Ruth ASC
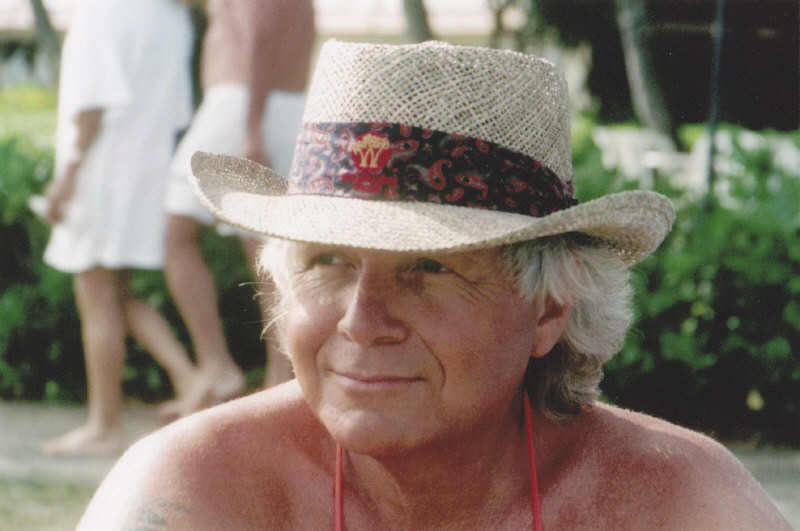
- Del Ruth in 2004
- Born: May 1, 1942 (age 84); Beverly Hills, California, U.S.
- Years active: 1964–2010
- Spouse: Patricia West-Del Ruth
- Parents: Roy Del Ruth; Winnie Lightner

Thomas Del Ruth ASC (born May 1, 1942) is a retired American cinematographer.

== Early life ==
Del Ruth was born in 1942 in Beverly Hills, California, as the son of film director Roy Del Ruth, {Star on Hollywood Blvd} and Singer and Musical star Winnie Lightner.

He was educated at Van Nuys High School and the University of Southern California and began working in the Motion Picture business as a Messenger at WB in 1959 and again at Disney Studios in 1965,{after serving in the US Army (1961-1965). Del Ruth was selected for the Disney Management program and through the program, becoming a second assistant director. Del Ruth was a Member of SAG and performed as a commercial actor and print model until his desired transition to the Camera Dept. in 1967.

== Career ==
Del Ruth switched from being in front of the camera to being behind it in 1967 and was promoted to director of photography in 1979 by Universal Studios.

He has received two Emmy Awards for outstanding cinematography as well as six additional Emmy nominations. In addition, he has won four American Society of Cinematographers Outstanding Cinematography Awards as well as an additional seven ASC nominations.

Del Ruth is a member of the American Society of Cinematographers (ASC), as well as the Academy of Motion Picture Arts and Sciences.

He has experience as assistant director, producer and director.

== Filmography ==
=== Film ===
Year	Title	Director
1980	Motel Hell	Kevin Connor
1981	Underground Aces	Robert Butler
1982	Death Wish II (Note: Shared credit with Richard H. Kline)	Michael Winner
1983	Hysterical	Chris Bearde
1983	Get Crazy	Allan Arkush
1984	Impulse	Graham Baker
1985	Fandango	Kevin Reynols
1985	The Breakfast Club	John Hughes
1986	Quicksilver	Thomas Michael Donnelly
1986	Stand by Me	Rob Reiner
1987	Cross My Heart	Armyan Bernstein
1987	The Running Man	Paul Michael Glaser
1988	Satisfaction	Joan Freeman
1989	Look Who's Talking	Amy Heckerling
1990	Look Who's Talking Too	Amy Heckerling
1992	Kuffs	Bruce A. Evans
1992	Little Sister	Jimmy Zeilinger
1992	The Mighty Ducks	Stephen Herek
1993	Amore!	Lorenzo Doumani
1997	Leave It to Beaver	Andy Cadiff
1998	Kissing a Fool	Doug Ellin
2010	Flipped	Rob Reiner

=== Television ===
Year	Title	Director	Notes
1973-1974	ABC's Wide World of Sports		6 episodes
1976	The Olympiad	Bud Greenspan	2 episodes
1979	Mrs. Columbo	Don Medford; Edward M. Abroms; Sam Wanamaker	4 episodes
1979	The Last Convertible	Gus Trikonis	Part 3
1981	The Wonderful World of Phillip Malley	Harry Falk	Pilot
1981–1983	Simon & Simon	Corey Allen	3 episodes
1986	Outlaws	Peter Werner	Pilot episode
1987	Spies		
1989-1990	Wolf		11 episodes; Also credited as producer
1993	The X-Files	Robert Mandel	Episode "Pilot"
1994	ER	Rod Holcomb; Mimi Leder; Mark Tinker	3 episodes (Including "24 Hours")
1995	Courthouse	Ron Lagomarsino	Episode "Pilot"
1995-1996	JAG		7 episodes; Also directed episode "Sightings"
1998	Charmed		7 episodes
1999-2004	The West Wing		96 episodes
2006	The Book of Daniel	James Frawley	Episode "Temptation"
2006-2007	Studio 60 on the Sunset Strip		14 episodes
2007-2008	Moonlight	Rod Holcomb	Episode "No Such Thing as Vampires"

TV movies

Year	Title	Director	Notes
1979	She's Dressed to Kill	Gus Trikonis	
1980	Mark, I Love You	Gunnar Hellström	
1981	This House Possessed	William Wiard	
1981	Elvis and the Beauty Queen	Gus Trikonis	
1982	Help Wanted: Male	William Wiard	
1982	Million Dollar Infield	Hal Cooper	
1982	Paper Dolls	Edward Zwick	
1982	In Love with an Older Woman	Jack Bender	
1983	Who Will Love My Children?	John Erman	
1983	Intimate Agony	Paul Wendkos	
1984	Best Kept Secrets	Jerrold Freedman	
1986	Blind Justice	Rod Holcomb	
1986	Who Is Julia?	Walter Grauman	
1988	Ladykillers	Robert Michael Lewis	
1989	Dream Breakers	Stuart Millar	
1992	T Bone N Weasel	Lewis Teague	
1993	Barbarians at the Gate	Glenn Jordan	With Nicholas D. Knowland
1993	Donato and Daughter	Rod Holcomb	
1993	House of Secrets	Mimi Leder	
1994	Shattered Image	Fritz Kiersch	
1994	Royce	Rod Holcomb	
1994	Next Door	Tony Bill	
1994	One Christmas	Tony Bill	With Donald M. Morgan
1995	My Brother's Keeper	Glenn Jordan	
1995	Abandoned and Deceived	Joseph Dougherty	
1996	Chasing the Dragon	Ian Sander	
1996	Full Circle	Bethany Rooney	
1997	Asteroid	Bradford May	With David Hennings
1997	When the Cradle Falls	Paul Schneider	
1997	The Underworld	Rod Holcomb	
1999	Down Will Come Baby	Gregory Goodell	
1999	It Came from the Sky	Jack Bender	
2005	Heartless	Robert Markowitz	
2005	Code Breakers	Rod Holcomb	

== Awards and nominations ==
American Society of Cinematographers

Year	Category	Title	Result	Ref.
1994	Outstanding Achievement in Cinematography in Movies of the Week/Pilots	The X-Files	Nominated	
1995	Outstanding Achievement in Cinematography in Movies of the Week/Pilots	ER	Won	
1999	Outstanding Achievement in Cinematography in Movies of the Week/Pilots	The West Wing	Won	
2005	Outstanding Achievement in Cinematography in Movies of the Week/Pilots	Code Breakers	Nominated	
2006	Outstanding Achievement in Cinematography in Movies of the Week/Pilots	Studio 60 on the Sunset Strip	Nominated	
1995	Outstanding Achievement in Cinematography in Regular Series	ER	Won	
1999	Outstanding Achievement in Cinematography in Regular Series	The West Wing	Won	
2000	Outstanding Achievement in Cinematography in Regular Series	The West Wing	Won	
2001	Outstanding Achievement in Cinematography in Regular Series	The West Wing	Won	
2002	Outstanding Achievement in Cinematography in Regular Series	The West Wing	Nominated	
2003	Outstanding Achievement in Cinematography in Regular Series	The West Wing	Nominated	

Primetime Emmy Awards

Year	Category	Title	Result
1995	Outstanding Individual Achievement in Cinematography for a Miniseries or a Special	My Brother's Keeper	Nominated
2000	Outstanding Cinematography for a Single Camera Series	The West Wing	Won
2001	Outstanding Cinematography for a Single Camera Series	The West Wing	Won
2002	Outstanding Cinematography for a Single Camera Series	The West Wing	Nominated
2003	Outstanding Cinematography for a Single Camera Series	The West Wing	Nominated
2004	Outstanding Cinematography for a Single Camera Series	The West Wing	Nominated
2007	Outstanding Cinematography for a Single Camera Series	Studio 60 on the Sunset Strip	Nominated
