= Outrageous Fortune (film) =

1987 film by Arthur Hiller

- Theatrical release poster
- Directed by: Arthur Hiller
- Written by: Leslie Dixon
- Produced by: Ted Field; Robert W. Cort
- Starring: Shelley Long; Bette Midler; Peter Coyote; Robert Prosky; George Carlin
- Cinematography: David M. Walsh
- Edited by: Tom Rolf
- Music by: Alan Silvestri
- Production companies: Touchstone Pictures; Silver Screen Partners II; Interscope Communications
- Distributed by: Buena Vista Distribution Co.
- Release date: January 30, 1987
- Running time: 99 minutes
- Country: United States
- Language: English
- Box office: $52.9 million

Outrageous Fortune is a 1987 American comedy film written by Leslie Dixon, directed by Arthur Hiller and starring Shelley Long and Bette Midler. The title is taken from Shakespeare's Hamlet ("...the slings and arrows of outrageous fortune..."). It is the tenth film of Touchstone Pictures.

The film was successful at the box office, and Midler was nominated for the Golden Globe Award for Best Actress – Motion Picture Musical or Comedy, and won an American Comedy Award for Funniest Actress in a Motion Picture (Leading Role).

== Plot ==
"When two actresses discover that their mutual boyfriend isn't all he seems to be, they take off on a cross-country chase to track him down."

Refined but struggling actress Lauren Ames finally has a chance to study with the great theatre professor Stanislav Korzenowski. Sandy Brozinsky, a brash, loud actress, decides through happenstance to also study with Korzenowski. Lauren and Sandy take an instant dislike to each other when they first meet in Korzenowski's class, but unknown to each other, both women begin dating the same man, Michael Santers.

When Michael "dies" in a gas explosion at a local store, Lauren and Sandy figure out that Michael may have faked his death, and they form an uneasy alliance to follow leads across the country to Albuquerque, to find him, and force him to choose between them. During their quest, Lauren and Sandy are chased by CIA agents, as well as Russian assassins who are also after Michael.

When Lauren and Sandy finally find Michael, he tries to kill both of them and they are forced to run until they are captured by the federal agents. Lauren and Sandy learn that Michael is a double agent for the CIA who has now gone rogue, also working for the KGB, and that he has stolen a toxin that could destroy huge areas of nature with just a few drops. The CIA wants to find Michael to force him to give back the toxin bio-weapon, while the Russian assassins are men cheated by the double agent who works for Korzenowski, their theatre professor.

The chase leads to rural New Mexico when Lauren is taken hostage by Michael and his rogue associates who force a trade with the CIA for the toxin, and with Korzenowski with the stolen cash he intended to give to Michael. When the trade goes awry, Lauren gets away with both the money and the toxin, with Michael in hot pursuit. Cornered on a series of mountain tops, Lauren uses her former ballet skills to evade him, culminating in a grand jeté, as pursuing Michael slips and is presumably killed on the rocks far below while the money is lost to Native Americans. The women form a lasting friendship, and go on to perform Hamlet together, with Lauren in the title role and Sandy as Ophelia.

== Cast ==
- Shelley Long as Lauren Ames
- Bette Midler as Sandy Brozinsky
- Peter Coyote as Michael Santers
- Robert Prosky as Stanislav Korzenowski
- George Carlin as Frank Madras
- John Schuck as Agent Atkins
- Anthony Heald as Agent Weldon
- Christopher McDonald as George

== Production ==
Shelley Long was the first to sign, with her contract guaranteed top billing, but before Midler would sign, Long had to agree to share top billing. During production, Midler's and Long's names were alternated on press releases sent out. When Midler's name appeared first in a release, the next press document sent out had to mention Long's first. Midler received top billing on release prints east of the Mississippi River. Long received top billing on release prints west of the Mississippi River. Once the film was in theaters, the distributor sent two sets of newspaper advertisements. One set had Midler's name on the left and Long's name on the right, the other set had Long's name on the left and Midler's name on the right. The newspaper ads alternated on a daily basis. Two sets of movie trailers, posters, and lobby cards were required.

This agreement extended through the original LaserDisc and VHS release of the title, with discs shipped to retailers in the west featuring Shelley Long and retailers on the east receiving discs featuring Bette Midler.

On an episode of Oprah, Midler remarked that working with Long was "rough," echoing similar sentiments amongst Long's bosses on her hit TV series Cheers.

Suzanne Somers has said that Michael Eisner offered her a three-movie deal with Disney which included Outrageous Fortune, but she turned it down. She would have played Bette Midler's part.

== Locations ==
- New York City, New York, United States

- a tobacconist shop in Midtown Manhattan
- a tenement building in Alphabet City, Lower East Side

- Newark, New Jersey, United States

- Newark Airport

- near Santa Fe, New Mexico, United States

- Los Cerrillos, New Mexico, United States
- Laguna Pueblo, New Mexico, United States
- Isleta, New Mexico, United States
- Abiquiu Formation, near Abiquiú, New Mexico, United States

- Los Angeles, California, United States

- Embassy Hotel as the drama school
- an old brewery as "Sandy's" apartment

- Pyramid Lake, near Castaic, California, United States

- lakefront scenes

== Release ==
Outrageous Fortune was financially successful, debuting at number 2 at the US box office with a gross of $6.4 million in its opening weekend, a record for Disney at the time. It went on to gross $52.9 million in the US and Canada.

By May 1988, Outrageous Fortune was on cable TV.

== Reception ==
The film received mixed reviews from critics. On the review aggregator website Rotten Tomatoes, 58% of 26 critics' reviews are positive, with an average rating of 5.3/10. Metacritic, which uses a weighted average, assigned the film a score of 55 out of 100, based on 18 critics, indicating "mixed or average" reviews. Audiences surveyed by CinemaScore were more positive, giving the film an average grade of "A−" on a scale of A+ to F.

Roger Ebert gave the film 2 stars out of 4, saying that the movie is "painstakingly crafted as a product", and focused on assembling "standard cliches" and expensive stunts rather than exploring the humanity of its characters. Gene Siskel gave it 2½ stars, praising Bette Midler for providing "big laughs" but saying she "is the only reason to watch this uneven comedy." Janet Maslin of The New York Times described the two leads as "hilarious", saying Shelley Long does her role "to perfection" and Bette Midler "has flawless phrasing and timing." She said the film "has a light tone, a steady pace and an enjoyable professionalism that help take the edge off the material's occasional lapses."

For her performance, Midler received a Golden Globe nomination.
