= Baby Talk (TV series) =

American sitcom

- Genre: Sitcom
- Developed by: Ed. Weinberger
- Directed by: John Bowab; Linda Day; John Sgueglin
- Starring: Julia Duffy; George Clooney; William Hickey; Lenny Wolpe; Tom Alan Robbins; Mary Page Keller; Scott Baio; Francesca P. Roberts; Polly Bergen
- Voices of: Tony Danza
- Theme music composer: Jay Turnbow; Larry Parks
- Opening theme: "Bread and Butter"
- Country of origin: United States
- Original language: English
- No. of seasons: 2
- No. of episodes: 35

Production
- Executive producers: Ed. Weinberger; Saul Turteltaub; Bernie Orenstein
- Producers: Patricia Fass Palmer; Dennis Gallegos; Mark J. Greenberg; Maxine Lapiduss
- Cinematography: Daniel Flannery; Dan Kuleto
- Editor: Charlie Bowyer
- Camera setup: Multi-camera
- Running time: 22–24 minutes
- Production company: Columbia Pictures Television

Original release
- Network: ABC
- Release: March 8, 1991 – May 8, 1992

Related
- Look Who's Talking

Baby Talk is an American sitcom that aired on ABC from March 8, 1991 to May 8, 1992, as part of ABC's TGIF lineup. Loosely based on the Look Who's Talking films, the show was developed by Ed. Weinberger and produced by Columbia Pictures Television.

Following negative critical reviews for the series' first season, the cast and crew was almost entirely replaced between seasons, including Mary Page Keller assuming the lead role previously played by Julia Duffy. Prior to the second season beginning, new cast addition Scott Baio said: "I did a show for 11 years (Happy Days) that never ever got a good review. So we hope you guys will love it, but we're just going to do the best we can, and it's what the people like that's going to stay on". The series was cancelled after two seasons.

== Cast and characters ==
=== Season 1 ===
- Julia Duffy as Maggie Campbell
- Ryan & Paul Jessup as Mickey Campbell
- Tony Danza as Mickey Campbell (voice)
- George Clooney as Joe
- William Hickey as Mr. Fogarty
- Lenny Wolpe as Howard
- Tom Alan Robbins as Dr. Elliot Fleisher
- Michelle Ashlee as Nurse Andrea

=== Season 2 ===
- Mary Page Keller as Maggie Campbell
- Ryan & Paul Jessup as Mickey Campbell
- Tony Danza as Mickey Campbell (voice)
- Scott Baio as James Halbrook
- Polly Bergen as Doris Campbell
- Francesca P. Roberts as Anita Craig
- Alicia & Celicia Johnson as Danielle Craig
- Vernee Watson-Johnson as Danielle Craig (voice)
- Jessica Lundy as Susan Davis
- Wayne Collins as Tony Craig

== Episodes ==
=== Series overview ===
Season	Episodes	Originally released	
Season	Episodes	First released	Last released
1	13	March 8, 1991	May 17, 1991
2	22	September 27, 1991	May 8, 1992

=== Season 1 (1991) ===
No. overall	No. in season	Title	Directed by	Written by	Original release date	Prod. code	Viewers (millions)
1	1	"Baby Love"	John Bowab	Alan Kirschenbaum	March 8, 1991	101	29.0
2	2	"Star is Newborn"	John Bowab	Oliver Goldstick & Philip Rosenthal	March 15, 1991	103	24.3
3	3	"Womb with a View"	John Bowab	Deborah Markoe-Klein & Chris R. Westphal	March 22, 1991	104	25.0
4	4	"Trading Places"	John Bowab	Ron Lux & Eugene B. Stein	March 29, 1991	102	22.2
5	5	"Give a Sucker an Even Break"	John Bowab	Maxine Lapiduss	April 1, 1991	106	20.9
6	6	"Whiz Kid"	John Sgueglia	Victor Levin	April 5, 1991	107	22.6
7	7	"One Night with Elliot"	John Rich	Oliver Goldstick & Phil Rosenthal	April 12, 1991	109	19.8
8	8	"The Fever"	John Sgueglia	Alan Kirschenbaum	April 16, 1991	111	17.0
9	9	"The Big One"	John Sgueglia	Maxine Lapiduss, Deborah Markoe-Klein & Chris R. Westphal	April 23, 1991	112	18.1
10	10	"Tooth and Nail"	John Sgueglia	Alan Kirschenbaum, Victor Levin & Michael Rowe	April 30, 1991	108	16.0
11	11	"Once in Love with Cecil"	John Sgueglia	Oliver Goldstick & Phil Rosenthal	May 7, 1991	110	15.6
12	12	"Out of Africa"	John Bowab	Dinah Kirgo	May 17, 1991	105	16.4

=== Season 2 (1991–92) ===
No. overall	No. in season	Title	Directed by	Written by	Original release date	Prod. code	Viewers (millions)
13	1	"Starting Over"	Linda Day	Saul Turteltaub & Bernie Orenstein	September 20, 1991	202	17.0
14	2	"Your Loss is My Gain"	Linda Day	Anne Flett & Chuck Ranberg	September 27, 1991	201	18.2
15	3	"Security"	Linda Day	Jay Abramowitz	October 4, 1991	203	15.8
16	4	"Maggie's Personals' Birthday"	Linda Day	Ron Clark	October 18, 1991	205	14.0
17	5	"Maggie's Left Foot"	Linda Day	Lisa Medway	October 25, 1991	207	18.2
18	6	"I've Got a Secret"	Linda Day	Anne Flett & Chuck Ranberg	November 1, 1991	208	16.1
19	7	"Dr. Duck's Jamboree"	Linda Day	Sheldon Krasner & David Saling	November 8, 1991	206	19.6
20	8	"Teach Your Children"	Linda Day	Anne Flett & Chuck Ranberg	November 15, 1991	204	17.1
21	9	"Cold Turkey"	Linda Day	Ellen Sandler & Cindy Elias	November 22, 1991	210	17.9
22	10	"Jingle Fever"	Linda Day	Sheldon Krasner & David Saling	November 29, 1991	209	12.5
23	11	"Away in a Manager"	Linda Day	Anne Flett & Chuck Ranberg	December 13, 1991	212	16.7
24	12	"The Man Who Would Be Grandpa"	Linda Day	Ellen Sandler & Cindy Elias	January 3, 1992	211	23.6
25	13	"Now I Know How Lassie Feels"	Linda Day	Ron Clark	January 17, 1992	214	18.0
26	14	"Requiem for a Lightweight"	Linda Day	Jay Abramowitz	January 24, 1992	215	21.1
27	15	"Broadway Baby"	Linda Day	Anne Flett & Chuck Ranberg	January 31, 1992	213	19.8
28	16	"The Prince and the Pooper"	Linda Day	Story by : Paul Markoe; Teleplay by : Saul Turteltaub & Bernie Orenstein	February 7, 1992	216	18.2
29	17	"The Commitment"	Linda Day	Gary Goldstein	February 14, 1992	217	16.2
30	18	"Warren Piece"	Linda Day	Sheldon Krasner & David Saling	February 21, 1992	218	16.3
31	19	"The Littlest Shoplifter"	Linda Day	Saul Turteltaub & Bernie Orenstein	February 28, 1992	219	18.7
32	20	"He Ain't Heavy Metal, He's My Super"	Linda Day	Ellen Sandler & Cindy Elias	March 13, 1992	221	18.0
33	21	"Pop Goes the Question"	Linda Day	Anne Flett & Chuck Ranberg	March 27, 1992	220	17.9
34	22	"Wedding Bell Blahs"	Linda Day	Jay Abramowitz & Lisa Medway	April 24, 1992	222	17.6
35	23	"Scenes from a Marriage"	Linda Day	Anne Flett & Chuck Ranberg	May 8, 1992	223	16.7
