= Leslie Dixon =

American screenwriter and film producer

- Born: New York City, New York, U.S.
- Occupations: Screenwriter; producer
- Known for: Limitless; Freaky Friday
- Spouse: Tom Ropelewski
- Children: 1
- Relatives: Dorothea Lange (grandmother); Maynard Dixon (grandfather)

Leslie Dixon (born c. 1954) is an American screenwriter and film producer. She has written or co‑written more than 20 feature films and first gained recognition in Hollywood with the success of the comedy Outrageous Fortune (1987). Her screen credits include Overboard (1987), Look Who's Talking Now (1993), Mrs. Doubtfire (1993), Pay It Forward (2000), Freaky Friday (2003), Hairspray (2007) and the thriller Limitless (2011), which she also produced. She is the granddaughter of painter Maynard Dixon and photographer Dorothea Lange.

== Early life ==
Leslie Dixon is the granddaughter of photographer Dorothea Lange and landscaper painter Maynard Dixon. Dixon grew up in the California Bay Area. At the age of 18, she was living alone in San Francisco without enough money to afford college. Once she realized that she wanted to pursue writing, she moved to Hollywood at the age of 26 with hopes of making her way into the film industry. Having no contacts within the industry, she began by working office jobs for several years and eventually landed a job as a script reader. During her time as a script reader, she studied the scripts she was reading. She learned the structure of scripts, their layout on the page, the elements that were needed in order to make a script appealing and successful, and she recognized the types of scripts that gained the most attention from producers. This gave her insight into "what was and wasn’t being bought". After a year of living in Hollywood, she wrote her first screenplay (written with an unknown co-writer). Her partner got an agent attached to the piece, and after receiving two offers, it was sold to Columbia Pictures for $30,000. However, the screenplay never made it to production.

== Career ==
Her first solo screenplay was Outrageous Fortune (1987), written for Shelley Long and Bette Midler. The idea for the screenplay came at Robert Cort's request for a "female buddy film." From 1987 to 1997, Dixon continued to write romantic comedies, including Overboard (1987), Loverboy (1989), Mrs. Doubtfire (1993), and That Old Feeling (1997). She also wrote an adaptation for The Thomas Crown Affair (1999), a re-write from Alan Trustman's original screenplay in 1968, and then the drama Pay It Forward (2000) based on Catherine Ryan Hyde's 1999 novel of the same name. After reading Alan Glynn's The Dark Fields, she wrote Limitless (2011).

In 2004, Dixon was nominated for a Saturn Award for Best Writing for her Freaky Friday (2003) screenplay.

== Personal life ==
She is married to fellow screenwriter, producer and director Tom Ropelewski. Their son was born January 16, 1996. They reside in Berkeley, California.

== Filmography ==
=== Film ===
Year	Title	Writer	Producer
1987	Outrageous Fortune	Yes	No
1987	Overboard	Yes	No
1989	Loverboy	Yes	Yes
1990	Madhouse	No	Yes
1993	Mrs. Doubtfire	Yes	No
1997	That Old Feeling	Yes	Yes
1999	The Thomas Crown Affair	Yes	No
2000	Pay It Forward	Yes	No
2000	The Next Best Thing	No	Yes
2003	Freaky Friday	Yes	No
2005	Just Like Heaven	Yes	No
2007	Hairspray	Yes	No
2007	The Heartbreak Kid	Yes	No
2011	Limitless	Yes	Yes
2018	Overboard	Yes	No
2027	The Thomas Crown Affair	Yes	No

Executive producer

- Look Who's Talking Now (1993)
- Gone Girl (2014)

=== Television ===
Writer

- The 85th Annual Academy Awards (2016)

Co-executive producer

- Limitless (2015–2016)
