= Tom Alan Robbins =

American actor (born 1954)

- Born: Thomas Alan Robbins; March 29, 1954 (age 72); Canton, Ohio, US
- Education: Juilliard School (BFA)
- Occupation: Actor
- Years active: 1991–present

Thomas Alan Robbins (born March 29, 1954) is an American actor.

== Early life ==
Born on March 29, 1954, in Canton, Ohio, Robbins graduated from Lehman High School. He earned a bachelor's degree from the Juilliard School as a member of Group Six.

== Career ==
Tom has performed in eight Broadway shows, including The Lion King in which he originated the role of Pumbaa. He played Thenardier in the first national tour of Les Misérables. Off-Broadway productions include Little Shop of Horrors (2019 revival), Brooklynite, On the Verge (New York Premiere), Isn't It Romantic (World Premiere), The Cradle Will Rock, The Rise and Rise of Daniel Rocket (World Premiere), Henry V (Public Theatre), King Lear (Cornwall), and On The Air, A Nostalgiaspoof Review of the Golden Age of Radio (Van Buren's New York Premiere). Robbins also appeared in regional productions of The Whale (Charlie, World Premiere), A Midsummer Night's Dream (Bottom), Fiddler on the Roof (Tevye), The Producers (Franz). Man of La Mancha (Sancho), My Name Is Asher Lev, and Taming of the Shrew (Tranio).

Robbins appeared in episodes of The Good Wife, Seinfeld, NYPD Blue, Law & Order and Baby Talk (as series regular Dr. Elliot Fleisher).

Robbins is also a writer. His first play, The Joke the Rabbit Told Me, won the NAAA Playreading competition in London and received a reading at the Tristan Bates Theatre in the West End. His play, Muse, won the 2019 New Works of Merit Playwriting Contest and received a reading at the Playroom Theatre in New York.

== Filmography ==
=== Film ===
Year	Title	Role	Notes
1994	The Swan Princess	Musician	Voice
1995	Pocahontas	—N/a	Video reference cast

=== Television ===
Year	Title	Role	Notes
1991	Baby Talk	Dr. Elliot Fleisher	12 episodes
1992	A Different World	Record Executive	Episode: "Just Another Four-Letter Word"
1993	Murder, She Wrote	Assistant Manager	Episode: "Dead End"
1993	Down the Shore	Vic	Episode: "Brilliant Disguise"
1993	Tales of the City	Supermarket Creep	Episode #1.1
1993	Seinfeld	Stan	Episode: "The Bris"
1993	NYPD Blue	Larry Kohnstam	Episode: "Personal Foul"
2001, 2010	Law & Order: Special Victims Unit	Gary / Ed Kushner	2 episodes
2003, 2009	Law & Order	Phil Reight / ADA Thomas Hume	2 episodes
2005	Third Watch	Dr. Mitchell / Doctor	2 episodes
2006	Law & Order: Criminal Intent	Arnold Curry	Episode: "Slither"
2015	Forever	Phil Fleishman	Episode: "Diamonds Are Forever"
2015	The Good Wife	Hank Wilson	Episode: "Innocents"
2019	The Code	Jewish Chaplain	Episode: "Lioness"

=== Stage ===
Year	Title	Role	Notes
1987	Les Misérables	Thénardier	1st National Tour
1989	Jerome Robbins' Broadway	Ensemble	Broadway
1989	Threepenny Opera	Walter	Broadway
1993	Sunset Boulevard	Ensemble	Los Angeles; Broadway (1994)
1996	Once Upon a Mattress	Master Merton; The King Sextimus (understudy)	Broadway
1997	The Lion King	Pumbaa	Broadway
2000	Tenderloin	Joe	Encores! Concert
2004	Pardon My English	Dr. Adolph Steiner	Encores! Concert
2007	Is He Dead?	Hans von Bismarck	Broadway
2010	Newsies The Musical	Governor Roosevelt; Ensemble	Workshop; Broadway (2012)
2015	Brooklynite	Performer	Off-Broadway
2016	1776	Performer	Off-Broadway
2021	Little Shop of Horrors	Mushnik	Off-Broadway
2022	A Beautiful Noise, The Neil Diamond Musical	Bert Berns; Kieve Diamond	Broadway

== Awards and nominations ==
Year	Award	Category	Work	Result	Ref.
2021	Grammy Awards	Best Musical Theater Album	Little Shop of Horrors	Nominated	
