= Vamps (film) =

2012 film by Amy Heckerling

- Theatrical release poster
- Directed by: Amy Heckerling
- Written by: Amy Heckerling
- Produced by: Lauren Versel; Molly Hassell; Stuart Cornfeld; Maria Teresa Arida; Adam Brightman
- Starring: Alicia Silverstone; Krysten Ritter; Dan Stevens; Richard Lewis; Wallace Shawn; Justin Kirk; Kristen Johnston; Malcolm McDowell; Sigourney Weaver
- Cinematography: Tim Suhrstedt
- Edited by: Debra Chiate
- Music by: David Kitay
- Production companies: Red Hour Films; Lucky Monkey Pictures
- Distributed by: Anchor Bay Films
- Release dates: August 25, 2012 (Fantasy Filmfest); November 2, 2012 (United States)
- Running time: 92 minutes
- Country: United States
- Language: English
- Box office: $92,748

Vamps is a 2012 American comedy horror film written and directed by Amy Heckerling and starring Alicia Silverstone, Krysten Ritter, Dan Stevens, Richard Lewis, Wallace Shawn, Justin Kirk, Kristen Johnston, Malcolm McDowell, and Sigourney Weaver. It tells the story of two vampires who do their best to keep up with trends and stay youthful while at the same time abstaining from human blood and contending with the evil vampire that is their stem. The film was released on November 2, 2012.

== Plot ==
Stacy and Goody are two vampires enjoying life in New York City. Goody was turned in 1841 by the vampire Cisserus. After leaving the man she fell in love with in the 1960s, she struggled with her life as a vampire until Stacy was turned by Cisserus in 1992. Goody was able to teach Stacy how to use her new abilities, like sustaining themselves on rat blood, while Stacy helps Goody stay youthful and trendy. Goody keeps her actual age a secret because she is afraid of being viewed as old by Stacy. While at a vampire meeting, Goody discovers that if their maker or "stem" Cisserus is ever killed, she and Stacy would revert to their human ages.

While working at a hospital as an exterminator, Goody runs into her ex-boyfriend Danny, whom she has not seen since the 1960s. They re-connect under the pretense that she is Goody's daughter, but Danny eventually learns the truth when he sees her bite into another man to prevent a stroke. When he asks why she left him, Goody explains that even though she loved him, she did not want to stand in his way of finding someone he could actually build a life with.

Meanwhile, the government is using the Patriot Act to track down vampires, causing panic amongst the vampire's anonymous group. Goody comes up with a plan to delete and change all the information about all the vampires in the New York area during a solar eclipse. After they succeed, the vamps throw a party for both human and non-human feeders. It is all endangered by the threat of Cisserus who did not attend and massacred an entire restaurant full of people.

Stacy begins a relationship with a young college student named Joey. It is soon revealed that Joey is the son of the infamous vampire slayer Dr. Van Helsing who is in town to find and kill vampires. After spending the night at Joey's place, he sees Stacy crawling down the side of his apartment building in order to get home before the sun rises. Despite his initial shock, Joey accepts that Stacy is a vampire and the two resume dating. Stacy soon discovers she is pregnant and is informed that the baby will not survive unless she becomes human again which can only happen if they kill Cisserus.

The girls team up with Joey and Helsing and after a struggle, they end up killing Cisserus so that Stacy can keep her baby and have a future with Joey. Stacy looks relatively the same despite being forty years old, but Goody rapidly ages into an old woman. Revealing her actual age, Goody accompanies Joey and Stacy to Times Square where Goody reminisces about her life. As the sun rises, Goody disintegrates into sand as a side effect of her old age.

A few years later as the credits roll, Stacy and Joey show up at Helsing's house to pick up their young daughter, whom they have named after Goody. As Helsing plays with his granddaughter, he notices that the little girl sports a set of vampire fangs. Rather than being horrified, he seems amused.

== Cast ==
- Alicia Silverstone as Goody Rutherford
- Krysten Ritter as Stacy Daimer
- Dan Stevens as Joey Van Helsing
- Richard Lewis as Danny Horowitz
- Wallace Shawn as Dr. Van Helsing
- Justin Kirk as Vadim
- Kristen Johnston as Mrs. Van Helsing
- Malcolm McDowell as Vlad Tepish
- Sigourney Weaver as Cisserus
- Marilu Henner as Angela Horowitz
- Zak Orth as Renfield
- Larry Wilmore as Professor Quincy
- Meredith Scott Lynn as Rita
- Brian Backer as The Dentist
- Taylor Negron as The Pizza Guy
- Amir Arison as Derek
- Todd Barry as Ivan
- Gael García Bernal as Diego Bardem
- Joel Michaely as Peter
- Ivan Sergei as Detective

== Production ==
=== Casting ===
Alicia Silverstone, who had already starred in Heckerling's Clueless, was offered the role after Heckerling came to see her in Time Stands Still. Krysten Ritter was Heckerling's first choice for the role of Stacy. Michelle Pfeiffer was initially offered the role of Ciccerus, but had to turn it down due to scheduling commitments. Taylor Negron's pizza deliveryman character was a nod to Heckerling's earlier film Fast Times at Ridgemont High, where Negron's character delivers a pizza to Jeff Spicoli (Sean Penn) in a high school classroom.

=== Filming ===
Principal photography lasted 37 days in Detroit, while using New York for exterior shots. Red Hour Films produced the film, alongside Lucky Monkey Pictures.

== Release ==
A limited theatrical release began on November 2, 2012, followed by a Blu-ray and DVD release.

== Reception ==
Rotten Tomatoes gives the film a 56% based on 18 reviews from critics, with an average rating of 5.47/10.

== See also ==
- Vampire film
