= Tom Ropelewski =

American screenwriter, producer and director

- Born: United States.
- Occupations: Screenwriter; producer; director
- Known for: Look Who's Talking Now
- Spouse: Leslie Dixon
- Children: 1

Tom Ropelewski is an American screenwriter, producer and director. He is best known for films Look Who's Talking Now, Loverboy, The Next Best Thing, and The Kiss.

He is married to screenwriter/producer, Leslie Dixon.

In May 2006, Ropelewski and Evan Katz were hired to write the script for an action film entitled Game Boys for Walt Disney Pictures and Jerry Bruckheimer Films. As of June 2018, the project remains in development hell.

== Filmography ==
Directed features
Year	Title	Role
1987	Blind Date	Co-writer (uncredited)
1988	The Kiss	Co-writer
1989	Loverboy	Co-writer
1990	Madhouse	Writer and director
1993	Look Who's Talking Now	Co-writer
2000	The Next Best Thing	Writer
2010	Child of Giants	Director
2015	2e: Twice Exceptional	Director
2015	2e2: Teaching the Twice Exceptional	Director
