= Tabitha Lupien =

Canadian actress

- Born: Tabitha Lee Lupien; Toronto, Ontario, Canada
- Occupations: Actress; dancer
- Years active: 1993–present

Tabitha Lupien is a Canadian actress and competitive dancer trained in ballet, tap, jazz, pointe, hip hop, and acrobatics. She trains with her sisters Lindsay and Samantha and her brother Isaac Lupien at the Canadian Dance Company, owned by her parents Allain and Dawn, located in Oakville, Ontario. She is best known for her role as Julie Ubriacco from Look Who's Talking Now. She had a minor role in the 2007 film version of Hairspray as Becky and guest starred in the TV series The L.A. Complex as a defeated dancer six years later.

== Filmography ==
Year	Title	Role	Notes
1993	Look Who's Talking Now	Julie Ubriacco	
1994	The Santa Clause	Ballet Girl	
1995	Rent-a-Kid	Molly Ward	
1996	Bogus	Girl At Party	
1996	Goosebumps	Ginny Swanson	Episode: "Bad Hare Day"
1997	Ready or Not	Phoebe	Episode: "All or Nothing"; Episode: "Cross My Heart"; Episode: "Great Is...Great"
1997	That Old Feeling	Flower Girl	
1997	Goosebumps	Jamie Gold	Episode: "Click"
2002	Salem Witch Trials (TV mini-series)	Jane Porter	
2007	Hairspray	Becky	
2012	The L.A. Complex	Defeated Dancer	Episode: "Burn It Down"
