= New Haven Underground Film Festival =

The New Haven Underground Film Festival is an annual film festival held in Connecticut, United States. Despite its name, the event itself has never been held in New Haven; instead, it has been held in other Connecticut cities while carrying the slogan "So underground that it's not even in New Haven."

This festival has hosted premieres and screenings of independent, underground and experimental productions from around the world, including a mix of narrative and non-fiction features and shorts. Among the more notable films presented at the festival were My Big Fat Independent Movie, Flatland and Plan 9 from Syracuse.
