= Look Who's Talking Now! =

1993 American comedy film by Tom Ropelewski

- Theatrical release poster
- Directed by: Tom Ropelewski
- Written by: Tom Ropelewski; Leslie Dixon
- Based on: Characters by Amy Heckerling
- Produced by: Jonathan D. Krane
- Starring: John Travolta; Kirstie Alley; Danny DeVito; Diane Keaton; Olympia Dukakis; Lysette Anthony; George Segal
- Cinematography: Oliver Stapleton
- Edited by: Henry Hitner; Michael A. Stevenson
- Music by: William Ross
- Distributed by: TriStar Pictures
- Release date: November 5, 1993
- Running time: 95 minutes
- Countries: United States; Canada
- Language: English
- Budget: $22 million
- Box office: $10.3 million

Look Who's Talking Now! is a 1993 romantic comedy film, a sequel to 1990's Look Who's Talking Too, and the third and final installment overall in the Look Who's Talking franchise. Directed by Tom Ropelewski from a script written by Ropelewski and Leslie Dixon, the film included John Travolta and Kirstie Alley reprising their roles as James and Mollie Ubriacco, respectively, while David Gallagher and Tabitha Lupien portray their kids Mikey and Julie, respectively. Danny DeVito and Diane Keaton provide the internal voices of the family's newly acquired dogs Rocks and Daphne, respectively.

The plot centers around the competitive nature of the two animals, vying for the family's affection. Lysette Anthony, Olympia Dukakis, George Segal and Charles Barkley feature in the supporting cast. Bruce Willis, Joan Rivers and Roseanne Barr do not reprise their roles from the previous installments. Produced by TriStar Pictures, it was released on November 5, 1993.

Look Who's Talking Now! was received negatively by film critics, and underperformed at the box office, grossing $10.3 million against a production budget of $22 million.

== Plot ==
Two dogs, Trooper and Precious, are in a fling. Precious births a litter and her owner decides to give them away. One day, one of the puppies sees Mikey Ubriacco and his mother Mollie Jensen Ubriacco walking by, but Mollie rushes him onward, although the puppy catches his scent of cookies and dirt. He is taken by a pair of punks, but he manages to escape and becomes a stray dog.

Meanwhile, Mikey's dad James gets a job as a private jet pilot from his boss Samantha D'Bonne, who seemingly has ulterior motives for him and keeps him extra busy and away from his home leaving Mollie to care for their children Mikey and Julie after she is laid off from her job in accounting. She gets a part time job as an elf for a mall Santa Claus, and Mikey unexpectedly discovers that Santa is fake, destroying his belief in Santa Claus.

The puppy grows up wandering the streets and getting food from homeless men before getting caught and put into the pound. As a surprise, James takes Mikey to the pound to pick out a dog for Christmas only to run into the puppy who is on his way to being destroyed after being there too long. They adopt him and name him Rocks because "that's what he left all over the back seat" of James' cab. Samantha, having also heard that Mikey wanted a dog brings in a pure breed poodle named Daphne for them. She is highly trained and looks down on Rocks the moment they meet. Having no choice, James and Mollie agree to have both dogs to not offend Samantha or take Rocks back to be destroyed.

Rocks immediately gets the ire of Mollie by destroying her shoes and peeing in the house constantly. Eventually tired of Rocks, Daphne frames Rocks by chewing on a pair of Mollie's new shoes. She blows up at Rocks and tells him he is out, upsetting Mikey. Meanwhile James is called to work on Christmas Eve to fly Samantha to a private estate in northern New York and she effectively strands him there with her. Mollie, suspicious of Samantha gets her address and with the kids and dogs in tow, they head up to catch her, but Mollie crashes off the side of the road. Rocks, having picked up James' scent, goes off to find him while Daphne, learning how to smell out people goes in search of rangers to help.

James catches onto Samantha's plan just as Rocks arrives. Rocks pees on Samantha's leg and the two leave the house to find Molly and the others, not knowing Daphne had already gotten them rescued. They run into a pack of wolves and Rocks defends James, but the confrontation is ambiguous. Meanwhile, at the ranger station, Mikey sees who he thinks is Santa heading toward the station, but it turns out to be James. After a brief moment of worry that the wolves had destroyed his beeper, Rocks appears, apparently the pager sending the wolves off without harming either of them. The ranger turns on a broadcast from Santa on the radio, reigniting Mikey's belief in Santa Claus and Rocks is reinstated to the family for saving James from Samantha and the wolves.

== Cast ==
- John Travolta as James Ubriacco
- Kirstie Alley as Mollie Jensen Ubriacco
  - Alicia Bradsen as Young Mollie Jensen
- Olympia Dukakis as Rosie Jensen
  - Gina Chiarelli as Young Rosie Jensen
- Lysette Anthony as Samantha D'Bonne
- David Gallagher as Mikey Ubriacco
- Tabitha Lupien as Julie Ubriacco
- Danny DeVito as Rocks (voice)
- Diane Keaton as Daphne (voice)
- George Segal as Albert
- Charles Barkley as Himself
- John Stocker as Sol
- Mark Acheson as Dad
- Serge Houde as Maitre D'
- Roger Cross as Pilot
- Robert Wisden as Ranger
- Tegan Moss as Puppy Girl
- Andrew Airlie as Co-Pilot
- Campbell Lane as Lou Jensen
- Bob Bergen as Dog (voice)
- Peter Iacangelo as Dog (voice)
- Nick Jameson as Dog (voice)
- Patricia Parris as Dog (voice)
- Pat Pinney as Dog (voice)
- Rodney Saulsberry as Dog (voice)
- Jeff Winkless as Dog (voice)
- Jordy Lemoine as Himself

== Release ==
The film was released domestically on November 5, 1993 before international distribution including the United Kingdom on May 27, 1994.

=== Reception ===
On the review aggregator website Rotten Tomatoes, 0% of 23 critics' reviews are positive, with an average rating of 2.9/10. The website's consensus reads: "Look Who's Talking Now: Look away." Metacritic, which uses a weighted average, assigned the film a score of 26 out of 100, based on 19 critics, indicating "generally unfavorable" reviews. Audiences polled by CinemaScore gave the film an average grade of "B+" on an A+ to F scale.

Roger Ebert gave the film one star out of four and remarked that "it looks like it was chucked up by an automatic screenwriting machine". Gene Siskel gave the film zero stars and called it "an abysmal, embarrassing sequel". Dan Cox of Variety wrote: "Stretching a premise that one might say has gone to the dogs, Look Who's Talking Now runs feebly on the calculated steam of its forebears". Rita Kempley of The Washington Post wrote: "Take the 'dle' out of 'poodle' and you've pretty much got the leitmotif of Look Who's Talking Now, a crude and mawkish film in which dogs attempt to communicate with Kirstie Alley and John Travolta".

Stephen Holden of The New York Times was somewhat positive, writing that "the sound of stars mouthing the inner thoughts of dogs is somehow funnier than that of grownup actors doing wisecracking voice overs for gurgling infants". Peter Rainer of the Los Angeles Times was also somewhat positive, calling the film "borderline pleasant" because Travolta and Alley "are a marvelous team". Leonard Maltin's Movie Guide gave it two stars out of four, saying "the first one was cute, the second one was dreadful; this third entry in the series falls somewhere in between".

=== Box office ===
Look Who's Talking Now! was a box-office bomb, only earning over $10 million against its $22 million budget, making it the lowest-grossing film in the series. In its opening week, the film also faced stiff competition for an audience from The Nightmare Before Christmas.

== See also ==
- List of films with a 0% rating on Rotten Tomatoes
- List of Christmas films
