= Amy Heckerling =

American filmmaker (born 1954)

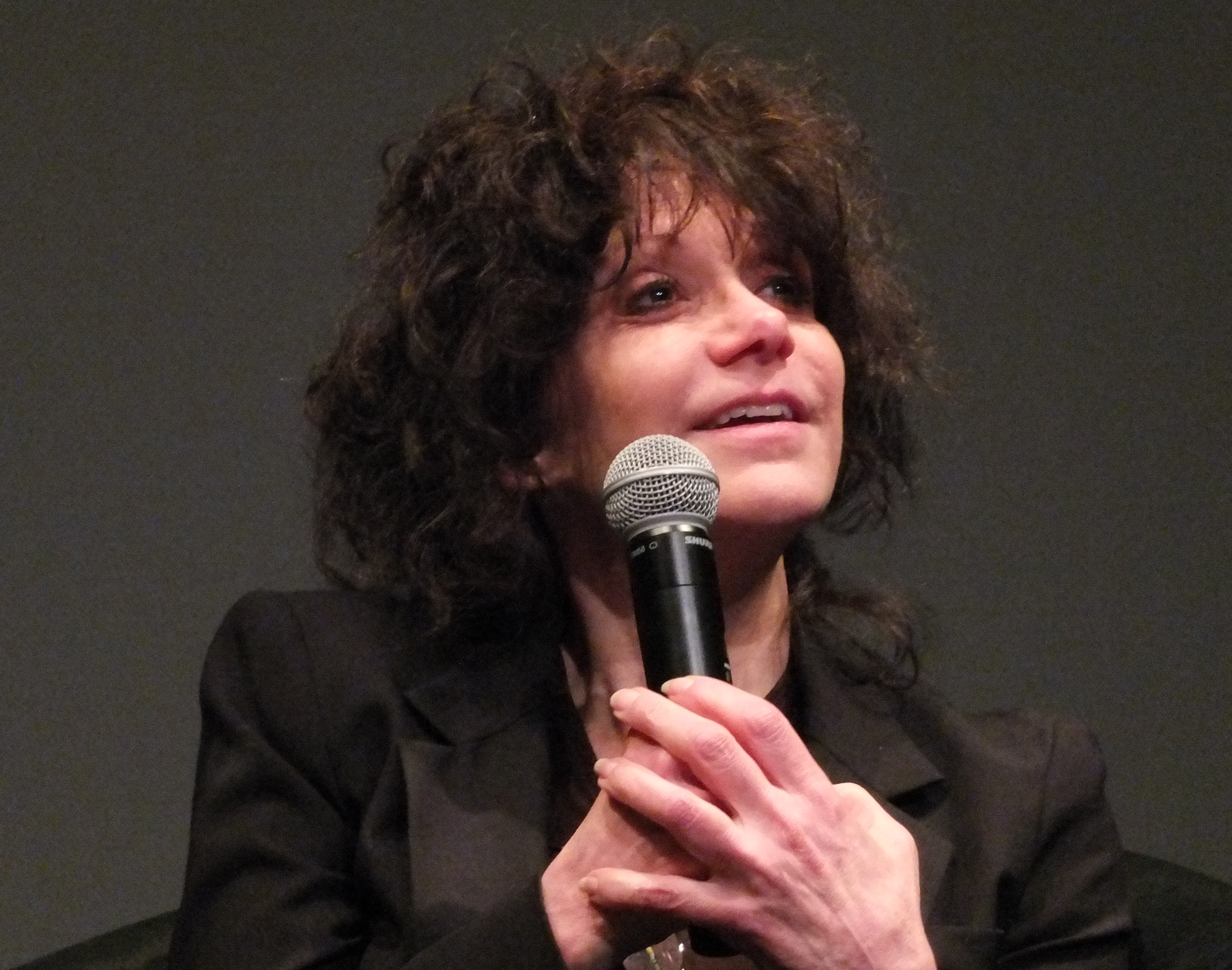
- Heckerling in 2017
- Born: May 7, 1954 (age 72); New York City, New York, U.S.
- Education: New York University (BA); AFI Conservatory (MFA)
- Occupations: Director; producer; writer
- Years active: 1977–present
- Spouses: David Brandt (m. 1981; div. 1983) Neal Israel (m. 1984; div. 1990)
- Children: 1

Amy Heckerling (born May 7, 1954) is an American writer, producer, and director. Heckerling started her career after graduating from New York University and entering the American Film Institute, making small student films. Heckerling is a recipient of AFI's Franklin J. Schaffner Alumni Medal celebrating her creative talents and artistic achievements. She struggled to break out into big films up until the release of Fast Times at Ridgemont High (1982).

She has also directed the films Johnny Dangerously (1984), National Lampoon's European Vacation (1985), Look Who's Talking (1989), Clueless (1995), Loser (2000), I Could Never be Your Woman (2007) and Vamps (2012). She was a producer on A Night at the Roxbury (1998) and executive producer on Molly (1999). Many of Heckerling's films were adapted as television series. Fast Times at Ridgemont High evolved into the series Fast Times (1986), while Clueless (1995) became a television series that ran from 1996 to 1999.

== Early life and education ==
Heckerling was born on May 7, 1954, in The Bronx, New York City, to a bookkeeper mother and an accountant father. She had a Jewish upbringing and remembers that the apartment building where she spent her early childhood was full of Holocaust survivors. "Most of them had tattoos on their arms and for me there was a feeling that all of these people had a story to tell. These were interesting formative experiences." Both of her parents worked full-time, so she frequently moved back and forth from her home in the Bronx, where Heckerling claims she was a latchkey kid sitting at home all day watching television, to her grandmother's home in Brooklyn, which she enjoyed much better. Here, she frequented Coney Island and stayed up watching films all night with her grandmother. At that time Heckerling loved television, where she watched numerous cartoons and old black and white movies. Her favorites were gangster movies, musicals and comedies. She had a particular fondness for James Cagney.

... when I saw Angels with Dirty Faces, Cagney was walking to the electric chair. Now I never understood what was going on in those movies, I just knew I loved them. I knew something bad was happening because of the music, so I started crying and crying. My mother told me that Cagney was going to the chair because he was a bad guy, and that he was going to die. I didn't know what that was, so she explained dying to me. It seemed pretty horrible, but then my mother told me that he wasn't really going to die because he was in a movie. Well, it just all seemed to click then! That was the way to beat it! I could see James Cagney die a million times, but he was always there. This year [1986] I didn't believe it really happened. I kept expecting Cagney to get up.

After her father passed his CPA exam, the family became more financially stable and moved to Queens, where Heckerling felt more out of place than ever. She did not get along with other kids in her school there, nor did she want to continue to be classmates with them through high school, so she enrolled at the High School of Art and Design in Manhattan. On her first day of school there, Heckerling realized that she wanted to be a film director. During their first assignment, writing about what they wanted to do in life, Heckerling wrote that she wanted to be a writer or artist for Mad. She noticed that a boy next to her, that she claimed copied from her papers later on, wrote that he wanted to be a film director.

I was really annoyed because I thought that if an idiot like that guy could say he wanted to be a director, then so could I, and certainly I should be a director more than he should. It had never occurred to me that that was a job possibility. He put the thought in my head because until then I would never have thought of saying that I wanted to do that; it didn't seem to be one of the jobs in the world that could be open to me.

She graduated from high school in 1970, focused on directing and studying film at New York University's Tisch School of the Arts. Her father made just slightly over the cut-off for financial aid for the school, so Heckerling had to take out a large loan to cover her expenses. She claims this caused considerable stress in her life, and she was unable to pay them off until the end of her twenties. When Heckerling was in high school and focused on directing, her father was opposed to the idea, wishing that she had chosen a more practical aspiration. Despite this, he gave her Parker Tyler's book Classics of the Foreign Film: A Pictorial Legacy. Heckerling pored over the book, marking off films that she had seen until she had eventually watched most of them. She claims that by the time she got to NYU, because of this book, she had seen almost all of the films that they had to watch in her classes.

Heckerling enjoyed her time at NYU, where she learned a lot and made great connections, such as Martin Brest, as well as noted screenwriter and satirist Terry Southern, who was one of her professors. Later she reflected on her time at the school as sloppy and unprofessional, saying that she had used very low-quality equipment and went through numerous technical problems. During her time at NYU, Heckerling was making mostly musicals. "I was the only one doing them and they were weird. It was the mid-70s and it was a bizarre combination of long hair with bell bottoms, the tail end of the hippie movement at its schlumpiest. With this, I sort of infused a 1930s idiotic grace that didn't go with the post-Watergate mentality that was prevalent at the time. They were weird films, but they got me into AFI."

== Career ==
After graduating from NYU, Heckerling decided that she wanted to follow her friend Martin Brest to the American Film Institute Conservatory in Los Angeles, where she felt there would be more opportunities to break into the business. Heckerling experienced severe culture shock upon moving to LA, especially because NYC's public transportation had made it unnecessary for her to learn to drive. She eventually adjusted, and began working. Her first studio job was lip-syncing dailies for a television show, where she started making connections in the business.

During her second year at AFI, Heckerling made her first short film, Getting it Over With, about a girl that wants to lose her virginity before she turns twenty and the adventures she has before midnight of her twentieth birthday. Heckerling continued to work on the film after she graduated from AFI with her MFA, using the editing studios at night to finish the project after work. As soon as she finished the edit and sent it away to be processed, she was in a car collision with a drunk driver who hit the side of her car. Hospitalized with a collapsed lung, bruised kidney, and mild amnesia, she was fired from her editing job because she could not remember where certain footage was.

When asked about film's ability to grant a form of immortality, Heckerling describes the experience during the accident: "There was the whole thing-the yellow light and all that stuff-and what went through my mind right then was, 'Well, at least I got the film to the lab.' So it's not going to save you from anything, obviously, but something about it pulls you forward." Eventually, she finished the film and held a screening that gained a very positive response, causing Heckerling to call it one of the best days of her life. Her next step was to use the film to get a job. Thom Mount, president of Universal Pictures, showed a lot of interest in Heckerling, but because she was not backed by an agent they could not hire her. After months of struggling to find an agent, Mount called Heckerling and asked her to make a film.

=== Feature films ===
==== 1980s ====
Heckerling's first feature was Fast Times at Ridgemont High (1982), based on the non-fiction account of a year in the life of California high school students as observed by undercover Rolling Stone journalist Cameron Crowe. When Heckerling first signed on to do a feature for Universal, she read a lot of scripts, but it was Crowe's script for Fast Times at Ridgemont High that stood out to her. Although she loved the script, she felt that it bore the marks of excessive studio interference, so she read the novel, determined which parts were strongest, and sat down with Crowe to rework the script. The film helped launch the careers of numerous stars, including Jennifer Jason Leigh, Judge Reinhold and Phoebe Cates.

In addition, it marks early appearances by several actors who later became stars, including Nicolas Cage, Forest Whitaker, Eric Stoltz, and Anthony Edwards. Most notable, however, is the appearance of Sean Penn as Jeff Spicoli, who was launched into stardom by his performance. Heckerling describes casting Penn, whom she first met while he was sitting on the floor outside of the casting office, as a feeling of being overwhelmed by his intensity, even though all he had done was look up at her. She knew that this was her Spicoli, even though they had seen other people who had read better for the role. Ally Sheedy read for the role of Leigh's character Stacy Hamilton, but Heckerling decided that she wanted someone that seemed younger and more fragile (though Jennifer Jason Leigh is more than four months older than Ally Sheedy).

Heckerling was discriminating about the film's soundtrack. Originally, the film was supposed to have music in it by bands like the Eagles. "I guess a lot of people like that stuff, but being young as I was at the time, I really wanted a new edgy eighties music soundtrack. I wanted Fear, Oingo Boingo, The Go-Gos, Talking Heads, and the Dead Kennedys. I was one of those obnoxious teenagers that thought that the music I liked was great and everything else sucked. Getting that Oingo Boingo song in the film was a big fight. But I had to make some compromises and put in some songs that I didn't like at all."

The studio was unsure of how to market the film, and Heckerling guesses that they did not think that anyone would want to watch it. The studio decided to just open it in a few hundred or so theaters on the west coast without any advertisement. Once the film opened, it was a huge success, leading the studio to quickly open it at theaters around the country. It became an instant hit right out of the gate, eventually going on to become a pop culture touchstone. The film earned $27,092,880 at the box office in the USA. It also spawned a short-lived series on CBS called Fast Times, with Heckerling writing, directing and producing.

After doing Fast Times at Ridgemont High, Heckerling was bombarded with similar but lesser scripts. It was hard for her to find anything that wasn't about high school, preppy kids, or a story about a girl losing her virginity. Eventually she found her next film, Johnny Dangerously (1984), with Michael Keaton, Joe Piscopo, Danny DeVito, Dom DeLuise, and Peter Boyle, was an Airplane!-style spoof of gangster movies, but it failed to catch fire at the box office upon its initial release. Heckerling attributes the film's failure to the public's lack of familiarity with the gangster movies that the film was poking fun at. "It was pure satire of something nobody remembers. I think that was the main problem, because all the actors and writers did great jobs. But we were definitely satirizing something ... I mean, unless you watch 1930s movies on TV at night, people don't remember. Somebody told me that during a screening they were sitting next to Brian De Palma, who had just done Scarface, and he was in hysterics. If you studied those movies, you know what we were doing." In subsequent years, however, it has garnered a substantial cult audience.

The following year, she directed National Lampoon's European Vacation (1985) with Chevy Chase and Beverly D'Angelo, a sequel to the popular National Lampoon's Vacation. With it, Heckerling scored her second solid hit, earning $74,964,621 at the box office. The film, like many of Heckerling's films, received poor reviews from critics but proved to be very popular with audiences. Heckerling, despite being well educated and loving the work of such intellectual writers as Franz Kafka, has admitted that she loves "silly things," which has proven to make her commercially successful in the comedy genre.

In 1989, Heckerling had her biggest success with Look Who's Talking, starring John Travolta, Kirstie Alley and a baby voiced by Bruce Willis. Heckerling got the idea for the film while she was pregnant with her daughter and developed it into a feature. Heckerling says that she loves to write comedies, such as Look Who's Talking, because she notes that when a film is made, everyone working on it puts more than a year of their lives into making it, so she wants that year to be happy and fun. Heckerling, who loved Travolta, was ecstatic to work with him, though many people consider the film's release to be during the end of a low point in Travolta's career. The film has been Heckerling's highest-grossing film to date, earning $296,999,813. After the film's release, Heckerling was able to cross off the second of two goals that she had set for herself in college, the first being to make a studio feature, which she did with Fast Times at Ridgemont High, and the second being: "I wanted to have hits the way boys had hits, not like a 'girl hit' that made 50 million, but a boy hit that made 100s of millions."

==== 1990s ====
Two Look Who's Talking sequels would follow—1990's Look Who's Talking Too—also directed by Heckerling and co-written with her then-husband Neal Israel. The film added another baby to the storyline and was a moderate success. Heckerling then produced, but did not direct, the third and final sequel, Look Who's Talking Now—a flop. The films also spawned a brief television show called Baby Talk, although Heckerling had little involvement.

In 1995, she wrote and directed Clueless, reworking and updating Jane Austen's Emma as a 1990s teen comedy about wealthy teenagers living in Beverly Hills. Heckerling originally thought of Clueless as a television show, because she loved to write the character of Cher, who she saw as a "happy, optimistic, California girl", and wanted to explore all of her adventures, but after she pitched it to her agent she was told that it would make a great feature. To research for the script, Heckerling sat in on classes at Beverly Hills High School where she observed how teenagers acted, although she admits that most of the movie script was made up. She notes that teenagers at the high school did not dress in high fashion every day as the characters do in the film; in reality the students there dressed just as frumpily as everyone else. She did, however draw on many of her observations, especially the tendency of teenage girls to groom themselves constantly. "You would think that within, you know, the few minutes that they've been in class, that their makeup wouldn't be needing so much repair and yet they're constantly painting and sculpting and ... doing to themselves."

As with Fast Times at Ridgemont High, it quickly caught on with teenagers and went on to become a significant pop culture reference point. The film went on to gross $56,631,572 and helped launch the careers of most of the cast, including Alicia Silverstone, Brittany Murphy, Paul Rudd, Donald Faison, Breckin Meyer, and Stacey Dash. It was spun off into a moderately successful TV series, with Heckerling writing the pilot, and also directing several episodes from the first season. She described the show as basically the same as the film, only cleaner, and says that she still loves the characters.

==== 2000–present ====
Heckerling directed and produced Loser (2000), a romantic college comedy with Jason Biggs and Mena Suvari. The film was not a critical or commercial success. After a break, Heckerling's romantic comedy I Could Never Be Your Woman (2007), starring Michelle Pfeiffer and Paul Rudd, never opened in theaters; rather, it received a direct-to-video release domestically, despite fairly good notices. Production of the film was troubled by financial issues, including the rights to distribution being sold off without Heckerling's knowledge, making it difficult for her to sell the film to a studio. At the time, Heckerling was also taking care of both of her parents who were very ill (her father was in the hospital and her mother had cancer). Though Heckerling disliked the baggage that the film carried and was upset about it not being released theatrically, she says that the experience was significant for her because she loved working with Rudd and Pfeiffer in England. Heckerling also directed an episode of the NBC version of The Office.

In 2011, Heckerling directed the horror-comedy film Vamps with Sigourney Weaver, Alicia Silverstone and Krysten Ritter, about two vampires living in New York City as best friends and roommates. The film was released to theatres on November 2, 2012, followed by a DVD release on November 13. On July 4, 2016, Gilbert Gottfried posted an in-depth 81-minute interview with Heckerling on his podcast. In July 2017, a musical version of Clueless helmed by Tony nominee Kristin Hanggi received a developmental lab in New York City. A previous workshop starring Taylor Louderman (Kinky Boots) and Dave Thomas Brown (Heathers) took place in 2016. Heckerling wrote the libretto for the musical. The musical opened Off-Broadway on November 20, 2018 with Dove Cameron in the lead role.

== Filmmaking style ==
Heckerling's films have been characterized as having a proto-feminist perspective. Heckerling focuses on the female life at pivotal turning points. With films such as Fast Times at Ridgemont High and Clueless, Heckerling has focused on women finishing high school and going into what would be their adult lives. Her characters are constantly going against the norms that women are pushed into within society. Heckerling has a tendency to prioritize the female friendships within her films, along with a larger discussion of gender positioning within teenagers' lifestyles.

== Personal life ==
Heckerling dated fellow film director Martin Brest when she first moved to Los Angeles. Though they later broke up, they remained good friends. Heckerling's first marriage was to musician David Brandt, from 1981 to 1983. At one point she hired director Neal Israel to work on one of her films. Ten months afterward, he asked her out; they married in July 1984. The marriage ended with a 1990 divorce.

The couple's daughter, Mollie Israel, was born in 1985. Mollie was led to believe Israel was her biological father until 2004, when it was revealed to her that in fact Harold Ramis was her biological father. Heckerling has included Mollie in some of her films in bit parts, including Look Who's Talking and Loser, though Heckerling claims that her daughter never wanted to be a "girly girl" and distanced herself from much of her work, never adding any input to the lives of characters such as those in Clueless. Despite this, the two get along very well and Mollie frequently introduces her mother to new music, such as OK Go, and films.

Actor and comedian Chris Kattan claimed in his 2019 memoir Baby, Don't Hurt Me: Stories and Scars from Saturday Night Live that he was pressured by Lorne Michaels to have sex with Heckerling so she would direct the 1998 film A Night at the Roxbury (although she ultimately only produced, rather than directed it). Heckerling's daughter Mollie disputes the claim, saying that although Heckerling and Kattan had an affair, it began once the film was already shooting.. When asked about the matter during an interview with The Daily Beast , Heckerling referred to Kattan as a "nut" and stated, "You know, I don’t comment about that, because basically I have no interest in helping his book sales. I don’t even want to know or hear the dumb shit he came up with.”

== Awards and nominations ==
In 1995, Heckerling won the National Society of Film Critics Best Screenplay award and was nominated for the Writers Guild of America award for Best Screenplay Written Directly for the Screen for her screenplay, Clueless. The film was also nominated for a WGA Award for Best Screenplay. In 1998, she received the Franklin J. Schaffner Medal from the American Film Institute. In 1999, she received the Women in Film Crystal Award for outstanding women who, through endurance and excellence, have helped to expand the role of women within the entertainment industry.

== Filmography ==
=== Film work ===
Year	Title	Director	Writer	Producer	Notes
1977	Getting It Over With	Yes	Yes	No	Short film – AFI thesis film
1982	Fast Times at Ridgemont High	Yes	No	No	
1984	Johnny Dangerously	Yes	No	No	
1985	National Lampoon's European Vacation	Yes	No	No	
1989	Look Who's Talking	Yes	Yes	No	
1990	Look Who's Talking Too	Yes	Yes	No	
1993	Look Who's Talking Now!	No	No	Yes	
1995	Clueless	Yes	Yes	Yes	
1998	A Night at the Roxbury	No	No	Yes	
1999	Molly	No	No	Executive	
2000	Loser	Yes	Yes	Yes	
2007	I Could Never Be Your Woman	Yes	Yes	No	
2012	Vamps	Yes	Yes	No	

=== Television work ===
Year	Title	Director	Writer	Producer	Creator	Notes
1986	Fast Times	Yes	Yes	Yes	No	3 episodes
1988	Life on the Flipside	No	No	Yes	No	TV movie
1991–92	Baby Talk	No	Yes	No	No	35 episodes (characters created by)
1996–99	Clueless	Yes	Yes	Executive	Yes	4 episodes
2005	The Office	Yes	No	No	No	Episode: "Hot Girl"
2012	Gossip Girl	Yes	No	No	No	Episodes: "Father and the Bride" and "Monstrous Ball"
2013–14	The Carrie Diaries	Yes	No	No	No	3 episodes
2014	Suburgatory	Yes	No	No	No	Episode: "Victor Ha"
2014	Rake	Yes	No	No	No	Episode: "Three Strikes"
2015–17	Red Oaks	Yes	No	No	No	6 episodes
2019	Weird City	Yes	No	No	No	2 episodes
2020	Royalties	Yes	No	No	No	10 episodes

=== Acting roles ===
Year	Title	Role	Notes
1985	Into the Night	Ships Waitress	
1995	Clueless	Maid of Honor	Uncredited
1996	Eek! The Cat	Nel Erving (voice)	Episode: "Bonfire of the Vanna Tea" (Klutter! segment)
2020	Royalties	Cindy McMann	Episode: "Kick Your Shoes Off", uncredited

== See also ==
- List of New York University alumni

== Bibliography ==
- Hurd, Mary G. Women Directors and Their Films. Westport, Conn: Praeger, 2007. Print. ISBN 9780275985783
- Jarecki, Nicholas. Breaking In: How 20 Film Directors Got Their Start. 2001. 142–156. Print. ISBN 0767906748
- Singer, Michael. A Cut Above. 1998. 81–85. Print. ISBN 1580650007
