= Neal Israel =

American director, producer and writer

- Born: July 27, 1945 (age 81)
- Occupations: Director; producer; writer
- Years active: 1973–2015
- Spouses: Lori Lieberman (m. 1979; div. 1980) Amy Heckerling (m. 1984; div. 1990)

Neal Israel (born July 27, 1945) is an American film and television director, screenwriter, and producer best known for his comedic work in the 1980s for films such as Police Academy, Real Genius, and Bachelor Party. Israel has also directed episodes for several TV shows, including The Fresh Beat Band, Lizzie McGuire, Zeke and Luther, Dog with a Blog, and I Didn't Do It.

== Biography ==
=== Career ===
Raised in Manhattan in a Jewish family, Israel started his career on the Broadway stage as assistant to legendary director George Abbott. After working at the New Dramatists Guild and the Eugene O'Neill Playwrights Conference, he came to Los Angeles, and was an executive at both ABC and CBS. During this time he wrote and directed the break through indie hit Tunnel Vision, which introduced such future stars as Chevy Chase, John Candy and Al Franken.

On television, he wrote Ringo, a special that starred Ringo Starr and George Harrison. He then wrote with his partner, Pat Proft, the first Police Academy movie, which spawned six sequels. He directed and co-wrote Bachelor Party, which starred Tom Hanks. He followed this with the comedy Moving Violations. Real Genius, another of his scripts, was made into a successful film starring Val Kilmer, and in 1987, he produced the film Three O'Clock High. He also directed Breaking The Rules starring Jason Bateman and the cult classic Surf Ninjas with Rob Schneider and Leslie Nielsen.

Neal continues to work in both film and television as a writer, director, producer, and script doctor. He has directed numerous movies of the week, pilots, and episodes of shows such as The Wonder Years, Nash Bridges, Joan of Arcadia, and Even Stevens. Recent directing credits include Disney's Zeke and Luther and Kickin It. In 2004, he executive-produced the Academy Award-nominated film Finding Neverland, which starred Johnny Depp and Kate Winslet.

In July 2017, Israel said he was working on a comedy with his longterm partner Pat Proft that will feature stars of the predominant comedic films of the '70s and '80s.

=== Personal life ===
His first marriage was to American singer/songwriter Lori Lieberman. They divorced in 1980. After being hired by director Amy Heckerling to work on Johnny Dangerously, the two began a relationship and married in July 1984. The couple divorced in 1990 after making Look Who's Talking Too together. Israel believed their daughter, Mollie, was biologically his until a DNA test showed she was the biological daughter of director Harold Ramis.

== Filmography ==
=== Film ===
Year	Title	Director	Writer	Notes
1976	Tunnel Vision	Yes	Yes	credited as Neil Israel, co-directed with Bradley R. Swirnoff
1977	Cracking Up	No	Yes	
1979	Americathon	Yes	Yes	
1984	Police Academy	No	Yes	
1984	Bachelor Party	Yes	Yes	
1985	Moving Violations	Yes	Yes	
1985	Real Genius	No	Yes	
1990	Look Who's Talking Too	No	Yes	
1992	Breaking the Rules	Yes	No	a.k.a. Sketches
1993	Surf Ninjas	Yes	No	

Producer

- Three O'Clock High (1987)
- The Runner (1999)

Executive producer

- Chocolate for Breakfast (1998)
- Finding Neverland (2004)
- Bachelor Party 2: The Last Temptation (2008)

=== Television ===
Director

- The George Burns Comedy Week (1985)
- The Wonder Years (1991)
- Harts of the West (1994)
- Love Boat: The Next Wave (1999)
- Clueless (1997–1999)
- Shasta McNasty (1999)
- Even Stevens (2000)
- Lizzie McGuire (2001)
- The Mind of the Married Man (2001)
- Family Affair (2002)
- Do Over (2002)
- Phil of the Future (2004)
- Joan of Arcadia (2005)
- Flight 29 Down (2007)
- About a Girl (2007)
- The Fresh Beat Band (2010)
- Zeke and Luther (2011)
- Kickin' It (2011)
- Dog with a Blog (2012)
- I Didn't Do It (2015)

Producer

- Twilight Theater (1982)
- CBS Summer Playhouse (1988)
- Miracles (2003)

Writer

- Yogi's Gang (1973)
- All Commercials... A Steve Martin Special (1980)

TV movies

Year	Title	Director	Producer	Writer
1986	Combat Academy	Yes	No	No
1989	The Cover Girl and the Cop	Yes	No	No
1989	Dream Date	No	Yes	No
1992	Bonnie & Clyde: The True Story	No	Yes	No
1993	Taking the Heat	No	Yes	No
1995	Family Reunion: A Relative Nightmare	Yes	Yes	Yes
1996	Kidz in the Wood	Yes	Yes	Yes
1997	Dad's Week Off	Yes	No	Yes
1999	The Patty Duke Show: Still Rockin' in Brooklyn Heights	No	No	Yes
2001	Hounded	Yes	No	No
2001	The Poof Point	Yes	No	No
2002	The Brady Bunch in the White House	Yes	No	No
2003	National Lampoon's Thanksgiving Family Reunion	Yes	No	No

== Awards and nominations ==
Year	Award	Result	Category	Series
1981	Writers Guild of America Award	Won	Variety, Musical or Comedy	All Commercials... A Steve Martin Special (Shared with Jeffrey Barron, Earl Brown, Carmen Finestra, Denny Johnston, Sean Kelly, Steve Martin, Pat McCormick, Michael McManus, Pat Proft, and Mason Williams)
2002	BAFTA Awards	Nominated	Best International	Lizzie McGuire (Shared with Susan Estelle Jansen)
