= A, My Name is Alex =

- Family Ties episodes
- Episode nos.: Season 5 Episodes 23 & 24
- Directed by: Will Mackenzie
- Written by: Gary David Goldberg & Alan Uger
- Original air date: March 12, 1987
- Running time: 60 minutes

Guest appearances
- Brian McNamara; Richard McGonagle; David Wohl; Meg Wyllie

Episode chronology
| ← Previous "Keaton vs. Keaton" | Next → ""D" is for Date" |

"A, My Name Is Alex" is a two-part hour-long very special episode of the NBC television series Family Ties. The episodes aired on March 12, 1987, as an hour-long episode, with the second half-hour broadcast without commercials.

The episode won numerous awards, including a Primetime Emmy Award, a Humanitas Prize and a Writers Guild of America Award for writing as well as a DGA Award. In 1997, TV Guide named this episode on their list of 100 Greatest Episodes.

== Plot ==
=== Part 1 ===
While the rest of the Keaton family grieves over the sudden death of Alex's childhood friend Greg McCormick, Alex himself is acting strangely, gradually being overcome by a volatile mixture of emotions that he futilely tries to hide. We learn that Greg was killed in a car crash while running an errand that Alex had declined to help him with.

After Greg's funeral, Alex begins showing symptoms of survivor guilt, admitting to Mallory that, "My life was saved out of smallness, out of lack of generosity to a friend"; he then says that he should have been in the car with Greg, and then angrily asks himself, "Why am I alive??". Steven and Elyse attempt to comfort Alex, and help him deal with his emotion by getting him professional help.

=== Part 2 ===
Alex is talking with an unseen therapist, who helps him to confront the issues he must now deal with resulting from Greg's untimely death. Through play-acting, Alex revisits his grade school days and situations with his family and attempts to reassess his own life.

When the therapist asks if he believes in God, Alex's analytical side tells him no, but when he expounds on "miraculous things", "phenomena of nature", Alex tells the therapist that he does indeed believe in God, even though he doesn't understand why God allowed Greg to die. Alex begins to accept Greg's death and realizes that he can keep Greg's memory alive by being more like him.

The staging of the entire second part is similar to the classic American play Our Town.

== Cast ==
- Michael J. Fox - Alex Keaton
- Michael Gross - Steven Keaton
- Meredith Baxter - Elyse Keaton
- Justine Bateman - Mallory Keaton
- Tina Yothers - Jennifer Keaton
- Brian Bonsall - Andy Keaton
- Scott Valentine - Nick Moore
- Marc Price - Irwin "Skippy" Handelman

=== Guest cast ===
- Brian McNamara - Greg McCormick
- Richard McGonagle - Brother Timothy (part 1 only)
- Meg Wyllie - Mrs. Leahy (part 2 only)
- David Wohl - The therapist (voice only)

== Production ==
The episode "My Name Is Alex" originally aired on NBC as a special one part episode and was promoted heavily by the network as "Commercial-free".

== Reception ==
=== Awards ===
The episode won the Primetime Emmy Award for Outstanding Writing for a Comedy Series at the 39th Primetime Emmy Awards, a Humanitas Prize for 60 Minute Network or Syndicated Television at the 13th annual ceremony held in 1987 and a Writers Guild of America Award for Best Screenplay - Episodic Comedy at the 40th annual Writers Guild of America Awards 1987 ceremony held in 1988 for writers Gary David Goldberg & Alan Uger. It also won the Directors Guild of America Award for Outstanding Directing – Comedy Series at the 40th Directors Guild of America Awards for director Will Mackenzie. It also earned a Primetime Emmy Award for Outstanding Directing for a Comedy Series nomination for Will Mackenzie. In addition it won an Outstanding Technical Direction/Electronic Camerawork/Video Control for a Series Emmy for Parker Roe (technical director), Paul Basta (cameraperson), Tom Dasbach (cameraperson), Richard Price (cameraperson), John Repczynski (cameraperson), and Eric Clay (senior video control).
