= Alex P. Keaton =

Fictional American TV series character

- Family Ties character
- First appearance: "Pilot" (episode 1.01)
- Last appearance: "Alex Doesn't Live Here Anymore" (episode 7.24)
- Created by: Gary David Goldberg
- Portrayed by: Michael J. Fox

In-universe information
- Gender: Male
- Family: Steven Keaton (father); Elyse Keaton (mother); Mallory Keaton (sister); Jennifer Keaton (sister); Andrew Keaton (brother)
- Significant others: Ellen Reed; Lauren Miller
- Nationality: American
- Political party: Republican

Alexander P. Keaton is a fictional character on the American television sitcom Family Ties, which aired on NBC for seven seasons, from 1982 to 1989. Family Ties reflected the move in the United States away from the cultural liberalism of the 1960s and 1970s to the conservatism of the 1980s. This was particularly expressed through the relationship between Young Republican Alex (Michael J. Fox) and his hippie parents, Steven (Michael Gross) and Elyse Keaton (Meredith Baxter).

== Character arc ==
=== Background ===
Alex P. Keaton (Michael J. Fox) is the oldest child of Steven and Elyse Keaton (Michael Gross and Meredith Baxter), who were baby boomers and Democrats during the early years of the Presidency of Ronald Reagan. Married in 1964, Steven, a manager in a local Public Broadcasting Service station and Elyse, an independent architect, were hippies during the 1960s. According to the episode "A Christmas Story" in season one, Alex was born in 1965 while his parents were on assignment in Africa, having been influenced by John F. Kennedy to participate in the Peace Corps. (While he often introduces himself as Alex P. Keaton, it is never revealed what the P stands for.) Alex has two younger sisters, Mallory (Justine Bateman) and Jennifer (Tina Yothers). Mallory was born while her parents were students at the University of California, Berkeley in 1967, Jennifer was born the night of Richard Nixon's presidential election in 1972 and a younger brother, Andrew, was born in 1985. The family lives in suburban Columbus, Ohio.

=== Storylines ===
At the beginning of the series, Alex is a high school student who has a passion for economics and wealth. In particular, he is an advocate of supply-side economics. His heroes are Richard Nixon (going so far as to have a lunchbox bearing Nixon's likeness), William F. Buckley Jr., Ronald Reagan, Gerald Ford and Milton Friedman. His favorite television show is Wall Street Week and he is an avid reader of The Wall Street Journal. He also enjoys music of the big band and swing era but secretly enjoys rock music (as seen in the episode "A, My Name is Alex"). Alex spends the first two seasons of the series preparing to attend Princeton University. While he is attending an on-campus interview, Mallory, who tagged along to pay a surprise visit to her boyfriend, Jeff, who is attending Princeton at the time, has an emotional breakdown when she finds Jeff is seeing another woman. Ultimately, Alex chooses to look after Mallory rather than complete his interview, thus destroying any possibility of attending the university and getting into the Ivy League.

Alex receives a scholarship to fictional Leland University, which is located close enough for him to continue to live at home and commute. Keaton excels at Leland and teaches an economics course as a teaching assistant. Alex holds a disdain for nearby Grant College (which Mallory later attends) and regularly openly mocks their courses. While attending Leland, he has two serious girlfriends. His first is artist/feminist, Ellen Reed (Tracy Pollan, whom Fox later married). After they break up, Keaton pursues a liberal psychology student with feminist inclinations, Lauren Miller, who is played by Courteney Cox. The relationship ends when he has an affair with music major Martie Brodie (played by Jane Adams) while Lauren is out of town. After graduation, Alex accepts a job on Wall Street (coinciding with the conclusion of the series).

=== Epilogue ===
When Michael J. Fox left his next series, Spin City, a decade after Family Ties, his final episodes as a regular ("Goodbye: Parts 1 & 2", Season 4, Episodes 25 and 26) made numerous allusions to Family Ties. Michael Gross (Alex's father Steven) portrays Michael Patrick Flaherty's (Michael J. Fox) therapist and there is a reference to the therapist's unseen receptionist named "Mallory". After Flaherty becomes an environmental lobbyist in Washington, he makes a reference to having met the junior senator from Ohio, Alex P. Keaton, adding, "What a stiff!" Actress Meredith Baxter, who played Alex Keaton's mother on Family Ties, also played Michael Flaherty's mother on Spin City.

== Reception and influence ==
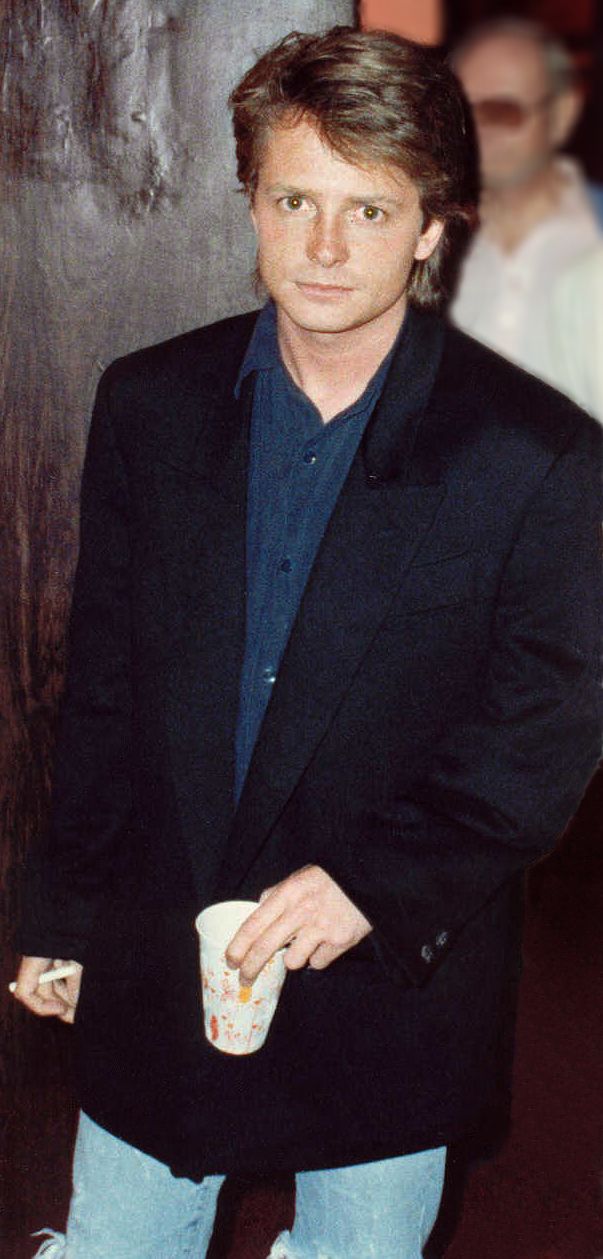
Fox in September 1987

The humor of the series focused on a real cultural divide during the 1980s, between the baby boomers and Generation X. According to Stephen Kiehl, this was when the "Alex Keaton generation was rejecting the counterculture of the 1960s and embracing the wealth and power that came to define the '80s." While the youngest, Jennifer (an athletic tomboy) shares the values of her parents, Alex and Mallory embrace Reaganomics and consequent conservative values: Alex is a Young Republican and Mallory is a more traditional young woman in contrast to her feminist mother.

In the Museum of Broadcast Communications' Encyclopedia of Television entry for Family Ties, Michael Saenz argues that:

Few shows better demonstrate the resonance between collectively held fictional imagination and what cultural critic Raymond Williams called "the structure of feeling" of a historical moment than Family Ties. Airing on NBC from 1982 to 1989, this highly successful domestic comedy explored one of the intriguing cultural inversions characterizing the Reagan era: a conservative younger generation aspiring to wealth, business success and traditional values, serves as inheritor to the politically liberal, presumably activist, culturally experimental generation of adults who had experienced the 1960s. The result was a decade, paradoxical by America's usual post–World War II standards, in which youthful ambition and social renovation became equated with pronounced political conservatism. "When else could a boy with a briefcase become a national hero?" queried Family Ties' creator, Gary David Goldberg, during the show's final year.

In 1999, TV Guide ranked Alex P. Keaton number 17 on its "50 Greatest TV Characters of All Time" list.

=== References in other media ===
Florida ska/punk band Victims of Circumstance's debut album, Roll the Dice, featured a track titled "Me and Alex P. Keaton". The lyrics parody a typical day spent with a modern, socially conservative Republican.

LFO's 1999 single "Summer Girls" name-checks "Alex P. Keaton" alongside many other cultural references.

In the Family Guy episode "Movin' Out (Brian's Song)", after Brian gets dumped by Jillian when he admits he did not want to move in with her, Stewie tries to help him get over her by comparing the situation to when Alex P. Keaton lost his own girlfriend before getting another one.

In the second episode of the first season of Broad City, when offered "a few pages from [his] dad's prescription pad" by a young boy, Abbi refers to him as Alex P. Keaton.

During the seventh episode of the third season of Stranger Things, while under the influence of "truth serum", Steve Harrington mistakenly refers to Marty McFly (another character played by Michael J. Fox) as Alex P. Keaton while trying to understand the plot of Back to the Future.

== Sources ==
- Fox, Michael J. (2002), Lucky Man: A Memoir, New York: Hyperion, ISBN 978-0-7868-6764-6
- Goldberg, Gary David. "Comedy Stop: What Would Alex Keaton Do?" The New York Times, March 3, 2008.
- Haglund, David. "Reagan's Favorite Sitcom: How Family Ties spawned a conservative hero". Slate. March 2, 2007.
- Hurst, Alex. "Remembering an icon from the 'Me-Decade'". The Daily Pennsylvanian, April 24, 2001.
- Patterson, Thomas. "What would Alex P. Keaton do?" CNN, November 1, 2006.
- Stewart, Susan. "The Parents Ate Sprouts; the Kid Stole the Show. The New York Times, February 25, 2007.
