= 40th Directors Guild of America Awards =

- Date: March 12, 1988
- Location: The Beverly Hilton, Los Angeles, California; Plaza Hotel, New York City
- Country: United States
- Presented by: Directors Guild of America

Highlights
- Best Director Feature Film: The Last Emperor – Bernardo Bertolucci
- Website: https://www.dga.org/Awards/History/1980s/1987.aspx?value=1987

The 40th Directors Guild of America Awards, honoring the outstanding directorial achievements in film and television in 1987, were presented on March 12, 1988 at the Beverly Hilton and the Plaza Hotel. The feature film nominees were announced on February 1, 1988 and nominees in eight television categories were announced on February 8, 1988.

== Winners and nominees ==
=== Film ===
Feature Film

Bernardo Bertolucci – The Last Emperor

- James L. Brooks – Broadcast News
- Lasse Hallström – My Life as a Dog
- Adrian Lyne – Fatal Attraction
- Steven Spielberg – Empire of the Sun

=== Television ===
Drama Series

Marshall Herskovitz – thirtysomething for "Pilot"

- Sharron Miller – Cagney & Lacey for "Turn, Turn, Turn (Part 1)"
- Mark Tinker – St. Elsewhere for "Weigh In, Weigh Out"
Comedy Series

Will Mackenzie – Family Ties for "A, My Name is Alex"

- James Burrows – Cheers for "Home Is the Sailor"
- Terry Hughes – The Golden Girls for "Old Friends"
Miniseries or TV Film

Jud Taylor – Foxfire

- Paul Bogart – Nutcracker: Money, Madness and Murder
- Marvin J. Chomsky – Billionaire Boys Club
Musical Variety

Dwight Hemion – Julie Andrews... The Sound Of Christmas

- Hal Gurnee – Late Night with David Letterman for "5th Anniversary Special"
- Don Mischer – Great Performances for "Made in USA with Mikhail Baryshnikov"
Daytime Drama

Victoria Hochberg – ABC Afterschool Special for "Just a Regular Kid: An AIDS Story"

- Nell Cox – ABC Afterschool Special for "Read Between the Lines"
- Joanna Lee – ABC Afterschool Special for "The Kid Who Wouldn't Quit: The Brad Silverman Story"
Documentary/Actuality

Elena Mannes – God and Politics for "The Kingdom Divided"

- John Peaslee and Judd Pillot – How To Raise a Street Smart Child
- Terry Sanders – Slow Fires: On the Preservation of the Human Record
Sports

Robert Fishman – 1987 NCAA Basketball Championship for "Syracuse vs. Indiana"

- Sandy Grossman – Super Bowl XXI
- Edward Nathanson – AFC Championship

=== Commercials ===
Commercials

Richard Levine – Pepsi's "Apartment 10-G", DuPont's "Bill Demby", and Arnott's Biscuits' "Trouble"

- Leslie Dektor – Drug Free America Foundation's "Girl & Dealer" and "Tricks of the Trade", and United Airlines' "Pep Talk"
- Robert Lieberman – Hallmark Cards' "40th Birthday" and McDonald's' "New Kid"
- Jeffrey Lovinger – American Express' "Recital", Little Caesars' "The Wisdom", and Aetna's "World Series"
- Joe Pytka – Perrier's "Continents", John Hancock Financial's "40th Birthday", and Apple's "I'm Different"

=== D.W. Griffith Award ===
- Robert Wise

=== Frank Capra Achievement Award ===
- Alex Hapsas

=== Robert B. Aldrich Service Award ===
- Sheldon Leonard

=== Honorary Life Member ===
- Michael H. Franklin
