= List of Family Ties episodes =

This is a list of episodes of the American television sitcom Family Ties, that aired on NBC from September 22, 1982 to May 14, 1989, with a total of 176 episodes produced, spanning 7 seasons.

== Series overview ==
Season	Episodes	Originally released		Rank	Rating
Season	Episodes	First released	Last released	Rank	Rating
1	22	September 22, 1982	April 4, 1983	56	—N/a
2	22	September 28, 1983	May 10, 1984	42	16.0
3	24	September 20, 1984	March 28, 1985	5	22.1
Film		September 23, 1985		—N/a	22.1
4	24	September 26, 1985	May 1, 1986	2	30.0
5	30	September 25, 1986	August 13, 1987	2	32.7
6	28	September 13, 1987	May 1, 1988	17	17.3
7	26	October 30, 1988	May 14, 1989	35	14.5

== Episodes ==
=== Season 1 (1982–1983) ===
- This is the only season where Michael Gross was clean shaven.

No. overall	No. in season	Title	Directed by	Written by	Original release date	Prod. code	Rating/share (households)
1	1	"Pilot"	Asaad Kelada	Gary David Goldberg	September 22, 1982	001	15.4/23
Alex escorts a pretty socialite to a dance at her country club.
2	2	"Not With My Sister You Don't"	Tony Mordente	Lloyd Garver	September 29, 1982	004	17.2/26
Alex heads the household when Elyse and Steven go away for the weekend.
3	3	"I Know Jennifer's Boyfriend"	Michael Zinberg	Gary David Goldberg	October 6, 1982	003	18.1/28
Jennifer gets picked on when she befriends a boy at school.
4	4	"Summer of '82"	Tony Mordente	Michael J. Weithorn	October 27, 1982	007	12.3/19
Seduced by an "older woman" of twenty-one (Amy Steel), the hitherto inexperienced Alex is devastated to learn that she thinks of their relationship as casual.
5	5	"I Never Killed for My Father"	Dick Martin	Kimberly Hill	November 3, 1982	008	16.7/26
A visit from Steven's father (John Randolph) evokes confrontation between the two.
6	6	"Give Your Uncle Arthur a Kiss"	Will Mackenzie	Lloyd Garver & Gary David Goldberg	November 10, 1982	012	15.1/23
Mallory is horrified and confused when a close family friend and older business associate of her father's makes a pass at her.
7	7	"Big Brother is Watching"	Alan Bergmann	Ruth Bennett	November 17, 1982	013	13.9/21
As the new editor of his school paper, Alex uncovers a cheating scandal and to everyone's chagrin, prints a list of students who were caught including Mallory.
8	8	"No Nukes Is Good Nukes"	Frank Bonner	Ruth Bennett	November 24, 1982	009	14.0/22
To the dismay of the Keaton children and their equally conservative grandparents (Dick Sargent and Priscilla Morrill), Steven and Elyse take time out Thanksgiving Day to attend an anti-nuke rally-and end up spending the holiday in jail.
9	9	"Death of a Grocer"	Will Mackenzie	Michael J. Weithorn	December 1, 1982	011	16.0/24
Though Alex loves working at Mr. Adler's "Mom and Pop" grocery store, to the old man's dismay, he quits to "climb the corporate ladder" at an ultramodern supermarket. Note: This episode marks the debut of Marc Price in the recurring role of Skippy Handleman.
10	10	"Have Gun, Will Unravel"	Alan Bergmann	Ruth Bennett	December 8, 1982	006	13.5/20
The Keatons consider buying a gun for protection after getting burglarized.
11	11	"A Christmas Story"	Will Mackenzie	Joanne Pagliaro	December 15, 1982	014	17.0/26
When a blizzard forces the Keatons to spend Christmas at home, Elyse's gift to Steven of an album filled with fascinating old photos sparks flashbacks to the births of their three children.
12	12	"Oops"	Tony Mordente	Joanne Pagliaro	December 22, 1982	005	15.8/26
Mallory resents Elyse for the advice she gives her pregnant friend.
13	13	"Sherry Baby"	Tony Mordente	Barbara Hall	January 12, 1983	015	14.5/21
When popular sorority girl Sherry Marshall befriends Mallory to get close to Alex, Mallory brings them together in hopes of joining Pi Nu but her plan backfires.
14	14	"The Fugitive, Part 1"	Will Mackenzie	Michael J. Weithorn	January 19, 1983	016	14.6/22
Elyse's younger brother and Alex's idol, Ned (Tom Hanks), makes a surprise visit. However, everyone is puzzled by the go-getter corporate executive's suspicious behavior.
15	15	"The Fugitive, Part 2"	Will Mackenzie	Michael J. Weithorn	January 26, 1983	017	16.6/24
With the FBI hot on Ned's heels for embezzling 4.5 million dollars in corporate funds, Elyse's ethical brother and Alex's idol tells the family why and where he hid the money.
16	16	"Margin of Error"	Tony Mordente	Michael Russnow	February 9, 1983	018	12.8/18
Alex amasses a bundle by playing the stock market on paper for his economics class, and courts disaster by secretly investing his father's money.
17	17	"French Lessons"	Tony Mordente	Ruth Bennett	February 16, 1983	019	13.7/20
Mallory's handsome but shy French tutor, Jeff, finally musters up the nerve to ask her out and then courts disaster by enlisting Alex's advice on how to behave on the date.
18	18	"I Gotta Be Ming"	Sam Weisman	Douglas Wyman	February 23, 1983	020	12.6/18
As Big Brother to a 10-year-old Vietnamese boy, Alex tries to mold Ming into his own image, and he learns an unforgettable lesson when he breaks a promise to the adoring child.
19	19	"Suzanne Takes You Down"	Will Mackenzie	Ruth Bennett	March 16, 1983	010	17.0/25
Soon after freelance architect Elyse Keaton hires her friend Suzanne Davis to handle clerical chores, she wants to fire the under-qualified, overly aggressive secretary.
20	20	"The Fifth Wheel"	Andrew McCullough	Ruth Bennett & Michael J. Weithorn	March 28, 1983	022	14.3/20
Alex gets stuck babysitting for his little sister Jennifer, who is fed up with feeling in the way at his poker game and decides to disappear.
21	21	"Stage Fright"	Sam Weisman	Ruth Bennett & Michael J. Weithorn	April 4, 1983	021	13.9/20
While gearing up to face the television cameras as captain of his high school's team on "Quiz-Em", Alex panics at first when a teammate drops out and then launches a tutoring program a la Eliza Doolittle for his sister Mallory.
22	22	"Elyse D'Arc"	Michael Zinberg	Michael J. Weithorn	April 11, 1983	002	13.2/19
Elyse gets so wrapped up in work that she neglects her family.

=== Season 2 (1983–1984) ===
No. overall	No. in season	Title	Directed by	Written by	Original release date	Prod. code	Rating/share (households)
23	1	"Tender is the Knight"	Sam Weisman	Ruth Bennett	September 28, 1983	023	15.7/24
When pretty Carrie Newman and her mother Julia come to visit the Keatons, Carrie's forward behavior sends Alex into a panic. Note: First episode featuring a bearded Steven Keaton which he will keep for the remainder of the series. Michael Gross had grown the beard between seasons 1 and 2 while appearing in a Broadway production.
24	2	"The Homecoming"	Sam Weisman	Douglas Wyman	October 12, 1983	027	16.1/23
When Mallory's boyfriend Jeff arrives home from college and wants to go steady, she's elated, but it's soon apparent that he's a little awed by school and merely grasping at the familiar.
25	3	"The Harder They Fall"	Sam Weisman	Rich Reinhart	October 19, 1983	026	16.2/26
Alex anxiously awaits a crucial college recommendation from his English teacher (Edward Edwards).
26	4	"This Year's Model"	John Pasquin	Susan Borowitz & Richard Raskind	October 26, 1983	032	17.7/28
Mallory secretly submits a picture of Elyse and herself to an ad agency for a mother-daughter-modeling contest.
27	5	"Not An Affair to Remember"	Sam Weisman	Ruth Bennett & Gary David Goldberg	November 2, 1983	029	17.5/26
Steven's assistant (Judith Light) at the station is bright, talented, funny, and witty...and in love with him.
28	6	"Speed Trap"	Sam Weisman	Michael J. Weithorn	November 9, 1983	025	16.1/24
When Alex takes diet pills for a lift during midterms, his dependency level increases daily.
29	7	"Sweet Lorraine"	Sam Weisman	Alan Uger	November 16, 1983	031	13.9/21
While working as a DJ at the school radio station, Alex strikes up a telephone friendship with caller Lorraine Ferrar (Carolyn Seymour).
30	8	"Batter Up"	Sam Weisman	Lisa A. Bannick	November 30, 1983	028	16.1/24
Steven and Elyse worry that Jennifer's softball team coach is pushing the girls too hard.
31	9	"A Keaton Christmas Carol"	Will Mackenzie	Story by : Robert Caplain; Teleplay by : Rich Reinhart	December 14, 1983	037	18.0/27
A cynical Alex finds the spirit of Christmas in a dream.
32	10	"To Snatch a Keith"	Sam Weisman	Alan Uger	December 21, 1983	024	16.9/26
Steven and Elyse realize how lucky they are when their friends come over for a visit, but are unaware that it will be for the last time.
33	11	"Birthday Boy"	Will Mackenzie	Michael J. Weithorn	January 5, 1984	033	16.4/24
On his 18th birthday, Alex defies his mother and goes off with some of his buddies to celebrate at an out-of-town nightclub. Notes: Michael J. Fox and Crispin Glover would later star in Back to the Future together. John Putch also previously guest starred in the episode "Summer of '82" as the character Pete.
34	12	"Go Tigers"	Will Mackenzie	Michael J. Weithorn	January 12, 1984	036	16.2/24
Alex is both amazed and furious when a critical admissions interview at Princeton University is shattered by his hysterical sister Mallory.
35	13	""M" is for the Many Things"	Will Mackenzie	Lisa A. Bannick	January 19, 1984	038	16.0/23
Elyse is shocked by her soon-to-be-divorced mother's quick and free-spirited plunge into the singles world.
36	14	"Say Uncle"	Will Mackenzie	Ruth Bennett	January 26, 1984	039	17.5/26
Alex discovers that his idol, young Uncle Ned, has a serious drinking problem.
37	15	"Ladies' Man"	John Pasquin	Alan Uger	February 2, 1984	040	11.6/17
Alex pretends to support the Equal Rights Amendment to impress a pretty feminist.
38	16	"Ready or Not"	Lee Shallat	Ruth Bennett & Michael J. Weithorn	February 9, 1984	041	17.9/26
Mallory turns to Alex for some advice when she begins to fear she'll lose her new boyfriend unless she agrees to his pleas for a more "adult" romance.
39	17	"Double Date"	Will Mackenzie	Douglas Wyman	February 16, 1984	044	16.3/23
Alex courts disaster when he invites two dates to the senior prom. He devises an elaborate scheme for escorting each of the unknowing girls on a night to remember.
40	18	"Lady Sings the Blues"	Andrew McCullough	Alan Uger & Michael J. Weithorn	February 23, 1984	042	14.6/22
Elyse is excited at the prospect of reviving her folk-singing career at a local nightclub.
41	19	"Baby Boy Doe"	Will Mackenzie	Ruth Bennett & Alan Uger	March 8, 1984	045	14.9/22
When Alex's pal Skippy discovers he's adopted, Alex helps him cope with the shocking news.
42	20	"The Graduate"	Will Mackenzie	Ruth Bennett & Lloyd Garver	March 15, 1984	043	16.9/26
Alex is so sure that he will be named valedictorian of his class that he can't cope with the thought of being defeated by a girl-especially his girl.
43	21	"Diary of a Young Girl"	Sam Weisman	Ruth Bennett	May 3, 1984	034	11.3/18
In the hospital awaiting a tonsillectomy, Jennifer fears she may never see her family again.
44	22	"Working At It"	Sam Weisman	Lloyd Garver	May 10, 1984	030	11.8/21
Elyse feels the need to expand her horizons.

=== Season 3 (1984–1985) ===
No. overall	No. in season	Title	Directed by	Written by	Original release date	Prod. code	Rating/share (households)
45	1	"The Gambler"	Will Mackenzie	Alan Uger & Michael J. Weithorn	September 20, 1984	046	17.5/30
Elyse is stricken with gambling fever on a business trip to Atlantic City. While on a roll with Alex's "foolproof" blackjack system, she's oblivious to her family and job. Note: This episode was produced during Season 2.
46	2	"Here We Go Again"	Will Mackenzie	Ruth Bennett & Alan Uger	September 27, 1984	047	20.1/32
The news that their mother is pregnant sends the three Keaton kids into an angry outburst resulting in a family battle.
47	3	"Little Man on Campus"	John Pasquin	Michael J. Weithorn	October 4, 1984	050	21.0/32
Alex is thrilled to be taking a college course taught by one of his personal heroes, Professor Ephraim Bronski. In his eagerness to impress the teacher he gets off to a bad start and is humiliated by his idol when he fails the first class assignment. Note: Michael McGuire as 'Professor Bronski' and Timothy Busfield as 'Doug' appear as guest stars in this episode.
48	4	"Love Thy Neighbor"	Will Mackenzie	Story by : Rich Reinhart; Teleplay by : Alan Uger & Michael J. Weithorn	October 11, 1984	054	19.1/30
Little Jennifer is thrilled about getting a visit from her former neighborhood pal, Scott, whom she hasn't seen in five years. Note: This is the first episode that Meredith Baxter does not appear in due to her pregnancy.
49	5	"Keaton and Son"	Will Mackenzie	Lissa Levin	October 18, 1984	052	19.3/29
Alex reluctantly accepts a part-time job with his father at the non-profit station, and his dad is bursting with pride to have him following in his footsteps. Note: Second episode that Meredith Baxter does not appear in due to her pregnancy.
50	6	"Fabric Smarts"	Will Mackenzie	Lloyd Garver	October 25, 1984	048	20.2/31
Mallory's enthusiasm for her part-time job at a boutique causes her grades to slip even lower than usual.
51	7	"Hotline Fever"	John Pasquin	Marc Lawrence	November 1, 1984	055	17.2/26
As an economics student, Alex finds it demeaning to be forced into a public service position, but his experiences at the crisis center gives him a new outlook on life. Note: Third episode that Meredith Baxter does not appear in due to her pregnancy.
52	8	"4 Rms Ocn Vu"	Lee Shallat	Alan Uger & Marc Lawrence	November 8, 1984	057	18.6/28
While Steven and Elyse are away on vacation, Mallory accidentally crashes her parents' car into a telephone pole. In order to raise the money they need for repairs, the Keaton kids convert their residence into a hotel. Their timing couldn't be better, since this happens to be Homecoming Week at Ohio State University. Soon, Mallory and her siblings have enough cash to fix ten cars. But when Steven returns home early, hospitality at "Keaton Manor" comes to an abrupt and unceremonious halt. Note: Fourth episode that Meredith Baxter does not appear in due to her pregnancy.
53	9	"Best Man"	John Pasquin	Alan Uger	November 15, 1984	051	22.3/34
Alex cannot accept the fact that he and everyone around him are growing up, and desperately clings to his old ways. Note: Lily Mariye guest stars in this episode as Eleanor, to whom Doug (Timothy Busfield) wants to wed. Also Tate Donovan appears as 'Clancy' one of Alex & Doug's poker friends.
54	10	"Lost Weekend"	Will Mackenzie	Ruth Bennett & Michael J. Weithorn	November 22, 1984	049	15.3/28
Steven and Elyse plan a nostalgic weekend with the kids before the baby arrives, and are crushed to discover that the children are not at all interested in reminiscing about old times-they'd rather be with their friends.
55	11	"Don't Kiss Me, I'm Only the Messenger"	Will Mackenzie	Ruth Bennett	November 29, 1984	053	21.5/32
Alex plays Cupid to help his shy pal Skippy get together with Jane, the girl of his dreams, but his good intentions go awry when the girl falls for him instead. Note: Michelle Meyrink guest stars in this episode as 'Jane', Mallory's friend, and Skippy's latest infatuation.
56	12	"Help Wanted"	Will Mackenzie	Ruth Bennett & Michael J. Weithorn	December 6, 1984	056	21.7/32
Alex hires an attractive housekeeper Karen Nicholson (Geena Davis) with no experience who meets his special criteria. Note: Fifth episode that Meredith Baxter does not appear in due to her pregnancy.
57	13	"Karen II, Alex 0"	Lee Shallat	Lloyd Garver & Michael J. Weithorn	December 13, 1984	058	19.9/31
Alex's chances for acceptance into a smug college fraternity are dependent upon him having a knockout date for the pledge dance. Notes: Robert Pine and Christopher Rydell are guest stars in this episode. Sixth episode that Meredith Baxter does not appear in due to her pregnancy.
58	14	"Oh Donna"	Will Mackenzie	Alan Uger	January 3, 1985	060	21.2/30
Alex is a stand-in at a Lamaze class for pregnant, single, college students. Alex's natural over-enthusiasm gets the best of him as he envisions nurturing a relationship with a girl named Donna (Isabelle Walker) and her unborn child, and leading it into marriage and a family. It takes Elyse to set him straight ... and even alert him to the possibility that Donna may not want to keep the baby. Note: David Paymer & Julie Fulton appear as couple 'Larry & 'Suzie Harris' as guest stars in this episode. Also Jack Blessing & Karlene Crockett appear as couple 'Leonard & Marge' expecting twins.
59	15	"Auntie Up"	John Pasquin	Lawrence H. Levy	January 10, 1985	059	22.3/30
Mallory's beloved Aunt Trudy (Edith Atwater) suffers a fatal heart attack. Mallory falls into a deep depression, but matters are compounded when the family brushes her off to tend to what they feel are more important matters. Note: Seventh episode that Meredith Baxter does not appear in due to her pregnancy.
60	16	"Philadelphia Story"	Will Mackenzie	Michael J. Weithorn	January 17, 1985	061	23.9/34
While doing a term paper for history class on colonial times, Alex suffers from a cold and falls asleep. In a dream, Alex becomes a Philadelphia stable boy who, with his friend Skipford (Marc Price in character as Skippy), experience the events leading to the signing of the Declaration of Independence. Michael Gross doubles as a Steven Keaton-inspired Thomas Jefferson. Note: James Cromwell as 'John Hancock' and Ben Piazza as both 'John Adams' and 'Ed Nelson' appear as guest stars in this episode.
61	17	"Birth of a Keaton, Part 1"	Will Mackenzie	Lloyd Garver	January 24, 1985	062	22.2/32
It's Pledge Week again at Steven's TV station but Alex, Mallory and Jennifer are not very enthusiastic about it this year. But after Steven is called home to deal with plumbing problems, Elyse performs on-air...and then goes into labor. Note: John Hancock as 'Gus' and Ron Karabatsos as 'Bud' the plumber, appear both as guest stars in this episode.
62	18	"Birth of a Keaton, Part 2"	Will Mackenzie	Alan Uger & Marc Lawrence	January 31, 1985	063	25.9/36
With Steven, Skippy, and the plumber stuck in the massive snowstorm, Elyse remains at the TV station in the final stages of labor. Note: In addition to the aforementioned guest actors of the former episode, Shirley Prestia and William Cort as 'Dr.Witt', appear as guest stars in this second part of the episode.
63	19	"Cry Baby"	Sam Weisman	Bruce David & Bruce Helford	February 7, 1985	064	22.5/32
Newborn Andrew's arrival has been hard on the Keatons, with everyone going without sleep. Jennifer has taken the bundle of joy the hardest, eventually screaming that she hates Andrew and wishes he had never been born. Now the family have to decide how they can properly balance their time with Andrew and not alienate Jennifer. Finally realizing that she had done wrong, Jennifer apologises and ends up starting to get used to living with Andrew.
64	20	"Don't Know Much About History..."	Sam Weisman	Marc Lawrence & Michael J. Weithorn	February 14, 1985	065	24.5/36
Rival tutors Alex & James (Jeffrey Joseph) both fall for an attractive student (Nancy Everhard) they are tutoring. Their ill will toward one another explodes at a poetry reading, and they continue to verbally spar.
65	21	"Bringing Up Baby"	Andrew McCullough	Rich Reinhart	February 21, 1985	067	24.3/35
With two careers, three bickering children and one demanding baby, Steven and Elyse can't seem to find any time for each other. But when they do finally take the time for a quiet evening alone, they find out that they actually miss all of the chaos. Note: Steven Peterman and Radha Delamarter appear in this episode as guest stars as the 'couple with a baby' in the restaurant.
66	22	"Cold Storage"	Lee Shallat	Marc Lawrence	March 7, 1985	066	25.4/38
Skippy accidentally locks himself in the basement with Mallory while the rest of the Keatons are away visiting some of the acquaintances made at their past Lamaze classes. Mallory clashes at first over Skippy's unrequited feelings for her, but soon she realizes that, despite his quirks, he has been a kind and good friend to her. Note: In this episode appear again as guest stars David Paymer & Julie Fulton as couple 'Larry & 'Suzie Harris' and Jack Blessing & Karlene Crockett as the couple with twins 'Leonard & Marge'.
67	23	"Remembrances of Things Past"	Sam Weisman	Gary David Goldberg & Alan Uger	March 28, 1985	068	24.7/37
68	24	"Remembrances of Things Past"	Sam Weisman	Gary David Goldberg & Alan Uger	March 28, 1985	069	24.7/37
Part 1: The Keatons visit Grandma, who has put her house up for sale now that Grandpa has died. But Steven's unresolved issues with his father continue to haunt him. Part 2: Steven and his brother disagree about whether to accept the offer on their mother's house. Meanwhile, Steven visits his father's grave in order to make peace.

=== Film (1985) ===
- The television film Family Ties Vacation aired three days before the start of season four. The film was later split into four individual episodes when the series entered syndication.

Title	Directed by	Written by	Original release date	Rating/share (households)
Family Ties Vacation	Will Mackenzie	Gary David Goldberg & Michael J. Weithorn & Alan Uger & Marc Lawrence	September 23, 1985	22.1/33
The Keatons take a vacation to the United Kingdom where Alex takes classes at the University of Oxford, having won a summer scholarship. While Alex struggles with fitting in and Mallory falls for his dormitory roommate William Clive-Hopkins (John Moulder-Brown), the family gets mixed up in international intrigue.

=== Season 4 (1985–1986) ===
No. overall	No. in season	Title	Directed by	Written by	Original release date	Prod. code	Rating/share (households)
69	1	"The Real Thing, Part 1"	Will Mackenzie	Michael J. Weithorn	September 26, 1985	074	29.6/45
College Sophomore Alex dates a cute freshman he spotted in the school catalogue, but ends up falling for her roommate, Ellen Reed (Tracy Pollan), instead. In 2009, TV Guide ranked this episode #76 on its list of the 100 Greatest Episodes.
70	2	"The Real Thing, Part 2"	Will Mackenzie	Michael J. Weithorn	October 3, 1985	075	28.9/44
With encouragement from Elyse, Alex travels to Lancaster, Pennsylvania to tell Ellen how he feels, even though she has gone there to elope with her boyfriend.
71	3	"Mr. Wrong"	Will Mackenzie	Alan Uger	October 17, 1985	073	28.1/43
Mallory brings home her new boyfriend, Nick Moore (Scott Valentine), who looks to be exactly the type of guy Steven and Elyse hoped their daughter wouldn't get involved with.
72	4	"Designated Hitter"	John Pasquin	Stephen J. Curwick	October 24, 1985	070	26.7/39
Jennifer defends her boyfriend (Noah Hathaway) from the attacks of a bully (Danny Nucci) with complications. In the subplot, Alex is devastated when Mallory scores higher than he does on an IQ test. Note: This episode was produced during Season 3.
73	5	"Don't Go Changin'"	Asaad Kelada	Marc Lawrence	October 31, 1985	079	26.3/39
Alex tries to change his personality to impress Ellen's artsy & dancing friends. As a subplot, Steven balks at having to go to Elyse's book club meetings during football games.
74	6	"The Old College Try"	Barbara Schultz	Ruth Bennett	November 7, 1985	076	28.9/41
Mallory upsets Elyse when she announces that she is not going to college.
75	7	"My Tutor"	Sam Weisman	Jace Richdale	November 14, 1985	080	29.5/43
To help him with math, Alex hires a tutor who he later learns is a fourteen-year-old named Eugene (River Phoenix). Eugene then falls for the younger Jennifer. However, he soon realizes it's a mistake when Jennifer acts her age and embarrasses him at a party. The subplot has Steven working tirelessly on the family budget.
76	8	"Mr. Right"	Sam Weisman	Alan Uger	November 21, 1985	081	32.4/46
Nick decides that he wants to impress Steven and Elyse and enlists the help of Alex, who turns Nick into a clone of himself.
77	9	"Just One Look"	Andrew McCullough	Story by : Paul Wolff; Teleplay by : Gary David Goldberg & Michael J. Weithorn	December 5, 1985	082	31.2/46
Steven's old college buddy Richard Schofield (Robert Desiderio) comes to town. Steven then learns that Elyse and Richard were previously in a relationship, which sends him into a jealous rage.
78	10	"How Do You Sleep?"	John Pasquin	Marc Lawrence	December 12, 1985	083	32.6/48
Alex has trouble sleeping, and his problems affect the whole family, much to their displeasure. Note: This is the fifth episode of the sitcom where its opening title sequence got moved for after the first scene of the episode and not used as its opening sequence. (Not counting the cold opening sequences as follow up of episodes split in two)
79	11	"You've Got a Friend"	John Pasquin	Ruth Bennett	December 19, 1985	085	29.8/46
Alex and Mallory catch a young girl, Jessie (Martha Plimpton), stealing from the store where Mallory works, Mallory turns her in and then later decides to help the girl and befriend her. However, Jessie may not be ready to accept Mallory's offer.
80	12	"Nothing But a Man"	Will Mackenzie	Story by : Jurgen M. Wolf; Teleplay by : Jean Kraynak Brinck	January 2, 1986	086	31.2/44
Steven gets a long awaited promotion at the TV station, but his long work hours cause him to miss dinners (and just about everything else) with the family, even private time with Elyse. Meanwhile, Alex is dismayed when the only toy Andy will play with is a doll Ellen gave him. (Robert Costanzo, George Coe and John Hancock are the guest stars in this episode)
81	13	"The Disciple"	Will Mackenzie	Rich Reinhart	January 9, 1986	089	32.4/48
Jennifer asks Alex for help with her social studies class oral report, but Alex's intellect takes over the whole assignment, so that Jennifer's school is very impressed with the finished project but Jennifer does not understand a word of it herself. Note: David Wohl as lawyer Ralph Boswell and Belita Moreno as Jennifer's teacher Mrs. Pedroza, appear as guest stars in this episode. Also Corey Feldman and Amy O'Neill appear as some of the students at Jennifer's school.
82	14	"Where's Poppa?"	Will Mackenzie	Susan Borowitz & Marc Lawrence	January 16, 1986	090	34.8/49
Alex sets up a reunion with Ellen and her father, Franklin Reed (Ronny Cox), who was absent for most of Ellen's childhood.
83	15	"Fool for Love"	Lee Shallat	Marc Lawrence	January 23, 1986	091	30.3/44
Skippy refuses to let go of feelings for Mallory, despite her dating Nick. (Jerry Hardin appears as guest star in this episode as Mr. Bidney.)
84	16	"Checkmate"	Sam Weisman	Michael J. Weithorn	January 30, 1986	092	32.9/47
Alex competes in the Chess match finals against Russia's top player, Ivan Rozmirovich (Albert Macklin). However, things start to go awry when Alex figures out that his opponent is attempting to throw the match. Note: Alex Henteloff as the Russian Coach and Elsa Raven as Mildred Atkins one of the juries, appear as guest stars in this episode.
85	17	"Engine Trouble"	John Pasquin	Ruth Bennett	February 6, 1986	093	32.4/46
When Alex and Elyse have to walk home after the car breaks down, they decide they should take a class in mechanics, but Alex soon turns it into a battle of the sexes. Meanwhile, Steven continuously denies that he is ill, although it clearly shows.
86	18	"A Word to the Wise"	Will Mackenzie	Susan Borowitz & Marc Lawrence	February 13, 1986	087	30.0/42
87	19	"A Word to the Wise"	Will Mackenzie	Susan Borowitz & Marc Lawrence	February 13, 1986	088	30.0/42
Part 1: As Alex and Ellen celebrate their six-month anniversary, the Keatons regale Ellen with stories about Alex's past schemes. Part 2: After Ellen hears many wild stories about Alex, Alex begins to wonder whether she still wants to be his girlfriend.
88	20	"Art Lover"	Andrew McCullough	Bruce Helford	February 20, 1986	094	31.3/46
Mallory becomes suspicious when a wealthy and beautiful older woman (Christine Belford) takes a special interest in Nick's artistic creations.
89	21	"Teacher's Pet"	John Pasquin	Marc Lawrence	March 2, 1986	095	15.6/23
Alex gets a position as an assistant professor at the college and convinces Ellen to enroll in the class that he is teaching. In the subplot, Steven wants to enroll a too-young Andrew into preschool, which Elyse opposes.
90	22	"My Buddy"	Sam Weisman	Alan Uger	March 6, 1986	096	33.0/48
Steven has to learn to accept that Jennifer is growing up. The only way he can get any time with her is to take her to her Sunflower Girls meeting, where he sticks out like a sore thumb. Meanwhile, Alex goes out early on a Saturday to fight a traffic ticket he feels he didn't deserve. Note: Miriam Flynn in the role of Mrs. Carpenter and Anne Marie McEvoy as Alice, appear as guest stars in this episode.
91	23	"Once in Love with Elyse"	Sam Weisman	Michael J. Weithorn	May 1, 1986	097	28.5/45
Elyse must deal with Paul (Peter Scolari), a young architect associate who has fallen in love with her.
92	24	"Paper Chase"	Sam Weisman	Susan Borowitz	May 8, 1986	098	27.5/46
Mallory faces the possibility of not graduating high school unless she passes a tough final oral exam taken by 'Mrs. Hillman' (Gracie Harrison) her strict history teacher. Note: This was the last episode featuring Tracy Pollan as Ellen Reed, although she will appear in the season 5 2-part episode "It's My Party", which was originally produced for Season 4.

=== Season 5 (1986–1987) ===
No. overall	No. in season	Title	Directed by	Written by	Original release date	Prod. code	Rating/share (households)
93	1	"Be True to Your Preschool"	Sam Weisman	Marc Lawrence	September 25, 1986	100	32.1/50
Steven and Elyse enroll 3-year-old Andrew in preschool, but it soon becomes clear that Alex objects to the school's values of sharing and cooperation. Note: This is Brian Bonsall's first appearance as Andrew Keaton.
94	2	"Starting Over"	Steven Robman	Alan Vejar	October 2, 1986	103	33.4/51
Ellen breaks up with Alex in order to take a scholarship in dancing she won at a prestigious Arts School in Paris, France. Distraught, Alex tries to cope with the breakup by re-entering the dating scene way too soon and meeting with Sharon (Haviland Morris) a girl he never noticed before and who he tries to make look like Ellen as much as possible.
95	3	"The Freshman and the Senior"	Sam Weisman	Ruth Bennett & Marc Lawrence	October 9, 1986	104	31.0/46
Mallory is teamed with 66-year-old Margaret Hollings (Julie Harris) on a college sociology project. Meanwhile, Alex is very interested to know what Steven and Elyse have written in their wills.
96	4	"My Back Pages"	Sam Weisman	Ruth Bennett	October 16, 1986	099	34.9/52
Steven's old college roommate comes for a visit and reveals he wants to re-launch their old magazine.
97	5	"Beauty and the Bank"	Asaad Kelada	Stephen J. Curwick	October 30, 1986	105	33.2/49
Alex gets his dream job at the Harding Trust, only to find out his boss is an attractive woman named Rebecca Ryan (Melinda Culea). (Named on the episode credits as Debra Ryan)
98	6	"Mrs. Wrong, Part 1"	Sam Weisman	Alan Uger	November 6, 1986	101	35.2/50
Mallory is overwhelmed with all her obligations at school and at home, so she decides the best way to get out of them is to marry her boyfriend, Nick.
99	7	"Mrs. Wrong, Part 2"	Sam Weisman	Alan Uger	November 13, 1986	102	34.6/49
Nick and Mallory set out to elope, but not without waking everyone up. Now it's up to Alex to track them down at the justice of the peace.
100	8	"The Big Fix"	John Pasquin	Michael J. Weithorn	November 17, 1986	084	24.5/35
Elyse plays matchmaker when she tries to fix up a lonely colleague with her neighbor's daughter Liz Obeck (Terry Farrell). Note: The 100th episode of the series. This episode was produced during Season 4.
101	9	"My Brother's Keeper"	Asaad Kelada	Susan Borowitz	November 20, 1986	107	32.0/46
Alex gets Skippy an interview with the Grant chapter of his fraternity, only to find out they plan to make Skippy the butt of a humiliating practical joke.
102	10	"High School Confidential"	Mark W. Travis	Ruth Bennett	December 4, 1986	112	36.4/54
In order to teach an art class at the local youth center, Nick must get his high school diploma with help from Alex and Mallory.
103	11	"Paper Lion"	Peter Baldwin	Wendy Aaron	December 11, 1986	106	33.7/51
Alex works on an important paper with his Economics professor, only to find out that their hypothesis is wrong. His professor goes ahead with plans to present the paper anyway.
104	12	"My Mother, My Friend"	Lynn Hamrick	Kate Boutilier	December 18, 1986	113	33.1/50
Mallory brings home Allison (Robin Morse) a friend studying an Architecture's major, and who has more in common with Elyse than Mallory herself. Mallory then becomes jealous of the attention her mom lavishes on the girl. Alex plays Scrabble with his game-obsessed Dad, Steven.
105	13	"Oh, Brother, Part 1"	Sam Weisman	Alan Uger	January 8, 1987	108	36.4/52
The Keatons are stunned when Uncle Rob visits and announces he's separated from his wife Maureen - and has already met someone else.
106	14	"Oh, Brother, Part 2"	Sam Weisman	Alan Uger	January 15, 1987	109	36.6/52
Rob's estranged wife Maureen shows up to tell the real story behind their separation. Although Rob stays single, he and Steve finally bond as brothers.
107	15	"Higher Love"	Debbie Allen	Susan Borowitz	January 22, 1987	116	39.2/53
Mallory begins to fall for the leader of her poetry group.
108	16	"Architect's Apprentice"	Steven Robman	David Tyron King	January 29, 1987	117	36.0/51
Nick convinces Steven to let him enter a contest to pick the sculpture for the newly remodelled lobby of WKS.
109	17	"A Tale of Two Cities, Part 1"	Peter Baldwin	Marc Lawrence & Alan Uger	February 5, 1987	114	36.4/52
While the Keaton kitchen gets remodelled, Alex and his boss, Rebecca, travel to Chicago for a conference, where they're forced to share a tiny room.
110	18	"A Tale of Two Cities, Part 2"	Peter Baldwin	Marc Lawrence & Alan Uger	February 12, 1987	115	36.2/54
Nervous about meeting her boss, Rebecca gets drunk and makes a fool of herself. Back at home, Steven refuses all help and wallpapers the kitchen himself.
111	19	"Battle of the Sexes"	Andrew McCullough & Sam Weisman	Stephen J. Curwick	February 19, 1987	110	32.4/46
112	20	"Battle of the Sexes"	Andrew McCullough & Sam Weisman	Stephen J. Curwick	February 19, 1987	111	32.4/46
Part 1: Elyse, Mallory and Jennifer confront Steven and Alex after a disastrous dinner at a restaurant, and past incidents are recalled where gender played a role in their lives. Part 2: Alex continues to defend and debate his chauvinistic ways, citing Mallory's and Jennifer's past experiences. But in the end, they decide he's not so bad after all.
113	21	"Band on the Run"	Andrew McCullough	Susan Borowitz & Marc Lawrence	February 26, 1987	118	35.4/51
Jennifer and her band, The Permanent Waves, try out for the homecoming dance at Leland College. They do so well Alex sees a chance to make money, and convinces them to let him be their manager.
114	22	"Keaton vs. Keaton"	Sam Weisman	Stephen J. Curwick	March 5, 1987	123	34.8/51
Alex and Mallory compete for a new $2,500 WKS scholarship.
115	23	"A, My Name is Alex"	Will Mackenzie	Gary David Goldberg & Alan Uger	March 12, 1987	119	36.0/52
116	24	"A, My Name is Alex"	Will Mackenzie	Gary David Goldberg & Alan Uger	March 12, 1987	120	36.0/52
Part 1: When his friend Greg is killed in a car accident, Alex behaves erratically after the funeral. Eventually grief sets in, and he questions his own existence. Part 2: Now in therapy to deal with Greg's death, Alex talks about many episodes from his childhood - and his true feelings about his family. Notes: This episode won the 1987 Primetime Emmy Award for Outstanding Writing for a Comedy Series. In 1997, TV Guide ranked this it number 68 on its '100 Greatest Episodes of All Time' list.
117	25	""D" is for Date"	Sam Weisman	Susan Borowitz	March 19, 1987	122	19.3/32
Jennifer plays dumb in order to date a good-looking jock named Tim (Wil Wheaton).
118	26	"Love Me Do"	Sam Weisman	Marc Lawrence	April 30, 1987	121	30.8/50
Skippy falls in love with Amy, a friend of Mallory's. Meanwhile, Steven plans a surprise birthday party for Elyse.
119	27	"The Visit"	Sam Weisman	Marc Lawrence & Alan Uger	May 7, 1987	124	27.8/46
Elyse's sister Michelle, her obnoxious husband (Stuart Pankin), and their bratty children come for a visit, and despite Steven's attempts to tolerate their presence, it eventually becomes too much. Note: The obnoxious son is played by Jeff Cohen, who previously played the annoying kid with the clapping hands hat in the episode "4 Rms Ocn Vu".
120	28	"Matchmaker"	Barbara Schultz	Bruce David & Bruce Helford	July 23, 1987	072	22.4/43
Mallory—having recently broken up with Rick (rather than Nick, this episode was filmed 2 years prior and breaks continuity)—comes home after yet another disastrous date. Alex, determined to get Mallory to forget Rick and find her a boyfriend, uses Jennifer's computer to snare the perfect guy. But how will Alex respond when Mallory doesn't like the guy the computer chooses for her? Note: This episode was produced during Season 3.
121	29	"It's My Party, Part 1"	Asaad Kelada	Susan Borowitz	August 6, 1987	077	19.5/37
Jennifer invites the trendiest—and shallowest—girls in school to her 13th birthday party. However, the party proves lame by their standards; so the cool kids leave...and Jennifer goes with them. Note: This episode was produced during Season 4 and therefore breaks continuity.
122	30	"It's My Party, Part 2"	Asaad Kelada	Susan Borowitz	August 13, 1987	078	20.3/37
Now part of her school's "In" crowd, Jennifer becomes fluent in valleyspeak while spending most of her time at the mall and/or partying. However, Jennifer's parents draw the line when she and her clique-mates take up cutting class. The grounded Jen misses out on going to a football game with the family, and things go from bad to much worse when the cool kids invite themselves over for a party...complete with booze. Note: This episode was produced during Season 4.

=== Season 6 (1987–1988) ===
No. overall	No. in season	Title	Directed by	Written by	Original release date	Prod. code	Rating/share (households)
123	1	"The Last of the Red Hot Psychologists"	Sam Weisman	Marc Lawrence	September 13, 1987	126	27.9/43
124	2	"The Last of the Red Hot Psychologists"	Sam Weisman	Marc Lawrence	September 13, 1987	127	27.9/43
Alex meets Lauren Miller (Courteney Cox), a psychology major at Leland College, and the two become friends ... then much more ... when Alex participates in Lauren's study of overachievers. Also, Andy goes to his first day of Kindergarten and Jennifer goes to her first day of high school.
125	3	"Dear Mallory"	Sam Weisman	Alan Uger	September 20, 1987	125	20.5/33
Mallory is hired as advice columnist for the Columbus Shopper's Guide.
126	4	"The Other Woman"	Asaad Kelada	Susan Borowitz	September 27, 1987	130	21.0/34
Andrew feels ignored when Alex begins spending time with Lauren at the expense of brotherly bonding sessions.
127	5	"Dream Date"	Andrew McCullough	Katie Ford	October 4, 1987	129	20.9/32
Jennifer uses a nerdy boy who has a crush on her as a stepping stone to win the heart of a teen heartthrob.
128	6	"Super Mom"	Matthew Diamond	Alan Uger	October 18, 1987	132	19.0/28
Elyse must choose between working on a prestigious architectural account or spending time with her family.
129	7	"Walking On Air"	Andrew McCullough	Katie Ford	October 25, 1987	131	17.4/25
Steven gets a reluctant Mallory a new job at WKS. Meanwhile, Alex leads the rest of the family on a cereal-sponsored search contest for $5,000.
130	8	"Invasion of the Psychologist Snatchers"	Matthew Diamond	Marc Lawrence	November 1, 1987	133	21.0/31
Alex becomes insecure of Lauren's visiting ex-boyfriend.
131	9	"The Way We Were"	Will Mackenzie	Gary David Goldberg	November 8, 1987	128	17.7/27
The Keatons get a first-hand lesson on Alzheimer's disease when Aunt Rosemary (Barbara Barrie) comes to visit and behaves erratically.
132	10	"Mister Sister"	Kent Bateman	Susan Borowitz	November 15, 1987	134	18.1/27
Nick gets a job as the janitor at Mallory's sorority house, which leads to friction between them. Meanwhile, Steven and Alex try to teach Andy basketball.
133	11	"Citizen Keaton"	Sam Weisman	Susan Borowitz & Marc Lawrence	November 22, 1987	135	18.9/27
Mallory runs for student body president of Grant College, and Alex agrees to be her campaign manager.
134	12	"Father Time, Part 1"	Sam Weisman	Alan Uger	November 29, 1987	136	20.2/38
Steven's newly-divorced brother Rob comes to visit with his son and troubled daughter, who is rebelling against her dad.
135	13	"Father Time, Part 2"	Sam Weisman	Alan Uger	December 6, 1987	137	19.3/28
Steven's rebellious niece defies her father, and has the Keatons examining the meanings of marriage, divorce and parenthood.
136	14	"The American Family"	Sam Weisman	Katie Ford	December 13, 1987	138	17.3/26
137	15	"The American Family"	Sam Weisman	Katie Ford	December 13, 1987	139	17.3/26
Lauren does a term paper on the typical American family, culling memories from the Keatons on their past.
138	16	"Anniversary Waltz"	Sam Weisman	Alan Uger	December 16, 1987	035	15.7/25
Steven and Elyse argue for a week about their upcoming 20th anniversary party, leading the kids to remind them of their love for each other. Note: This episode was produced during Season 2 and therefore breaks the continuity of the 6th season.
139	17	"Miracle in Columbus"	Lynn Hamrick	Rob Okun	December 20, 1987	141	17.0/27
Alex gets a job as a mall Santa, where he finally gets the spirit of Christmas after he hears a young girl's wish for her father to come home.
140	18	"The Play's the Thing"	Debbie Allen	Diane Dixon	January 10, 1988	140	22.1/32
Steven tries to stage a radical play he wrote in the '60's, but Elyse is reluctant to play the lead role.
141	19	"The Spirit of Columbus"	Sam Weisman	Charles J. Schlotter	January 17, 1988	143	20.5/30
Nick sells one of his sculptures and so Alex starts to believe that Nick's art is worth something. So he makes Nick make 35 more of them to sell.
142	20	"The Blues Brother"	Matthew Diamond	Burt Pretlusky	January 24, 1988	142	17.5/25
Alex encourages former blues musician Eddie Dupree (Brownie McGhee) to come out of retirement.
143	21	"Read It and Weep, Part 1"	Sam Weisman	Marc Lawrence & Alan Uger	February 7, 1988	144	16.6/24
Defying her school's policy, Jennifer writes a book report on the banned book The Adventures of Huckleberry Finn.
144	22	"Read It and Weep, Part 2"	Sam Weisman	Marc Lawrence & Alan Uger	February 14, 1988	145	15.3/23
Jennifer's punishment for reading "The Adventures of Huckleberry Finn" escalates into legal action.
145	23	"Quitting Time"	Matthew Diamond	Susan Borowitz	February 21, 1988	147	18.6/27
When Lauren quits work on her psychology thesis, Alex begins to find her less interesting.
146	24	"Spring Reminds Me"	Matthew Diamond	Katie Ford	February 28, 1988	146	16.7/25
Evelyn Mitchum (Constance McCashin), a former neighbor and mother of Mallory's childhood best friend Rosalie, who had committed suicide, visits the Keatons and reveals that she still has difficulty coping. Meanwhile, Steven unearths his old kit of magic tricks and starts driving the family crazy with them.
147	25	"The Boys Next Door"	Sam Weisman	Trish Vrandenberg	March 6, 1988	148	18.0/28
Elyse's nerdy high school friend (Robert Klein) visits for a class reunion, hoping to rekindle their relationship.
148	26	"Sign of the Times"	Asaad Kelada	Matthew Monaher	March 13, 1988	150	15.9/24
Andy becomes friends with a new student who is deaf. But when the other kids start teasing him, Andy decides not to talk.
149	27	"Return of the Native"	John Pasquin	Lloyd Garver	March 20, 1988	071	16.4/25
Cousin June (Danielle von Zerneck) returns to the United States after three years abroad in England. She has lots to tell, but the entire family has stories of their own. Note: This episode was produced during Season 3 and therefore breaks the continuity of the 6th season.
150	28	"Father, Can You Spare a Dime?"	Andrew McCullough	Ben Cardinale & Peter Schreider	May 1, 1988	149	12.9/21
Nick is hurting for money after he is rejected for a bank loan, but he doesn't think his estranged father Joe (Dan Hedaya) is the right person to lend him money either. Joseph Gordon-Levitt appears as one of the children in Nick's art class.

=== Season 7 (1988–1989) ===
No. overall	No. in season	Title	Directed by	Written by	Original release date	Prod. code	U.S. viewers (millions)	Rating/share (households)
151	1	"It Happened One Night"	Matthew Diamond	Marc Lawrence	October 30, 1988	154	26.1	16.0/24
Steven, Elyse, and Andy go camping and Jennifer, Alex, and Mallory stay home. After realizing they should have gone with them, Jennifer, Alex, Nick, and Mallory head to the campground. However, the car breaks down in the middle of nowhere and they must camp outside.
152	2	"Designing Woman"	Matthew Diamond	Katie Ford	November 6, 1988	155	21.0	13.5/19
Mallory gets a job at a fashion designing store but finds out her co-worker is stealing her designs.
153	3	"Truckers"	Andrew McCullough	Shannon Gaughan	November 13, 1988	156	25.6	15.1/21
Alex feels neglected when Andy would rather spend time with Nick's nephew than with him. Meanwhile, Steven reduces the household uses due to so many bills Note: This is the sixth episode of the sitcom where its opening title sequence got moved for after the first scene of the episode and not used as its opening sequence. (Not counting the cold opening sequences as follow up of episodes split in two.) This is only the second episode that doesn't start with music. It starts with the big news the Bush won the presidential election.
154	4	"Beyond Therapy"	Sam Weisman	Katie Ford	November 27, 1988	158	22.4	14.9/21
Lauren encourages Alex to join a therapy group to express his feelings more.
155	5	"Heartstrings, Part 1"	Sam Weisman	Alan Uger	December 4, 1988	151	30.1	17.6/26
The family pulls together after Steven has a heart attack and has to undergo heart surgery.
156	6	"Heartstrings, Part 2"	Sam Weisman	Alan Uger	December 11, 1988	152	27.7	16.2/24
While Steven is in heart surgery, the family holds vigil at the hospital. And just when the family doesn't need any more stress, the nurse says that Steven has to undergo a quadruple bypass.
157	7	"Heartstrings, Part 3"	Sam Weisman	Alan Uger	December 18, 1988	153	21.7	13.0/20
Steven returns home from the hospital and tries to adjust to new restrictions in his life.
158	8	"Basic Training"	Sam Weisman	Susan Borowitz	January 1, 1989	157	21.8	12.8/20
Desperately seeking direction in life, Skippy decides to enlist in the Army. But is the Army the best career path for him? Meanwhile, Steven is not allowed to eat fattening foods because of his recent heart attack.
159	9	"Deja Vu"	Matthew Diamond	Susan Borowitz	January 8, 1989	160	26.5	16.2/23
Jennifer starts dating Mallory's ex-boyfriend's younger brother, Josh (Byron Thames). However, when Mallory finds out that Josh wants to follow in his brother's footsteps, she thinks that he will dump Jennifer just like Jeff dumped her.
160	10	"Nick's Best Friend"	Sam Weisman	Katie Ford	January 15, 1989	159	22.3	13.4/20
Nick is reunited with his old dog Scrapper after his mother moves into an apartment that does not allow pets. But after the dog is struck by a car and critically injured, Nick is forced to make a heart-wrenching decision.
161	11	"Get Me to the Living Room on Time"	Sam Weisman	Matthew Monaher	January 29, 1989	161	25.9	15.4/23
Andy becomes friends with two senior citizens at a retirement home, Joseph and Eva. Steven decides to make them the focus of his new documentary. While the documentary is being recorded, Joseph proposes to Eva, who accepts. But Joseph's son, David, does not approve of their marriage.
162	12	"The Job Not Taken"	Andrew McCullough	Marc Lawrence	February 5, 1989	162	26.4	15.2/22
When Alex's friend, Paul Corman, gets Alex a job, Paul gets fired. Alex starts to feel guilty, so he quits.
163	13	"The Wrecker's Ball"	Sam Weisman	Douglas Wyman	February 12, 1989	163	21.8	13.3/20
When the first building Elyse designed faces the wrecking ball, the entire family rallies behind her attempts to block the demolition.
164	14	"My Best Friend's Girl"	Sam Weisman	Bruce Helford	February 19, 1989	165	21.4	12.8/19
Lauren tries to play matchmaker for Skippy as a favor to Alex, but Skippy ends up falling in love with her. Steven and Elyse both think they can teach Jennifer to drive better, so they compete. Maura Tierney plays Skippy's lab partner.
165	15	"'Til Her Daddy Takes the T-Bird Away"	Matthew Diamond	Susan Borowitz	February 26, 1989	166	22.0	13.3/20
Mallory's plans to buy a car from Nick's father's used car lot are stalled when Steven refuses to co-sign her loan.
166	16	"Simon Says"	Matthew Diamond	Katie Ford	March 5, 1989	164	27.4	16.8/25
Jennifer and Simon get jobs at a fast food restaurant. A ten-year-old paper girl (Jaclyn Bernstein) has an obsessive romantic crush on Alex.
167	17	"All in the Neighborhood, Part 1"	Matthew Diamond	Ruth Bennett	March 12, 1989	167	23.2	14.2/21
When their African-American friends move into the neighborhood, the Keatons are shocked and saddened to learn racism still exists among some of their neighbors.
168	18	"All in the Neighborhood, Part 2"	Matthew Diamond	Ruth Bennett	March 19, 1989	170	22.3	14.4/22
After their new neighbors' home is vandalized, the Keatons continue to battle racism in their own backyard and rally to support their friends.
169	19	"They Can't Take That Away From Me, Part 1"	Matthew Diamond	Marc Lawrence	April 2, 1989	171	18.0	11.8/19
With Lauren away, Alex begins tutoring a young co-ed (Jane Adams) and starts to develop romantic feelings for her.
170	20	"They Can't Take That Away From Me, Part 2"	Matthew Diamond	Marc Lawrence	April 9, 1989	172	22.6	13.5/21
On the brink of graduation, Alex must choose between Lauren and a pretty music student who has captured his attention.
171	21	"Rain Forests Keep Falling on My Head"	Rita Rogers	Bruce Helford	April 16, 1989	173	17.6	11.3/19
When Jennifer becomes obsessed with saving the environment, she makes everybody use things that are not a hazard. Steven and Elyse suggest she see the school counselor.
172	22	"Wrap Around the Clock"	Matthew Diamond	Katie Ford	April 23, 1989	168	17.6	11.6/19
173	23	"Wrap Around the Clock"	Matthew Diamond	Katie Ford	April 23, 1989	169	17.6	11.6/19
In this hour-long clip show, The Keatons look back on pleasant—although sometimes embarrassing—memories while filling in Andy's time capsule.
174	24	"Mr. Keaton Takes a Vacation"	Sam Weisman	Shannon Gaughan	May 7, 1989	174	16.7	10.5/17
Steven finally expresses his true feelings about Nick when he moves in with the family for a week.
175	25	"Alex Doesn't Live Here Anymore"	Sam Weisman	Susan Borowitz & Katie Ford & Marc Lawrence & Alan Uger	May 14, 1989	175	36.3	20.8/35
176	26	"Alex Doesn't Live Here Anymore"	Sam Weisman	Susan Borowitz & Katie Ford & Marc Lawrence & Alan Uger	May 14, 1989	176	36.3	20.8/35
When Alex lands his dream job in New York, everyone (except Elyse) is delighted for him. At the end of the show, the cast and the show's creator Gary David Goldberg come out for a final curtain call. Note: In 2011, the series finale was ranked #24 on the TV Guide Network special, TV's Most Unforgettable Finales.
