= 39th Primetime Emmy Awards =

1987 American television programming awards

- Date: September 20, 1987 (Ceremony); September 12, 1987 (Creative Arts Awards)
- Location: Pasadena Civic Auditorium, Pasadena, California
- Presented by: Academy of Television Arts and Sciences
- Hosted by: Bruce Willis

Highlights
- Most awards: Promise (5)
- Most nominations: L.A. Law (13)
- Outstanding Comedy Series: The Golden Girls
- Outstanding Drama Series: L.A. Law
- Outstanding Miniseries: A Year in the Life
- Outstanding Variety, Music or Comedy Program: 41st Tony Awards

Television/radio coverage
- Network: Fox

The 39th Primetime Emmy Awards were held on Sunday, September 20, 1987. The ceremony was broadcast on Fox for the first time, as the network premiered a year earlier from the Pasadena Civic Auditorium in Pasadena, California, where 28 awards were presented.

For the second straight year, The Golden Girls won the Primetime Emmy Award for Outstanding Comedy Series. The winner for the Primetime Emmy Award for Outstanding Drama Series was L.A. Law, which, for its first season, won four major awards, and led all shows, with 13 major nominations. The winner for Outstanding Drama/Comedy Special, Promise, set a new record, with five major wins. This record was tied by Temple Grandin in 2010, but still stands for TV movies. The Tracey Ullman Show received three major nominations on the night, making it the first ceremony in which the network Fox received a major nomination. This was the only time that Hill Street Blues wasn't nominated for Outstanding Drama Series, in its seventh and last season; also, no male actors of Hill Street Blues were nominated (even with 20 previous nominations). Only Betty Thomas for Outstanding Supporting Actress in a Drama Series was nominated, and did not win, making her the only one in the cast to be nominated in all seasons.

NBC continued its dominance of the field, becoming the first network to gain over eighty major nominations (82). Its résumé was highlighted by gaining all five nominations for Outstanding Comedy Series. This had been done only once before (in 1975, but with a field of only four shows), and has not been matched in either field since.

== Winners and nominees ==
=== Programs ===
Programs
Outstanding Comedy Series: The Golden Girls (NBC); Cheers (NBC); The Cosby Show (NBC); Family Ties (NBC); Night Court (NBC)	Outstanding Drama Series: L.A. Law (NBC); Cagney & Lacey (CBS); Moonlighting (ABC); Murder, She Wrote (CBS); St. Elsewhere (NBC)
Outstanding Drama/Comedy Special: Promise (CBS); Escape from Sobibor (CBS); LBJ: The Early Years (NBC); Pack of Lies (CBS); Unnatural Causes (NBC)	Outstanding Miniseries: A Year in the Life (NBC); Anastasia: The Mystery of Anna (NBC); Nutcracker: Money, Madness and Murder (NBC); Out on a Limb (ABC); The Two Mrs. Grenvilles (NBC)
Outstanding Variety, Music or Comedy Program: The 41st Annual Tony Awards (CBS); Late Night with David Letterman (NBC); Liberty Weekend (ABC); The Tonight Show Starring Johnny Carson (NBC); The Tracey Ullman Show (Fox)

=== Acting ===
==== Lead performances ====
Acting
Outstanding Lead Actor in a Comedy Series: Michael J. Fox as Alex P. Keaton in Family Ties (NBC) (Episode: "A, My Name is Alex"); Harry Anderson as Judge Harry T. Stone in Night Court (NBC); Ted Danson as Sam Malone in Cheers (NBC) (Episode: "Diamond Sam"); Bob Newhart as Dick Loudon in Newhart (CBS) (Episode: "Co-Hostess Twinkie"); Bronson Pinchot as Balki Bartokomous in Perfect Strangers (ABC)	Outstanding Lead Actress in a Comedy Series: Rue McClanahan as Blanche Devereaux in The Golden Girls (NBC) (Episode: "End of the Curse"); Bea Arthur as Dorothy Zbornak in The Golden Girls (NBC) (Episode: "The Stan Who Came to Dinner"); Blair Brown as Molly Dodd in The Days and Nights of Molly Dodd (NBC); Jane Curtin as Allison Lowell in Kate & Allie (CBS); Betty White as Rose Nylund in The Golden Girls (NBC) (Episode: "Isn't It Romantic?")
Outstanding Lead Actor in a Drama Series: Bruce Willis as David Addison Jr. in Moonlighting (ABC) (Episode: "Big Man on Mulberry Street"); Corbin Bernsen as Arnie Becker in L.A. Law (NBC); William Daniels as Dr. Mark Craig in St. Elsewhere (NBC); Ed Flanders as Dr. Donald Westphall in St. Elsewhere (NBC); Edward Woodward as Robert McCall in The Equalizer (CBS)	Outstanding Lead Actress in a Drama Series: Sharon Gless as Christine Cagney in Cagney & Lacey (CBS) (Episode: "Turn, Turn, Turn"); Tyne Daly as Mary Beth Lacey in Cagney & Lacey (CBS); Susan Dey as Grace Van Owen in L.A. Law (NBC); Jill Eikenberry as Ann Kelsey in L.A. Law (NBC); Angela Lansbury as Jessica Fletcher in Murder, She Wrote (CBS)
Outstanding Lead Actor in a Miniseries or a Special: James Woods as D.J. in Promise (CBS); Alan Arkin as Leon Feldhendler in Escape from Sobibor (CBS); James Garner as Bob Beuhler in Promise (CBS); Louis Gossett Jr. as Mathu in A Gathering of Old Men (CBS); Randy Quaid as President Lyndon Johnson in LBJ: The Early Years (NBC)	Outstanding Lead Actress in a Miniseries or a Special: Gena Rowlands as Betty Ford in The Betty Ford Story (ABC); Ann-Margret as Ann Arden Grenville in The Two Mrs. Grenvilles (NBC); Ellen Burstyn as Barbara Jackson in Pack of Lies (CBS); Lee Remick as Frances Schreuder in Nutcracker: Money, Madness and Murder (NBC); Alfre Woodard as Maude DeVictor in Unnatural Causes (NBC)

==== Supporting performances ====
Outstanding Supporting Actor in a Comedy Series: John Larroquette as Dan Fielding in Night Court (NBC) (Episode: "Dan's Operation"); Woody Harrelson as Woody Boyd in Cheers (NBC); Tom Poston as Clayton George Utley in Newhart (CBS); Peter Scolari as Michael Harris in Newhart (CBS); George Wendt as Norm Peterson in Cheers (NBC)	Outstanding Supporting Actress in a Comedy Series: Jackée Harry as Sandra Clark in 227 (NBC) (Episode: "The Washington Affair"); Justine Bateman as Mallory Keaton in Family Ties (NBC); Julia Duffy as Stephanie Vanderkellen in Newhart (CBS); Estelle Getty as Sophia Petrillo in The Golden Girls (NBC); Rhea Perlman as Carla Tortelli in Cheers (NBC)
Outstanding Supporting Actor in a Drama Series: John Hillerman as Higgins on Magnum, P.I. (CBS) (Episode: "Autumn Warrior"); Ed Begley Jr. as Dr. Victor Ehrlich in St. Elsewhere (NBC); John Karlen as Harvey Lacey in Cagney & Lacey (CBS); Jimmy Smits as Victor Sifuentes in L.A. Law (NBC); Michael Tucker as Stuart Markowitz in L.A. Law (NBC)	Outstanding Supporting Actress in a Drama Series: Bonnie Bartlett as Ellen Craig in St. Elsewhere (NBC) (Episode: “Last Dance at the Wrecker's Ball"); Allyce Beasley as Agnes DiPesto in Moonlighting (ABC); Christina Pickles as Nurse Helen Rosenthal in St. Elsewhere (NBC); Susan Ruttan as Roxanne Melman in L.A. Law (NBC); Betty Thomas as Sgt. Lucille Bates in Hill Street Blues (NBC)
Outstanding Supporting Actor in a Miniseries or a Special: Dabney Coleman as Martin Costigan in Sworn to Silence (ABC); Stephen Collins as Billy Grenville Jr. in The Two Mrs. Grenvilles (NBC); John Glover as Richard Behrens in Nutcracker: Money, Madness and Murder (NBC); Laurence Olivier as Harry Burrard in Lost Empires (PBS); Eli Wallach as Norman Voss in Something in Common (CBS)	Outstanding Supporting Actress in a Miniseries or a Special: Piper Laurie as Annie Gilbert in Promise (CBS); Claudette Colbert as Alice Grenville in The Two Mrs. Grenvilles (NBC); Olivia de Havilland as Dowager Empress Maria in Anastasia: The Mystery of Anna (NBC); Christine Lahti as Alethea Milford in Amerika (ABC); Elizabeth Wilson as Berenice Bradshaw in Nutcracker: Money, Madness and Murder (NBC)

==== Guest performances ====
Outstanding Guest Performer in a Comedy Series: John Cleese as Dr. Simon Finch-Royce in Cheers (NBC) (Episode: "Simon Says"); Art Carney as James "Weasel" Cavanaugh in The Cavanaughs (CBS) (Episode: "He Ain't Heavy"); Herb Edelman as Stan Zbornak in The Golden Girls (NBC) (Episode: "The Stan Who Came To Dinner"); Lois Nettleton as Jean in The Golden Girls (NBC) (Episode: "Isn't It Romantic?"); Nancy Walker as Angela in The Golden Girls (NBC) (Episode: "Long Day's Journey Into Marinara")	Outstanding Guest Performer in a Drama Series: Alfre Woodard as Adrian Moore in L.A. Law (NBC) (Episode: "Pilot"); Steve Allen as Lech Osoranski in St. Elsewhere (NBC) (Episode: "Visiting Daze"); Jeanne Cooper as Gladys Becker on L.A. Law (NBC) (Episode: "Fry Me to the Moon"); Edward Herrmann as Father Joseph McCabe on St. Elsewhere (NBC) (Episode: "Where There's Hope, There's Crosby"); Jayne Meadows as Holga Oseransky in St. Elsewhere (NBC) (Episode: "Visiting Daze")

==== Individual performances ====
Outstanding Individual Performance in a Variety or Music Program
- Robin Williams – Carol, Carl, Whoopi and Robin (ABC)
  - Billy Crystal – The 29th Annual Grammy Awards (CBS)
  - Julie Kavner – The Tracey Ullman Show (Fox)
  - Angela Lansbury – The 41st Annual Tony Awards (CBS)
  - Jon Lovitz – Saturday Night Live (NBC)

=== Directing ===
Directing
Outstanding Directing in a Comedy Series: The Golden Girls (NBC): "Isn't It Romantic?" – Terry Hughes; Cheers (NBC): "Chambers vs. Malone" – James Burrows; The Cosby Show (NBC): "I Know That You Know" – Jay Sandrich; Designing Women (CBS): "The Beauty Contest" – Jack Shea; Family Ties (NBC): "A, My Name is Alex" – Will Mackenzie	Outstanding Directing in a Drama Series: L.A. Law (NBC): "Pilot" – Gregory Hoblit; Cagney & Lacey (CBS): "Turn, Turn, Turn - Part II" – Sharron Miller; L.A. Law (NBC): "The Venus Butterfly" – Donald Petrie; Moonlighting (ABC): "Atomic Shakespeare" – Will Mackenzie; Moonlighting (ABC): "I Am Curious ... Maddie" – Allan Arkush
Outstanding Directing in a Variety or Music Program: The Kennedy Center Honors: A Celebration of the Performing Arts (CBS) – Don Mischer; The 41st Annual Tony Awards (ABC) – Walter C. Miller; Late Night with David Letterman Fifth Anniversary Special (NBC) – Hal Gurnee; Liberty Weekend (ABC) – Dwight Hemion; The Tracey Ullman Show (Fox): "Golf" – Ted Bessell and Stuart Margolin	Outstanding Directing in a Miniseries or a Special: Promise (CBS) – Glenn Jordan; Escape from Sobibor (CBS) – Jack Gold; LBJ: The Early Years (NBC) – Peter Werner; Nutcracker: Money, Madness and Murder (NBC): "Part I" – Paul Bogart; Unnatural Causes (NBC) – Lamont Johnson

=== Writing ===
Writing
Outstanding Writing in a Comedy Series: Family Ties (NBC): "A, My Name is Alex" – Gary David Goldberg and Alan Uger; Cheers (NBC): "Abnormal Psychology" – Janet Leahy; The Days and Nights of Molly Dodd (NBC): "Here's Why Cosmetics Should Come in Unbreakable Bottles" – Jay Tarses; The Golden Girls (NBC): "Isn't It Romantic?" – Jeffrey Duteil; Newhart (CBS): "Co-Hostess Twinkie" – David Mirkin	Outstanding Writing in a Drama Series: L.A. Law (NBC): "The Venus Butterfly" – Steven Bochco and Terry Louise Fisher; Cagney & Lacey (CBS): "Turn, Turn, Turn - Part 1" – Georgia Jeffries; Hill Street Blues (NBC): "It Ain't Over Till It's Over" – Jeff Lewis, David Milch and John Romano; L.A. Law (NBC): "Sidney, the Dead-Nosed Reindeer" – William M. Finkelstein; Moonlighting (ABC): "Atomic Shakespeare" – Jeff Reno and Ron Osborn; Moonlighting (ABC): "I Am Curious ... Maddie" – Story by : Ron Osborn, Karen Hall, Roger Director and Charles H. Eglee Teleplay by : Jeff Reno and Glenn Gordon Caron; St. Elsewhere (NBC): "Afterlife" – Tom Fontana, John Tinker and John Masius
Outstanding Writing in a Variety or Music Program: Late Night with David Letterman Fifth Anniversary Special (NBC); The 41st Annual Tony Awards (CBS); Saturday Night Live (NBC); The Tracey Ullman Show (Fox): "Girl on a Ledge"; The Tonight Show Starring Johnny Carson (NBC)	Outstanding Writing in a Miniseries or a Special: Promise (CBS) – Story by : Ken Blackwell, Tennyson Flowers and Richard Friedenberg Teleplay by : Richard Friedenberg; Escape from Sobibor (CBS) – Reginald Rose; Nutcracker: Money, Madness and Murder (NBC): "Part II" – William Hanley; Pack of Lies (CBS) – Hugh Whitemore; A Year in the Life (NBC): "The First Christmas" – Joshua Brand and John Falsey

== Most major nominations ==
Networks with multiple major nominations (Note: "Major" constitutes the categories listed above: Program, Acting, Directing, and Writing. It does not include the technical categories.)
Network	Number of Nominations
NBC	82
CBS	36
ABC	15

Programs with multiple major nominations
Program	Category	Network	Number of Nominations
L.A. Law	Drama	NBC	11
The Golden Girls	Comedy	NBC	10
St. Elsewhere	Drama	NBC	10
Cheers	Comedy	NBC	8
Moonlighting	Drama	ABC	7
Cagney & Lacey	Drama	CBS	6
Nutcracker: Money, Madness and Murder	Miniseries	NBC	6
Promise	Special	CBS	6
Family Ties	Comedy	NBC	5
Newhart	Comedy	CBS	5
The 41st Annual Tony Awards	Variety	CBS	4
Escape from Sobibor	Special	CBS	4
The Tracey Ullman Show	Variety	Fox	4
The Two Mrs. Grenvilles	Miniseries	NBC	4
LBJ: The Early Years	Special	NBC	3
Night Court	Comedy	NBC	3
Pack of Lies	Special	CBS	3
Unnatural Causes	Special	NBC	3
Anastasia: The Mystery of Anna	Miniseries	NBC	2
The Cosby Show	Comedy	NBC	2
The Days and Nights of Molly Dodd	Comedy	NBC	2
Hill Street Blues	Drama	NBC	2
Late Night with David Letterman Fifth Anniversary Special	Variety	NBC	2
Liberty Weekend	Variety	ABC	2
Murder, She Wrote	Drama	CBS	2
Saturday Night Live	Variety	NBC	2
The Tonight Show Starring Johnny Carson	Variety	NBC	2
A Year in the Life	Miniseries	NBC	2

== Most major awards ==
Networks with multiple major awards
Network	Number of Awards
NBC	15
CBS	9
ABC	3

Programs with multiple major awards
Program	Category	Network	Number of Awards
Promise	Special	CBS	5
L.A. Law	Drama	NBC	4
The Golden Girls	Comedy	NBC	3
Family Ties	Comedy	NBC	2
