= Champs (TV series) =

- Created by: Gary David Goldberg
- Starring: Timothy Busfield; Ashley Crow; Ed Marinaro; Kevin Nealon; Paul McCrane; Ron McLarty
- Country of origin: United States
- Original language: English
- No. of seasons: 1
- No. of episodes: 12 (3 unaired) (list of episodes)

Production
- Executive producers: Gary David Goldberg; Steven Spielberg; Jeffrey Katzenberg; David Geffen; Linda Neiber
- Camera setup: Multi-camera
- Running time: 30 minutes
- Production companies: Ubu Productions; DreamWorks Television

Original release
- Network: ABC
- Release: January 9 – August 7, 1996

Champs is an American sitcom that aired from January 9 until August 7, 1996 on ABC.

== Premise ==
The series is about five friends 20 years after they won a high school basketball championship together.

== Cast ==
- Timothy Busfield as Tom McManus
- Ashley Crow as Linda McManus, Tom's wife
- Ed Marinaro as Vince Massilli
- Kevin Nealon as Marty Heslov
- Paul McCrane as Dr. Herb Barton
- Ron McLarty as Coach Harris
- Libby Winters as Phoebe McManus, Tom & Linda's daughter
- Danny Pritchett as Jesse McManus, Tom & Linda's son
- Julia Campbell as Doris Heslov, Marty's wife

== Episodes ==
No.	Title	Directed by	Written by	Original release date	Prod. code
1	"As the World Twirls"	Will Mackenzie	Gary David Goldberg	January 9, 1996	01001
2	"Breaking Up is Hard to Do"	Will Mackenzie	Unknown	January 16, 1996	01002
Marty tries to win back his estranged wife, but she gets a restraining order.
3	"A Match Made at Seven"	Will Mackenzie	Gayle Abrams	January 30, 1996	01005
One of Tom's friends who just moved back into town is fixed up with one of Linda's friends.
4	"For Art's Sake"	Will Mackenzie	Peter Schneider	February 6, 1996	01006
Herb offers to pay the art school tuition of Vinnie's son.
5	"We'll Never Have Paris"	Will Mackenzie	Unknown	July 10, 1996	01007
Phoebe lies to her parents when she fails a french exam.
6	"Live and Let Breathe"	Will Mackenzie	Bill Lawrence	July 17, 1996	01010
Tom is concerned for Marty, when he loses almost everything in the divorce.
7	"To Be There or Not to Be There"	Will Mackenzie	Unknown	July 24, 1996	01003
Phoebe is the star in the school production of Hamlet on the same night that Linda has a midterm.
8	"Two of a Kind"	Will Mackenzie	Alan Uger	July 31, 1996	01009
Marty tries to dodge a process server armed with divorce papers. Tom and Linda wait for the results of a pregnancy test. Coach falls in love with a woman.
9	"Home Alone"	Will Mackenzie	Unknown	August 7, 1996	01012
Tom and Phoebe try to have a dad-daughter night. The guys try to find dates at a coffeehouse.
10	"Valentine's Day Massacre"	Will Mackenzie	N/A	Unaired	01004
Tom tries to make it up to Linda when he chooses the weekly basketball game with the guys instead of a Valentine's Day dinner.
11	"The Loop"	Will Mackenzie	N/A	Unaired	01008
Linda confides in her friend, Dana, that Tom is awkward in bed when trying to set the mood but the tidbit said in confidence gets out. Herb has a new dog and Coach gets addicted to video golf.
12	"It Must Have Been Gridlock"	Will Mackenzie	N/A	Unaired	01011
Although Tom and his mentor, Ernie, work together on a successful city planning job, Tom gets a promotion at Ernie's expense which doesn't sit well with Tom. Marty makes friends with Doris' new boyfriend and Hugh puts Coach on a strict diet because of high cholesterol.
