= Blazing Saddles =

1974 Western comedy film by Mel Brooks

- Theatrical release poster by John Alvin
- Directed by: Mel Brooks
- Screenplay by: Mel Brooks; Norman Steinberg; Andrew Bergman; Richard Pryor; Alan Uger
- Story by: Andrew Bergman
- Produced by: Michael Hertzberg
- Starring: Cleavon Little; Gene Wilder; Slim Pickens; David Huddleston; Claude Ennis Starrett Jr.; Mel Brooks; Harvey Korman; Madeline Kahn
- Cinematography: Joseph Biroc
- Edited by: Danford Greene; John C. Howard
- Music by: John Morris
- Production company: Crossbow Productions
- Distributed by: Warner Bros.
- Release date: February 7, 1974
- Running time: 93 minutes
- Country: United States
- Language: English
- Budget: $2.6 million
- Box office: $119.6 million

Blazing Saddles is a 1974 American satirical Western comedy film directed by Mel Brooks, who co-wrote the screenplay with Andrew Bergman, Richard Pryor, Norman Steinberg and Alan Uger, based on a story treatment by Bergman. The film stars Cleavon Little and Gene Wilder. Brooks appears in two supporting roles: Governor William J. Le Petomane, and a Yiddish-speaking Native American chief; he also dubs lines for one of Lili Von Shtupp's backing troupe and a cranky moviegoer. The supporting cast includes Slim Pickens, Alex Karras and David Huddleston, as well as Brooks regulars Dom DeLuise, Madeline Kahn and Harvey Korman. Bandleader Count Basie has a cameo as himself, appearing with his orchestra.

The film is full of deliberate anachronisms, from the Count Basie Orchestra playing "April in Paris" in the Wild West, to Pickens' character mentioning the Wide World of Sports.

Blazing Saddles was released by Warner Bros. on February 7, 1974. The film received generally positive reviews from critics and audiences, was nominated for three Academy Awards and is today regarded as a comedy classic, while grossing $119.6 million against a $2.6 million budget. It is ranked number one on the American Film Institute's 100 Years...100 Laughs list, and was deemed "culturally, historically, or aesthetically significant" by the Library of Congress and was selected for preservation in the National Film Registry in 2006.

== Plot ==
On the American frontier of 1874, a new railroad under construction will have to be rerouted through the town of Rock Ridge to avoid quicksand. Realizing this will make Rock Ridge worth millions, territorial attorney general Hedley Lamarr plans to force Rock Ridge's residents out of the town and sends a gang of thugs led by his henchman Taggart to shoot the sheriff and trash the town.

Not wanting to go with Reverend Johnson's suggestion to leave, the other prominent citizens named Johnson lead the other townspeople in demanding that Governor William J. Le Petomane appoint a new sheriff to protect them. Lamarr persuades dim-witted Le Petomane to appoint Bart, a black railroad worker about to be executed for assaulting Taggart. A black sheriff, Lamarr reasons, will offend the townspeople and create chaos, thus leaving Rock Ridge at his mercy.

After an initial hostile reception in which he takes himself hostage to escape, Bart relies on his quick wits and the assistance of Jim, an alcoholic gunslinger known as the "Waco Kid", to overcome the townspeople's hostility. Bart subdues Mongo, an immensely strong and dim-witted, yet philosophical henchman sent to kill him, then outwits German seductress-for-hire Lili Von Shtupp at her own game, with Lili falling in love with him.

Upon release, Mongo vaguely informs Bart of Lamarr's connection to the railroad, so Bart and Jim visit the railroad worksite and discover from Bart's best friend Charlie that the railway is planned to go through Rock Ridge. Taggart and his men arrive to kill Bart, but Jim outshoots them and forces their retreat. Furious that his schemes have backfired, Lamarr has Taggart put out an ad for the enlistment of every criminal in the West. Answering the ad are a group of common criminals, motorcycle gangsters, Middle-eastern brigands mounted on dromedaries, Nazi soldiers, and Ku Klux Klansmen.

East of Rock Ridge, Bart introduces the White townspeople to the Black, Chinese, and Irish railroad workers who have all agreed to help them in exchange for acceptance by the community, and explains his plan to defeat Lamarr's army. They labor all night to build a perfect copy of the town and its inhabitants as a diversion.

Bart, Jim, and Mongo buy time by constructing a fake tollbooth in the raiders' path, forcing them to send for change to pay the toll. Once through the booth, the raiders attack the fake town, which has been booby trapped with dynamite. After Jim detonates the explosives with his sharpshooting, launching the attackers skyward, the townspeople and workers attack the raiders.

The resulting brawl between townspeople, railroad workers, and Lamarr's thugs literally breaks the fourth wall and bursts onto a neighboring movie set where director Buddy Bizarre is filming a Busby Berkeley-style top-hat-and-tails musical number. The melee then extends into the studio commissary for a food fight and spills out of the Warner Bros. film lot onto the streets of Burbank, California.

Lamarr escapes the brawl and hails a taxi, instructing the cabbie, "Drive me off this picture!" He hides at Mann's Chinese Theatre, which is showing the premiere of Blazing Saddles. As he settles into his seat, he sees onscreen Bart arriving on horseback outside the theatre. Bart blocks Lamarr's escape and shoots him in the groin. Bart and Jim then enter the theater to watch the end of the film.

Back in the film, Bart announces to the townspeople that he is moving on because his work is done and he has grown bored with protecting them. Riding out of town, he finds Jim, still eating his popcorn, and invites him along to "nowhere special". The two friends briefly ride into the desert before dismounting and boarding a limousine which drives off into the sunset.

== Cast ==
- Cleavon Little as Bart, a black railroad worker who becomes the sheriff in Rock Ridge
- Gene Wilder as Jim the Waco Kid, an alcoholic gunslinger who allies with Bart
- Harvey Korman as Hedley Lamarr, a crooked territorial attorney general who is frequently called Hedy Lamarr, much to his annoyance
- Slim Pickens as Taggart, a minion of Lamarr
- Madeline Kahn as Lili Von Shtupp, a German seductress-for-hire that Lamarr tries to use on Bart
- David Huddleston as Olson Johnson, a high-ranking prominent inhabitant of Rock Ridge
- Liam Dunn as Reverend Johnson, the reverend of Rock Ridge
- Alex Karras as Mongo, an immensely strong underling of Taggart who rides a zebu and sides with Bart
- John Hillerman as Howard Johnson, the owner of an ice cream parlor in Rock Ridge
- George Furth as Van Johnson, a barber in Rock Ridge
- Claude Ennis Starrett Jr. as Gabby Johnson, Rock Ridge's resident town drunk
- Mel Brooks as:
  - Governor William J. Le Petomane, the governor of Rock Ridge's unspecified U.S. territory
  - A Yiddish-speaking Native American chief in Bart's backstory
  - Aviator Applicant, a nod to Howard Hughes that auditions to join Hedley's gang
  - Voice of German Dancer (uncredited)
  - Voice of Grouchy Moviegoer (uncredited)
- Carol Arthur as Harriett Johnson, a teacher who lives in Rock Ridge
- Richard Collier as Dr. Sam Johnson, a doctor who lives in Rock Ridge
- Charles McGregor as Charlie, the best friend of Bart
- Robyn Hilton as Miss Stein, the secretary of Governor Le Petomane
- Burton Gilliam as Lyle, a railroad supervisor who works for Lamarr and Taggart
- Dom DeLuise as Buddy Bizarre, a film director whose musical called French Mistake gets crashed by the brawling Blazing Saddles actors
- Count Basie as himself; he and his orchestra play "April in Paris" in the middle of the desert as Bart rides towards Rock Ridge to assume the post of sheriff
- Sally Kirkland as a studio commissary cashier (uncredited)
- Patrick Labyorteaux as Harry (uncredited)
- Don Megowan as Gum Chewer
- Ralph Manza as Joey (uncredited), an actor in the studio commissary who is portraying Adolf Hitler.
- Robert Ridgely as Boris, the hangman (uncredited)

Cast notes:

- "Le Petomane" refers to Joseph Pujol, a performer in 19th-century France who was a professional flatulist using "Le Pétomane" as his stage name.
- Carol Arthur (Harriett Johnson) was DeLuise's wife.
- "Olson Johnson" is a reference to the vaudeville comedy team Olsen and Johnson, "Howard Johnson" to the now-defunct Howard Johnson's restaurant chain, "Van Johnson" to the actor Van Johnson, and "Dr. Samuel Johnson" to the 18th-century English writer by that name. The character of "Gabby Johnson" is a direct parody of cowboy actor Gabby Hayes.

== Production ==
=== Development ===
The idea came from a story outline written by Andrew Bergman that he originally intended to develop and produce himself. "I wrote a first draft called Tex-X" (a play on Malcolm X's name), he said. "Alan Arkin was hired to direct and James Earl Jones was going to play the sheriff. That fell apart, as things often do." Mel Brooks was taken with the story, which he described as "hip talk – 1974 talk and expressions – happening in 1874 in the Old West", and purchased the film rights from Bergman. Though he had not worked with a writing team since Your Show of Shows, he hired a group of writers (including Bergman) to expand the outline, and posted a large sign: "Please do not write a polite script."

Brooks described the writing process as chaotic:

Blazing Saddles was more or less written in the middle of a drunken fistfight. There were five of us all yelling loudly for our ideas to be put into the movie. Not only was I the loudest, but luckily I also had the right as director to decide what was in or out.

Bergman remembers the room being just as chaotic, telling Creative Screenwriting,

In the beginning, we had five people. One guy left after a couple of weeks. Then, it was basically me, Mel, Richie Pryor and Norman Steinberg. Richie left after the first draft and then Norman, Mel and I wrote the next three or four drafts. It was a riot. It was a rioter's room!

=== Title ===
The original title, Tex X, was rejected to avoid it being mistaken for an X-rated film, as were Black Bart – a reference to Black Bart, a white highwayman of the 19th century – and Purple Sage. Brooks said he finally conceived Blazing Saddles one morning while taking a shower.

=== Casting ===
Richard Pryor was Brooks's original choice to play Sheriff Bart, It has been alleged that the studio, claiming his history of drug arrests made him uninsurable, refused to approve financing with Pryor as the star. However, by 2013, it was acknowledged that Brooks had in fact abandoned plans to have Pryor star in the film by early 1972, with the claim about Pryor being "uninsurable" because of a "drug arrest" only being spread by Brooks in the time after Pryor's death in 2005. According to Michael Schultz, who knew Pryor and also attended the film's theatrical exhibition, Brooks feared that Pryor would overshadow him. The role of Sheriff Bart went to Cleavon Little, and Pryor remained as a screenwriter instead. Brooks offered the other leading role, the Waco Kid, to John Wayne. He declined it, deeming the film "too blue" for his family-oriented image, but assured Brooks that "he would be the first one in line to see it." After that, Dan Dailey was Brooks's first choice for the role. Gig Young was cast, but he collapsed during his first scene from what was later determined to be alcohol withdrawal syndrome, and Gene Wilder was flown in to replace him.

Johnny Carson and Wilder both turned down the Hedley Lamarr role before Harvey Korman was cast. Madeline Kahn objected when Brooks asked to see her legs during her audition. "She said, 'So it's THAT kind of an audition?'" Brooks recalled. "I explained that I was a happily married man and that I needed someone who could straddle a chair with her legs like Marlene Dietrich in Destry Rides Again. So she lifted her skirt and said, 'No touching.'"

For the director of photography, Brooks hired veteran Western cinematographer Joseph Biroc (Run of the Arrow, Forty Guns, Cahill U.S. Marshal, Ulzana's Raid).

=== Filming ===
Principal photography began on March 6, 1973, and wrapped in early May 1973.

Brooks had numerous conflicts over content with Warner Bros. executives, including frequent use of the word "nigger", Lili Von Shtupp (Kahn)'s seduction scene, the cacophony of flatulence around the campfire and Mongo (Alex Karras) punching out a horse. Brooks, whose contract gave him final cut, declined to make any substantial changes, with the exception of cutting Bart's final line during Lili's seduction: "I hate to disappoint you, ma'am, but you're sucking my arm." When asked later about the many "nigger" references, Brooks said he received consistent support from Pryor and Little. He added: "If they did a remake of Blazing Saddles today [2012], they would leave out the N-word. And then, you've got no movie." Brooks said the use of the slur was to show how despised, hated, and loathed the black sheriff was. Brooks said he received many letters of complaint after the film's release.

=== Music ===
Brooks wrote the music and lyrics for three Blazing Saddles songs: "The Ballad of Rock Ridge", "I'm Tired", and "The French Mistake". He also wrote the lyrics to the title song, with music by composer John Morris. To sing the title song, Brooks advertised in the trade papers for a "Frankie Laine–type" singer; to his surprise, Laine himself offered his services. "Frankie sang his heart out ... and we didn't have the heart to tell him it was a spoof. He never heard the whip cracks; we put those in later. We got so lucky with his serious interpretation of the song." In an interview with Terry Gross, Laine said that he did not know at the time that Blazing Saddles was a comedy.

The choreographer for "I'm Tired" and "The French Mistake" was Alan Johnson. "I'm Tired" is a homage to and parody of Marlene Dietrich's performance of Cole Porter's song "I'm the Laziest Gal in Town" in Alfred Hitchcock's 1950 film Stage Fright, as well as "Falling in Love Again (Can't Help It)" from The Blue Angel.

The orchestrations were by Morris and Jonathan Tunick.

== Lawsuit ==
The film contains a running joke that a character's name is Hedley Lamarr but everyone else calls him Hedy Lamarr instead. At one point during the film, there's a line about potentially being sued by Lamarr for using her name. Four months after the film was released, retired longtime film star Hedy Lamarr filed a lawsuit against Warner Communications Inc. and Brooks for $10 million (equivalent to $65.3 million in 2025), saying that the film's running joke involving her name was an invasion of privacy and "entirely unauthorized".

Brooks said that he was flattered and chose to not fight it in court; the company settled out of court for a small sum and an apology for "almost using her name". Brooks said that Lamarr "never got the joke".

== Release ==
The film was almost unreleased. "When we screened it for executives, there were few laughs," said Brooks. "The head of distribution said, 'Let's dump it and take a loss.' But [studio president John] Calley insisted they open it in New York, Los Angeles, and Chicago as a test. It became the studio's top moneymaker that summer."

The world premiere took place on February 7, 1974, at the Pickwick Drive-In Theater in Burbank; 250 invited guests – including Little and Wilder – watched the film on horseback.

=== Home media ===
The film was released on VHS several times and was first released on DVD in 1997, followed by a 30th Anniversary Special Edition DVD in 2004 and a Blu-ray version in 2006. A 40th anniversary Blu-ray set was released in 2014.

For the film's 50th anniversary, it was restored in 4K and released on Ultra HD Blu-ray on November 4, 2024, by Warner Bros. Home Entertainment.

== Reception ==
=== Box office ===
The film earned theatrical rentals of $26.7 million in its initial release in the United States and Canada. In its 1976 reissue, it earned a further $10.5 million and another $8 million in 1979. Its rentals in the United States and Canada totaled $47.8 million from a gross of $119.5 million, becoming only the tenth film up to that time to pass the $100 million mark. The movie was also an outlier in that it became a historically huge box office hit from an early-year release; it would be 44 years until another movie whose official release date was in February would be the year's number 1 film, when Black Panther earned that honor in 2018.

=== Critical response ===
While Blazing Saddles is now considered a classic, critical reaction was mixed upon initial release. Vincent Canby wrote:

Blazing Saddles has no dominant personality, and it looks as if it includes every gag thought up in every story conference. Whether good, bad or mild, nothing was thrown out. Woody Allen's comedy, though very much a product of our Age of Analysis, recalls the wonder and discipline of people like Keaton and Laurel and Hardy. Mr. Brooks' sights are lower. His brashness is rare, but his use of anachronism and anarchy recalls not the great film comedies of the past, but the middling ones like the Hope-Crosby Road pictures. With his talent he should do much better than that.

Roger Ebert gave the film four stars out of four, calling it a "crazed grab bag of a movie that does everything to keep us laughing except hit us over the head with a rubber chicken. Mostly, it succeeds. It's an audience picture; it doesn't have a lot of classy polish and its structure is a total mess. But of course! What does that matter while Alex Karras is knocking a horse cold with a right cross to the jaw?" Gene Siskel awarded three stars out of four and called it "bound to rank with the funniest of the year," adding, "Whenever the laughs begin to run dry, Brooks and his quartet of gag writers splash about in a pool of obscenities that score belly laughs if your ears aren't sensitive and if you're hip to western movie conventions being parodied."

Critics often perceived Blazing Saddles as inherently "un-cinematic", defying some expectations for Hollywood filmmaking in the era, often displaying production style associated with Broadway theater and US television variety shows. This was in part due to its "simplistic framing" and the casting of Harvey Korman, known for The Carol Burnett Show (CBS, 1967–1978), which was similarly "low on characterization and story, instead opting for a high volume of one-liners and visual gags." Typical to this perception, Variety wrote: "If comedies are measured solely by the number of yocks they generate from audiences, then Blazing Saddles must be counted a success ... Few viewers will have time between laughs to complain that pic is essentially a raunchy, protracted version of a television comedy skit."

Charles Champlin of the Los Angeles Times called the film "irreverent, outrageous, improbable, often as blithely tasteless as a stag night at the Friar's Club and almost continuously funny." Gary Arnold of The Washington Post was negative, writing: "Mel Brooks squanders a snappy title on a stockpile of stale jokes. To say that this slapdash Western spoof lacks freshness and spontaneity and originality is putting it mildly. Blazing Saddles is at once a messy and antiquated gag machine." Jan Dawson of The Monthly Film Bulletin wrote: "Perhaps it is pedantic to complain that the whole is not up to the sum of its parts when, for the curate's egg that it is, Blazing Saddles contains so many good parts and memorable performances." John Simon wrote a negative review of Blazing Saddles, saying: "All kinds of gags – chiefly anachronisms, irrelevancies, reverse ethnic jokes, and out and out vulgarities – are thrown together pell-mell, batted about insanely in all directions, and usually beaten into the ground."

On review aggregator Rotten Tomatoes, the film has an approval rating of 89% based on 74 reviews. The site's critics consensus reads: "Daring, provocative, and laugh-out-loud funny, Blazing Saddles is a gleefully vulgar spoof of Westerns that marks a high point in Mel Brooks' storied career." On Metacritic, it has a score of 73 out of 100 based on 12 critics, indicating "generally favorable" reviews.

Ishmael Reed's 1969 novel Yellow Back Radio Broke-Down, a satirical take on the traditional Western, has been cited as an important precursor or influence for Blazing Saddles, a connection that Reed himself has made.

=== Accolades ===
While addressing his group of bad guys, Harvey Korman's character reminds them that although they are risking their lives, he is "risking an almost certain Academy Award nomination for Best Supporting Actor!" Korman did not receive an Oscar bid, but the film did get three nominations at the 47th Academy Awards, including Best Supporting Actress for Madeline Kahn.

In 2006, Blazing Saddles was deemed "culturally, historically, or aesthetically significant" by the Library of Congress and was selected for preservation in the National Film Registry.

Upon the release of the 30th-anniversary special edition in 2004, Today said that the movie "skewer[ed] just about every aspect of racial prejudice while keeping the laughs coming" and that it was "at the top of a very short list" of comedies still funny after 30 years. In 2014, NPR wrote that, four decades after the movie was made, it was "still as biting a satire" on racism as ever, although its treatment of gays and women was "not self-aware at all".

Award	Category	Nominee(s)	Result	Ref.
Academy Awards	Best Supporting Actress	Madeline Kahn	Nominated	
Academy Awards	Best Film Editing	John C. Howard and Danford B. Greene	Nominated	
Academy Awards	Best Song	"Blazing Saddles"; Music by John Morris; Lyrics by Mel Brooks	Nominated	
British Academy Film Awards	Best Screenplay	Mel Brooks, Norman Steinberg, Andrew Bergman, Richard Pryor and Alan Uger	Nominated	
British Academy Film Awards	Most Promising Newcomer to Leading Film Roles	Cleavon Little	Nominated	
National Film Preservation Board	National Film Registry		Inducted	
Online Film & Television Association Awards	Film Hall of Fame: Productions		Inducted	
Writers Guild of America Awards	Best Comedy – Written Directly for the Screenplay	Mel Brooks, Norman Steinberg, Andrew Bergman, Richard Pryor and Alan Uger	Won	

The film is recognized by the American Film Institute in these lists:

- 2000: AFI's 100 Years...100 Laughs – No. 6

== Adaptations ==
=== Television pilot ===
A television pilot titled Black Bart was produced for CBS based on Bergman's original story. It featured Louis Gossett Jr. as Bart and Steve Landesberg as his drunkard sidekick, a former Confederate officer named "Reb Jordan". Other cast members included Millie Slavin and Noble Willingham. Bergman is listed as the sole creator. CBS aired the pilot once on April 4, 1975, and the series was never picked up.

Black Bart was later included as a bonus feature on the Blazing Saddles 30th Anniversary DVD and the Blu-ray disc.

=== Possible stage production ===
In September 2017, Brooks indicated his desire to do a stage version of Blazing Saddles in the future.

== In popular culture ==
The Rock Ridge standard for CD and DVD media is named after the town in Blazing Saddles.

The 1988 animated television film The Good, the Bad, and Huckleberry Hound is a Western parody. Starring anthropomorphic cartoon dog Huckleberry Hound (Daws Butler), the film is set in the California Gold Rush era and has similar spoofs and gags to Blazing Saddles, as well as depiction of Native American stereotypes. Here, much like Bart, Huck is unexpectedly appointed as a sheriff to defend townspeople.

In 2011, the sixth season of the paranormal drama Supernatural aired the episode "The French Mistake", a reference to the genre-defining fourth-wall breaking scene.

The 2022 animated film Paws of Fury: The Legend of Hank starring Michael Cera, Samuel L. Jackson, Michelle Yeoh and Ricky Gervais, is a loose remake of Blazing Saddles and was originally titled Blazing Samurai. Its creators described the film as "equally inspired by and an homage to Blazing Saddles." Brooks returned to serve as an executive producer for the production, voiced the character Shogun Toshi, and received screenplay credit.
