= Victims of Circumstance =

American punk-ska band

- Origin: Clearwater, Florida, United States
- Genres: Ska, punk rock
- Years active: 2005-present
- Labels: Financial Records
- Members: Michael Smyth; Glenn Stewart; Lindsey Pittard; Jason Atheney; Devin Johnson
- Past members: Aaron Zylman; Alan Garcia; Brandon Vola
- Website: Official website

Victims of Circumstance is an American punk-ska band, known for blending pop-hooks with a unique style of ska. Founded in 2005 in Clearwater, Florida, United States, the current line-up includes band members Michael Smyth (vocals & guitar), Glenn Stewart (drums), Lindsey Pittard (bass), Jason Atheney (saxophone), and Devin Johnson (trumpet).

The VOC, as they are known by fans, built a loyal following while playing around their home state of Florida before setting out on a tour that ended with an invitation to The Mighty Mighty Bosstones tenth Hometown Throwdown in Boston, Massachusetts, in 2007. Victims of Circumstance has performed with numerous national acts including Voodoo Glow Skulls, Big D & the Kids Table, The Pietasters, Whole Wheat Bread, Everybody Out!, The Toasters and others.

In 2007 they asked The Mighty Mighty Bosstones' saxophone player and skacore veteran Tim "Johnny Vegas" Burton to produce their first album, Do It Yourself. At the end of 2008, Steve Foote of Big D and the Kids Table produced their second album, Roll the Dice, released in 2009.

In early 2011, the VOC flew to Japan and recorded their first live album, 2011's Live in Japan.

On October 25, 2011, they released their self-produced album Acupunkture and received rave reviews such as - "This album is Great!. It stands up with the best in the genre." - Tim "Johnny Vegas" Burton of the Mighty Mighty Bosstones.

Victims of Circumstance continued touring to support Acupunkture. In July and August 2012, the VOC completed another successful three week European tour which included playing at the world's biggest punk rock festival, Rebellion, in Blackpool, Lancashire, England. The VOC also provided support on their tour for bands such as MXPX, Snuff and the Creepshow.

In the fall of 2012 the band recorded a five-song EP of cover tunes. Titled Decades, it featured one song from each decade from the 1950s through the 1990s. Following that release, VOC returned to the studio to write and record their fourth studio album, No More Heroes.

In 2014, Victims of Circumstance released their fourth studio album No More Heroes. One reviewer noted that the new album "delivers even more of the catchy, fast-paced, horn-driven punk many have grown to expect from Victims Of Circumstance. And as always, there are a few bouncy ska songs thrown in for good measure." Online punk news organization, Dying Scene, selected No More Heroes as their top pick for best punk-ska album of 2014.

In early 2015 the VOC announced their third European tour to celebrate their 10th anniversary. Victims of Circumstance released their fifth studio album in 2020.

== Band line-up ==
- Michael Smyth - Vocals, Guitar
- Glenn Stewart - Drums
- Lindsey Pittard - Bass
- Jason Atheney - Saxophone
- Devin Johnson - Trumpet

== Discography ==
=== EPs ===
- Self Titled EP - 2006
- Decades - 2012
- Decades. Vol 2 - 2017

=== Albums ===
- Do It Yourself - 2007
- Roll the Dice - 2009
- Live in Japan - 2011
- Acupunkture - 2011
- No More Heroes - 2014
- Five - 2020
