= Tina Yothers =

American actress and singer (born 1973)

- Born: Kristina Louise Yothers; May 5, 1973 (age 53); Whittier, California, U.S.
- Occupations: Actress, singer
- Years active: 1981–2013

Kristina Louise Yothers (/ˈjʌðərz/; born May 5, 1973) is an American singer and former actress. Beginning a career as a child actor at the age of three, she is best known for her role as Jennifer Keaton on the hit NBC series Family Ties, as well as for her roles in numerous television films throughout the 1980s and early 1990s including The Cherokee Trail, Crash Course, and Spunk: The Tonya Harding Story among others.

== TV career ==
Yothers began her acting career in television advertisements at age three. Her first cinema role was in the 1981 television film The Cherokee Trail. She also appeared in the 1982 feature film Shoot the Moon. Her most famous role was that of Jennifer Keaton, the younger daughter in the television comedy Family Ties that aired from 1982 to 1989. She also competed in the Battle of the Network Stars in December 1988.

In 1987, Yothers published a book, "Being Your Best: Tina Yothers' Guide for Girls," sharing tips on teen concerns as clothes, manners, fitness and making friends."

== Singing career ==
While appearing on Family Ties, Yothers launched a short-lived music career. She released her first two singles, "Baby, I'm Back in Love Again" and "Girlie, Girlie," as a 13-year-old while still appearing on Family Ties. She made her TV singing debut on the February 26, 1987, episode of Family Ties. Her first album was titled "Over and Over," and contained those two songs only. While Family Ties was on hiatus in the summer of 1987, Yothers performed live for the first time at the Celebrity Theatre in Anaheim, California, performing an eight-song set as an opening act for Menudo.

== Later work ==
Yothers later appeared on several games shows and reality shows. She appeared as a contestant on a special TV child stars edition of The Weakest Link in 2001 where she was voted off in the fifth round. Yothers appeared on the fourth season of the VH1 reality television show Celebrity Fit Club, which began on August 6, 2006. After Yothers's second pregnancy, she appeared on Celebrity Fit Club: Boot Camp to try get back to her post-Fit Club weight. On January 17, 2012, she was featured on the ABC show Celebrity Wife Swap, where she traded places with Niecy Nash of Reno 911!. In February 2013, Yothers appeared on an episode of the TLC series What Not To Wear.

== Personal life ==
Yothers lives in Ontario, California with her husband, Robert Kaiser, whom she married in 2002. In 2016, she joined other parents in an effort to prevent a children's charter school in Chino, California from closing.

== Filmography ==
=== Film and television ===
| Year | Title | Role | Notes |
|---|---|---|---|
| 1981 | The Wonderful World of Disney | Peg Breydon | "The Cherokee Trail" |
| 1982 | Shoot the Moon | Molly Dunlap | Feature film |
| 1982 | Father Murphy | Beatrice | "The Dream Day" |
| 1982–1989 | Family Ties | Jennifer Keaton | 176 episodes |
| 1983 | Your Place... or Mine | | Television movie |
| 1984 | Domestic Life | Sally Dwyer | "Harold in Love", "The Candidates" |
| 1985 | Family Ties Vacation | Jennifer Keaton | Television movie |
| 1988 | Crash Course | Alice Santini | Television movie |
| 1988 | Mickey's 60th Birthday | Jennifer Keaton | Television movie |
| 1990 | Laker Girls | Tracy | Television movie |
| 1990 | Family Double Dare | Herself | Celebrity contestant |
| 1993 | Spunk: The Tonya Harding Story | Tonya Harding | Television movie |
| 1995 | A Perry Mason Mystery: The Case of the Jealous Jokester | Claire Howard | Television movie |
| 1996 | Married... with Children | Herself | "Kelly's Gotta Habit" |
| 2001 | The Weakest Link | Herself | Child TV stars special edition |
| 2006 | Celebrity Fit Club | Herself | Reality Television |
| 2006 | Who Wants to Be a Millionaire | Herself | Reality Television |
| 2012 | Celebrity Wife Swap | Herself | Reality Television |
| 2013 | What Not to Wear | Herself | Reality Television |

== Awards and nominations ==
| Year | Award | Result | Category | Series |
|---|---|---|---|---|
| 1983 | Young Artist Award | Nominated | Best Young Actress in a New Television Series | Family Ties |
| 1984 | Young Artist Award | Nominated | Best Young Actress in a Comedy Series | Family Ties |
| 1985 | Young Artist Award | Won | Best Young Supporting Actress in a Television Comedy Series | Family Ties |
| 1989 | Young Artist Award | Nominated | Best Young Actress - Starring in a Television Comedy Series | Family Ties |
