= Alan Uger =

American writer and producer (born 1940)

- Born: December 24, 1940; New York City, New York, U.S.
- Occupations: Writer, film producer
- Years active: 1972–1996

Alan Uger (born December 24, 1940) is an American writer and producer, known for Family Ties, Blazing Saddles, and Champs. He was nominated three times for the Primetime Emmy Award for Outstanding Writing for a Comedy Series for Family Ties, in 1985, 1986 and 1987; winning in 1987.

Uger was a dentist before becoming a writer, and worked with Norman Steinberg on several projects until Steinberg was hired by Mel Brooks as a writer on Blazing Saddles (1974), with Uger also hired as co-writer. Between 1972 and 1996, Uger wrote or produced dozens of TV show episodes or screenplays. Uger was also nominated for BAFTA and WGA awards.
