= Family Ties =

American television sitcom (1982–1989)

- Genre: Sitcom
- Created by: Gary David Goldberg
- Showrunner: Gary David Goldberg
- Starring: Meredith Baxter; Michael Gross; Michael J. Fox; Justine Bateman; Tina Yothers; Brian Bonsall
- Theme music composer: Jeff Barry; Tom Scott
- Opening theme: "Without Us" performed by Dennis Tufano and Mindy Sterling (season 1, episodes 1–10); Johnny Mathis and Deniece Williams (remainder of series run)
- Ending theme: "Without Us" (instrumental)
- Composer: Tom Scott
- Country of origin: United States
- Original language: English
- No. of seasons: 7
- No. of episodes: 176 (+ 1 film) (list of episodes)

Production
- Executive producers: Gary David Goldberg; Lloyd Garver
- Producers: Susan Borowitz; Ruth Bennett; Michael J. Weithorn; Lloyd Garver; Alan Uger; Marc Lawrence
- Cinematography: Mikel Neiers; Christopher Lynch; Dominic Palmieri; Robert F. Liu
- Editors: Gary Anderson; Ed Brennan; John Carroll
- Camera setup: Multi-camera, Videotape
- Running time: 24 minutes
- Production companies: Ubu Productions; Paramount Television

Original release
- Network: NBC
- Release: September 22, 1982 – May 14, 1989

Related
- The Art of Being Nick (TV pilot); Day by Day

Family Ties is an American television sitcom that was produced by Ubu Productions and Paramount Television and aired on NBC for seven seasons, premiering on September 22, 1982, and concluding on May 14, 1989. The series, created by Gary David Goldberg, reflected the social shift in the United States from the cultural liberalism of the 1960s and 1970s to the conservatism of the 1980s. Because of this, Young Republican Alex P. Keaton (portrayed by Michael J. Fox) develops generational strife with his ex-hippie parents, Steven and Elyse Keaton (portrayed by Michael Gross and Meredith Baxter).

The show premiered on September 22, 1982, and for the first two seasons, aired on Wednesday nights. In the show's third season, it aired on Thursday nights. In 1987, for its sixth season, it was moved to Sunday nights where it stayed until the series' seventh and final season on May 14, 1989.

The show won multiple awards, including three consecutive Emmy Awards for Michael J. Fox as Outstanding Lead Actor in a Comedy Series.

== Plot ==
Set in Columbus, Ohio, during the Reagan administration, the show depicts Steven and Elyse Keaton (Michael Gross and Meredith Baxter), a married couple of liberal baby boomers and former hippies who are raising four children: ambitious, aspiring millionaire entrepreneur Alex (Michael J. Fox); fashion-conscious, gossipy Mallory (Justine Bateman); tomboy Jennifer (Tina Yothers); and Andy (Brian Bonsall) who is born mid-way through the series. Married in 1964, Elyse is an independent architect and Steven, a native of Buffalo, New York, is the station manager of WKS, a local public television station.

Much of the humor of the series focuses on the cultural divide during the 1980s when younger generations rejected the counterculture of the 1960s and embraced the materialism and conservative politics which came to define the 1980s. Alex, the eldest, is a Young Republican who embraces Reaganomics and exhibits conservative attitudes. In contrast to her feminist mother, Mallory is an apolitical and materialistic young woman presented as a vacuous airhead, fodder for jokes and teasing from her brother. Jennifer, an athletic tomboy and the second-youngest child, shares more of the values of her parents and just wants to be a normal kid. Steven and Elyse have a fourth child, Andrew, who is born in early 1985. Alex dotes on his young brother and molds Andy in his conservative image.

Regarding the concept, show creator Goldberg observed, "It really was just an observation of what was going on in my own life with my own friends. We were these old kind of radical people and all of a sudden you're in the mainstream ... but now you've got these kids and you've empowered them, and they're super intelligent, and they're definitely to the right of where you are. They don't understand what's wrong with having money and moving forward." A recurring theme involved Alex hatching a scheme involving some amount of greedy money-making, which led to a humorous misadventure and ended with Alex being forced to apologize for his choices. According to Goldberg, "We actually had this structure that we'd inherited from Jim Brooks and Allan Burns, which was six scenes and a tag ... And then the last scene became Alex apologizes, in every show, we just left it up. Alex apologizes. Some version of it." Nevertheless, Fox's portrayal of a likable Alex proved to be an important part of the show's success. Goldberg again stated, "With Alex, I did not think I was creating a sympathetic character. Those were not traits that I aspired to and didn't want my kids to aspire to, actually ... But at the end of Family Ties, when we went off the air, then The New York Times had done a piece and they said, 'Greed with the face of an angel.' And I think that's true ... [Michael J. Fox] would make things work, and the audience would simply not access the darker side of what he's actually saying."

== Cast ==
Cast of Family Ties (from left): Tina Yothers, Brian Bonsall (added in season five), Michael Gross, Meredith Baxter, Michael J. Fox, and Justine Bateman

=== Main cast ===
- Meredith Baxter as Elyse Catherine Donnelly Keaton, Steven's wife and the mother of Alex, Mallory, Jennifer, and Andy. She is a successful architect and an ex-hippie liberal who lived in California in the 1960s. She is a patient, caring, and loving wife and mother who met Steven in college, where they later married.
- Michael Gross as Steven Richard Keaton, Elyse's husband and father to Alex, Mallory, Jennifer, and Andy. He is a branch manager of the local PBS station (the fictional WKS) and an ex-hippie liberal who lived in California in the 1960s. Steven can be argumentative, but is a diligent and supportive father who cares deeply about his family. He met and married Elyse in college in Berkeley.
- Michael J. Fox as Alex P. Keaton, the oldest child of Elyse and Steven. He is an intelligent and ambitious Young Republican with two goals in life: to be successful and make money. He goes on to attend the fictional Leland University and has long-term relationships with Ellen Reed and later Lauren Miller. Alex often clashes with his parents about their liberal politics, which conflict with his own conservative views.
- Justine Bateman as Mallory Keaton, the second child and first daughter of Elyse and Steven. She is an unscholarly material girl, but kind-hearted and inoffensive. Her main interests are shopping and boys. She has a longtime relationship with Nick Moore. In the episode "Designated Hitter," it is revealed that Mallory has a higher intelligence quotient than the scholastic and overachieving Alex.
- Tina Yothers as Jennifer Keaton, third child and second daughter of Elyse and Steven. She cares mostly about athletics. She hews more closely to her parents' liberal views than to her siblings' conservative views. She is aggressive but sweet. She is jealous at first of Andy, but grows to care for him.
- Brian Bonsall as Andrew "Andy" Keaton (seasons 5–7)
  - Garrett and Tyler Merriman portrayed baby Andrew "Andy" Keaton (season 4): the youngest child of Elyse and Steven. He is born during season 3, coinciding with Meredith Baxter's real life pregnancy. After he is born, the whole family quickly shows affection and a loving attitude towards him, especially Alex, who attempts to imbue him with conservative values. Andy quickly ages by about four years between seasons 4 and 5.

=== Recurring cast ===
- Marc Price as Irwin "Skippy" Handelman
- Scott Valentine as Nick Moore (seasons 4–7)
- Tracy Pollan as Ellen Reed (season 4)
- Courteney Cox as Lauren Miller (seasons 6 & 7)

=== Guest stars ===
- River Phoenix as Eugene Forbes in the episode "My Tutor"
- Jeff Cohen as Marv Jr./Dougie Barker in 2 episodes
- Corey Feldman as Student Walter in the episode "The Disciple"
- Tom Hanks as Ned Donnelly, Elyse's younger brother and Alex's role model, in 3 episodes
- Martha Plimpton as Jessie Black in the episode "You've Got a Friend"
- Wil Wheaton as Timothy Higgins in the episode "'D' Is for Date"
- David Faustino as Keith Baily in the episode "To Snatch a Keith"
- Geena Davis as Karen Nicholson in 2 episodes
- Terry Farrell as Liz Beck in the episode "The Big Fix"
- Maura Tierney as Darlene in the episode "My Best Friend's Girl"
- Crispin Glover as Doug in the episode "The Birthday Boy"
- Christina Applegate as Kitten in the episode "Band on the Run"
- Julia Louis-Dreyfus as Susan in the episode "Read It and Weep: Part 2"
- Brownie McGhee as Eddie Dupree in the episode "The Blues Brother"
- Brian McNamara as Greg McCormick in the episode "A, My Name is Alex"
- Jane Adams as Marty Brodie, a young co-ed Alex begins tutoring in the episodes "They Can't Take That Away From Me, Part 1" and "They Can't Take That Away From Me, Part 2"

The show had been sold to the network using the pitch "hip parents, square kids." Originally, Elyse and Steven were intended to be the main characters, but the audience reacted so positively to Alex during the taping of the fourth episode that he became the focus of the show. Fox had received the role of Alex only after Matthew Broderick turned it down. Laura Dern was considered for the role of Mallory. Ed O'Neill auditioned for the role of Steven, but later turned it down as he felt he was not right for the part.

Supporting cast and characters include neighbor Irwin "Skippy" Handelman (Marc Price), who has an ongoing crush on Mallory; Nick Moore (Scott Valentine), Mallory's Sylvester Stallone-esque artist boyfriend; Ellen Reed (Tracy Pollan, whom Michael J. Fox later married, in 1988), Alex's feminist artist girlfriend; and Lauren Miller (Courteney Cox).

== Production ==
Main stars Meredith Baxter and Michael Gross are exactly the same age, sharing the same birthday on June 21, 1947. In the series, their characters were intended to be approximately five or six years older, given that their on-screen son, played by Michael J. Fox, was, in fact, only fourteen years younger than Baxter and Gross in real life.

The show had several similarities or parallels to Baxter's prior series, Family. In addition to similar names for both series, the shows both initially featured three children, the youngest a tomboy, and later added another child to the cast. Baxter played the eldest child on the earlier show, and assumed the role of mother in Family Ties.

=== Theme song ===
The theme song "Without Us" (credited in season one as "Us") was composed by Jeff Barry and Tom Scott in 1982. During the first ten episodes of the first season it was performed by Dennis Tufano and Mindy Sterling. From episode 11 onward the song was performed by original recording artists Johnny Mathis and Deniece Williams, as producers were displeased with Tufano's and Sterling's version. A full-length version of "Without Us" is featured on the 2003 CD release of Mathis and Williams' duet album That's What Friends Are For, released by Columbia Records.

=== "At This Moment" ===
"At This Moment" was a 1981 single written by songwriter and recording artist Billy Vera and recorded live by Vera and his band, Billy Vera & The Beaters. Five years after its original release, a studio recording of "At This Moment" was featured at the beginning of several episodes of the fourth and early fifth seasons as the love song associated with Alex P. Keaton (Michael J. Fox) and his girlfriend Ellen Reed (Tracy Pollan). Its exposure on Family Ties renewed a huge interest in the song. People called and wrote NBC asking for the name of the song and its singer. The tune then began a revived chart run, eventually hitting #1 on both the Billboard Hot 100 and Adult Contemporary charts in January 1987. It also hit the Billboard R&B Chart and the Billboard Hot Country Chart. "At This Moment" quickly sold over a million copies in the United States, becoming one of the last Gold-certified singles in the 45 RPM format. The song crossed over to the R&B and Country formats, reaching #42 Country; as country was moving away from pop influence at the time, "At This Moment" would be the last song to appear on the country charts and reach number one on the pop charts for 13 years.

The first Billy Vera & The Beaters album was recorded live, so when "At This Moment" was used in Family Ties, only the live version existed. Vera later explained: "We re-recorded pieces of the song. In other words, they'd need 12 seconds here, or 20 seconds there in the show. So we went in and recorded just those pieces in the studio without the audience, because the audience would have been annoying, to the TV viewer. The thing that made it work better the second time was that the story of the song, boy-loses-girl, was the story of the episode "Boy Loses Girl." The first time they used the song, it was when he met the girl."

Family Ties writer Michael Weithorn would later recall: "In 1985, I had written an episode of Family Ties to start the fourth season, and we needed a sort of a sad romantic song. I just happened to go into a bar in Los Angeles and saw Billy and the Beaters. That was the perfect song, and the rest was history." In an interview, Vera talked about his meeting with Weithorn: "One afternoon I got a phone call, and this guy said, 'Hey I produce a show called Family Ties, and some of us were at your show the other night, and we heard you do this song that we thought would be perfect for an episode that we have coming up.' I got my publisher to make a deal for that with them and America responded like crazy." "NBC called us up, they said, 'My God, we've never had any response like this in the history of the network for a song. The switchboards are lighting up, we're getting letters, telegrams, where can we find this song?' People started calling radio stations, which never happens. I mean, it was a total organic hit."

On the DVD releases of both Family Ties' fourth and fifth seasons, "At This Moment" is still included and heard in those episodes.

In an interview with Rachael Ray in 2007, Michael J. Fox good-naturedly said, "Tracy and I couldn't get on the dance floor anywhere in the world for like ten years without them playing 'What did you think..."

At the 2011 TV Land Awards held in New York City, Billy Vera performed "At This Moment" with the main Family Ties cast in attendance that also included Michael J. Fox and Tracy Pollan, as the show had been nominated for and won Outstanding Fan Favorite.

=== Connection to Day by Day ===
During its final two seasons, Family Ties was scheduled on Sunday nights, often followed by Day by Day, another series from Ubu Productions. Michael Gross and Brian Bonsall brought their respective roles of Steven and Andy Keaton to the Day by Day episode "Trading Places," which reveals that Steven went to college with Brian Harper (Doug Sheehan). This episode is included on a bonus special-features disc in the Family Ties: The Complete Series Deluxe Family Album Collection Edition Box Set DVD. One episode of Day by Day was pre-empted by the network television premiere of Back to the Future, starring Michael J. Fox, airing on November 13, 1988.

=== Other appearances ===
Some characters were featured on Mickey's 60th Birthday, broadcast on November 13, 1988, on NBC, and featured Justine Bateman, Tina Yothers, and Brian Bonsall as their Family Ties characters, trying to help Mickey Mouse when everybody fails to recognize him due to a spell. Michael J. Fox additionally had a cameo in a flashback using archive footage.

== Episodes ==
Season	Episodes	Originally released		Rank	Rating
Season	Episodes	First released	Last released	Rank	Rating
1	22	September 22, 1982	April 4, 1983	56	—N/a
2	22	September 28, 1983	May 10, 1984	42	16.0
3	24	September 20, 1984	March 28, 1985	5	22.1
Film		September 23, 1985		—N/a	22.1
4	24	September 26, 1985	May 1, 1986	2	30.0
5	30	September 25, 1986	August 13, 1987	2	32.7
6	28	September 13, 1987	May 1, 1988	17	17.3
7	26	October 30, 1988	May 14, 1989	35	14.5

== Awards ==
=== Emmy Awards ===
- 1986: Outstanding Lead Actor in a Comedy Series (Michael J. Fox)
- 1987: Outstanding Lead Actor in a Comedy Series (Michael J. Fox)
- 1987: Outstanding Writing in a Comedy Series (for "A, My Name is Alex")
- 1987: Outstanding Technical Direction/Electronic Camerawork/Video Control for a Series (for "A, My Name is Alex")
- 1988: Outstanding Lead Actor in a Comedy Series (Michael J. Fox)

=== Golden Globes ===
- 1989: Best Performance by an Actor in a Television Series - Comedy or Musical (Michael J. Fox)

=== TV Land Awards ===
- 2008: Character You'd Pay to Do Your Homework for You (Michael J. Fox)
- 2011: Fan Favorite, Presented by Ben Stiller to the Family Ties cast

=== Young Artist Awards ===
- 1985: Best Young Actress in a Television Comedy Series (Justine Bateman)
- 1985: Best Young Supporting Actress in a Television Comedy Series (Tina Yothers)
- 1986: Best Young Actor Starring in a Television Series (Marc Price)
- 1988: Best Young Actor Under Nine Years of Age (Brian Bonsall)
- 1989: Best Young Actor Under Ten Years of Age in Television or Motion Pictures (Brian Bonsall)

== Syndication and international broadcast ==
NBC aired reruns of Family Ties weekday mornings from December 1985 until January 1987 before it was replaced by the Bill Rafferty version of Blockbusters. In the fall of 1987, the series went into syndication in the United States. Currently, reruns air on Antenna TV weeknights at 5:00 & 5:30 p.m. EST, Rewind TV weekdays at 11:00 & 11:30 a.m. EST, and currently steams on-demand and have a channel of its own on Pluto TV. Reruns previously aired on FamilyNet, TBS, Nick at Nite, TV Land, Hallmark Channel, The Hub and Pop.

In Canada, reruns of Family Ties began airing on CTS, a Christian-based network, on September 6, 2010. On May 15, 2011, Netflix began to stream seasons 1–7 on its "watch instantly" streaming service.

In Australia, Family Ties originally screened on the Seven Network from 1983 onwards. It became a perennial favorite repeated many times before being bought by the Nine Network which screened it up until 2008. It later screened on pay TV network TV1 before airing on 10 Peach (then known as Eleven) in the afternoons and late night until June 2013. As of June 2020, two episodes are shown on Saturday afternoons between 1 and 2 p.m.

In Germany, Family Ties was first aired on ZDF in 1984 under the title "Hilfe, wir werden erwachsen!" ("Help, we grow up!"), later on RTL (1989) as "Familienbande" (translation of the original title) and on ProSieben as "Jede Menge Familie" ("Whole lot of family").

Austria aired the show on ORF as "Jede Menge Familie" similar to ProSieben.

In the UK, Family Ties aired on Channel 4 from July 1985.

In Indonesia, Family Ties aired on RCTI and SCTV between 1990 and 1993.

In Italy, the show aired on Italia 1 under the name of Casa Keaton (Keaton House) from 1986 until 1992.

In the Philippines, the show aired on GMA Network from 1983 to 1991 and was simulcast on RPN (now RPTV), IBC from 1984 to 1989, PTV from 1986 to 1988 and ABS-CBN (now Kapamilya Channel) from 1987 to 1991. It moved to ABC (now TV5) was dubbed in Filipino from 1998 to 2000.

The show screened in New Zealand on TVNZ in the 1980s and early '90s, but has never been repeated.

== Home media ==
=== DVD ===
CBS DVD (distributed by Paramount) has released all seven seasons of Family Ties on DVD in Region 1, as of August 13, 2013. The second through fifth season releases contain special features, gag reels and episodic promos. The second season contains interviews with Michael Gross and Michael J. Fox along with other cast members. The fourth season contains the made-for-TV movie, Family Ties Vacation. Paramount has also released the first three seasons on DVD in Region 4.

On November 5, 2013, CBS Home Entertainment released Family Ties - The Complete Series on DVD in Region 1.

On November 11, 2014, CBS Home Entertainment re-released a repackaged version of the complete series set, at a lower price, but did not include the bonus disc that was part of the original complete series set.

In Australia (Region 4), after the first three seasons were released, no further release came to light. In 2016, Via Vision Entertainment obtained the rights to the series and re-released the first three seasons along with season four on July 6, 2016. The remaining seasons were released each month after including a 'Complete Series' box set.

DVD name	No. of episodes	Release dates	
DVD name	No. of episodes	Region 1	Region 4
The Complete First Season	22	February 20, 2007	April 9, 2008, July 6, 2016 (re-release)
The Second Season	22	October 9, 2007	September 4, 2008, July 6, 2016 (re-release)
The Third Season	24	February 12, 2008	April 2, 2009, July 6, 2016 (re-release)
The Fourth Season	24	August 5, 2008	July 6, 2016
The Fifth Season	30	March 10, 2009	August 3, 2016
The Sixth Season	28	April 9, 2013	September 7, 2016
The Seventh Season	26	August 13, 2013	October 5, 2016
The Complete Series	176	November 5, 2013/November 11, 2014	November 2, 2016

=== Digital format ===
In addition to DVD, the TV series is available through a variety of services such as Prime Video and Vudu in the digital format.

== References in other media ==
=== Spin City ===
Over a decade after the end of Family Ties, Michael J. Fox's final episodes on Spin City featured numerous allusions to the show. In these episodes, Michael Gross played a therapist for Fox's character Michael Patrick Flaherty and the episode contained a reference to an off-screen character named "Mallory". In the episode, after Flaherty becomes an environmental lobbyist in Washington, D.C., he meets a "conservative junior senator named Alex P. Keaton." Meredith Baxter also portrayed Mike Flaherty's mother, Macy Flaherty, in the two-part episode "Family Affair".

=== Reunions ===
The main cast of Family Ties—Fox, Gross, Baxter, Bateman, and Yothers, sometimes with a few other recurring cast members—has reunited publicly on three occasions (along with series creator/producer Gary David Goldberg on two occasions). They first reunited on February 7, 2008 (without supporting players Tracy Pollan, Scott Valentine, Marc Price, Brian Bonsall and Courteney Cox) for an interview on The Today Show to help promote Goldberg's memoir Sit, Ubu, Sit. The cast reunited again (with Pollan and Price, but still without Valentine, Bonsall and Cox) for a second time for the 2011 TV Land Awards in March of that year, which included Pollan alongside her husband Fox. That awards show would be the final appearance of Goldberg with the entire group. In October 2015, the main cast reunited for a third time with a second appearance (which included Pollan alongside Fox, but minus Price, Valentine, Bonsall and Cox) on The Today Show, and the first cast reunion since the 2013 death of Goldberg from cancer.

=== WandaVision ===
The 2021 Marvel Cinematic Universe series for the Disney+ video streaming service, references the series in the fifth episode, "On a Very Special Episode...," such as a stylized title sequence partially parodying the Family Ties opening that depicted the family first as a penciled sketch before finishing as a painted portrait, along with an upbeat theme song praising the family's love and closeness. In the episode, Wanda Maximoff and Vision are attempting to navigate raising their new children Tommy and Billy, both of whom are developing superhero abilities of their own.
