= Marc Price =

American actor and comedian (born 1968)

- Born: 23 February 1968 (age 57)
- Occupations: Actor; stand-up comedian
- Years active: 1982–present

Marc Price is an American actor and comedian, known for his role as Irwin "Skippy" Handelman on the television series Family Ties.

== Life and career ==
Price is the son of Borscht Belt comedian Al Bernie, and singer Joy Mann.

In addition to playing Skippy on Family Ties, Price starred as Eddie 'Ragman' Weinbauer in the 1986 horror film Trick or Treat. He appeared with Kevin Dillon in the 1988 action-adventure film The Rescue. He then hosted the game show Teen Win, Lose or Draw on The Disney Channel (1989–1992). While hosting the game show, Price played the young American tourist calling himself Michael J. Fox in Killer Tomatoes Eat France in 1991 with John Astin, Angela Visser and Steve Lundquist.

As a stand-up comedian, Price drew heavily on his experiences of growing up in Hollywood. He appeared on Last Comic Standing, and for over 15 years, he was a regular performer at Harrah's Las Vegas while simultaneously working as a producer in Hollywood. During the rest of the 2000s, he predominantly acted as writer/producer for cable television networks such as Disney Channel, Food Network, Animal Planet, GSN, Showtime, as well as producing the TBS game show Midnight Money Madness. In September 2013, Price began making occasional appearances on Fox Sports Live with Jay and Dan.

He is also a member of the Sitcom Legends Tour with Marsha Warfield of Night Court and Jimmie Walker from Good Times.
