= Gary David Goldberg =

American screenwriter and producer (1944–2013)

- Born: June 25, 1944; Brooklyn, New York City, U.S.
- Died: June 22, 2013 (aged 68); Montecito, California, U.S.
- Education: Brandeis University; San Diego State University
- Occupations: Writer; television producer; film producer
- Years active: 1972–2011
- Spouse: Diana Meehan
- Children: 2, including Shana Goldberg-Meehan

Gary David Goldberg (June 25, 1944 – June 22, 2013) was an American writer and producer for television and film. Goldberg was best known for his work on Family Ties (1982–89), Spin City (1996–2002), and his semi-autobiographical television series Brooklyn Bridge (1991–1993).

== Background ==
Gary David Goldberg was born on June 25, 1944, in Brooklyn, New York, the son of Anne (née Prossman) and George Goldberg, a postal worker. He had an older brother, Stan, who is five years older and a well-known summer camp director. Goldberg grew up in Bensonhurst and attended and graduated from Lafayette High School in Brooklyn. He studied at Brandeis University in Waltham, Massachusetts, and San Diego State University, ultimately deciding to become a writer. In 1969, he met the woman who would become his wife, Diana Meehan. They founded and ran a day care center in Berkeley, California, during the 1970s.

== Career ==
Goldberg began his show business career while living in Israel in 1972, landing the lead role of Scooterman in the English teaching show The Adventures of Scooterman. His first "real job" not in front of the camera came in 1976, when he became a writer for CBS's The Bob Newhart Show. This was followed by The Dumplings, The Tony Randall Show, and later CBS's Lou Grant, for which he was also producer.

In 1982, he formed his own company Ubu Productions (named after his Labrador retriever Ubu Roi, who died in 1984). In 1982, he created Family Ties which ran for seven seasons and was a critical and ratings hit; it helped launch the career of Michael J. Fox. He later produced Brooklyn Bridge and Spin City. In 1989 he produced and directed the feature film with a marquée cast, Dad, starring Jack Lemmon, Ted Danson, and Olympia Dukakis. This film was followed by Bye Bye Love (which he produced but did not direct), starring Matthew Modine, Paul Reiser and Randy Quaid; and Must Love Dogs, starring Diane Lane and John Cusack. He received two Emmy Awards (1979 for Lou Grant, 1987 for Family Ties) and four Writers Guild of America Awards (1979, 1988, 1998, 2010) for his work. He also received the Women in Film Lucy Award in recognition of excellence and innovation in creative works that have enhanced the perception of women through the medium of television in 1994 and the Austin Film Festival's Outstanding Television Writer Award in 2001.

== Controversy ==
Beginning in 2000, Tracy Keenan Wynn and more than 150 television writers over the age of 40 filed 23 class-action lawsuits that charged Hollywood's television industry—networks, studios, talent agencies and production companies—with age discrimination. A prominent industry quote cited in the case came from Gary David Goldberg, who told TV Guide that Spin City had "no writers on the set over the age of 29—by design."

On January 6, 2009, the Superior Court of the State of California, for the County of Los Angeles, granted final approval to a consent decree resolving age discrimination claims asserted against defendants International Creative Management, Inc. (ICM) and Broder Kurland Webb Agency (BKW). The consent decree affected a full and final resolution of the class claims, including all individual claims subsumed in the cases. Under the terms of the consent decree, defendants ICM and BKW paid $4.5 million into a settlement fund.

== Personal life ==
Goldberg died of a brain tumor in Montecito, California on June 22, 2013, three days shy of his 69th birthday.

His daughter is comedy writer Shana Goldberg-Meehan.

== Filmography ==
=== Film ===
Year	Title	Role	Note(s)
1989	Dad	Writer/Producer/Director	
1995	Bye Bye Love	Writer/Producer	
2005	Must Love Dogs	Writer/Producer/Director	
2011	No Strings Attached	Emma's Relative	

=== Television ===
Year	Title	Role	Note(s)
1972	The Adventures of Scooterman	Scooterman	6 episodes
1976	The Dumplings	Writer	Episode: "Gourmet's Delight"
1976	Phyllis	Writer	Episode: "Speech 1A"
1976–1977	The Bob Newhart Show	Writer	3 episodes
1976–1978	The Tony Randall Show	Producer/Executive Producer/Writer/Story Editor	30 episodes
1977	Alice	Writer	Episode: "Mel's in Love"
1978–1979	Lou Grant	Producer/Executive Producer/Writer/Creative Consultant	41 episodes
1978	M*A*S*H	Writer	Episode: "Baby, It's Cold Outside"
1979–1980	The Last Resort	Creator/Producer/Executive Producer	17 episodes
1982	Making the Grade	Executive Producer/Director	2 episodes
1982–1989	Family Ties	Creator/Executive Producer	170 episodes
1983	Famous Lines	Executive Producer	TV special
1985	Sara	Creator/Executive Producer	14 episodes
1985	Family Ties Vacation	Writer	TV movie
1986	Taking It Home	Executive Producer	TV movie
1987–1988	The Bronx Zoo	Creator	21 episodes
1988	Shooter	Executive Producer	TV movie
1988–1989	Day by Day	Creator/Executive Producer	33 episodes
1990–1991	American Dreamer	Creator/Executive Producer	17 episodes
1991–1993	Brooklyn Bridge	Creator/Executive Producer	35 episodes
1996	Champs	Creator	12 episodes
1996–2002	Spin City	Creator/Executive Producer/Executive Consultant	145 episodes
2000	Battery Park	Creator/Executive Producer	7 episodes

== Bibliography ==
- Goldberg, Gary David (March 3, 2008). "Comedy Stop: What Would Alex Keaton Do?". The New York Times.
- Goldberg, Gary David (2008). Sit, Ubu, Sit: How I Went from Brooklyn to Hollywood With the Same Woman, the Same Dog, and a Lot Less Hair. Harmony Books. ISBN 978-0-307-39418-7. "Sit, Ubu, Sit."
