= Will Mackenzie =

American television director and actor (born 1938)

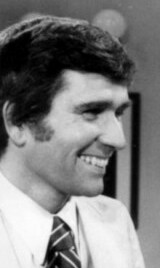
- Mackenzie in 1975
- Born: July 24, 1938 (age 88); Providence, Rhode Island, U.S.
- Occupations: Actor; Director

Will Mackenzie (born July 24, 1938) is an American television director and actor.

== Life ==
Born in Providence, Rhode Island, Mackenzie began his professional career as an actor, making his Broadway debut in 1965 in the original production of the musical Half a Sixpence. During the original run of Hello, Dolly!, he stepped into the role of Cornelius Hackl created by Charles Nelson Reilly, and he also appeared in the plays Sheep on the Runway by Art Buchwald and Scratch by Archibald MacLeish and a revival of Much Ado About Nothing. Off-Broadway he was featured in As You Like It and directed a revival of I Do! I Do! with David Garrison and Karen Ziemba.

On television, Mackenzie made guest appearances in Route 66, ABC Stage 67, That Girl, The Mod Squad, Rhoda, Maude, Baretta, and All in the Family, and he had a recurring role in The Bob Newhart Show. His sole feature film credit as an actor was in The Landlord.

Mackenzie made his television directorial debut with The Bob Newhart Show and went on to direct multiple episodes of The Stockard Channing Show, Too Close for Comfort, Bosom Buddies, WKRP in Cincinnati, Gimme a Break!, Newhart, Moonlighting, Family Ties, Day by Day, Major Dad, Phenom, The Boys are Back, Dharma & Greg, Everybody Loves Raymond, Scrubs, and Reba.

Mackenzie has been nominated for the Emmy Award for Outstanding Direction of a Comedy Series five times and the Emmy Award for Outstanding Direction of a Drama Series once.

He won the Directors Guild of America Award for Outstanding Direction of a Drama Series twice for Moonlighting and the Directors Guild of America Award for Outstanding Direction of a Comedy Series once, for Family Ties episode "A, My Name Is Alex". He also directed the 1989 romantic comedy Worth Winning.
