= Chardee MacDennis 2: Electric Boogaloo =

- It's Always Sunny in Philadelphia episode
- Episode no.: Season 11; Episode 1
- Directed by: Heath Cullens
- Written by: Rob McElhenney; Charlie Day
- Cinematography by: John Tanzer
- Editing by: Tim Roche
- Production code: XIP11005
- Original air date: January 6, 2016
- Running time: 22 minutes

Guest appearances
- Mary Elizabeth Ellis as The Waitress; Andy Buckley as Andy

Episode chronology
← Previous "Ass Kickers United: Mac and Charlie Join a Cult"	Next → "Frank Falls Out the Window"
- It's Always Sunny in Philadelphia season 11

"Chardee MacDennis 2: Electric Boogaloo" is the first episode of the eleventh season of the American television sitcom It's Always Sunny in Philadelphia. It is the 115th overall episode of the series, and was written by series creator Rob McElhenney and executive producer Charlie Day, and directed by Heath Cullens. It originally aired on FXX on January 6, 2016, and is a follow-up to the seventh season episode "Chardee MacDennis: The Game of Games". The episode's subtitle is a reference to Breakin' 2: Electric Boogaloo.

The series follows "The Gang", a group of five misfit friends: twins Dennis and Deandra "(Sweet) Dee" Reynolds, their friends Charlie Kelly and Ronald "Mac" McDonald, and Frank Reynolds, Dennis' and Dee's legal father. The Gang runs the fictional Paddy's Pub, an unsuccessful Irish bar in South Philadelphia. In the episode, The Gang agrees to a truce while demonstrating their game "Chardee MacDennis" for an interested board-game executive, but the nature of the game quickly sends things off the rails.

== Plot ==
The Gang invites Andy (Andy Buckley), an executive from Mattel to visit Paddy's so they can pitch "Chardee MacDennis" (Note: As previously depicted in "Chardee MacDennis: The Game of Games".) to him. When Andy arrives, The Gang shows him a promotional video they made to pitch the game, but he insists that they should actually play. Reluctantly, they agree, and Frank (Danny DeVito) is put on Andy's team, with Dennis (Glenn Howerton) and Dee (Kaitlin Olson) together, and Mac (Rob McElhenney) and Charlie (Charlie Day) together. The games begin with the "Pre-Game Wine and Cheese Reception", where they politely toast to each other before Charlie starts playing a trumpet and Mac, Frank and Dee start marching. Dennis explains to Andy that they are doing the flag raising ceremony, where each team's flag is shown off, noting that the winner gets to burn the losers' flags (Note: Charlie and Mac's flag is of a shirtless muscular man with a thundercloud as a head, Dennis and Dee's is a fantasized drawing of themselves surrounded by golden geese, and Frank's is four Fs in the shape of a swastika.) and game pieces.

The games begin with level 1 (Note: The game is intended to have three levels: mind (trivia, puzzles, and artistry), body (physical challenge, pain, and endurance), and spirit (emotional battery and public humiliation).) where Dee steals the correct trivia answer from Andy after he gets it wrong. Andy then correctly guesses what Frank sculpted with clay, which was "love". Charlie and Mac then get a puzzle card, where they have to put a broken beer bottle back together, and Andy draws a card which lets Dennis and Dee skip to level 2. During "The Pre-Level 2 Break", The Gang injects wine into their arms with an IV drip to prevent cheating. Level 2 begins with each team spinning a globe and pointing their finger on a random country in which they will have to speak in that country's accent for the rest of the round; Frank and Andy get Russia, Mac and Charlie get Brazil, and Dennis and Dee get Philadelphia. The first task sees that one member of each team must try to keep their hand on Dee's body for as long as possible, and Dennis is exposed for cheating by gluing his hand to her, leading the other contestants to verbally berate them.

Just as level 3 begins, Frank drugs the other contestants and chains them up in the basement as part of his new fourth level, horror. Frank, wearing a Jigsaw mask, tells them through video that the key to their handcuffs has been sewn into their forearms. Charlie attempts to find the key by self-mutilating, and the rest of the contestants give up, so Frank enters, saying it was all mind games and that no one had the key in them. Frank uncuffs them and Andy gets angry at Frank, calling him "donkey-brained" (Note: A term first used in the episode "Reynolds vs. Reynolds: The Cereal Defense" to describe Frank.) and saying it wasn't what he signed up for. The Gang soon works out that Frank and Andy know each other, and that Andy isn't really from Mattel, and they verbally berate them for cheating. Andy runs away, and The Gang decides to continue playing to determine a winner, going back to level 3, where Charlie has to take a full minute of berating from The Waitress (Mary Elizabeth Ellis). Charlie is hospitalized after fainting from blood loss, and Dennis and Dee reveal that he "cried like a baby" when The Waitress started talking, so they won the game. Dennis and Dee burn Charlie and Mac's flag and game pieces in front of Charlie.

== Production ==
The episode was written by series creator Rob McElhenney and executive producer Charlie Day as a follow up to the season 7 episode "Chardee MacDennis: The Game of Games", which was ranked third in the Rolling Stone's list of 20 Best It's Always Sunny in Philadelphia. It was directed by Heath Cullens, and produced by Tom Lofaro, with John Tanzer as the director of photography, and Tim Roche as the editor. It was the fifth episode of the season to be filmed.

== Reception ==
The episode was watched by 716 thousand viewers on its initial airing. It was received positively, with IGN rating it a "great" 8.5/10, and The A.V. Club giving it the A− rating.
