= Say I Do =

Say I Do may refer to:

- Say I Do (TV series), an American reality television series
- Say I Do (2003 film), an American romantic comedy-drama film
- Say I Do (2004 film), a Spanish screwball comedy film
- "Say I Do", an installment of the Philippine television drama Love Bug
