= It's Always Sunny in Philadelphia season 12 =

2017 season of American television series

It's Always Sunny in Philadelphia
- Season 12
- Promotional poster
- Starring: Charlie Day; Glenn Howerton; Rob McElhenney; Kaitlin Olson; Danny DeVito
- No. of episodes: 10

Release
- Original network: FXX
- Original release: January 4 – March 8, 2017

Season chronology
- ← Previous; Season 11 Next → Season 13

The twelfth season of the American television sitcom series It's Always Sunny in Philadelphia premiered on FXX on January 4, 2017. The season consists of 10 episodes and concluded on March 8, 2017.

== Cast ==
=== Main cast ===
- Charlie Day as Charlie Kelly
- Glenn Howerton as Dennis Reynolds
- Rob McElhenney as Ronald "Mac" McDonald
- Kaitlin Olson as Deandra "Dee" ("Sweet Dee") Reynolds
- Danny DeVito as Frank Reynolds

=== Recurring cast ===
- David Hornsby as Matthew "Cricket" ("Rickety Cricket") Mara

=== Guest stars ===
- Scott Bakula as himself
- Chad L. Coleman as Z
- Wil Garret as Old Black Man
- Kyra Locke as Social Worker
- Jayden Bartels as Abby
- David Benioff as Bored Lifeguard #1
- D. B. Weiss as Bored Lifeguard #2
- Sandy Martin as Mrs. Mac
- Lynne Marie Stewart as Mrs. Kelly
- Andrew Friedman as Jack Kelly
- Bob Wiltfong as Chet Wallum
- Dana White as Dana White
- Megan Olivi as Megan Olivi
- Donald Cerrone as Donald "Cowboy" Cerrone
- Paul Felder as Paul "The Irish Dragon" Felder
- Jack McGee as Detective Girard
- Lance Barber as Bill Ponderosa
- Kari Coleman as Margie
- Dan Donohue as Phil
- Karen Y. McClain as Faith
- Gregory Scott Cummins as Luther Mac
- Carter MacIntyre as Mike
- Suzanne Ford as Cynthia
- Casey Sander as Group Leader
- Jozella Reed as Dottie
- Renee Felice Smith as Belle
- Robert Pine as Jack Mara
- Mary Elizabeth Ellis as The Waitress
- Christine Woods as Mandy

== Production ==
The series was renewed for an eleventh and twelfth season on April 4, 2014, each to consist of 10 episodes. On December 15, 2016, Glenn Howerton revealed the season premiere would be a musical episode.

== Episodes ==
No. overall	No. in season	Title	Directed by	Written by	Original release date	Prod. code	US viewers (millions)
125	1	"The Gang Turns Black"	Matt Shakman	Charlie Day & Glenn Howerton & Rob McElhenney	January 4, 2017	XIP12008	0.730
In this musical episode, an accident involving an electric blanket and a VCR playing The Wiz causes the Gang to appear African-American in the mirror and in everyone else's eyes while the old man who appeared at the end of "Mac & Dennis Move to the Suburbs" vanishes. Now they must find a way to reverse the spell while facing the prejudice and discrimination that comes with being black in America.
126	2	"The Gang Goes to a Water Park"	Matt Shakman	Eric Ledgin	January 11, 2017	XIP12007	0.574
The Gang spends a day at a water park: Dennis teaches a 12-year-old girl the ways of a manipulative sociopath; Mac and Dee get stuck on a waterslide (Dee is paranoid about the amount of urine in water-park water); and Frank and Charlie try to go on every ride, including one that's not open yet. Filmed at Raging Waters San Dimas.
127	3	"Old Lady House: A Situation Comedy"	Maurice Marable	Dannah Phirman & Danielle Schneider	January 18, 2017	XIP12005	0.602
Charlie thinks Mac's mom is holding his mom hostage so the Gang installs spy cameras in their house to monitor what's going on...and Dennis turns their videotaped antics into a sitcom.
128	4	"Wolf Cola: A Public Relations Nightmare"	Matt Shakman	David Hornsby & Scott Marder	January 25, 2017	XIP12006	0.629
Frank's Fluids, LLC is in big trouble after a news segment reports that Wolf Cola has become the official drink of Boko Haram instead of Boca Raton. Meanwhile, Mac and Charlie try to promote Fight Milk (the drink they tried to promote near the end of "Frank's Back in Business") which leads to more trouble.
129	5	"Making Dennis Reynolds a Murderer"	Maurice Marable	Conor Galvin	February 1, 2017	XIP12004	0.602
In this send-up of murderer documentaries like Making a Murderer and The Jinx, Maureen Ponderosa—now almost finished transitioning into an anthropomorphic cat—is found dead in an alley, and Dennis is the prime suspect, based on his short-lived marriage to her and the growing evidence that he's a sexual predator who targets women.
130	6	"Hero or Hate Crime?"	Jamie Babbit	Charlie Day & Glenn Howerton & Rob McElhenney	February 8, 2017	XIP12002	0.551
The Gang consults three different arbitrators to determine the rightful owner of a lost scratch-off lottery ticket and prove whether Frank using a homophobic slur against Mac to save him from getting crushed by a piano is considered a heroic act or a hate crime.
131	7	"PTSDee"	Jamie Babbit	Charlie Day & Glenn Howerton & Rob McElhenney	February 15, 2017	XIP12003	0.572
Dee helps a male stripper who feels that he's hit rock-bottom after sleeping with her. Meanwhile, Dennis becomes a male stripper with Charlie as his assistant, and Mac's and Frank's mental health deteriorates while playing a virtual-reality war game.
132	8	"The Gang Tends Bar"	Matt Shakman	Megan Ganz	February 22, 2017	XIP12009	0.587
It's Valentine's Day, and Paddy's is packed with customers. Dennis demands that the Gang actually put in a day's worth of work, but everyone else would rather try to open a crate in the alley. Elsewhere, Dee is furious when she gives Charlie a valentine and he doesn't return the favor.
133	9	"A Cricket's Tale"	Jamie Babbit	David Hornsby & Scott Marder	March 1, 2017	XIP12001	0.523
In this episode that takes place between "PTSDee" and "The Gang Tends Bar," Rickety Cricket is offered a chance to escape the Gang's toxic influence and recover some of his former life when his estranged father suddenly shows up to offer him a job with his company, but a strange young woman complicates things.
134	10	"Dennis' Double Life"	Matt Shakman	Charlie Day & Glenn Howerton & Rob McElhenney	March 8, 2017	XIP12010	0.640
Dennis discovers that the woman he had sex with during his North Dakota layover in "The Gang Beats Boggs" has a child, and he must decide whether to leave her a single mother or move in with her and raise the kid; meanwhile, Charlie finally has sex with The Waitress.

== Reception ==
The twelfth season received positive reviews. On Rotten Tomatoes, it has an approval rating of 90% with an average score of 8.6 out of 10 based on 21 reviews. The site's critical consensus reads, "Twelve seasons in and It's Always Sunny still shines bright thanks to its willingness to trod into new comedic territory and push the limits of its already limitless characters."
