= The Gang Tries Desperately to Win an Award =

- It's Always Sunny in Philadelphia episode
- Episode no.: Season 9 Episode 3
- Directed by: Richie Keen
- Written by: David Hornsby
- Cinematography by: Peter Smokler
- Editing by: Tim Roche
- Production code: XIP09003
- Original air date: September 18, 2013
- Running time: 22 minutes

Guest appearances
- Roger Bart as Rep; Oscar Nuñez as Sudz Manager; Chad L. Coleman as Z; Artemis Pebdani as Artemis; Ryan Gaul as Greg

Episode chronology
← Previous "Gun Fever Too: Still Hot"	Next → "Mac and Dennis Buy a Timeshare"
- It's Always Sunny in Philadelphia season 9

"The Gang Tries Desperately to Win an Award" is the third episode of the ninth season of the American television sitcom It's Always Sunny in Philadelphia. It is the 97th overall episode of the series, and was written by executive producer David Hornsby, and directed by Richie Keen. It originally aired on FXX on September 18, 2013. The episode is a commentary on how the series had not yet received a single Emmy nomination as of its initial airing, and features many meta references and parodies of other sitcoms.

The series follows "The Gang", a group of five misfit friends: twins Dennis and Deandra "(Sweet) Dee" Reynolds, their friends Charlie Kelly and Ronald "Mac" McDonald, and Frank Reynolds, Dennis' and Dee's legal father. The Gang runs the fictional Paddy's Pub, an unsuccessful Irish bar in South Philadelphia. In the episode, The Gang tries to make Paddy's Pub worthy of a Philly Best Bar Award.

== Plot ==
Frank (Danny DeVito) brings the Restaurant and Bar Association's Best Bar Awards to the attention of Dennis (Glenn Howerton), Mac (Rob McElhenney), Charlie (Charlie Day) and Dee (Kaitlin Olson), and suggests that Paddy's Pub could get nominated. The Gang initially shoots down the idea, saying that they have never gotten nominated in the past, (Note: This is a reference to how It's Always Sunny in Philadelphia had not yet been nominated for an Emmy at the time of the episode's initial airing.) but then decides to give it a go. At the Restaurant and Bar Association's office, The Gang attempts to bribe a nominator (Roger Bart). They then drop Charlie off at Paddy's to write a song, and the rest of The Gang goes to visit the previous winner of the Best Bar Award, a bright and vibrantly lit bar where the bartenders (Ryan Gaul and Whitney Hoy) have a "will they, won't they" romantic subplot. (Note: The bar is a parody of multi-camera sitcoms, which typically win at the Emmys. Customers at the bar also laugh when the bartenders make quippy remarks, which is a parody of laugh tracks.) Frank attempts to make a good impression on the owner, and Dennis, Dee and Mac drink a "blue hole" cocktail, and comment on how they like the chemistry between the bartenders.

After seeing the success of the other bar, The Gang plans to make Paddy's more welcoming, with Dennis arranging for Dee and Mac to have their own "will they, won't they", and gives them one-liner quips to memorise. Charlie plays the song he wrote about Paddy's Pub on his keyboard, but The Gang hates it and they lock him in the basement. Paddy's then opens with their new makeover, inviting voters in the Restaurant and Bar industry to attend, where The Gang tries to be more like the winning bar. Mac misunderstands Dennis' instructions to refer to their cocktail as being "better than an orgasm", instead saying "it's better than busting a nut." Mac and Dee try to put on a fake "will they, won't they", but end up resulting to violence over a misunderstanding. Charlie escapes from the basement, and Dennis accidentally walks in on Frank and Artemis (Artemis Pebdani) having sex. After his initial song was rejected, Charlie starts playing a song about spiders against The Gang's expectations, and uses it to tell the entire crowd of patrons to "go fuck yourselves." As his song climaxes, Charlie spits at the patrons, and The Gang feel they have no choice but to join in, driving everyone out of the pub.

== Production ==
The episode was directed by Richie Keen and was written by executive producer David Hornsby. The episode features many meta references and parodies of other sitcoms, especially multi-camera shows.

== Reception ==
The episode was watched by 521 thousand viewers on its initial airing. The A.V. Club called it "one, long meta-textual joke" that is "smart, funny joke, but, ironically, it makes its case by shifting the show's focus away from what's most award-worthy about it", and "a hilariously mean-spirited "fuck you", giving it a B rating. IGN gave it an "amazing" 9.3/10, opening the review with "Excellent. Truly excellent." Paste Magazine rated the episode 8.9/10.
