= Ben Koldyke =

American television and film actor

- Born: Benjamin Koldyke; Chicago, Illinois, US
- Occupation: Actor
- Years active: 2000–present
- Spouse: Maggie Lawson (m. 2015; div. 2017)

Benjamin Koldyke is an American actor. He is best known for playing Don Frank on How I Met Your Mother (2009–2010), Lee Standish in Work It (2012), and Greg Gibbon on Gortimer Gibbon's Life On Normal Street (2014–2016).

== Early life and education ==
Koldyke was born in Chicago, Illinois, and grew up in nearby Kenilworth. His father, Martin J. "Mike" Koldyke, is a former investment banker who founded Frontenac Company in Chicago and is a life trustee of Northwestern University; through his mother, Patricia Blunt Koldyke, he is a member of the family that controls Laird Norton Company, an investment company with roots in the timber industry of the Pacific Northwest.

After graduating from high school, he did a post-graduate year at Choate Rosemary Hall. He graduated in 1991 from Dartmouth College, where he earned a bachelor's degree in English and was a quarterback for the football team.

== Career ==
Koldyke worked as a high school English teacher and football coach in Chicago. His acting career received a jump start after a chance encounter with It's Always Sunny in Philadelphia creator-star, Rob McElhenney. Regulars at the same Venice cafe, he covered Rob's tab with a note that said he "thought his show was fantastic," and this exchange led to Koldyke's first TV pilot, Boldly Going Nowhere for Fox, a few years later.

After Boldly was not picked up, Koldyke went on to recur as Dale Tomasson in the HBO series Big Love and as Don Frank in How I Met Your Mother for CBS.

In 2012, Koldyke starred as the lead character in the short-lived ABC comedy series Work It and later guest starred in HBO's The Newsroom. 2013 saw him star in another ABC sitcom, Back in the Game, opposite James Caan and Maggie Lawson. He had a significant arc on Showtime's Masters of Sex as teacher and football coach Paul Edley, and played male chauvinist Brent throughout the final season of The Good Place. In 2021 he had a recurring role on season 1 of Peacock sitcom Rutherford Falls.

Koldyke was seen on the big screen in 2016 in a supporting role for Disney's The Finest Hours alongside Chris Pine, Casey Affleck, Eric Bana, and Ben Foster.

== Personal life ==
On August 8, 2015, Koldyke married actress Maggie Lawson in a ceremony at his family's ranch in Las Vegas, New Mexico. In early 2017, Lawson filed for divorce from Koldyke.

== Filmography ==
=== Film ===
| Year | Title | Role | Notes |
|---|---|---|---|
| 2000 | The Next Best Thing | Kelly's Boyfriend | |
| 2000 | Thirteen Days | RF-8 Pilot | |
| 2001 | Red Zone | Dutch Van Roble | Also writer and director |
| 2002 | Osama Bin Laden: Behind the Madness | | Writer and director |
| 2003 | Say I Do | Ben | |
| 2003 | Stuck on You | Officer Tommy Johnson | |
| 2008 | Jedi Gym | Master Flynn | Short film, also writer and director |
| 2016 | The Finest Hours | Sam | |

=== Television ===
| Year | Title | Role | Notes |
|---|---|---|---|
| 2002 | 24 | LAPD Officer | Episode: "Day 2: 10:00 a.m.-11:00 a.m." |
| 2009 | Boldly Going Nowhere | | TV pilot |
| 2009 | It's Always Sunny in Philadelphia | Sean | Episode: "The Gang Exploits the Mortgage Crisis" |
| 2009 | The Big D | Will Dupree | TV pilot |
| 2009 | This Little Piggy | | TV pilot |
| 2010 | Big Love | Dale Tomasson | 5 episodes |
| 2009–2010 | How I Met Your Mother | Don Frank | 6 episodes |
| 2012 | Work It | Lee Standish | Series regular, 11 episodes |
| 2013 | The Newsroom | Cyrus West | Episode: "First Thing We Do, Let's Kill All the Lawyers" |
| 2013 | Back in the Game | Dick Slingbaugh | Series regular |
| 2014–2016 | Gortimer Gibbon's Life on Normal Street | Greg Gibbon | Recurring |
| 2015 | Mr. Robinson | Jimmy | Series regular |
| 2015 | Masters of Sex | Paul Edley | Recurring |
| 2017 | Curb Your Enthusiasm | Dave | Episode: "The Accidental Text on Purpose" |
| 2018 | Silicon Valley | Ben | Episode: "Chief Operating Officer" |
| 2019 | The Good Place | Brent Norwalk | Recurring (season 4) |
| 2021 | Rutherford Falls | Dudley "Duz" Rutherford | Recurring |
| 2025 | Paradise | Jack Barnes | Episode: "Agent Billy Pace" |
