= It's Always Sunny in Philadelphia season 11 =

2016 season of American television series

It's Always Sunny in Philadelphia
- Season 11
- Promotional poster
- Starring: Charlie Day; Glenn Howerton; Rob McElhenney; Kaitlin Olson; Danny DeVito
- No. of episodes: 10

Release
- Original network: FXX
- Original release: January 6 – March 9, 2016

Season chronology
- ← Previous; Season 10 Next → Season 12

The eleventh season of the American television sitcom series It's Always Sunny in Philadelphia premiered on FXX on January 6, 2016. The season consists of 10 episodes and concluded on March 9, 2016.

== Cast ==
=== Main cast ===
- Charlie Day as Charlie Kelly
- Glenn Howerton as Dennis Reynolds
- Rob McElhenney as Mac
- Kaitlin Olson as Deandra "Dee" Reynolds
- Danny DeVito as Frank Reynolds

=== Recurring cast ===
- Mary Elizabeth Ellis as The Waitress
- Lance Barber as Bill Ponderosa

=== Guest stars ===
- Andy Buckley as Andy
- Aisha Hinds as Welfare Caseworker
- Dean Cameron as David Drisko
- Courtney Gains as Roach
- Natasha Alam as Tatiana
- Kevin Farley as Turkey
- David Hornsby as Cricket
- Richard Grieco as Richard Greico
- Brittney Alger as Cindy
- Jordana Capra as Film Society Woman
- Mary Holland as Blair
- Steve Witting as Wally
- Wil Garret as Old Man
- Artemis Pebdani as Artemis
- Shelly Desai as Hwang
- Dakota Buchanan as Bobby Ponderosa
- Andrew Friedman as Jack Kelly
- Jim Ortlieb as Belka Maier
- Catherine Reitman as Maureen Ponderosa
- Thesy Surface as Margaret McPoyle
- Brian Unger as The Lawyer
- Reginald VelJohnson as Judge Melvoy
- Sean Whalen as Lion McPoyle
- Guillermo del Toro as Pappy McPoyle
- Chris Jai Alex as Bailiff
- Kevin Thompson as Little Man
- Brian Doyle-Murray as Captain Garcia
- Tuc Watkins as Scott
- Eric Ledgin as David
- Brooke Baumer as Marlene
- Bryan Cogman as Insurance Adjuster

== Production ==
The series was renewed for an eleventh and twelfth season on April 4, 2014, each to consist of 10 episodes.

== Episodes ==
No. overall	No. in season	Title	Directed by	Written by	Original release date	Prod. code	US viewers (millions)
115	1	"Chardee MacDennis 2: Electric Boogaloo"	Heath Cullens	Rob McElhenney & Charlie Day	January 6, 2016	XIP11005	0.716
The gang agrees to a truce while demonstrating their game Chardee MacDennis for an interested board-game executive, but the nature of the game quickly sends things off the rails.
116	2	"Frank Falls Out the Window"	Heath Cullens	David Hornsby	January 13, 2016	XIP11004	0.511
Frank falls out the window and suffers a brain injury that makes him think it's 2006. When the Gang discovers this, they immediately try to profit from his trauma and rectify the mistakes they made 10 years ago.
117	3	"The Gang Hits the Slopes"	Heath Cullens	Dave Chernin & John Chernin	January 20, 2016	XIP11001	0.609
In this send-up of 1980s ski movies and sex comedies, Dennis, Dee, Mac, and Charlie go skiing in the Poconos and Frank plots to turn the ski resort into a private club for the rich.
118	4	"Dee Made a Smut Film"	Todd Biermann	Eric Ledgin	January 27, 2016	XIP11006	0.478
Dee shows the Gang a clip from an independent film she appeared in that turns out to be a Cinemax softcore porno starring Richard Grieco. The Gang argues over what is considered art, leading Mac and Frank to try to market Charlie's childish doodles as modern art and Dennis recruits Dee to adapt his erotic memoirs into a film to cash in on the success of Fifty Shades of Grey.
119	5	"Mac & Dennis Move to the Suburbs"	Todd Biermann	Hunter Covington	February 3, 2016	XIP11010	0.563
Dee's anger and a wager from Frank lead Mac and Dennis to try living in a rented suburban house, with disastrous results.
120	6	"Being Frank"	Heath Cullens	Scott Marder	February 10, 2016	XIP11002	0.536
In this episode shown through a first-person POV, Frank gets left out of a plan to get Dennis' SUV out of an impound lot and tries to keep up, only to get distracted by drugs, a hospital visit, Bill Ponderosa, and Artemis.
121	7	"McPoyle vs. Ponderosa: The Trial of the Century"	Todd Biermann	Conor Galvin	February 17, 2016	XIP11009	0.531
Liam McPoyle (not present in court because of pinkeye in his good eye) sues Bill Ponderosa for the loss of his eye during "The Maureen Ponderosa Wedding Massacre."
122	8	"Charlie Catches a Leprechaun"	Heath Cullens	Jon Silberman & Josh Silberman	February 24, 2016	XIP11003	0.515
Dennis attempts to "streamline" Paddy's by creating a mobile "Paddy's Wagon" for Saint Patrick's Day, which quickly falls apart; Charlie attempts to capture a leprechaun.
123	9	"The Gang Goes to Hell"	Todd Biermann	David Hornsby & Scott Marder	March 2, 2016	XIP11007	0.485
First part of two, where Mac treats the Gang to a Christian-themed cruise; while they're confronting their various vices, he discovers a few shocking truths about his own beliefs.
124	10	"The Gang Goes to Hell: Part Two"	Todd Biermann	David Hornsby & Scott Marder	March 9, 2016	XIP11008	0.460
The second part of two, where with disaster looming, the Gang tries unsuccessfully to make amends with one another while locked in a brig that's flooding with ocean water.

== Reception ==
The eleventh season received positive reviews. On Rotten Tomatoes, it has an approval rating of 100% with an average score of 8.2 out of 10 based on 14 reviews. The website's critical consensus reads, "The Gang remains hopelessly toxic in an uproarious season filled with self-sabotage and routine recklessness, but viewers who love the series' craven humor probably wouldn't want them any other way."
