= Boldly Going Nowhere =

Proposed American television series

Boldly Going Nowhere is a proposed American science fiction single-camera comedy television series created by Rob McElhenney, Charlie Day, Glenn Howerton and Adam Stein that was originally to be aired in 2009 on the Fox network. The series was planned as a parody of the Star Trek franchise in the format of a workplace sitcom; the title was a reference to the famous phrase "To boldly go where no man has gone before" from the opening speech in the first two Star Trek series. A pilot was shot in 2008, but the project was shelved indefinitely.

In September 2022, the pilot episode was uploaded in its entirety to YouTube.

Being from the same creative team as It's Always Sunny in Philadelphia, multiple cast members from that series appear, including Howerton and Day, in addition to David Hornsby, Kaitlin Olson, Artemis Pebdani, Chad L. Coleman, and Benjamin Koldyke, who plays the lead character here and also guest starred on Always Sunny.

== Premise ==
The show is a workplace comedy in a sci-fi setting dealing with the day-to-day adventures of the captain and crew of intergalactic rock-collecting spaceship RC-7, operating under the Galactic Coalition in the year 2189. Captain Ron Teague hopes to discover new worlds and civilizations instead of being a rock-collector. Unfortunately, he and his crew are immoral and incompetent people, and it is quickly apparent that they are all woefully delusional about the mundanity of their lives.

== Development ==
The initial concept for a comedy on a spaceship was pitched by Adam Stein, then a writers' assistant on It's Always Sunny in Philadelphia, to the Always Sunny co-creators, stars and showrunners Charlie Day, Glenn Howerton and Rob McElhenney in August 2007 when season 3 of the series was being edited. The three began to discuss it seriously during the 2007–08 writers' strike. After the strike ended, the trio brainstormed ideas with Stein and developed a script, with Day and McElhenney producing the first draft and all four receiving writing and co-creator credits. By March 2009, RCG Productions had signed a two-year deal with 20th Century Fox TV and received a pilot order based on their script, in addition to orders for scripts for five more episodes. Day, Howerton and McElhenney were signed on as executive producers, along with their manager Nick Frenkel and Michael Rotenberg from 3 Arts Entertainment.

The trio announced the upcoming project at SDCC 2008, while promoting season 4 of Sunny, and their plans to have the show on the air in 2009. They hoped to be heavily involved in the first season without playing any of the main roles, and to hire a showrunner to take over after the first six episodes so that they could continue to prioritize their FX show.

Ben Koldyke, who had written, directed and starred in the digital short Jedi Gym parodying Star Wars but was a relative unknown at the time, had approached RCG to get a writer-director position on Boldly Going Nowhere; instead he landed the lead role as the rogue captain and later went on to guest star in season 5 of Always Sunny while former Arrested Development actor Tony Hale was cast as his android companion. David Hornsby and Artemis Pebdani, who had both played recurring roles on It's Always Sunny in Philadelphia (Hornsby was also an executive producer) were cast as the captain's right-hand man and the alien communications officer respectively. Chad L. Coleman, best known at the time for his role as Dennis "Cutty" in The Wire, was cast as the chief of security and would go on to have a recurring role on Sunny starting in season 6. Oliver Platt was cast as Supervisor Bob Thompson in a cameo role.

A pilot was shot in October 2008 after post-production on season 4 of Always Sunny had been completed. The episode was directed by Wayne McClammy, and featured appearances by Always Sunny main cast members Kaitlin Olson and Howerton in guest roles as Tracy Brigsby and the inspector Lt Zander Centauri respectively, while Day made a brief cameo. By December 2008, it was reported that Fox was considering Boldly Going Nowhere and Glee most seriously among its slate of pilots for the following season because of positive responses to screenings.

However, in August 2009, Howerton revealed that the pilot was being rewritten, with Seinfeld writer Larry Charles now involved, to include more science fiction elements like aliens and world building for future episodes. The series underwent sporadic development over the next several years, but no further filming was done.

== Cast ==
- Ben Koldyke as Ronald Teague, the incompetent yet overly confident "Captain" of Galactic Coalition Spacecraft Rock Collector 7 (RC-7), who doesn't actually possess the military rank of Captain since he is simply a private contractor.
- David Hornsby as Lieutenant Lance Brigsby, the Captain's subservient, clumsy and milquetoast right-hand man whose wife Tracy cheats on him and brother-in-law Barry is a convicted felon.
- Chad L. Coleman as "Cobalt", the tough and braggadocious Chief of Security who is very proud of his bodybuilding achievements and tries to boast them in front of anyone he can for validation somewhat narcissistically.
- Lennon Parham as Joyce Beck, the principled and steadfast but insecure Pilot who is attracted to Teague, with whom she shares a romantic history but who doesn't entirely reciprocate her feelings, and tries to make him jealous of her by desperately and unsuccessfully flirting with other ship members / visitors.
- Tony Hale as Robot, the ship's fastidious Intelligence Android who's secretly plotting a robot uprising but can't find any "robots" to join his cause other than basic ship machinery and smart devices that don't understand his instructions. Teague finds him annoying and prefers to switch him off, much to the chagrin of Robot.
- Artemis Pebdani as Startemis, the Killjovian Communications Officer who has an obsession with the traditional weaponry & violent customs of her species.
- Lenny Venito as Pete, the "Humanphibian" mechanic in the engine room who takes offense to being called "half fish".
- Kaitlin Olson as Tracy, Brigsby's detached and self-interested wife who is not living on the spaceship and manipulates him over reluctant video calls to take advantage of him and demand all of his income to support their apparent children, which she actually spends on herself to live in luxury, while showing no interest in Brigsby and meanwhile cheating on him and having other "dads" to kids that she complains send more money than him.
- Glenn Howerton as Lieutenant Xander Centauri, an "inspector" sent to report on the ship's operations who had been attempting to board for days and floating in space while the crew ignored him according to Teague's instructions. After Teague is forced by his superior to let him on, the disgruntled Xander is shocked by the disorganized nature, ineffectualness and inappropriate behavior of the workplace and its members.
- Charlie Day as a Trainee who was apparently using the hologram simulation deck for sexual pleasure, which seems to be a common practice on the ship despite the "official position" that it's strictly for training purposes. Pilot Beck had complained about it and threatened to file an official report.

== Status ==
In May 2011, Howerton announced via his personal Twitter account that the show had been "shelved for now". In October 2013, McElhenney stated in a Reddit AMA that they were again working on the show.

In August 2022, two clips from the pilot were officially released to the public on The Always Sunny Podcast. In September 2022, the pilot episode was uploaded in its entirety to YouTube, though there are some sections of missing audio and no subtitles or script contained for the absent dialogue.

== See also ==
- Quark (TV series)
- The Orville
- Avenue 5
