= Physical Education (Community) =

- Community episode
- Episode no.: Season 1 Episode 17
- Directed by: Anthony Russo
- Written by: Jessie Miller
- Production code: 118
- Original air date: March 4, 2010

Guest appearances
- Jim Rash as Dean Craig Pelton; Blake Clark as Coach Bogner; Jill Latiano as Courtney; Carrie Wiita as Jenny Adams; Richard Erdman as Leonard

Episode chronology
← Previous "Communication Studies"	Next → "Basic Genealogy"
- Community season 1

"Physical Education" is the seventeenth episode of the first season of the American comedy television series Community. It aired in the United States on NBC on March 4, 2010. It was written by Jessie Miller and directed by Anthony Russo. In the episode, Jeff faces off with the coach of the billiards class over wearing gym shorts, while the rest of the group encourages Abed to pursue a girl they think has a crush on him. It received positive reviews from critics.

== Plot ==
Troy (Donald Glover) finds a hand-drawn portrait with hearts around it resembling Abed (Danny Pudi) in his used Spanish book. The group concludes that the book's previous owner, Jenny Adams (Carrie Wiita), likes Abed. However, Abed seems uninterested in meeting her.

Jeff (Joel McHale) joins a billiards class and impresses Coach Bogner (Blake Clark) with his technique. However, Bogner tells the class they must wear gym shorts because pool is a physical education class, frustrating Jeff, who has dressed stylishly for the sport. Meanwhile, the group encourages Abed to talk to Jenny in the cafeteria. After some urging, he heads over, although he acts in an off-putting way as he does so. The group stops him and decides to teach him how to attract women.

Jeff enters class in the shorts, visibly uncomfortable. After failing to look cool, he changes his clothes and confronts Bogner, who notes to the rest of the class that Jeff cares too much about his appearance. Jeff challenges him to a game of pool, but Bogner only offers to play Jeff in shorts; Jeff refuses and leaves the class.

The other group members teach Abed how to act differently for Jenny; Abed embodies Don Draper and seduces Annie in a practice situation, showing the group his ability to impersonate. Jeff enters and chastises them for trying to change Abed. Abed then imitates Jeff, which impresses the group; they encourage him to act like that when he approaches Jenny. Abed meets Jenny and begins seducing her until her boyfriend (Pudi), a white student with a face identical to Abed's, appears and threatens him.

Later, the group worries Abed will be upset over what happened. However, when he arrives, he seems unfazed. He explains that he went after Jenny because he knew it was important to the group that he learn to act normally and that they feel as though they can help him, citing his mother's abandonment and bullying as the usual outcomes when others become frustrated with him. He also explains that he was able to change his personality for the group because he was satisfied enough with his own personality, which inspires Jeff to overcome his ego.

Jeff enters the common room in shorts and challenges Bogner to play him; a crowd gathers to watch their intense match. In between shots, Bogner argues Jeff has not actually changed. Jeff strips down to his underwear, claiming he does not care how he looks, and Bogner follows suit. Bogner gets to the last ball, still taunting Jeff. To try to show each other up, both men rip off their underwear. Bogner misses his shot, allowing Jeff to win and earn Bogner's respect; while Bogner tells Jeff he can wear whatever he likes to class, Jeff chooses the gym clothes. Afterwards, one of Jeff's classmates (Jill Latiano) asks Jeff to introduce her to Abed; Jeff suggests she introduce herself instead.

== Production ==
This episode was director Anthony Russo's sixth episode and writer Jessie Miller's first of the series.

The climactic pool scene features the song "Werewolves of London", which was used in a similar scene in the film The Color of Money. Joel McHale later remarked that he wore a dance belt for the portions in which Jeff is naked but added that it "required a lot of bravery on [his] part", as he had never acted in a scene like that before.

== Reception ==
=== Ratings ===
In its original American broadcast on March 4, 2010, the episode was viewed by 5.06 million viewers and achieved a 2.3 rating among adults 18-49, placing third in its timeslot behind American Idol and Survivor: Heroes vs. Villains.

=== Reception ===
The episode received positive reviews from critics. Jonah Krakow of IGN rated it an 8.5/10, denoting a "great" episode, and called it "another solid episode with yet another uproarious finale". Sean Gandert of Paste also gave it an 8.5/10, noting that the show's cast had become very balanced and that both plotlines were strong. Emily VanDerWerff of The A.V. Club gave it an A− grade, arguing that the show takes its strength from a strong ensemble and that it has a "philosophical bent" that made its conflicts much more compelling than other sitcoms. John Young of Entertainment Weekly noted that the episode was what the show needed as it faced renewal or cancellation and called it "the episode [he'd] choose when introducing the show to the uninitiated."

In a retrospective ranking of the show's 110 episodes, Cory Barker of TV.com placed the episode thirty-seventh, noting that it (along with "Communication Studies" and "Beginner Pottery") helped to mark the show's shift from "community college hijinks" to "conceptual and parodic nods". Dustin Rowles of Uproxx later ranked the episode eleventh overall in his list of the show's top fifteen episodes.
