= Charlie Work =

- It's Always Sunny in Philadelphia episode
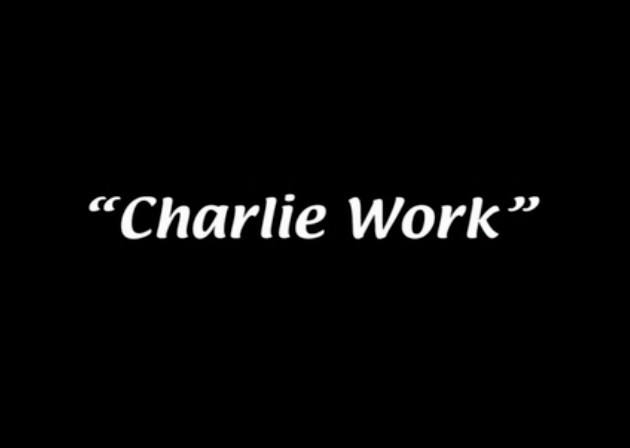
- Title card for the episode.
- Episode no.: Season 10; Episode 4
- Directed by: Matt Shakman
- Written by: Charlie Day; Glenn Howerton; Rob McElhenney
- Cinematography by: John Tanzer
- Editing by: Josh Drisko
- Production code: XIP10004
- Original air date: February 4, 2015
- Running time: 22 minutes

Guest appearances
- Francesca P. Roberts as Sandy Lawlor; David Pressman as Delivery Guy

Episode chronology
← Previous "Psycho Pete Returns"	Next → "The Gang Spies Like U.S."
- It's Always Sunny in Philadelphia season 10

"Charlie Work" is the fourth episode of the tenth season of the American television sitcom It's Always Sunny in Philadelphia. It is the 108th overall episode of the series, and was written by executive producers Charlie Day, Glenn Howerton, and series creator Rob McElhenney, and directed by executive producer Matt Shakman. It originally aired on FXX on February 4, 2015.

The series follows "The Gang", a group of five misfit friends: twins Dennis and Deandra "(Sweet) Dee" Reynolds, their friends Charlie Kelly and Ronald "Mac" McDonald, and Frank Reynolds, Dennis' and Dee's legal father. The Gang runs the fictional Paddy's Pub, an unsuccessful Irish bar in South Philadelphia.

In the episode, Charlie struggles to get the bar ready for a surprise health inspection of Paddy's Pub as the rest of the Gang prepares a chicken-and-steaks airline mile scam. Featuring an uninterrupted ten-minute long take, the episode garnered critical acclaim from critics and fans and is considered one of the best episodes of the show. Contrary to popular belief, the episode is not a tribute to Birdman, which had not come out when the episode was written and being shot, but rather "Who Goes There", the fourth episode of the first season of True Detective, which featured a similar seven-minute long shot.

== Plot ==
Charlie (Charlie Day) gets tipped off that the health inspector is coming to do a surprise inspection of Paddy's Pub. He alerts Frank (Danny DeVito) and rushes to the bar, only to discover that the Gang is in the midst of an ill-timed airline mile scam involving steaks and live chickens.

Dennis (Glenn Howerton) is painting a sign for Carmine's: A Place for Steaks and Dee (Kaitlin Olson) and Mac (Rob McElhenney) are attempting to wrangle chickens for the fraudulent scheme. Charlie deduces that the Gang used Frank's credit card to buy airline miles, which in turn were used to buy 400 steaks. They plan to contaminate the steaks with chicken feathers by rubbing live chickens all over them so that they can get compensation money from the delivery company. While the plan is underway, Frank reveals he flushed his shoes down the toilet.

Charlie begins barking orders to the Gang, demanding they move all of the chickens into the back office. Charlie works on digging Frank's shoes out of the toilet and covers the glory hole in the men's bathroom. The bar suddenly loses power due to the vacuum sealer being used for the scam. Charlie tells Dennis to use the machine to package lemons and limes. Charlie and Dee go to the basement to test the carbon monoxide detector. To Dee's horror, it begins going off; Charlie explains that he blocks the vents to fill the basement with hazardous gases to clear out the rodents.

The steak delivery truck arrives and the Gang learns that Dee has inadvertently ordered 4,000 steaks instead of the 400 they intended. Charlie has Dee pretend Paddy's Pub is a real restaurant, orders Mac and Dennis to remove the Carmine's sign, and gets Frank to move the truck out of the way while the delivery man is distracted. Charlie leads the delivery man to the back alley under the conceit that it is patio seating.

When the health inspector arrives, Dennis poses as a bartender while Charlie confidently gives her a tour of the premises. Through a series of quick-thinking gambits, Charlie is able to successfully pass off the bar as being in a clean and orderly condition. The rest of the Gang is also able to successfully get the delivery driver to take back the chicken feather-tainted steaks. Charlie is excited about getting a passing grade, but the rest of the Gang reveals that they care more about the steak scheme than the health inspection.

== Production ==
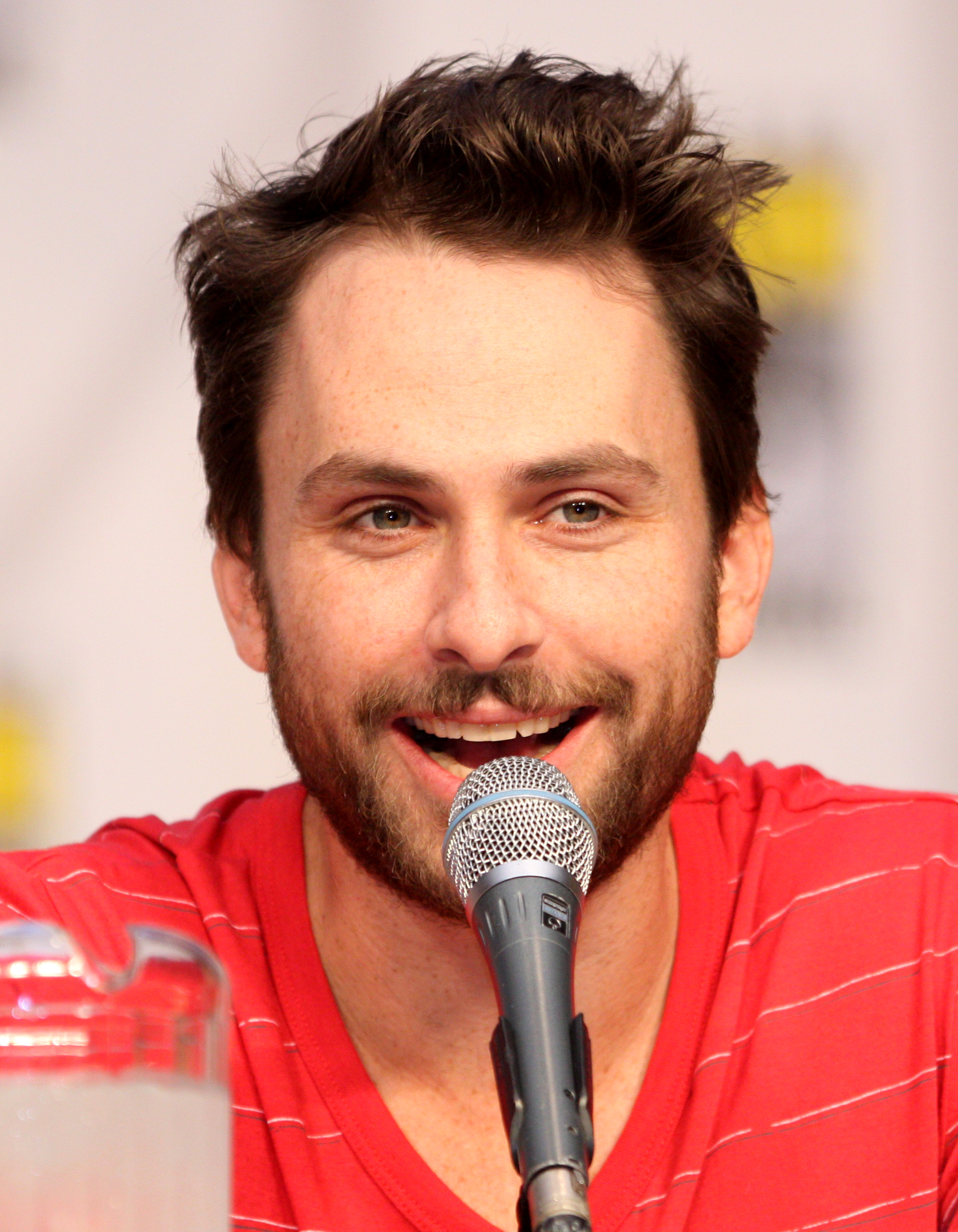
Charlie Day's Charlie Kelly is the central figure in "Charlie Work". Day also co-wrote the episode.

The episode was written by executive producers Charlie Day, Glenn Howerton, and Rob McElhenney. Howerton said the production team was "pretty inspired" by the bravado of the True Detective episode "Who Goes There" and its seven-minute long shot and found "Charlie Work" would be served well by a similar approach, aiming to beat out the episode's long shot by three minutes. The episode's similarity to Birdman with jazz score and continuous tracking shot was entirely coincidental. "We did it like Birdman, even though we didn’t know about Birdman," director Matt Shakman observed.

The ten minute continuous long shot took a lot of preparation and technical effects to pull off. "It was a huge logistical challenge...It's a lot of visual effects to kind of merge things—the front of the pub is a location in downtown L.A., the interior is a set on stage at Fox and some of those sets don't even link up," Shakman explained. "So we had to come up with some trickery and we redesigned our sets so that certain things could be done in the flow."

"The sets on stage are only one level, so every time we go to the basement, there is a camera trick," Shakman noted. "Some are simple–where we pan past the brick wall and hide the cut or go through a pool of darkness–or where we are more ambitious and use green screen (coming back into the bar from the basement for instance was a blend of a shot that panned into a green screen with a shot of the keg room that continued the motion)," Shakman further explained.

"The stage sets that are contiguous are the bathroom, main pub interior, back office, and keg room. The bathroom wasn't originally connected but we made it connect for this episode. For this episode we also built a partial back alley on stage. There's a back alley location in downtown L.A. that we usually go to. We used the real downtown location for when the delivery guy is first seated and Charlie sees DeVito running away. I wanted that to be the actual place so the audience wouldn't doubt the veracity when we used the stage set for later scenes: Charlie arguing with Dee about moving the dumpster and checking in with the inspector in the alley. Going from the interior bar set to the real alley required some green screen and a few camera tricks–going into a wall as Charlie passes, and then coming off the wall on location to reveal the real exterior alley, etc."

== Reception ==
"Charlie Work" is considered to be one of the best Always Sunny episodes. As of February 25, 2025 the episode held an IMDb user rating of 9.8, making it the highest rated episode in the series.

"On a technical level, it's a marvel, as well as a creative look at the genuine odd jobs that Charlie does behind the scenes to protect his friends' livelihoods..." observed Rolling Stone's Noel Murray. Matt Fowler of IGN gave the episode a 10, saying "Charlie Work" was "one of the best episodes the show's ever produced. A fast, frantic laugh-fest featuring outstanding work from Charlie Day." Dennis Perkins of The A.V. Club also praised the episode, saying that "Charlie Day's ability to let Charlie's demons peep through his excitable dialogue is one of Sunny's chief assets, and Day's performance here is pure exhilaration as he wrangles: crates of chickens, 4000 steaks, a clogged toilet, a disabled carbon monoxide detector, a hungry and confused truck driver, a repeatedly blown fuse, a painted Frank blowing a recorder, Mac grunting and apologizing at just the right time, and two separate carjackings to make everything turn out all right."
