= The D.E.N.N.I.S. System =

- It's Always Sunny in Philadelphia episode
- Episode no.: Season 5 Episode 10
- Directed by: Randall Einhorn
- Written by: David Hornsby; Scott Marder; Rob Rosell
- Cinematography by: Peter Smokler
- Editing by: Josh Drisko
- Production code: IP05013
- Original air date: November 19, 2009
- Running time: 22 minutes

Guest appearances
- Mary Elizabeth Ellis as The Waitress; Jill Latiano as Caylee; Travis Schuldt as Ben (the Soldier)

Episode chronology
← Previous "Mac and Dennis Break Up"	Next → "Mac and Charlie Write a Movie"
- It's Always Sunny in Philadelphia season 5

"The D.E.N.N.I.S. System" is the tenth episode of the fifth season of the American television sitcom It's Always Sunny in Philadelphia. It is the 55th overall episode of the series, and was written by co-executive producers David Hornsby, Scott Marder, and Rob Rosell, and directed by Randall Einhorn. It originally aired on FX on November 19, 2009. The episode features Howerton's real life wife, Jill Latiano, as the subject of the titular system.

The series follows "The Gang", a group of five misfit friends: twins Dennis and Deandra "(Sweet) Dee" Reynolds, their friends Charlie Kelly and Mac, and Frank Reynolds, Dennis' and Dee's legal father. The Gang runs the fictional Paddy's Pub, an unsuccessful Irish bar in South Philadelphia.

In the episode, Dennis reveals his foolproof seduction system to The Gang, the titular "D.E.N.N.I.S." system, with the example of Caylee. Charlie tries to use it on the Waitress but doesn't quite grasp the concept. The Gang tells Dee that her boyfriend, Ben, from "The Gang Wrestles for the Troops" is using the system on her, and Mac and Frank reveal their parts in the Dennis' system. The titular system is followed up in the fourth episode of the sixteenth season, "Frank vs. Russia".

== Plot ==
Dennis (Glenn Howerton) walks in on Mac (Rob McElhenney), Frank (Danny DeVito) and Dee (Kaitlin Olson) asking Charlie (Charlie Day) about the Waitress (Mary Elizabeth Ellis), whom he is in love with, and plays them a voicemail message of a woman, Caylee (Jill Latiano), who says she hopes he dies. Dennis claims Caylee is in love with him, but Dee argues otherwise, leading Dennis to explain his system for seduction to The Gang, called "The D.E.N.N.I.S. System."

Dennis explains that he met Caylee at the pharmacy when he pretended to buy pills for his sick grandma, which is the first step of the system (Demonstrate value). He convinces her to have pizza at his place, where they soon have sex (Engage physically). He then creates a fake threatening neighbor to scare Caylee and makes her depend on him (Nurturing dependence), only to soon neglect with her as she grows more attached (Neglect emotionally). Dennis romantically shows up to Caylee's window and begs for forgiveness (Inspire hope), and they later have sex again, before he sneaks out in the middle of the night with the intention to never talk to her again (Separate entirely). He claims that the system leaves the girls loving him more than they would've before, but Dee, skeptical, challenges him to follow through with the system and get Caylee back. The Gang then convinces Dee that her boyfriend, Ben (Travis Schuldt), is using the system on her.

After Dennis fails to win back Caylee, Mac and Frank tell him that they have a system where they have sex with the girl after Dennis. Ben takes Dee out on a picnic, but she runs away after fearing that he's using the system on her, and spends the night in the bush. Charlie, misunderstanding the system, breaks into the Waitress' apartment and offers to fix her garbage disposal that he broke. Dennis then devises a plan to fix everyone's respective problems by going to the carnival. At the carnival, Dennis hires an elderly lady to pretend to be his grandma in an attempt to win back Caylee, while Charlie fails to impress the Waitress and Frank dresses up as Dennis' pretend doctor. Dee gets stabbed by a carnival worker while flirting with him to make Ben jealous. In the end, Dennis' plans for him to win back Caylee, Charlie to win over the Waitress and Dee to make Ben jealous all fail.

== Production ==
The episode was directed by Randall Einhorn, and was written by co-executive producers David Hornsby, Scott Marder, and Rob Rosell. The episode features Howerton's real life wife, Jill Latiano as Caylee, though they weren't married at the time of filming.

== Analysis ==
The titular D.E.N.N.I.S system itself was subject to a chapter by Roger Hunt in It's Always Sunny and Philosophy: The Gang Gets Analyzed, and compares it to how philosophers think. He compares step "D" to how they approach an issue, by "understand[ing] the issue and our own capacity to present an enlightening discussion of it."

== Reception ==
The episode was watched by 1.49 million viewers on its initial airing. It was received generally positively, with IGN saying "Always Sunny was out in full force", although contrastingly stating "a large chunk in the middle ... just felt flat". They rated the episode a "good" 7.8/10. The A.V. Club called it an "amusingly intricate plot", while also commenting on it being "little lighter on laughs than" the previous episodes, and giving it a B+. Entertainment Weekly and Rolling Stone rated the episode 6th and 18th on their respective lists of 20 Best It's Always Sunny in Philadelphia episodes.
