= Lower Learning =

- DVD cover
- Directed by: Mark Lafferty
- Written by: Shahin Chandrasoma; Mark Lafferty
- Produced by: Matthew Leutwyler; Sim Sarna
- Starring: Jason Biggs; Eva Longoria; Rob Corddry
- Cinematography: David Robert Jones
- Edited by: Shawna Callahan
- Music by: Ryan Shore
- Production companies: Ambush Entertainment; Starz Media
- Distributed by: Anchor Bay Entertainment
- Release date: October 10, 2008
- Running time: 97 minutes
- Country: United States
- Language: English
- Budget: $2 million
- Box office: $2,804

Lower Learning is a 2008 American black comedy film starring Jason Biggs, Eva Longoria, Rob Corddry, Ryan Newman, Monica Potter, and Andy Pessoa. It was directed by Mark Lafferty, and written by Lafferty and Shahin Chandrasoma. The film's original score was composed by Ryan Shore.

== Plot ==
Geraldine Ferraro Elementary, one of the worst schools in the state, is in danger of being closed. The school suffers from low test results, drunken teachers, and a corrupt principal. The Vice Principal, Tom Willoman (Jason Biggs), decides to try to save the school. When he finds out that the school inspector is a childhood friend, he recruits her to help him save the school, by rallying the teachers and students against the principal.

== Cast ==
- Jason Biggs as Vice Principal Tom Willoman
- Eva Longoria as Rebecca Seabrook
- Rob Corddry as Principal Harper Billings
- Monica Potter as Laura Buchwald
- Will Sasso as Jesse Buchwald
- Nat Faxon as Turner Abernathy
- Jill Latiano as Nurse Gretchyn
- Kyle Gass as Decatur Doublewide
- Hayes MacArthur as Digdug O'Shaughnessy
- Zachary Gordon as Frankie Fowler
- Ed Helms as Maurice Bunting
- Patricia Belcher as Colette Bamboo
- Jack Donner as Old Curt
- Sandy Martin as Olympia Parpadelle
- Erik Palladino as Smooth Bob Willoman
- Matt Walsh as Mr. Conroy
- Miranda Bailey as Melody
- Ryan Newman as Carlotta
- Andy Pessoa as Walter
- Kiernan Shipka as Sarah

== Release ==
Lower Learning was released theatrically at a single theater showing on October 10, 2008, and made $2,804 in domestic grosses.

== Home media ==
The film was released on DVD on December 2, 2008.
