= It's Always Sunny in Philadelphia season 9 =

2013 season of American television series

It's Always Sunny in Philadelphia
- Season 9
- DVD cover
- Starring: Charlie Day; Glenn Howerton; Rob McElhenney; Kaitlin Olson; Danny DeVito
- No. of episodes: 10

Release
- Original network: FXX
- Original release: September 4 – November 6, 2013

Season chronology
- ← Previous; Season 8 Next → Season 10

The ninth season of the American television sitcom series It's Always Sunny in Philadelphia premiered on the new channel FXX on September 4, 2013. The season consists of 10 episodes, and concluded airing on November 6, 2013. The ninth season was released on DVD in region 1 on September 2, 2014.

== Cast ==
=== Main cast ===
- Charlie Day as Charlie Kelly
- Glenn Howerton as Dennis Reynolds
- Rob McElhenney as Mac
- Kaitlin Olson as Deandra "Dee" Reynolds
- Danny DeVito as Frank Reynolds

=== Special guest cast ===
- Seann William Scott as Country Mac

=== Recurring cast ===
- Mary Elizabeth Ellis as The Waitress
- Artemis Pebdani as Artemis

=== Guest stars ===
- Ken Davitian as Snyder
- Peter Jacobson as Rotenberg
- Lavell Crawford as Landslide
- Robyn Lively as Kerry
- Dave Foley as Principal MacIntyre
- Mickey Jones as Gunther
- Andrew Friedman as Jack Kelly
- Jeff Kober as Creepy Guy
- Karl T. Wright as Scott
- Roger Bart as Rep
- Oscar Nunez as Sudz Manager
- Chad L. Coleman as Z
- Artemis Pebdani as Artemis
- Ryan Gaul as Greg
- Tommy Dewey as Harris Marder
- Travis Schuldt as Ben the Soldier
- Roddy Piper as Da' Maniac
- Josh Groban as Himself
- Jessica Collins as Jackie Denardo
- Peter Mackenzie as Doctor ("The Gang Saves the Day")
- T.J. Hoban as Angel/Rex
- Jim O'Heir as Doctor ("The Gang Gets Quarantined")
- Jimmy Ouyang as Tang-See
- Burn Gorman as Scientist
- Jimmi Simpson as Liam McPoyle
- Nate Mooney as Ryan McPoyle
- Shelly Desai as Hwang
- David Hornsby as Cricket
- Mary Lynn Rajskub as Gail the Snail
- Zachary Knighton as Random Guy
- Lance Barber as Bill Ponderosa

== Production ==
On August 6, 2011, FX announced it had picked up the show for a ninth season. It premiered on the new FXX channel and moved timeslots to Wednesday nights.

On May 14, 2013, Rob McElhenney revealed that Game of Thrones series creators David Benioff and D. B. Weiss guest-wrote an episode of the ninth season. Charlie Day revealed it would be a Flowers for Algernon type of story about "Charlie getting smarter" in a Limitless style, and is called "Flowers for Charlie".

In addition, there is an episode called "The Gang Tries Desperately to Win an Award", which mocks the show's lack of nominations for Emmys and other awards, a Lethal Weapon 6 episode follow-up, and a Thanksgiving special, which brings back Gail the Snail, The McPoyles and other enemies of the Gang. An animated sequence (inspired by a Pixar animation) was created for the 100th episode, "The Gang Saves the Day".

An Aaron Paul cameo was announced, but he was not able to appear due to scheduling conflicts.

Rob McElhenney revealed at the 2013 San Diego Comic-Con that he had written an episode for this season involving the gang becoming contestants on the game show Family Feud. While Family Feud producers were receptive to the storyline, FX refused to allow the episode to proceed to production.

The season premiered on September 4, 2013, and contains 10 episodes. The series' landmark 100th episode aired on October 9.

== Episodes ==
No. overall	No. in season	Title	Directed by	Written by	Original release date	Prod. code	US viewers (millions)
95	1	"The Gang Broke Dee"	Richie Keen	Charlie Day & Glenn Howerton & Rob McElhenney	September 4, 2013	XIP09001	0.757
Dee is suicidally depressed after realizing the guys were right about her looks and lack of talent. To snap her out of it, Dennis tries to find a man in her league while Charlie, Mac, and Frank encourage Dee to give her stand-up career another shot, which turns her into an overnight hit when the crowd loves her crude, self-deprecating jokes.
96	2	"Gun Fever Too: Still Hot"	Todd Biermann	Charlie Day & Glenn Howerton & Rob McElhenney	September 11, 2013	XIP09005	0.606
The gang again tangles with gun-control issues when Frank appears on a local-access talk show advocating the right to bear arms.
97	3	"The Gang Tries Desperately to Win an Award"	Richie Keen	David Hornsby	September 18, 2013	XIP09003	0.521
In a clever jab at the show never being nominated for the Emmy Awards, the gang tries to make their bar worthy of a Philly Best Bar Award.
98	4	"Mac and Dennis Buy a Timeshare"	Dan Attias	Dave Chernin & John Chernin	September 25, 2013	XIP09008	0.458
Dee and Charlie get roped into a pyramid scheme and try to get themselves out of it by scamming Ben the Soldier and others; Frank is stuck in a playground coil, but nobody rescues him because they think it's a trick.
99	5	"Mac Day"	Richie Keen	Charlie Day & Glenn Howerton & Rob McElhenney	October 2, 2013	XIP09004	0.459
Each Gang member gets his/her own day to do whatever they want with no complaints from the others, so Mac uses his day to give the others a religious experience, but they take a shine to his cousin "Country Mac" (Seann William Scott) who, unlike regular Mac, is honest about his homosexuality, doesn't push his religious beliefs on others, and treats the others with respect.
100	6	"The Gang Saves the Day"	Dan Attias	Dave Chernin & John Chernin	October 9, 2013	XIP09007	0.509
A robber bursts into the convenience store where the Gang are shopping and holds it up. While hiding in an aisle, Mac, Dee, Dennis, Frank, and Charlie each imagine how each of them would save the day.
101	7	"The Gang Gets Quarantined"	Heath Cullens	David Hornsby	October 16, 2013	XIP09010	0.574
After Frank announces that there's a flu epidemic in Philadelphia, the Gang quarantines themselves in the bar, where Frank becomes obsessed with purifying himself: he locks the others in a bathroom and overuses hand-sanitizer
102	8	"Flowers for Charlie"	Dan Attias	David Benioff & D. B. Weiss	October 23, 2013	XIP09009	0.460
A Flowers for Algernon-meets-Limitless parody finds Charlie being used as a test subject for a new intelligence pill that makes him smarter and more aware of his messed-up life, causing him to quit his janitor job. Meanwhile, Dee, Dennis, and Mac try to do Charlie's work but get sidetracked and high on gasoline; and Frank tries to bring Charlie back to his dimwitted self.
103	9	"The Gang Makes Lethal Weapon 6"	Dan Attias	Scott Marder	October 30, 2013	XIP09006	0.427
The Gang tries to find funding for Lethal Weapon 6 after Frank backs out due to creative differences.
104	10	"The Gang Squashes Their Beefs"	Todd Biermann	Rob Rosell	November 6, 2013	XIP09002	0.535
The Gang invites their enemies to Thanksgiving dinner so they can forgive them for everything they've done to them.

== Reception ==
=== Critical response ===
The ninth season received positive reviews. On Rotten Tomatoes, it has an approval rating of 100% with an average score of 7.7 out of 10 based on 22 reviews. The website's critical consensus reads, "Dee hits rock bottom and Charlie gets smart in a consistently hilarious ninth season that proves the Gang doesn't need an award to be one of television's funniest ensembles."

=== Ratings ===
The first episode of the season premiered with the lowest number of U.S. viewers since it has been tracked for the show. This was primarily due to the new channel, FXX, being unavailable from many television providers. Many Suddenlink Communications franchises, although carrying the channel, have required the subscriber to buy a "Sports Package" in order to receive the network. Nonetheless, FX Network president John Landgraf said that "the numbers last night [...] far exceeded our highest expectations" and that "To have just launched the channel three days ago and get these ratings is thrilling."

== Home media ==
It's Always Sunny in Philadelphia: The Complete Season Nine
Set details	Special features
10 episodes; 2-disc set (Region 1); Technical specifications: Anamorphic Widescreen (1.78:1); English Dolby Digital 5.1; English SDH, French, Spanish subtitles	Sweet Dee's Comedy Reel; The Invigaron Presentation; Lethal Weapon 6: Director's Cut; The Gang Does 100 Episodes; Every Damn Take of Charlie's Theme Song; Audio commentaries on select episodes; Gag reel
Release date
Region 1
September 2, 2014
