= Hero or Hate Crime? =

- It's Always Sunny in Philadelphia episode
- Episode no.: Season 12; Episode 6
- Directed by: Jamie Babbit
- Written by: Charlie Day; Glenn Howerton; Rob McElhenney
- Cinematography by: John Tanzer
- Editing by: Tim Roche
- Production code: XIP12002
- Original air date: February 8, 2017
- Running time: 22 minutes

Guest appearances
- Kari Coleman as Margie; Dan Donohue as Phil

Episode chronology
← Previous "Making Dennis Reynolds a Murderer"	Next → "PTSDee"
- It's Always Sunny in Philadelphia season 12

"Hero or Hate Crime?" is the sixth episode of the twelfth season of the American television sitcom It's Always Sunny in Philadelphia. It is the 130th overall episode of the series, and was written by executive producers Charlie Day, Glenn Howerton and series creator Rob McElhenney, and directed by Jamie Babbit. It originally aired on FXX on February 8, 2017.

The series follows "The Gang", a group of five misfit friends: twins Dennis and Deandra "(Sweet) Dee" Reynolds, their friends Charlie Kelly and Ronald "Mac" McDonald, and Frank Reynolds, Dennis' and Dee's legal father. The Gang runs the fictional Paddy's Pub, an unsuccessful Irish bar in South Philadelphia.

In the episode, The Gang goes to arbitration to determine the rightful owner of a lost scratch-off lottery ticket and prove whether Frank using a homophobic slur against Mac to save him from getting crushed by a piano is considered a heroic act or a hate crime.

== Plot ==
While Mac (Rob McElhenney) and Charlie (Charlie Day) go for a walk, Dennis (Glenn Howerton) watches as a scratch-off lottery ticket that Dee (Kaitlin Olson) purchased flies out of her bag. Mac sees the lottery ticket and goes to pick it up as a piano is lifted above him. Frank (Danny DeVito) watches the rope holding the piano break, and warns Mac by shouting "look out, faggot" and Charlie kicks Mac out of the way. While Frank praises himself for saving Mac's life, The Gang accuses him of a hate crime.

To settle the dispute, they hire an arbiter (Dan Donohue) to decide who has ownership over the lottery ticket. After the arbiter asks that they treat each other with respect and common courtesy, they hire a different one (Karen Y. McClain). Dee explains that she bought the ticket two weeks earlier, but hadn't scratched it so that she wouldn't be a loser. Dennis then exposes that Dee has been spending the money he gave her to give as a tip to the girl who works at the convenience store on "impulse buys", such as the ticket, and that he is the rightful owner, as it was paid for with his money. Charlie claims he deserves the ticket for saving Mac's life by kicking him, though Mac claims he would've backflipped and survived anyway.

Frank then claims he deserves the ticket for warning Mac and Charlie about the piano in the first place, but The Gang disputes this due to his use of the f-slur. Dennis explains that Frank used the slur to describe Mac because Mac is gay, despite Mac's continued insistence that he's straight. The second arbiter tells The Gang that she will make a decision based on fairness and compromise, so they hire a third arbiter (Kari Coleman), who decides on a 50/50 split between Frank and Mac. She says that since Mac doesn't claim to be gay, Frank's use of the slur isn't technically hate speech, so Mac comes out as gay, and receives the entire ticket. After Mac wins the ticket which has a $10,000 prize; he decides to stay "out of the closet", and accepts being gay. After the cost of the bill that Mac has to pay, it is revealed that he only won $14.

== Production ==
It's Always Sunny in Philadelphia was renewed for an eleventh and twelfth season on April 4, 2014, each to consist of 10 episodes. The episode was directed by Jamie Babbit, and was written by executive producers Charlie Day and Glenn Howerton, with series creator Rob McElhenney, all of whom are main actors in the series.

== Reception ==
The episode was watched by 551,000 viewers on its initial airing. It was received positively, with IGN rating it a "great" 8.8/10, and called the episode "awesome". Vulture described the episode as a "weirdly elegant metaphor for the show itself and its uniquely inflammatory brand of social criticism."
