= It's Always Sunny in Philadelphia season 5 =

2009 season of American television series

It's Always Sunny in Philadelphia
- Season 5
- DVD cover
- Starring: Charlie Day; Glenn Howerton; Rob McElhenney; Kaitlin Olson; Danny DeVito
- No. of episodes: 12

Release
- Original network: FX
- Original release: September 17 – December 10, 2009

Season chronology
- ← Previous; Season 4 Next → Season 6

The fifth season of the American television sitcom series It's Always Sunny in Philadelphia premiered on FX on September 17, 2009. The season contains 12 episodes and concluded airing on December 10, 2009. Beginning with this season, the series' aspect ratio was changed from 4:3 to 16:9.

== Cast ==
=== Main cast ===
- Charlie Day as Charlie Kelly
- Glenn Howerton as Dennis Reynolds
- Rob McElhenney as Mac
- Kaitlin Olson as Deandra "Dee" Reynolds
- Danny DeVito as Frank Reynolds

=== Recurring cast ===
- Mary Elizabeth Ellis as The Waitress
- Lynne Marie Stewart as Bonnie Kelly
- Artemis Pebdani as Artemis Dubois

=== Guest stars ===
- Ben Koldyke as Sean
- Melanie Lynskey as Kate
- Brian Unger as The Attorney
- P.J. Byrne as Tad
- Ray Porter as Gerry
- Cha Cha Ciarcia as Fruit Vendor
- Shannon McKain as Hitchhiker
- Andrew Friedman as Uncle Jack
- Nora Dunn as Donna
- Mary Lynn Rajskub as Gail the Snail
- Suzy Nakamura as Tabitha
- Sandy Martin as Mrs. Mac
- Nick Wechsler as Brad
- Joy Osmanski as Jackie
- Nasim Pedrad as Lucy
- Patricia Belcher as Judge
- David Hornsby as Rickety Cricket
- Roddy Piper as Da' Maniac
- Travis Schuldt as Ben The Soldier
- Jill Latiano as Caylee
- Mae Laborde as Gladys
- Lex Medlin as A.D.
- Kunal Sharma as Faisal
- Marshall Allman as Bezzy
- Noah Bean as Art Sloan
- Cody Kasch as Cheesefoot

== Episodes ==
No. overall	No. in season	Title	Directed by	Written by	Original release date	Prod. code	US viewers (millions)
46	1	"The Gang Exploits the Mortgage Crisis"	Randall Einhorn	Becky Mann & Audra Sielaff	September 17, 2009	IP05008	2.24
While Frank, Mac, and Dennis try their hand at real estate, Dee arranges to be a surrogate mother to a wealthy couple with a pool; Charlie faces off with a lawyer on the intricacies of the judicial system.
47	2	"The Gang Hits the Road"	Fred Savage	Glenn Howerton & Charlie Day	September 24, 2009	IP05005	1.79
The Gang tries to expand their horizons by going on a road trip to the Grand Canyon. Despite the guys' attempts to leave Dee behind, the entire group travels in Dee's small car and the back of a U-HAUL trailer, making many stops along the way: bathroom stops, the Italian Market to buy furniture for the trailer and fruit for Charlie, and picking up a hitchhiker.
48	3	"The Great Recession"	Fred Savage	David Hornsby	October 1, 2009	IP05007	2.01
Frank attempts suicide because of a recent financial loss he attributes to the recession. Mac and Dennis deal with the economic strain by making Charlie and Dee prove their worth; when they can't, Dee quits and Charlie gets fired. Dee then teams up with Frank, who feels better after financially cutting off the Gang, to start a business; the business fails and the good feeling flees. Mac and Dennis try to emulate the Dave & Buster's business model with newly-impoverished Americans who are residing in RVs by the bar. Meanwhile, Charlie tries to move back in with his mother but the condition that he must share a room with Uncle Jack drives him to choose a cardboard box.
49	4	"The Gang Gives Frank an Intervention"	Fred Savage	Scott Marder & Rob Rosell	October 8, 2009	IP05006	1.51
Dennis, Charlie, and Dee stage an intervention on Frank because they no longer enjoy drinking with him; trying to become as depraved as possible, Frank tries to seduce his former sister-in-law (Nora Dunn), whom Mac also pursues while Dennis and Dee deal with their bizarre cousin "Gail the Snail" (Mary Lynn Rajskub).
50	5	"The Waitress Is Getting Married"	Fred Savage	Glenn Howerton & Charlie Day	October 15, 2009	IP05004	1.61
Jealous that The Waitress is marrying her former boyfriend Brad Fisher (Nick Wechsler), whom she cruelly dumped because of his acne—Dee tries to derail the wedding, enlisting help from Frank, Artemis, Mrs. Kelly, and Mrs. Mac. Fearful that Charlie will lose his mind and take it out on them, Dennis and Mac try to find him a girlfriend with online dating. Dee learns that The Waitress went to high school with her ("... you really are forgettable.")
51	6	"The World Series Defense"	Randall Einhorn	David Hornsby	October 22, 2009	IP05014	1.61
The Gang describes the tribulations they endured during Game 5 of the World Series, hoping that the judge will clear them of all the citations they received.
52	7	"The Gang Wrestles for the Troops"	Randall Einhorn	Scott Marder & Rob Rosell	October 29, 2009	IP05012	1.35
There's nothing more American than wrestling, so the Gang decides to put on a wrestling show for the returning troops; Frank wants to go along as the Trashman, but the others disapprove. Meanwhile, the soldier (Travis Schuldt) Dee has been chatting with online is not what she expected. Roddy Piper guest stars.
53	8	"Paddy's Pub: Home of the Original Kitten Mittens"	Randall Einhorn	Sonny Lee & Patrick Walsh	November 5, 2009	IP05011	1.99
When a merchandising convention comes to town, the Gang tries to develop marketable products, such as Kitten Mittens, Nudey Pens, Dick Towels, and "Shot"guns in an attempt to build the Paddy's brand, and try to blackmail The Lawyer into helping them.
54	9	"Mac and Dennis Break Up"	Fred Savage	Scott Marder & Rob Rosell	November 12, 2009	IP05003	1.87
Mac and Dennis decide to spend some time apart after Dee compares them to an old married couple; Charlie lends his feline expertise to help Dee get her cat out of a wall.
55	10	"The D.E.N.N.I.S. System"	Randall Einhorn	David Hornsby & Scott Marder & Rob Rosell	November 19, 2009	IP05013	1.49
Dennis reveals his foolproof seduction system to the Gang; Charlie tries to use it on The Waitress but doesn't quite grasp the concept; the Gang tells Dee that her boyfriend from "The Gang Wrestles for the Troops" is using the system on her; Mac and Frank reveal their parts in the system.
56	11	"Mac and Charlie Write a Movie"	Randall Einhorn	Glenn Howerton & Rob McElhenney	December 3, 2009	IP05009	1.89
When Dee gets a part in the new M. Night Shyamalan film, Mac and Charlie seize the chance to pitch their movie script, Frank takes on the role of a talent agent, and although Dennis participates, he spends the whole time typing on his phone.
57	12	"The Gang Reignites the Rivalry"	Randall Einhorn	Dave Chernin & Charlie Day	December 10, 2009	IP05010	1.68
After a 10-year ban from a local drinking competition, "Flipadelphia," the gang tries to reignite their old rivalry with another local bar. Needing serious practice, the guys head to Dennis' old fraternity house at the University of Pennsylvania to get their game up to speed, only to find new rivals. Meanwhile, Dee hones her skills on her own.

== Reception ==
The fifth season received positive reviews. On Rotten Tomatoes, it has an approval rating of 94% with an average score of 8 out of 10 based on 17 reviews. The website's critical consensus reads, "The Gang comes to accept their rotten lot in life and It's Always Sunny settles into a morbidly pleasurable groove as a comedy of foiled dreams and dunderheaded schemes."

== Home media ==
It's Always Sunny in Philadelphia: The Complete Season 5
Set details	Special features
12 episodes; 3-disc DVD set, 2-disc Blu-ray set (Region 1 & 4); Technical specifications: Anamorphic Widescreen (1.78:1); English Dolby Surround (DVD), DTS-HD Master Audio 5.1 (Blu-ray); English SDH, French, Spanish, Portuguese subtitles	Six Audio Commentaries: "The Gang Hits the Road" "The Gang Give Frank an Intervention" "The Waitress Is Getting Married" "The Gang Wrestles for the Troops" "Mac and Dennis Break Up" "The Gang Reignites the Rivalry": Phindin' Love in Philly: The Gang's Dating Profiles; Kitten Mittens Endless Loop; 23,793 Photos in 5 Minutes – Dream Sequence Montage; Extended/Uncensored scenes and alternate takes; Blooper reel; Archer Pilot episode
Release dates
Region 1	Region 4
September 14, 2010	February 29, 2012
