= Chardee MacDennis: The Game of Games =

- It's Always Sunny in Philadelphia episode
- Episode no.: Season 7 Episode 7
- Directed by: Matt Shakman
- Written by: Charlie Day; Rob McElhenney
- Cinematography by: Peter Smokler
- Editing by: Josh Drisko
- Production code: XIP07001
- Original air date: January 27, 2011
- Running time: 22 minutes

Episode chronology
← Previous "The Storm of the Century"	Next → "The ANTI-Social Network"
- It's Always Sunny in Philadelphia season 7

"Chardee MacDennis: The Game of Games" is the seventh episode of the seventh season of the American television sitcom It's Always Sunny in Philadelphia. It is the 78th overall episode of the series, and was written by executive producer Charlie Day and series creator Rob McElhenney, and directed by co-executive producer Matt Shakman. It originally aired on FX on October 27, 2011. It is a bottle episode, taking place in Paddy's Pub.

The series follows "The Gang", a group of five misfit friends: twins Dennis and Deandra "(Sweet) Dee" Reynolds, their friends Charlie Kelly and Mac, and Frank Reynolds, Dennis' and Dee's legal father. The Gang runs the fictional Paddy's Pub, an unsuccessful Irish bar in South Philadelphia.

In the episode, out of boredom, Dee and Dennis face off against Mac, Charlie and Frank in "Chardee MacDennis", a twisted board game they developed years ago. A follow up to the episode aired on January 6, 2016, as the eleventh season premiere, titled "Chardee MacDennis 2: Electric Boogaloo".

== Plot ==
Dennis (Glenn Howerton), Dee (Kaitlin Olson), Frank (Danny DeVito), Charlie (Charlie Day) and Mac (Rob McElhenney) hang out at Paddy's Pub, bored. Dennis suggest to cure their boredom with a board game they created called "Chardee MacDennis". Dennis and Mac explain the rules of the game to Frank. It has three levels: mind (trivia, puzzles, and artistry), body (physical challenge, pain, and endurance), and spirit (emotional battery and public humiliation). The prize for winning the game is that the victors are allowed to smash the losers' pieces. Frank joins Mac and Charlie's team.

The games begin with a "Pre-Game Wine and Cheese Reception", where each team toasts to each other politely and respectfully. The Gang throws their wine glasses on the ground as the timer runs out, and they scream war chants at their opponents. The game transitions to the first level, mind. Dee correctly answers a trivia question asked by Dennis, and Dennis steals a question and correctly answer a question from Mac to Charlie. From an artistry card, Charlie correctly guesses the clue drawn on his back by Frank. Mac tries to trick The Gang with a chance card he reads as "take the money from everyone's pockets", but is exposed by Frank for lying. The timer is stopped, and Dennis and Dee advance to the next level, body, by default, due to Mac cheating.

Before level 2, The Gang enjoys "The Pre-Level 2 Break", where they toast with beer. Mac explains to Frank that in level 2, swearing is prohibited. Level 2 begins with Charlie and Mac throwing darts at a target while Dennis' hand covers the bullseye. After four attempts, Frank throws a dart right through Dennis' palm, but he doesn't flinch, thus winning the card. Frank draws a jail chance card, resulting in him being confined to a dog kennel, and he can only leave by eating the raw ingredients of a cake. The Gang then plays real life Hungry Hungry Hippos with grapes. Dee wins with 5 grapes, due to Charlie swallowing all of his from not understanding the rules.

Now in "The Pre-Level 3 Break", Frank escapes the kennel after eating the cake ingredients. Level 3, spirit, begins, and Frank knocks over Dennis' liquor glass, making Charlie and Mac drink Dennis and Dee's drinks as punishment. Charlie and Mac realize that Dennis and Dee's drinks are water, not liquor, and that they have been cheating. Due to their cheating, Frank, Mac and Charlie jump to level 3. In all the excitement, the timer goes off, meaning they have to draw the black card. The black card explains that the winner of the game will be decided by a coin flip. Frank flips a coin, and it lands on heads, crowning Dennis and Dee as the winners.

== Production ==
The episode was directed by co-executive producer Matt Shakman, who directed all episodes in the season, and was written by executive producer Charlie Day and series creator Rob McElhenney, both of whom are main actors in the series.

== Reception ==
The episode was watched by 1.38 million viewers on its initial airing. When it first aired, it received mixed reviews. IGN called it "charming", and rated it 8/10, while TV Fanatic rated the episode 3/5, calling it "one of the weakest episodes so far this season."

Since its initial airing, the episode has garnered positive reviews. Rolling Stone (in 2015) and Entertainment Weekly (in 2022) rated the episode third and tenth on their respective lists of 20 Best It's Always Sunny in Philadelphia episodes.
