= Reynolds vs. Reynolds: The Cereal Defense =

- It's Always Sunny in Philadelphia episode
- Episode no.: Season 8 Episode 10
- Directed by: Richie Keen
- Written by: Charlie Day; Glenn Howerton; Rob McElhenney
- Cinematography by: Peter Smokler
- Editing by: Tim Roche
- Production code: XIP08010
- Original air date: December 20, 2012
- Running time: 22 minutes

Episode chronology
← Previous "The Gang Dines Out"	Next → "The Gang Broke Dee"
- It's Always Sunny in Philadelphia season 8

"Reynolds vs. Reynolds: The Cereal Defense" is the tenth and final episode of the eighth season of the American television sitcom It's Always Sunny in Philadelphia. It is the 94th overall episode of the series, and was written by executive producers Charlie Day, Glenn Howerton and series creator Rob McElhenney, and directed by Richie Keen. It originally aired on FX on December 20, 2012, and was the last episode of the series to be aired on the network before it was moved to FXX the next year.

The series follows "The Gang", a group of five misfit friends: twins Dennis and Deandra "(Sweet) Dee" Reynolds, their friends Charlie Kelly and Ronald "Mac" McDonald, and Frank Reynolds, Dennis' and Dee's legal father. The Gang runs the fictional Paddy's Pub, an unsuccessful Irish bar in South Philadelphia.

In this episode, Frank and Dennis stage a mock trial after Frank crashes his car into Dennis' while Dennis was eating cereal at a red light. Dee initially acts as Dennis' lawyer, and Charlie as Frank's, with Mac being the judge/bailiff.

== Plot ==
While parked at a red traffic light, Dennis (Glenn Howerton) is eating cereal in his car when Frank (Danny DeVito) crashes into him. This causes Dennis to spill his cereal all over the inside of his car. Due to their dispute over whether or not Frank will pay for the damages, The Gang decides to throw a mock trial to decide the outcome. Dee (Kaitlin Olson) acts as Dennis' lawyer, and Charlie (Charlie Day) acts as Frank's, with Mac (Rob McElhenney) as the judge/bailiff.

Firstly, Charlie, defending Frank, gets Dennis to admit that anyone who is "donkey-brained" would be unsafe to drive. Charlie then produces a legal document from Frank's childhood which says Frank doesn't have "donkey brains" after he was wrongfully committed to a mental institution. Charlie uses the document to prove Frank's sound state of mind, while arguing that Dennis' lack of such a document means he could be a "donkey-brained man".

Dennis begins his argument by offering Frank a glass of wine. He then hits Frank, causing him to spill the wine. Dennis claims the accident was his fault, and that he'd pay for the damages. Mac then argues that Frank assumed responsibility when he took the wine, and that he knew risks, meaning it was his fault for the incident. Dee then challenges the argument by questioning Mac's credibility as a witness. Dee manipulates Charlie's feelings towards Mac by bringing up their disagreements on superheroes. Dee attempts to get Mac to admit that he believes he could create a race of superhumans through evolution to change Charlie's opinion, but Mac explains he was joking, and that it could never happen in the real world. Dennis questions Mac's reasoning for not believing in superhumans, to which he answers that evolution doesn't exist.

Three hours later, Mac brings out a poster he made in an attempt to convince The Gang that evolution is a lie. Dennis tells Mac that he'll never convince them that evolution isn't real because all the smartest scientists say it's real, to which Mac lists examples of when scientists have been wrong, discrediting Aristotle, Galileo and Isaac Newton. Mac compares his faith in the Bible to Dennis' faith in science, which sways The Gang to have doubts about evolution. After not reaching an agreement, Frank and Dennis perform a re-enactment of the incident, where Frank crashes into Dennis' car again. The Gang (except Dee) unanimously decides that Dee is at fault, and should pay for the damages.

== Production ==
The episode was directed by Richie Keen, and was written by executive producers Charlie Day and Glenn Howerton, with series creator Rob McElhenney, all of whom are main actors in the series.

== Reception ==
The episode was watched by 0.94 million viewers on its initial airing. The episode received positive reviews from critics. IGN called the episode "doing what they do best", and rated it 8.6/10. Paste rated the episode 7.9/10.
