= Jill Latiano =

American actress, model, dancer

- Occupations: Actress; model; dancer; television personality; documentary film producer
- Years active: 1999–present
- Spouse: Glenn Howerton (m. 2009)
- Children: 2

Jill Latiano Howerton is an American actress, model, dancer, documentary film producer and television personality.

== Career ==
Latiano began her career in 1999 as a dancer for the New York Knicks. From 2003 to 2005, she was the host of the NYC Media series Fashion in Focus. She made her acting debut in an episode of Sex and the City in 2004. She has guest starred in Rescue Me, CSI: NY, Ugly Betty, Drake & Josh, Moonlight, and Community. She appeared in the films Epic Movie (2007), Lower Learning (2008), Fired Up (2009), and the psychological thriller Kalamity (2010).

She also has produced multiple documentary films of varying impact, including GMO OMG, which spread the assertion that the use of genetically modified organisms in food production is harmful to children, as well as The Devil We Know, investigating DuPont's cover-ups of the harmful effects of PFAS it was releasing into West Virginia communities' groundwater.

== Personal life ==
Latiano married Glenn Howerton on September 5, 2009. She also guest starred in Howerton's series It's Always Sunny in Philadelphia, playing a love interest to his character in the episode "The D.E.N.N.I.S. System". They have two children.

== Filmography ==
=== Film ===
Year	Title	Role	Notes
2007	Epic Movie	Singing Pirate Girl	
2008	Lower Learning	Nurse Gretchen	
2009	Fired Up!	Haley	
2010	Kalamity	Simge	
2022	The Thief Collector	—N/a	Producer

=== Television ===
Year	Title	Role	Notes
2003	Fashion in Focus	Host	Television documentary
2004	Sex and the City	Party Girl #2	Episode: "Let There Be Light"
2004	Rescue Me	Geneva	2 episodes
2005	Out of Practice	Wendy	Episode: "Breaking Up Is Hard to Do. And Do. And..."
2006	Heist	Tiffany	Episode: "Bury the Lead"
2006	CSI: NY	Mandy Foster	Episode: "Open and Shut"
2006–2007	Ugly Betty	Assistant #1 / Blonde / Model	3 episodes
2007	Drake & Josh	Diana Vosh	Episode: "Megan's Revenge"
2007	Dirty Sexy Money	Bridget	Episode: "The Bridge"
2007	The Virgin of Akron, Ohio	Raleigh	Television film; unsold pilot
2008	Moonlight	The Cleaner	Episode: "The Mortal Cure"
2009	Roommates	Jackie	2 episodes
2009	It's Always Sunny in Philadelphia	Caylee	Episode: "The D.E.N.N.I.S. System"
2010	Community	Courtney	Episode: "Physical Education"
2011	The Chicago Code	Natalie	Episode: "O'Leary's Cow"
2011	The Cleveland Show	Anna	Episode: "A Nightmare on Grace Street"
2012	The Glades	Vanessa Russo	Episode: "Food Fight"
2014	Legit	Katie Knox	4 episodes
2015	Casual	Amy	Episode: "Pilot"
