= Say I Do (2003 film) =

- Directed by: Ron Vignone
- Written by: Ron Vignone; Joe Forte
- Produced by: Ron Vignone; Joe Forte; Tricia Linklater
- Starring: Ben Koldyke; Pamela Moore Somers; Rebecca Rosenak; Samuel Bliss Cooper; David Bel Ayche
- Cinematography: Christopher C. Pearson
- Edited by: Ron Vignone
- Music by: Steve Bissinger; Jamie Blanks
- Distributed by: Breaking Glass Pictures
- Release date: 2003 (Dances With Films)
- Running time: 90 minutes
- Country: United States
- Language: English

Say I Do is a 2003 American romantic comedy-drama film directed by Ron Vignone, starring Ben Koldyke, Pamela Moore Somers, Rebecca Rosenak, Samuel Bliss Cooper and David Bel Ayche.

== Cast ==
- Ben Koldyke as Ben
- Pamela Moore Somers as Sydney
- Rebecca Rosenak as Patricia
- Samuel Bliss Cooper as Michael
- David Bel Ayche as David
- Don O. Knowlton as The Best Man

== Reception ==
Eric Campos of Film Threat wrote a positive review of the film.

Manny Lewis of the Seattle Post-Intelligencer wrote that the film "succeeds" as a "lens through which an impending marriage can be seen gradually shedding its formalities and pageantry until the only things remaining are the real people involved." Lewis also praised the performances, writing that the actors "embody their roles so convincingly that what's onscreen always feels authentic."

Ted Fry of The Seattle Times wrote: "Largely relying on improvisation, the movie is nicely characterized and moves along at a good clip, but without quite enough laughs or tearful moments to keep up with the concept."
