= Frontenac Company =

Chicago-based private equity firm

Frontenac
- Company type: LLP
- Industry: Private equity
- Founded: 1971; 55 years ago
- Founder: Martin J. Koldyke
- Headquarters: Chicago, Illinois, United States
- Key people: Walter Florence; Ron Kuehl; Michael Langdon; Joe Rondinelli; Elizabeth Williamson
- Products: Financial services
- Number of employees: 32
- Website: Frontenac

Frontenac is a Chicago-based private equity firm founded in 1971. The firm focuses on investing in lower middle market buyout transactions in the consumer, industrial, and services industries. Frontenac works in partnership with established operating leaders, through an executive-centric approach called CEO1ST, which seeks to identify, acquire, and build market-leading companies through transformational acquisitions and operational excellence. Over the last 50 years, Frontenac has built a leading franchise working with over 350 owners of mid-sized businesses as they address complex transition issues of liquidity, management enhancement, and growth planning.

Frontenac uses a trademarked methodology it calls "CEO1ST", which looks to combine seasoned operating executives with high-potential companies. The firm funds and supports its CEO1st partners in acquiring and growing businesses through a well-established process that includes defining a thesis, sourcing investment opportunities, evaluating alternatives and executing a deal. A CEO1ST executive may serve as CEO, Chairman or lead director post close, depending on his/her own objectives and the specific needs of the company.

As of 2025, Frontenac’s senior team includes Walter Florence, Ron Kuehl, Michael Langdon, Joe Rondinelli, and Elizabeth Williamson.
