= It's Always Sunny in Philadelphia season 7 =

2011 season of American television series

It's Always Sunny in Philadelphia
- Season 7
- DVD cover
- Starring: Charlie Day; Glenn Howerton; Rob McElhenney; Kaitlin Olson; Danny DeVito
- No. of episodes: 13

Release
- Original network: FX
- Original release: September 15 – December 15, 2011

Season chronology
- ← Previous; Season 6 Next → Season 8

The seventh season of the American television sitcom series It's Always Sunny in Philadelphia, premiered on FX on September 15, 2011. The season contains 13 episodes, and concluded airing on December 15, 2011.

== Cast ==
=== Main cast ===
- Charlie Day as Charlie Kelly
- Glenn Howerton as Dennis Reynolds
- Rob McElhenney as Mac
- Kaitlin Olson as Deandra "Dee" Reynolds
- Danny DeVito as Frank Reynolds

=== Special guest cast ===
- Jason Sudeikis as Schmitty

=== Recurring cast ===
- Mary Elizabeth Ellis as The Waitress
- David Hornsby as Cricket

=== Guest stars ===
- Alanna Ubach as Roxy
- John Walcutt as Doctor
- Geoffrey Owens as Fake Tiger Woods
- Kristina Apgar as Stephanie
- Christopher Backus as Bobby
- Artemis Pebdani as Artemis
- Caitlin Carmichael as Samantha
- Erik Jensen as Walter Harris
- Maxim Knight as Benjamin
- Emily Evan Rae as Justine
- Kim Hawthorne as Susan
- Jon Polito as Gino Reynolds
- Naturi Naughton as Shadynasty
- Lance Reddick as Reggie
- Matt Corboy as Airport Security
- Jessica Collins as Jackie Denardo
- David Marciano as Detective Larson
- Rosalie Ward as Sally
- Luenell as Catfish
- Susan Park as Woman
- Robert Wu as Man
- Arnold Chun as Barry
- W. Morgan Sheppard as Father Cullen
- Sasha Roiz as Adriano Calvanese
- Catherine Reitman as Maureen Ponderosa
- Cormac Bluestone as Jimmy Doyle
- Nick Wechsler as Brad
- Ian Reed Kesler as Tim Murphy
- Frances Turner as Christie
- Caleb Followill as Man at Bar
- Nathan Followill as Bartender #1
- Jared Followill as Bartender #2
- Judy Greer as Ingrid "Fatty Magoo" Nelson

== Episodes ==
No. overall	No. in season	Title	Directed by	Written by	Original release date	Prod. code	US viewers (millions)
72	1	"Frank's Pretty Woman"	Matt Shakman	Scott Marder & Rob Rosell	September 15, 2011	XIP07002	2.28
Frank decides to marry his favorite crack-smoking hooker Roxy (Alanna Ubach), so Dee tries to pull a "Pretty Woman" and clean her up. Dennis worries about Mac's health because he has inexplicably gained 50 pounds ("cultivating mass" in his words); the two head to the doctor's office where they both get surprising diagnoses. Charlie pretends to be a millionaire in a scheme to get Frank a date with a woman who is not a prostitute.
73	2	"The Gang Goes to the Jersey Shore"	Matt Shakman	Dave Chernin & John Chernin	September 22, 2011	XIP07012	1.93
Dennis and Dee want to relive their carefree childhood vacation memories, so the Gang takes a trip to the Jersey Shore. Their various meanderings find Charlie connecting with the Waitress, Dennis and Dee discovering a less-innocent side of the Jersey Shore, and Frank and Mac getting lost at sea, then partying with the local "guidos" who rescue them.
74	3	"Frank Reynolds’ Little Beauties"	Matt Shakman	Scott Marder & Rob Rosell	September 29, 2011	XIP07011	2.03
Frank inadvertently becomes involved in the child beauty pageant business and is subsequently terrified of being perceived as a pedophile; as Dee plots revenge on the pageant's bratty frontrunner, Mac, Dennis, and Charlie think they've found their dark horse to win 'Frank's Little Beauties.'
75	4	"Sweet Dee Gets Audited"	Matt Shakman	Rob McElhenney & Glenn Howerton & Charlie Day	October 6, 2011	XIP07010	1.82
Dee is forced to commit some deeply questionable acts to escape an unexpected IRS audit; meanwhile, Mac, Dennis, and Charlie demand a great democracy in bar operations to stop Frank from doing what he pleases with Paddy's profits.
76	5	"Frank's Brother"	Matt Shakman	David Hornsby	October 13, 2011	XIP07004	1.42
The Gang is shocked to meet Frank's long-lost brother (Jon Polito) when he unexpectedly arrives at Paddy's and reveals Frank's background as proprietor of a nightclub known as "Shadynasty's".
77	6	"The Storm of the Century"	Matt Shakman	Charles W. Hornsby	October 20, 2011	XIP07008	1.52
The Gang joins the masses in a race to secure scarce resources as a major storm approaches Philadelphia; Frank refuses to buy into the media hype about the storm; Dennis becomes infatuated with reporter Jackie Denardo (Jessica Collins).
78	7	"Chardee MacDennis: The Game of Games"	Matt Shakman	Charlie Day & Rob McElhenney	October 27, 2011	XIP07001	1.38
Dee and Dennis face off against Mac, Charlie and Frank in the super-twisted board game they developed years ago. The game has three levels: mind, body, and spirit. Mind is composed of trivia, puzzles, and artistry; body is composed of physical challenge, pain, and endurance; and spirit is composed of emotional battery and public humiliation.
79	8	"The ANTI-Social Network"	Matt Shakman	Charlie Day & Glenn Howerton	November 3, 2011	XIP07003	1.69
Mac and Dee use the Internet to cyber-stalk a man who shushed them at a trendy bar. Dennis and Charlie stalk him the old fashioned way. Frank tries to drum up business for Paddy's with a viral video.
80	9	"The Gang Gets Trapped"	Matt Shakman	Luvh Rakhe	November 10, 2011	XIP07009	1.32
The gang's plan to extract an artifact is jeopardized when the owners return unexpectedly.
81	10	"How Mac Got Fat"	Randall Einhorn; Matt Shakman	Scott Marder and Mehar Sethi	November 17, 2011	XIP06004	1.26
Mac tells a priest why his recent weight gain is The Gang's fault and not his; the Gang's bar achieves a success level it has never seen, and only lowly Charlie takes it seriously. This episode includes scenes produced for the sixth season.
82	11	"Thunder Gun Express"	Matt Shakman	Dave Chernin & John Chernin	December 1, 2011	XIP07007	1.52
The Gang heads to see a popular action movie, but when President Obama's visit to Philly causes a major traffic jam, they split up and resort to backstabbing, theft, manipulation, and unsavory shortcuts to reach the theater in time.
83	12	"The High School Reunion"	Matt Shakman	Glenn Howerton & Rob McElhenney	December 8, 2011	XIP07005	1.40
Part 1 of 2. At the Gang's high-school reunion, Dennis learns he wasn't as popular as he thought he was; Dee is finally accepted into the popular clique; Mac, Charlie, and Frank are treated the same as they were in high school; and Mac's full name is revealed.
84	13	"The High School Reunion Part 2: The Gang's Revenge"	Matt Shakman	Glenn Howerton & Rob McElhenney	December 15, 2011	XIP07006	1.32
Part 2 of 2. The disastrous events from the first part of the reunion lead to psychosis, Dee's painful initiation into Mac, Charlie, and Frank's re-creation of their high-school psycho troupe "The Freight Train"; and a plan to win back the favor of the Gang's former classmates via the magic of dance and George Michael. Both episodes feature The Gang's high-school friends that the audience has met throughout the series.

== Reception ==
The seventh season received positive reviews. On Rotten Tomatoes, it has an approval rating of 100% with an average score of 8.5 out of 10 based on 13 reviews. The website's critical consensus reads, "Rob McElhenney's Mac gets slovenly, but It's Always Sunny shows no signs of resting on its laurels with a seventh season that charts a hilariously disastrous course from the Jersey Shore to the Gang's high school reunion."

== Home media ==
It's Always Sunny in Philadelphia: The Complete Season 7
Set details	Special features
13 episodes; 2-disc set; Technical specifications: Anamorphic widescreen (1.78:1); English Dolby Digital 5.1 (DVD), DTS-HD Master Audio 5.1 (Blu-ray); English SDH, French, Spanish subtitles	Four audio commentaries by Glenn Howerton, Charlie Day and Rob McElhenney; "Artemis Tours Philadelphia" featurette; Blooper reel
Release dates
Region 1
October 9, 2012
