= It's Always Sunny in Philadelphia season 10 =

2015 season of American television series

It's Always Sunny in Philadelphia
- Season 10
- DVD cover
- Starring: Charlie Day; Glenn Howerton; Rob McElhenney; Kaitlin Olson; Danny DeVito
- No. of episodes: 10

Release
- Original network: FXX
- Original release: January 14 – March 18, 2015

Season chronology
- ← Previous; Season 9 Next → Season 11

The tenth season of the American television sitcom series It's Always Sunny in Philadelphia premiered on FXX on January 14, 2015. The season consists of 10 episodes and concluded on March 18, 2015. The tenth season was released on DVD in region 1 on January 5, 2016.

== Cast ==
=== Main cast ===
- Charlie Day as Charlie Kelly
- Glenn Howerton as Dennis Reynolds
- Rob McElhenney as Mac
- Kaitlin Olson as Deandra "Dee" Reynolds
- Danny DeVito as Frank Reynolds

=== Recurring cast ===
- David Hornsby as Cricket
- Lynne Marie Stewart as Bonnie
- Sandy Martin as Mrs. Mac

=== Guest stars ===
- Wade Boggs as himself
- Jennifer Elise Cox as Lizzie
- Emily Wilson as Flight Attendant
- Michael Naughton as Waiter
- Mary Elizabeth Ellis as The Waitress
- Jareb Dauplaise as Tom
- Nick Gehlfuss as Sean
- Andy Ridings as Ryan
- Dominic Burgess as Psycho Pete
- Aubrey Morris as Albert Zimmerman
- Francesca P. Roberts as Sandy Lawler
- David Pressman as Delivery Guy
- Jim Lau as Asian Manager
- Elizabeth Sung as Female Worker
- Andrew Leeds as Jason
- Allison Munn as Kelly
- D'Anthony Palms as David
- Brady Smith as Tony
- Maria Zyrianova as Dusty
- Lance Barber as Bill Ponderosa
- Gregory Scott Cummins as Luther Mac
- Catherine Reitman as Maureen Ponderosa
- Cheryl Texiera as Jane Ponderosa
- Jason Manuel Olazabal as Worker
- Keegan-Michael Key as Grant Anderson
- Anna Maria Horsford as Janet Barrett
- Alden Ray as Franuito
- J.D. Walsh as Doctor
- Dax Shepard as JoJo
- T.J. Hoban as Rex/The Master
- Brittney Alger as Cindy
- Cazzey Louis Cereghino as Tiny

== Production ==
The series was renewed for a tenth season (along with its ninth season) on March 28, 2013, and was announced the series would move from FX to its sister channel FXX. The season was originally scheduled to premiere in fall 2014, but was delayed until January 2015. Glenn Howerton said in July 2013 that the series was planned to end after ten seasons, but it was renewed for an 11th and 12th season in April 2014. JD Harmeyer guest-directed a scene in the episode "The Gang Group Dates".

== Episodes ==
No. overall	No. in season	Title	Directed by	Written by	Original release date	Prod. code	US viewers (millions)
105	1	"The Gang Beats Boggs"	Todd Biermann	Dave Chernin & John Chernin	January 14, 2015	XIP10001	0.786
Dennis, Dee, Charlie, and Frank attempt to honor Wade Boggs by breaking his record of drinking "50 to 70" cans of beer when they take a cross-country flight to Los Angeles, with Mac tallying number of beers drank because he lost the "chugging contest" to decide who qualifies for the game. Dennis and Frank try to beat each other to the mile-high club, Charlie and Dee hallucinate from excessive alcohol consumption, Mac smuggles an entire suitcase of beer onboard, and Frank gives a frat boy a possibly-lethal dose of sleeping pills.
106	2	"The Gang Group Dates"	Richie Keen	Rob Rosell	January 21, 2015	XIP10008	0.524
The Gang hosts group dating in the bar: Dennis is obsessed with a website that allows women to rate their dates with men, even trying to use The Waitress as an ally in his quest for better reviews; Frank tries to coach Mac and Charlie on how to suppress their gross, crazy, or Anti-Semitic thoughts to be more effective daters; Dee sleeps with many men to give them bad ratings.
107	3	"Psycho Pete Returns"	Todd Biermann	Charlie Day & Glenn Howerton & Rob McElhenney	January 28, 2015	XIP10002	0.511
"Psycho Pete" from high school, who was accused of killing and eating his family, returns from the mental institution and Mac and Charlie try to make him "fun psycho" again as he now appears to be calm and soft-spoken; Dennis, Dee, and Frank try to get rid of him with help from Rickety Cricket.
108	4	"Charlie Work"	Matt Shakman	Charlie Day & Glenn Howerton & Rob McElhenney	February 4, 2015	XIP10004	0.554
Charlie is eager to ready Paddy's for the annual health inspection, but the Gang's scam involving airline miles, steaks, and chickens, plus a series of other obstacles, give him a dizzy day of problem-solving.
109	5	"The Gang Spies Like U.S."	Matt Shakman	David Hornsby	February 11, 2015	XIP10003	0.527
The Gang takes measures to assuage their paranoia when a cannery owned by China opens in the neighborhood; Dennis and Mac become focused on a fetish.
110	6	"The Gang Misses the Boat"	Richie Keen	Charlie Day & Glenn Howerton & Rob McElhenney	February 18, 2015	XIP10007	0.544
The Gang members go in separate directions in their frustration from missing out on a boat ride: Dennis starts trying to control his anger and attempt to sell his Range Rover; Dee and Charlie get closer as friends and team up for "def poetry"; Frank tries to join a "new gang" who just opened a new bar; and Mac decides to date hotter women.
111	7	"Mac Kills His Dad"	Heath Cullens	Dave Chernin & John Chernin and David Hornsby	February 25, 2015	XIP10010	0.442
Mac's nasty dad Luther is in jail on a murder charge and Mac and Charlie seek to prove his innocence with disastrous consequences; Bill Ponderosa comes to Paddy's and announces his plan to drink himself to death, so Frank, Dennis, and Dee seek to either stop him or profit from him doing it.
112	8	"The Gang Goes on Family Fight"	Matt Shakman	Charlie Day & Glenn Howerton & Rob McElhenney	March 4, 2015	XIP10005	0.445
The Gang appears as contestants on Family Fight, a fictional game show: Frank wants to spout right-wing political positions; Mac keeps mixing up which game show he's on; Dee aims for lowbrow humor; Dennis demands classiness but gets unnerved by the "wrong-answer" buzzer; Charlie's odd knack for getting fringe answers correct has a rational explanation; and the host (Keegan-Michael Key) comes to absolutely hate them all.
113	9	"Frank Retires"	Richie Keen	Charlie Day & Glenn Howerton & Rob McElhenney	March 11, 2015	XIP10006	0.505
Frank decides to retire from Paddy's, leading the rest of the gang into a fight to determine the next legal owner.
114	10	"Ass Kickers United: Mac and Charlie Join a Cult"	Heath Cullens	Scott Marder	March 18, 2015	XIP10009	0.543
Mac and Charlie join a fitness club that may or may not be a cult, and when Dee and Frank find out that Dennis came up with it so he can lower Mac's self-esteem and get him to stop eating his Thin Mint cookies, Dee and Frank blackmail Dennis to let them in on the plan so Frank can recruit women into the club and Dee can finally get someone to renovate Dennis and Mac’s burned apartment so they move back out.

== Reception ==
The tenth season received positive reviews. On Rotten Tomatoes, it has an approval rating of 100% with an average score of 7.9 out of 10 based on 14 reviews. The website's critical consensus reads, "Always Sunny shows no signs of dimming after a decade on the air, refusing to let its status as a television mainstay give it any sheen of respectability as the Gang continues to torment each other for viewers' enjoyment."

== Home media ==
It's Always Sunny in Philadelphia: The Complete Season 10
Set details	Special features
10 episodes; 2-disc set (Region 1); Technical specifications: Anamorphic widescreen (1.78:1); English Dolby Digital 5.1; English SDH, French, Spanish subtitles	Gag reel
Release date
Region 1
January 5, 2016
