= Chad L. Coleman =

American actor (born 1967)

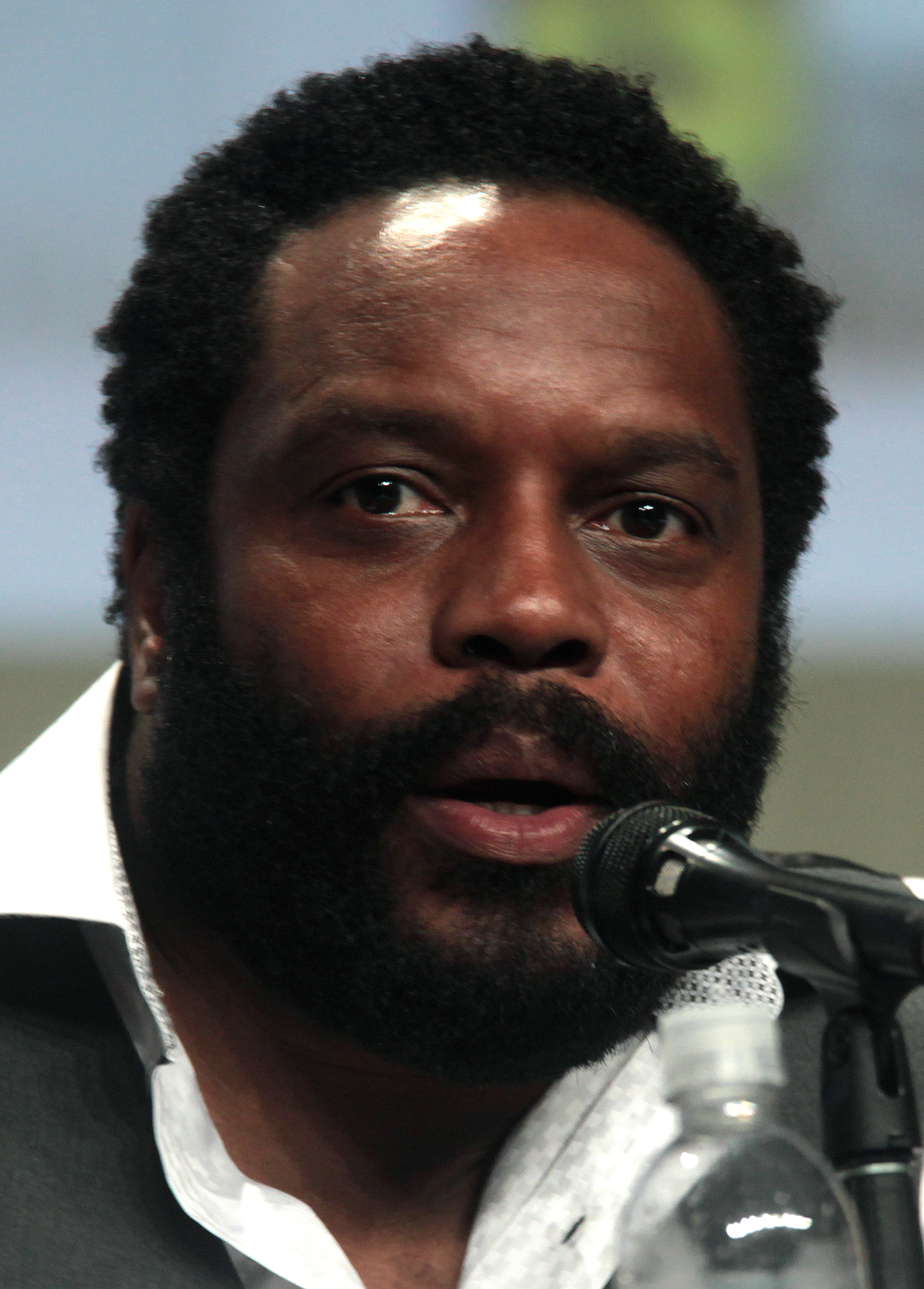
- Coleman at the 2014 San Diego Comic Con
- Born: September 6, 1967 (age 59); Richmond, Virginia, U.S.
- Occupation: Actor
- Years active: 1992–present
- Known for: The Wire; The Walking Dead; Superman & Lois; Left 4 Dead 2
- Spouse: Sally Stewart (m. 1999; div. 2010)
- Children: 2

Chad L. Coleman (born September 6, 1967) is an American actor. He is known for playing Dennis "Cutty" Wise on the HBO series The Wire (2004–08), Coach in the video game Left 4 Dead 2 (2009), Tyreese on the AMC series The Walking Dead (2012–15), Mingo on Roots (2016), Z on the FX sitcom It's Always Sunny in Philadelphia (2010–19), Fred Johnson on The Expanse (2015–20), Klyden on The Orville (2017–22), and Bruno Mannheim in the superhero drama television series Superman & Lois (2023–24).

== Early life ==
Coleman was born in Richmond, Virginia. After he was removed from neglectful parents in the Creighton Court public housing project, he was raised by a grandmother on Richmond's south side after some time in a foster home. As a youth, he participated in track and field, but turned his attention to drama after a leg injury. He attended Virginia Commonwealth University on a scholarship for his freshman year, before dropping out to serve in the U.S. Army. During his service, from 1985 to 1989, he worked as a video cameraman.

== Career ==
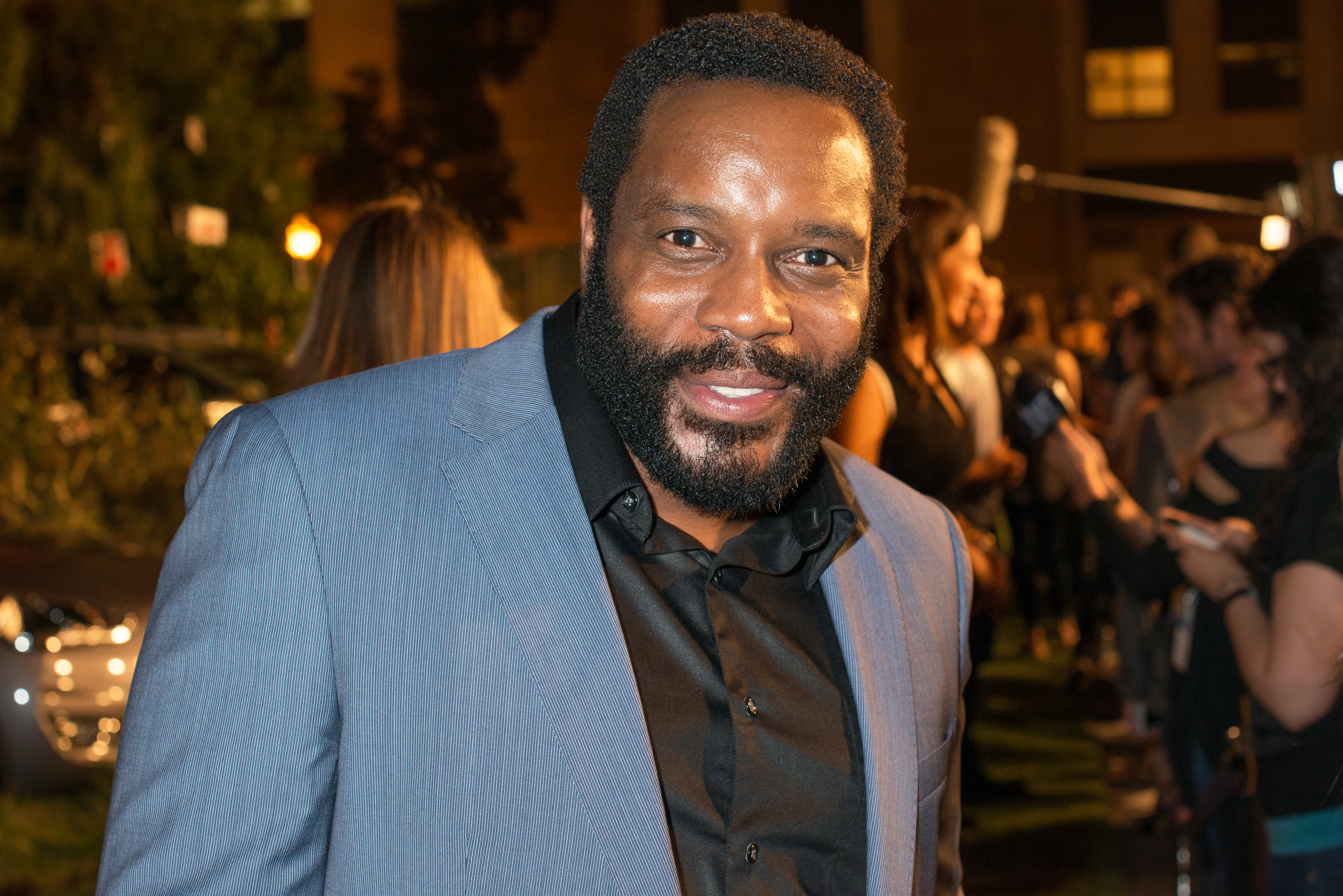
Coleman in 2013

Coleman had a starring role on the HBO series The Wire as reformed criminal Dennis "Cutty" Wise. In 2002, Coleman starred as O. J. Simpson in TNT's television movie Monday Night Mayhem.

Coleman also had a guest role in the Terminator: Sarah Connor Chronicles TV series on Fox. He also had a small role in Carlito's Way: Rise to Power. Coleman was also involved with the development of Left 4 Dead 2, as a voice actor for the character Coach. In 2009, Coleman appeared in a revival of August Wilson's play Joe Turner's Come and Gone on Broadway and also had a starring role in the Norwegian TV series Buzz Aldrin, What Happened To You In All The Confusion?, based on the novel by Johan Harstad. The series aired in Europe in November 2011.

He guest starred in the In Plain Sight episode "Whistle Stop" as an ex-boxer/witness suffering from pugilistic dementia, and in the Lie to Me episode "The Canary's Song" as a coal miner. He has also guest starred in five episodes of It's Always Sunny in Philadelphia between 2010 and 2019 as the character "Z". In 2011, he began playing Gary Miller, the ex-husband of Nikki Miller and father of manipulative daughter Mackenzie, in the Fox television sitcom I Hate My Teenage Daughter.

From late 2012 to early 2015, Coleman played Tyreese on AMC's post-apocalyptic horror series The Walking Dead. In the third season, Tyreese was a recurring character. Coleman was upgraded to series regular and main cast member at the start of the fourth season and retained this status for its fifth season until his character was killed off in the mid-season premiere. On November 20, 2014, he was announced to play Fred Johnson, a.k.a. "The Butcher of Anderson Station", a former Marine caught in a power struggle between Earth and Mars on the science-fiction series The Expanse.

Coleman also played Mingo in the 2016 re-imagining of Roots, on the History Channel. Mingo is a stern, no-nonsense slave/cock trainer for Tom Lea, who keeps the Lea plantation afloat. He befriends Chicken George and they bond like father and son.

Additionally, Coleman is executive producer, as well as visual inspiration for the character Mr. Osi of the futuristic graphic novel series Treadwater.

In 2016, he played the role of Tobias Church on Arrow. He played the recurring role of Klyden, Second Officer Bortus's mate, on The Orville (2017–22). In 2019, Coleman recurred in the first two seasons of All American as Corey James. He then played Bruno Mannheim in the superhero drama television series Superman & Lois (2023–24).

== Personal life ==
Coleman was married to Sally Stewart from 1999 to 2010.

On May 1, 2015, Coleman was recorded in the middle of a rant on New York City's 4 subway train. He stated that the rant was prompted by "built-up frustration" stemming from the death of Freddie Gray.

Later that year, he created a PSA with the non-profit organization Living Advantage where fostering children is promoted as a fulfilling complement to adoption.

== Filmography ==
=== Film ===
Year	Title	Role	Notes
1993	New York Undercover Cop	"Iceman"	
1999	Saturn	Orderly	
2001	The Gilded Six Bits	Joe Banks	Short
2001	Revolution #9	Night Nurse	
2002	The End of The Bar	Dr. Scott Rosen	
2004	Brother to Brother	"El"	
2005	Carlito's Way: Rise to Power	Clyde Bassie	Video
2006	Confessions	Darius	
2011	The Green Hornet	"Chili"	
2011	Good Man	Good Man	Short
2011	Horrible Bosses	The Bartender	
2012	Life, Love, Soul	Earl Grant	
2012	Shattered Pitch	Sammy	Short
2013	Cinemanovels	Parking Cop	
2013	Habeas Corpus	Ray Jr.	Short
2014	Crazy Little Thing Called... 'Ships	Mr. Anders	Short
2017	The Black Ghiandola	Tanner Alonso	Short
2018	Making Lemonade	Chad	Short
2020	Broken Bird	Andre	Short
2021	Copshop	Duane Mitchell	
2022	A Christmas Prayer	Andre Dillard	
2023	The Angry Black Girl and Her Monster	Donald	
2023	Shooting Stars	Coach Harold Sams	
2025	Christy	Don King	

=== Television ===
Year	Title	Role	Notes
1992	Here and Now	Roland	Episode: "A.J.'s Big Leap"
1994	Law & Order	Henry	Episode: "Golden Years"
1994	New York Undercover	Kevin Gray	Episode: "To Protect and Serve"
1995	Law & Order	Weiner	Episode: "Paranoia"
1996	New York Undercover	Shoop	Episode: "Andre's Choice"
1998	Soul Man	Buster	Episode: "Raising Heck"
1999–2001	Third Watch	Grissom / Lamar	2 episodes
2002	Monday Night Mayhem	O. J. Simpson	Television film
2003	Guiding Light	Moses	Episode: "April 18, 2003"
2003	Hack	Lafonso	2 episodes
2003	Law & Order: Special Victims Unit	Prison Warden	Episode: "Rotten"
2004–2008	The Wire	Dennis "Cutty" Wise	20 episodes
2005	Numbers	Williams	Episode: "Man Hunt"
2008	New Amsterdam	Lieutenant Bobby Graham	Episode: "Golden Boy"
2008	Life on Mars	"Suede"	Episode: "Things to Do in New York When You Think You're Dead"
2009	CSI: Miami	Kevin Landau	Episode: "Smoke Gets in Your CSI's"
2009	Terminator: The Sarah Connor Chronicles	Queeg	Episode: "Today Is the Day: Part 1 & 2"
2009	The Forgotten	Ray Perkins	Episode: "Football John"
2009	Boldly Going Nowhere	"Cobalt"	Television film
2010	In Plain Sight	Ricky Dupree / Ricky Dumont	Episode: "Whistle Stop"
2010	Lie to Me	Darryl	Episode: "The Canary's Song"
2010	The Good Wife	Carter Wright	Episode: "Nine Hours"
2010–2019	It's Always Sunny in Philadelphia	"Z"	Recurring cast (season 6), guest (season 9 & 12 & 14)
2011	Buzz Aldrin	Carl	Recurring cast
2011–2012	I Hate My Teenage Daughter	Gary Miller	Main cast
2012	Criminal Minds	Malcolm Ford	Episode: "The Company"
2012	Electric City	Manny	Voice, main role
2012	Burn Notice	Brady Pressman	Episode: "Desperate Times"
2012–2015	The Walking Dead	Tyreese	21 episodes
2013	Cult	True Believer #4	Episode: "Off to See the Wizard"
2013–2016	Family Guy	Various Voices	2 episodes
2014	Law & Order: Special Victims Unit	A.J. Martin	Episode: "Spousal Privilege"
2015–2020	The Expanse	Fred Lucius Johnson	Recurring cast (season 1-5)
2016	Roots	Mingo	Episode: "Part 3"
2016	Freakish	Coach	Recurring cast (season 1)
2016	Arrow	Tobias Church	4 episodes
2017	The Goldbergs	Leon Schmion	Episode: "The Spencer's Gift"
2017	Michael Jackson: Searching for Neverland	Bill Whitfield	Television film
2017–2022	The Orville	Klyden	Recurring cast
2018	Drop the Mic	Himself	Episode: "Darren Criss vs. Gaten Matarazzo & Chandler Riggs vs. Chad L. Coleman"
2019	All American	Corey James	Recurring cast (season 1-2)
2020	Interrogation	Mr. Franklin	Recurring cast
2020	Soul City	James	Episode: "Give Man"
2021	Invincible	Martian Man	Voice, episode: "It's About Time"
2022–2024	Girls5eva	Sheawn	4 episodes
2023–2024	Superman & Lois	Bruno Mannheim	Main role (season 3), guest role (season 4); 15 episodes
2024	Three Women	FBI Special Agent Mike Ness	3 episodes
2025	Chicago P.D.	Odell Morgan	Episode: "Send Me"

=== Video games ===
Year	Title	Role
2005	The Warriors	Jackson / Austin
2005	50 Cent: Bulletproof	Booker
2006	Bully	Officer Williams
2008	Grand Theft Auto IV	K109: The Studio - Imaging Voice, Commercial
2009	Grand Theft Auto: The Ballad of Gay Tony	K109: The Studio - Imaging Voice
2009	Left 4 Dead 2	Coach
2023	The Expanse: A Telltale Series	Fred Lucius Johnson
