= Francesca P. Roberts =

American film and television actress

- Born: December 19, 1953 (age 72); Los Angeles, California, U.S.
- Education: University of New Orleans; Southern Illinois University; L'École de Mime Jacques LeCoq
- Occupations: Film and television actress
- Years active: 1979–present

Francesca P. Roberts (born December 19, 1953) is an American film and television actress known for playing Big Bertha in the live action movie Super Mario Bros. in 1993, as well as Anita Craig in ABC's sitcom TV series Baby Talk, which lasted from 1991 to 1992, and Anna-May in Frank's Place.

== Early life and education ==
Roberts was born on December 19, 1953 in Los Angeles, California but raised in New Orleans, Louisiana. The daughter of Margaret B. Roberts (née Gross, 1926–2016) and Bobby Ray Louis Roberts Sr., she had two younger sisters Melanie and Bianca, as well as two younger brothers who are now both deceased, Bobby Jr. and Gregory. She attended three colleges: University of New Orleans, Southern Illinois University and L'École de Mime Jacques LeCoq, where she has also studied in New Orleans, Louisiana and Paris, France.

== Career ==
Roberts was originally involved in stage work before appearing on TV.

Roberts made her first television appearance in Starsky & Hutch in 1979, only appearing in a minor role. Then she later moved on to make her debut film appearance in Inside Moves (1980), starring John Savage. She would continue on by making numerous TV guest appearances that had main or minor roles, in the likes of Private Benjamin, a show that was based on the film with the same name (1980), Fame, The Facts of Life, Frank's Place and Baby Talk. She would appear in movies, such as Heart of Dixie (1989) as "Keefi", the live-action movie based on the Mario video game series, Super Mario Bros. (1993), playing as "Big Bertha", a bouncer of the Boom Boom Bar, and Legally Blonde (2001) as judge "Marina R. Bickford". Other films appearances include Hard to Kill (1990), The Odd Couple II (1998), and In Good Company (2004).

Roberts has frequently appeared in film or TV, playing characters for only just a minimum time. In 1994, she appeared on Martin, playing as "Judge Wheatley" in two episodes, "No Justice, No Peace" & "Crunchy Drawers" (season 2). She has also appeared in episodes of Step by Step, Home Improvement, Ally McBeal, Judging Amy, and Boston Legal among others.

Roberts often plays characters who are courtroom judges in movies or TV.

== Filmography ==
Film and television
Year	Title	Role	Notes
1979	Starsky & Hutch	Cora-Lee	Episode: "Huggy Can't Go Home"
1980	Inside Moves	Hooker	Film
1981	Private Benjamin	Private Harriet Dorsey	Episode: "Judy Got Her Gun" "Judy in the Driver's Seat"
1982	Money on the Side	Clerk	TV movie
1983	Dallas	Librarian	Episode: "To Catch a Sly"
1985	Fame	The Nurse	Episode: "Coco Returns"
1985	Generation	Spanish Woman	TV movie
1985	The Facts of Life	Vera	Episode: "Christmas Baby"
1987–1988	Frank's Place	Anna-May	Main role (22 episodes)
1989	Have Faith	Sally Coleman	7 episodes
1989	Heart of Dixie	Keefi	Film
1990	Hard to Kill	Martha Coe	Film
1990	Murder, She Wrote	Ruth	Episode: "O'Malley's Luck"
1990	The Family Man	Miss Campbell	Episode: "Making Babies"
1990	ABC Afterschool Special	Sally	Episode: "Testing Dirty"
1991	Gabriel's Fire	Miss Richards	Episode: "The Great Waldo"
1991	What a Dummy	Sheila	Episode: "Bringing Up Baby"
1991	Prison Stories: Women on the Inside	Lucy	TV movie
1991	Davis Rules	Mrs. Barrett	Episode: " A Man for All Reasons"
1991	The Munsters Today	Okra Dimpley	Episode: "Diary of a Mad Munsterwife"
1992	Gladiator	Miss Higgins	Film
1991–1992	Baby Talk	Anita Craig	Main role (23 episodes)
1993	Super Mario Bros.	Big Bertha	Film
1993	Mad About You	Nurse	Episode: "Bedfellows"
1994	The Nanny	Nurse Smith	Episode: "Deep Throat"
1994	Martin	Judge Wheatley	Episode: "Crunchy Drawers" "No Justice, No Peace"
1992	S.F.W.	Kim Martin	Film
1994	My So-Called Life	Ms. Mandeville	Episode: "Father Figures"
1994	Melrose Place	Marcia	Episode: "Sex, Drugs and Rockin' the Cradle"
1995	Safe	Patient No. 2	Film
1995	Step by Step	Dr. Postley	Episode: "A Foster/Lambert Production" "Can't Buy Me Love"
1996	Eye for an Eye	Parent of Murdered Children Group #2	Film
1996	High Incident	?	Episode: Till Death Do Us Part
1996	Moesha	Maxine	Episode: "Reunion"
1997	Hangin' with Mr. Cooper	Nicole	Episode: "Security"
1997	Women: Stories of Passion	Clara	Episode: "Chinese Take-Out"
1997	Fired Up	Mrs. Francis	13 episodes
1998	The Odd Couple II	Passenger	Film
1998–1999	Maggie	Kimberly	8 episodes
1994–1999	Home Improvement	Marge	Episode: "Knee Deep" "Future Shock" "It's My Party" "Slip Sleddin' Away"
1999	It's Like, You Know...	Mrs. Robinson	Episode: "Arthur 2: On the Rocks"
2000	City of Angels	Iris Forchette	Episode: "The Prince and the Porker"
2000	Family Law	Janet Moriarty	Episode: "One Mistake"
2000	Gideon's Crossing	Rae Trayfield	Episode: "The Gift"
2000	Felicity	Clinic Worker	Episode: "Surprise"
1999–2000	Ally McBeal	Judge Cynthia Harris	Episode: "Love on Holiday" "Love Unlimited"
2001	7th Heaven	Mrs. Miller	Episode: "Regrets"
2001	Go Fish	Principal Fields	Episode: "Go Four-Point Plan"
2001	Legally Blonde	Marina R. Bickford	Film
2001	The District	Mrs. Nunez	Episode: "Melt Down"
2002	That '80s Show	Professor Webster	Episode: "Double Date"
2003	Presidio Med	?	Episode: "Suffer Unto Me the Children..."
2003	The Division	Judge	Episode: "Body Double"
2003–2004	10-8: Officers on Duty	Darla Handy	Episode: "Wild and the Innocent" "Blood Sugar Sex Magik" "Badlands" "A Hard Day's Night" "Brothers in Arms"
2004	Quintuplets	Principal Wilcox	Episode: "Teacher's Pet"
2004	In Good Company	Loan Officer	Film
2002–2005	Judging Amy	ASA Teresa Willings	Episode: "Getting Out" "Maxine Interrupted" "The Cook of the Money Pot"
2006	Grey's Anatomy	Estelle Byrd	Episode: "Let the Angels Commit"
2007	Man in the Chair	Juanita	Film
2007	Love Is a Four Letter Word	Judge Doolittle	TV movie
2007	Take	Principal	Film
2007	Big Shots	Dr. Seaver-Filner	Episode: "Greatest Amerimart Hero" "The Good, the Bad, and the Really Ugly" "Tall, Dark and Hairless" "Pilot"
2005–2008	Boston Legal	Judge Jamie Atkinson	Episode: "Guardians and Gatekeepers" "Word Salad Days" "Truly, Madly, Deeply" "Schadenfreude" "'Til We Meat Again"
2009	Pushing Daisies	Amelia Stingwell	Episode: "Water & Power"
2009	The Forgotten	Flora Williams	Episode: "River John"
2010	Outlaw	Judge Jenny Hagopian	Episode: "In Re: Curtis Farwell"
2010–2011	Law & Order: LA	Judge Martha Dreyer	Episode: "Echo Park" "Angel's Knoll" "Silver Lake" "Hondo Field"
2012	Wilfred	Felicia	Episode: "Service" "Dignity" "Progress"
2015	Bad Judge	?	Episode: "The Fixer"
2015	It's Always Sunny in Philadelphia	Sandy Lawler	Episode: "Charlie Work"
2016	Shameless	Ms. Taylor	Episode: "Pimp's Paradise"
2017	Empire	Judge Barnes	Episode: "Fortune Be Not Crost"
