= Ryan Gaul =

American actor

- Occupations: Actor; comedian; writer
- Years active: 2002–present
- Spouse: Christine Gaul
- Children: 2

Ryan Gaul is an American actor, comedian and writer. He has appeared on shows such as Showtime's House of Lies, Super Fun Night, Hart of Dixie, Hot in Cleveland, 2 Broke Girls, It's Always Sunny in Philadelphia, Superstore, Bajillion Dollar Propertie$, and The Last O.G.

== Life and career ==
Gaul attended the Lincoln Academy of Newcastle, Maine, and then the Stonehill College, and worked at W.B. Mason before becoming an actor and a Main Stage cast member of Improv Asylum. He is a member of The Groundlings, an improv and sketch comedy troupe based in Los Angeles. A 2011 L.A. Times review noted his performance along with Charlotte Newhouse and Laurel Coppock as "a cappella singers who enthusiastically perform Toto's 'Africa' even though they are missing six members of their group ('Throat Culture') and know only the background and percussion parts". He has starred on the Seeso series Bajillion Dollar Propertie$ and the TBS comedy The Last O.G.

== Filmography ==
=== Film ===
Year	Title	Role	Notes
2013	Identity Thief	Bartender	
2014	Space Station 76	Chuck	
2016	Mascots	'Does This Smell Normal' Man	
2017	Killing Gunther	Barold	
2017	Father Figures	Sean O'Callaghan	
2018	The Happytime Murders	Officer Milligan	
2019	Between Two Ferns: The Movie	Cameron "Cam" Campbell	
2023	The Donor Party	Todd	
2023	Paint	Vermont Mountain Express	

=== Television ===
Year	Title	Role	Notes
2003	Jimmy Kimmel Live!	Ameritrade Spokesman	Episode #1.1
2008	10 Items or Less	Jim	Episode: "Dollar Day Afternoon"
2010	Modern Family	Lance	Episode: "Halloween"
2011	2 Broke Girls	Jeremy	Episode: "And the '90s Horse Party"
2012	Hot in Cleveland	Hotel Employee	Episode: "How Did You Guys Meet, Anyway?"
2012	Are You There, Chelsea?	Matt Gunn	Episode: "Sloane's Ex"
2013	Hart of Dixie	Dale King	Episode: "Where I Lead Me"
2013	It's Always Sunny in Philadelphia	Greg	Episode: "The Gang Tries Desperately to Win an Award"
2013	Super Fun Night	Michael	2 episodes
2014–2015	House of Lies	Will	9 episodes
2014–2016	Idiotsitter	McCallister Dobbs	2 episodes
2015	Workaholics	Himself	Episode: "The Slump"
2016	Comedy Bang! Bang!	Sammy Aukerman	Episode: "Ben Folds Wears a Black Button Down and Jeans"
2016–2019	Superstore	Adam	10 episodes
2016–2019	Bajillion Dollar Propertie$	Andrew Wright	34 episodes
2017	The Fake News with Ted Nelms	Mike Rotch	Episode #1.1
2017–2018	SuperMansion	Various voices	2 episodes
2018	Mike Tyson Mysteries	Jonathan Bowman (voice)	Episode: "The Gift"
2018–2021	The Last O.G.	Josh Birkeland	Main cast
2024	Make Some Noise	Himself	Episode: "A Basketball Player's Far Too Elaborate Free Throw Routine"
