= It's Always Sunny in Philadelphia season 8 =

2012 season of American television series

It's Always Sunny in Philadelphia
- Season 8
- DVD cover
- Starring: Charlie Day; Glenn Howerton; Rob McElhenney; Kaitlin Olson; Danny DeVito
- No. of episodes: 10

Release
- Original network: FX
- Original release: October 11 – December 20, 2012

Season chronology
- ← Previous; Season 7 Next → Season 9

The eighth season of the American television sitcom series It's Always Sunny in Philadelphia premiered on FX on October 11, 2012. The season consists of 10 episodes, and concluded airing on December 20, 2012.

== Cast ==
=== Main cast ===
- Charlie Day as Charlie Kelly
- Glenn Howerton as Dennis Reynolds
- Rob McElhenney as Mac
- Kaitlin Olson as Deandra "Dee" Reynolds
- Danny DeVito as Frank Reynolds

=== Guest stars ===
- Tom Bower as Pop Pop
- Brian Unger as The Attorney
- David Hornsby as Cricket
- Richard Ruccolo as Corporate Rep
- Jimmi Simpson as Liam McPoyle
- Nate Mooney as Ryan McPoyle
- Catherine Reitman as Maureen Ponderosa
- Lance Barber as Bill Ponderosa
- Jeremy Ratchford as Detective
- Thesy Surface as Margaret McPoyle
- Guillermo del Toro as Pappy McPoyle
- Sianoa Smit-McPhee as Bridesmaid
- Mary Elizabeth Ellis as The Waitress
- Josh Casaubon as Trevor Taft
- Alexandra Daddario as Ruby Taft
- Steve Tom as Jameson Taft
- Kerri Kenney as Therapist
- Sean "Diddy" Combs as Dr. Jinx
- Lynne Marie Stewart as Bonnie Kelly
- Sandy Martin as Mrs. Mac
- Artemis Pebdani as Artemis
- Paul Bartholomew as Psychic John
- Alejandro Patino as Mr. Juarez
- Joel Murray as Andrew Kane
- Gerald Downey as Bill Larkin
- Cheryl Lynn Bowers as Queen of Thrones
- Michael Naughton as Waiter

== Episodes ==
No. overall	No. in season	Title	Directed by	Written by	Original release date	Prod. code	US viewers (millions)
85	1	"Pop-Pop: The Final Solution"	Matt Shakman	Charlie Day & Glenn Howerton & Rob McElhenney	October 11, 2012	XIP08002	1.05
Dennis and Dee are given the difficult decision of whether their grandfather Pop-Pop should continue to live on life support. Meanwhile, Charlie, Mac, and Frank search Pop-Pop's Nazi memorabilia for a dog painting said to be created by Adolf Hitler during his failed time as an artist.
86	2	"The Gang Recycles Their Trash"	Matt Shakman	Charlie Day & Glenn Howerton & Rob McElhenney	October 18, 2012	XIP08001	1.10
When Philadelphia's trashmen go on strike, the Gang decides to go into business for themselves: Mac, Dennis and Charlie use a limousine to collect trash from Philadelphia's rich while Frank and Dee try to undermine the union by getting the city's garbage contract.
87	3	"The Maureen Ponderosa Wedding Massacre"	Richie Keen	Charlie Day & Glenn Howerton & Rob McElhenney	October 25, 2012	XIP08009	1.12
In this parody of zombie horror movies, Dennis, Mac, Frank, and Charlie are arrested after everyone goes on an insane rampage at the McPoyles' wedding, Dennis lives in fear of a horrible thing he did to his ex-wife Maureen, and Sweet Dee freaks out over her crashed car.
88	4	"Charlie and Dee Find Love"	Richie Keen	Charlie Day & Glenn Howerton & Rob McElhenney	November 1, 2012	XIP08006	1.39
Charlie finally lets go of The Waitress and he and Dee find themselves mingling with society's elite; each manages to find a love interest that inspires them to stick around for a tennis tournament that gets out of control.
89	5	"The Gang Gets Analyzed"	Todd Biermann	Luvh Rakhe	November 8, 2012	XIP08005	1.11
The Gang visits Dee's therapist to determine whose turn it is to wash the dishes.
90	6	"Charlie's Mom Has Cancer"	Richie Keen	Scott Marder & Rob Rosell	November 15, 2012	XIP08008	0.94
Charlie's mother says she has lung cancer and needs money for an operation. Meanwhile, Dee and Frank think Barbara is still alive and hiding money; and Dennis tries to shock some emotion into himself.
91	7	"Frank's Back in Business"	Richie Keen	Dave Chernin & John Chernin	November 29, 2012	XIP08007	1.08
When Frank's old company runs into trouble, he puts on his CEO suit and heads into the corporate jungle, but his decision to make Charlie his right-hand man isn't the best; Dennis is mistaken for a Canadian businessman after finding his wallet at the bar and uses his new identity in disturbing ways.
92	8	"Charlie Rules the World"	Matt Shakman	David Hornsby	December 6, 2012	XIP08003	1.01
Charlie, Dee, Mac, and Frank become immersed in an online role-playing game; Dennis goes inside a sensory-deprivation tank to answer questions about reality.
93	9	"The Gang Dines Out"	Matt Shakman	Mehar Sethi	December 13, 2012	XIP08004	0.92
The Gang goes to Guigino's Italian Restaurant in separate groups, each of which causes a scene when they fear that one of the groups is planning to publicly humiliate them.
94	10	"Reynolds vs. Reynolds: The Cereal Defense"	Richie Keen	Charlie Day & Glenn Howerton & Rob McElhenney	December 20, 2012	XIP08010	0.94
Frank and Dennis stage a mock trial after Frank crashes his car into Dennis' while Dennis was eating cereal at a red light.

== Reception ==
The eighth season received positive reviews. On Rotten Tomatoes, it has an approval rating of 100% with an average score of 7.4 out of 10 based on 14 reviews. The website's critical consensus reads, "Always Sunny's eighth season, holding no greater ambition than to just let the Gang humiliate themselves through a succession of depraved hijinks, excels at its goal with gut-busting results."

== Home media ==
It's Always Sunny in Philadelphia: The Complete Season 8
Set details	Special features
10 episodes; 2-disc set; Technical specifications: Anamorphic widescreen (1.78:1); English Dolby Digital 5.1 (DVD), DTS-HD Master Audio 5.1 (Blu-ray); English SDH, French, Spanish subtitles	Audio commentaries on selected episodes; Deleted scenes; Gag reel; "Lady House" featurette; Frank Reynolds' How to Be a Warthog; "Fat Mac: In Memoriam"
Release dates
Region 1
September 3, 2013
