= Clueless (TV series) =

American television series based on the movie of the same name

- Genre: Teen sitcom
- Created by: Amy Heckerling
- Starring: Rachel Blanchard; Stacey Dash; Donald Faison; Elisa Donovan; David Lascher; Twink Caplan; Michael Lerner; Wallace Shawn; Sean Holland; Doug Sheehan
- Narrated by: Rachel Blanchard
- Opening theme: "Ordinary Girl" performed by China Forbes
- Composer: David Kitay
- Country of origin: United States
- Original language: English
- No. of seasons: 3
- No. of episodes: 62 (list of episodes)

Production
- Executive producers: Amy Heckerling; Tim O'Donnell
- Producer: Rachel Blanchard
- Camera setup: Film; Single-camera
- Running time: 23 minutes
- Production companies: Cockamamie Productions; Paramount Television

Original release
- Network: ABC
- Release: September 20, 1996 – February 14, 1997
- Network: UPN
- Release: September 23, 1997 – May 25, 1999

Clueless is an American television teen sitcom based on the 1995 film of the same name (which was inspired by Jane Austen's 1815 novel Emma), serving as a sequel to the film. It aired on ABC from September 20, 1996 to February 14, 1997, as a part of the TGIF lineup during its first season. The series then spent its last two seasons on UPN, airing from September 23, 1997 to May 25, 1999. Alicia Silverstone had a development deal with Columbia-TriStar at this time, and was unable to reprise her role from the film.

== Premise ==
Clueless is a teen comedy that follows the adventures of Cher Horowitz, a California girl who attends Bronson Alcott High. Cher and her friends navigate the ups and downs of high school life as they face struggles with relationships, school, and social status.

== Episodes ==
Season	Episodes	Originally released		
Season	Episodes	First released	Last released	Network
1	18	September 20, 1996	February 14, 1997	ABC
2	22	September 23, 1997	May 19, 1998	UPN
3	22	October 6, 1998	May 25, 1999	UPN

== Cast and characters ==
The main characters of Clueless, (from left to right), Amber, Sean, Dionne, Murray, and Cher.

=== Main ===
- Rachel Blanchard as Cher Horowitz
- Stacey Dash as Dionne "Dee" Davenport
- Donald Adeosun Faison as Murray Duvall
- Elisa Donovan as Amber Mariens
- David Lascher as Josh Lucas (season 1)
- Twink Caplan as Mrs. Geist-Hall (season 1)
- Michael Lerner (season 1) and Doug Sheehan (seasons 2–3) as Mel Horowitz
- Wallace Shawn as Mr. Alphonse Hall (season 1)
- Sean Holland as Sean Holiday (seasons 1–3; recurring, episodes 1–13)

=== Recurring ===
- Danny Strong as Marshall Gasner
- Julie Brown as Coach Millie Diemer

=== Special guest stars ===
- Melissa Joan Hart as Sabrina Spellman (from the TV series Sabrina the Teenage Witch)
- Brittany Murphy as Jasmine
- Lamont Bentley as Hakeem Campbell
- Shar Jackson as Niecy Jackson
- Breckin Meyer as Harrison
- Paul Rudd as Sonny
- Jennifer Elise Cox as Felice Lesser
- Connie Stevens as Ms. Dewitt

== Production ==
=== Conception ===
Though the television program is based on the film, director Amy Heckerling intended it to be a television show for Fox. It eventually was picked up by Paramount as a film, which then led to the television series. Rachel Blanchard played the role of Cher that was originated by Alicia Silverstone in the film. Stacey Dash (Dionne), Donald Faison (Murray), Elisa Donovan (Amber), Wallace Shawn (Mr. Hall), and Twink Caplan (Ms. Geist) all reprised their film roles for the television series. Sean Holland, who appeared as Lawrence in the film, portrayed the new character Sean Holiday in the television series. The program aired on ABC from 1996 to 1997 and with a network change to UPN from 1997 to 1999. The theme song for the television series, "Ordinary Girl," was written by Charlotte Caffey (of The Go-Go's) and Anna Waronker, and was performed by China Forbes.

=== Differences from the movie ===
There are several notable inconsistencies in both characters and storylines between the Clueless film and the subsequent television series.

In addition to Rachel Blanchard as Cher, two other major roles were recast for the television series. The role of Cher's father Mel, the part Dan Hedaya originated in the film, was portrayed by Michael Lerner and was again recast with Doug Sheehan by the beginning of the show's second season on the air. By this time, Mel had grown significantly more mellow and humane than the character Hedaya had originated.

David Lascher took over the role of Josh from Paul Rudd in the television series, and the idea of having the character serve as a romantic interest for Cher was almost nonexistent in the television storylines, while it was a major part of the plot of the film version. By the time the show moved to UPN, Josh was written out of the series entirely. Mr. Hall and Ms. Geist shared the same fate and were also written out of the show by the time it switched networks.

Julie Brown's character in the original film was Coach Millie Stoeger, but in the television series her character's name was changed to Millie Diemer. In addition, Sean Holland, who only had a very minor role in the film as Murray's friend Lawrence, was playing a new character named Sean Holiday. Regardless, Holland's character had significantly more exposure on the television series (and was considered one of its stars) than the character of Tai Frasier (who was also recast with Heather Gottlieb when Brittany Murphy opted not to reprise the role), who only appeared in three episodes of the show, despite being one of the main characters in the film. The character of Christian, played by Justin Walker, was not included in the television series at all. Amy Heckerling, who wrote and directed the film, also wrote and directed several episodes of the show's first season, but did not remain on board with the series subsequently.

Although they did not reprise their original roles of Josh, Travis and Tai, actors Paul Rudd, Breckin Meyer and Brittany Murphy all made guest appearances in one episode each on the series as new characters; Meyer portrayed Harrison in the episode "Do We with Bad Haircuts Not Feel?", Rudd portrayed Sonny in the episode "I Got You, Babe," and Murphy played Jasmine in the episode "Driving Me Crazy." Nicole Bilderback, who played Summer in the movie, returned for three episodes although her character's name was changed to Nicole.

The band Luscious Jackson, who performed the dance song "Here" for the Clueless movie soundtrack, also guest starred on the series in the episode "Sharing Cher" in order to perform their song "Naked Eye."

A few of the show's first-season episodes were broadcast out of order. The first episode to be broadcast was "As If a Girl's Reach Should Exceed Her Grasp" on September 20, 1996. The actual pilot episode, "Don't Stand So Close to Me," aired later on November 1, 1996.

=== Network change ===
After the series was canceled by ABC, the reruns of the episodes on their Friday night TGIF line-up proved to be ratings winners for ABC. However, it was too late for ABC to get the series back, and they prevented UPN from broadcasting the series until their contract ran out in late September. Clueless finished #46 in the ratings with 13.3 million viewers. Only Sabrina the Teenage Witch (a show on which Elisa Donovan, Donald Faison and David Lascher would eventually become regulars) had higher ratings for Friday. Reportedly, the star of Sabrina, Melissa Joan Hart, was considered for the part of Cher on the Clueless television series.

UPN cancelled the show after the third season (1998–1999)

=== Crossovers ===
==== Sabrina the Teenage Witch ====
During the Season 1 episode "Mr. Wright", Melissa Joan Hart makes a cameo appearance playing Sabrina Spellman, her character on the ABC sitcom Sabrina the Teenage Witch (although she is not mentioned by name). At the end of the episode, Cher and Sabrina walk out of a building together, and Cher seems confused that Sabrina has apparently attended Bronson Alcott High School since September of that year. Cher had never seen Sabrina before, despite the fact that Cher knows everyone. Sabrina then says, "What, Cher, you think I just snapped my fingers and magically appeared? As if!" Once Cher's back is turned, Sabrina snaps her fingers and disappears, completely baffling Cher.

==== Moesha ====
In a Halloween-themed episode spoofing the popular Scream films, Cher, Dionne and Amber try to catch a stalker. Later, Amber hints at a Moesha crossover after calling out Moesha's name when the girls are looking for Murray and Sean. Shar Jackson and Lamont Bentley also appeared in a later episode in the roles of their Moesha characters. The crossover was designed to promote Brandy's upcoming film I Still Know What You Did Last Summer.

== Broadcast and syndication ==
The series originally premiered on ABC on September 20, 1996, as a part of the TGIF Friday Night lineup during its first season. It then spent its last two seasons on UPN on Tuesday nights ending on May 25, 1999, but later entered off-network syndication in fall 2000 along with Sabrina the Teenage Witch, Moesha and 7th Heaven, all of which are currently owned by CBS Media Ventures. It was the only series out of the four that was not picked up for a second season of syndication. Reruns later aired on The N until September 2009.

In Canada, it was previously broadcast on MuchMusic, following Sabrina reruns. In New Zealand, it aired on Saturday and Sundays at 5:30pm on defunct channel FOUR, following Sabrina reruns. In the United Kingdom it was previously aired on CITV, ITV (early morning broadcasts), Trouble, Paramount Comedy Channel and later on Trace Vault. In Latin America, it was previously aired on Nickelodeon.

In Italy, it was broadcast on Rai 2 under the name Ragazze a Beverly Hills (Girls in Beverly Hills) in 2003, and later on MTV with the original name.

International rights are since then currently held by the show's production company and distributor Paramount Global via its Content Distribution label, but a remastered version is yet to be released by Paramount themselves for the show's 30th anniversary.
