= Maggie Riley =

British actress

- Born: 1936
- Died: 10 October 2015 (aged 78–79)
- Occupation: actress
- Years active: 1966–2009

Maggie Riley (1936 – 10 October 2015) was an English actress, best known for her roles as Maureen in Hazell and Mrs. McMahon in children's television series Grange Hill.

A member of Olivier's National Theatre company, she made frequent appearances on British TV from the 1960s.

She died on 10 October 2015 at the age of 79 after a long illness.

== Credits ==
=== Television ===
Year	Title	Role	Notes
1966	The Likely Lads	Waitress	
1975	Centre Play	Margaret	
1976	Couples	Anne Latimer	9 episodes
1976	Within These Walls	Clara Prentice	
1976	The Crezz	Miss Paris	
1977	Warship	Louise Witzel	
1978	Hazell	Maureen	8 episodes
1978	Play for Today	Mrs. Richmond	
1979–1981	Grange Hill	Mrs. McMahon	6 episodes
1980	Lady Killers	Mrs. Eaves	1 episode
1980	Shoestring	Marjorie	
1980	Play for Today	Pauline	
1982	Saturday Night Thriller	Barbara Lewis	
1982	Nobody's Hero	Dorothy Ellis	2 episodes
1984	Missing from Home	Farmer's wife	
1985	Screen Two	Mrs. Philpot	
1985	Me and My Girl	Shop Assistant	
1986	Bluebell	Madame Cummings	
2001	Doctors	Elsie Banks	

=== Film ===
Year	Title	Role	Notes
1969	The Dance of Death	Karen	
2003	Assisted Living	Mrs. Pearlman	
2009	Spooky Tales	Granny Cobb	
