= Flight 980 =

Flight 980 may refer to

- ALM Flight 980, ditched on 2 May 1970
- Eastern Air Lines Flight 980, crashed on 1 January 1985
