= List of Clueless episodes =

This is a list of episodes of the 1996–1999 ABC/UPN sitcom Clueless. A total of 62 episodes were produced spanning three seasons airing from September 20, 1996 to May 25, 1999.

== Series overview ==
Season	Episodes	Originally released		
Season	Episodes	First released	Last released	Network
1	18	September 20, 1996	February 14, 1997	ABC
2	22	September 23, 1997	May 19, 1998	UPN
3	22	October 6, 1998	May 25, 1999	UPN

== Episodes ==
=== Season 1 (1996–97) ===
No. overall	No. in season	Title	Directed by	Written by	Original release date	Viewers (millions)
1	1	"As If a Girl's Reach Should Exceed Her Grasp"	Amy Heckerling	Amy Heckerling & Pamela Pettler	September 20, 1996	14.6
Cher takes over as "Miss Buzzline", the school's newspaper advice column, but her bad advice causes trouble with her friends.
2	2	"To Party or Not to Party"	John Fortenberry	Julie Brown	September 27, 1996	13.7
Cher enrolls into drama class and meets a handsome guy named Donal (Christopher Daniel Barnes). They then set a date at a late-night Jazz club, despite Mel giving Cher a strict curfew.
3	3	"City Beautification"	Damon Santostefano	Joe Stillman	October 4, 1996	13.2
Cher and Dionne volunteer to clean a local city park.
4	4	"Do We with Bad Haircuts Not Feel?"	Amy Heckerling	Amy Heckerling & Pamela Pettler	October 11, 1996	11.7
Cher gets a bad haircut from a celebrity hairdresser (Bronson Pinchot).
5	5	"We Shall Overpack"	Paul Bartel	Amy Engelberg & Wendy Engelberg	October 18, 1996	14.0
During a class presentation, Miss Geist falls over a backpack and gets hurt. The Headmaster forbids the students from now on to carry backpacks. Cher and Dionne do not accept this ban and organize a protest.
6	6	"Making Up is Hard to Do"	John Fortenberry	Tracy Gamble & Richard Vaczy	October 25, 1996	13.5
Dionne and Murray break up, with Cher playing mediator between their arguing.
7	7	"Don't Stand So Close to Me"	Amy Heckerling	Amy Heckerling	November 1, 1996	14.0
After Mel puts her on a strict budget, Cher tries to search for the "perfect" outfit to impress her substitute teacher while Mr. Hall's sick. Note: This is the pilot episode of the series.
8	8	"Kiss Me Kip"	John Fortenberry	Julie Brown	November 8, 1996	12.9
Cher's new crush is the actor Kip Killmore, who hires Mel as his lawyer. She then finds out that Kip isn't as dreamy as she once thought.
9	9	"I Got You Babe"	Amy Heckerling	Amy Heckerling	November 15, 1996	13.2
Cher falls deeply in love with a college student. What's so ironic about is that his name is Sonny (Paul Rudd). They are a match made in heaven until Sonny finds out how old Cher is.
10	10	"Driving Me Crazy"	John Fortenberry	Amy Engelberg & Wendy Engelberg	November 22, 1996	13.5
Cher becomes determined to get her driver's license. Brittany Murphy guest stars as Jasmine, a transfer student from New York.
11	11	"Romeo & Cher"	Rusty Cundieff	Story by : Susan Meyers & Judy Toll; Teleplay by : Amy Engelberg & Wendy Engelberg	December 13, 1996	13.3
Cher falls for the son of Mel's legal rival.
12	12	"Cher, Inc."	Paul Bartel	Amy Engelberg & Wendy Engelberg	December 20, 1996	12.7
Cher starts a fashion muff business.
13	13	"Fixing Up Daddy"	Joe Pennella	Sandra Tsing Loh	January 3, 1997	13.09
Cher sets Mel up with Sheila Kendall (Donna Pescow), a successful lawyer and author. But putting the two together makes Cher feel neglected.
14	14	"The Party's Over"	Linda Day	Tim O'Donnell	January 10, 1997	14.12
The Bronson Alcott High School receives a new head mistress Miss DeWitt (Connie Stevens), who forbids cell phones, miniskirts and suspends Mr. Hall.
15	15	"I'm in with the Out Crowd"	John Tracy	Amy Engelberg & Wendy Engelberg	January 24, 1997	13.66
Cher finds herself partnered with the school genius/total geek, Felice Lesser (Jennifer Elise Cox) (also known as "Fleas Loser"). Despite coming from different social circles, Cher is shocked to discover that she genuinely likes Felice, and must decide whether to keep being friends with her once the project is over, despite what it could mean for her social standing at Bronson Alcott High.
16	16	"All Teed Off"	Neal Israel	Tim O'Donnell	January 31, 1997	13.14
Murray and Sean are having a new passion – golf - with Dionne feeling neglected. She then seeks advice from Cher, who suddenly teams up with Dionne against Murray and Sean in a "Battle of the Sexes" golf game.
17	17	"Mr. Wright"	Henry Winkler	Julie Brown	February 7, 1997	13.08
Cher becomes attracted to the new student David Wright (Seth Peterson), who seems like the perfect guy. But she soon figures out that he is not as perfect as she assumed. Melissa Joan Hart guest stars as Sabrina Spellman (from the series Sabrina the Teenage Witch). The title is a reference from a Julie Brown earlier work, Earth Girls Are Easy, in which the main character is seeking true love, her "Mr. Right".
18	18	"Secrets & Lies"	Paris Barclay	Amy Engelberg & Wendy Engelberg	February 14, 1997	12.96
It's Valentine's Day and Cher unintentionally tells Murray that Sean and Dionne once dated which sends Murray on a jealous rage. Note: This was the last episode of the series to air on ABC, As well as David Lascher, Twink Caplan, Michael Lerner and Wallace Shawn making their final appearances.

=== Season 2 (1997–98) ===
No. overall	No. in season	Title	Directed by	Written by	Original release date	Viewers (millions)
19	1	"Back to School"	Tim O'Donnell	Amy Engelberg & Wendy Engelberg	September 23, 1997	4.43
Cher gets a new job at a television company, and her sorority friends remain sorority girls. Meanwhile, her wavy black buff boyfriend is happy that it "is all over." Note: This is the first episode to air on UPN and Doug Sheehan joins the cast as Mel Horwitz replacing Michael Lerner.
20	2	"Salsa, Chlorine & Tears"	Linda Day	Valerie Ahern & Christian McLaughlin	September 30, 1997	4.19
Cher has fallen in love with Ricardo (Jacob Vargas), a young Mexican singer from a salsa club. But then it turns out that he is cleaning pools during the day and is also a bad kisser. And he founds out the same applies to her.
21	3	"Suddenly Stupid"	Linda Day	Amy Engelberg & Wendy Engelberg	October 7, 1997	4.00
Cher and Dionne once again help Felice, who dumbs herself down to have guys interested in her.
22	4	"Sharing Cher"	Anson Williams	Valerie Ahern & Christian McLaughlin	October 14, 1997	4.48
Dionne and Amber compete for Cher's attention to attend a Luscious Jackson concert.
23	5	"Chick Fight Tonight"	John Tracy	Julie Brown	October 21, 1997	3.42
A new girl named Oddrey (Linda Cardellini), who is completely different from everyone else at school, challenges Cher to a fight.
24	6	"Trick or Treat"	Joanna Kerns	Brad Johnson	October 28, 1997	4.47
Cher, Dionne, Sean and Murray are invited by Amber to attend an exclusive Hollywood Halloween party, which turns out to be a stage crew party instead.
25	7	"Homecoming Queen"	Neal Israel	Julie Brown	November 4, 1997	4.86
The election to the homecoming queen is approaching. Cher is angry, when she discovers that her secret admirer Marshall (Danny Strong) suggested her as a candidate.
26	8	"Shop 'Til You Drop"	Henry Winkler	Tom J. Astle	November 11, 1997	3.80
Cher and Dionne have a hard time with their woodshop class being taught by Mr. Hubley (Tim Conway), a misogynist.
27	9	"The Intruder"	Tim O'Donnell	Brad Johnson	November 18, 1997	4.97
Mel unexpectedly shows up at Cher's Parent-Teacher conference, and becomes interested in her art teacher, Ms. Rebecca Morgan (Deborah Harmon).
28	10	"Intruder Spawn"	Linda Day	Valerie Ahern & Christian McLaughlin	November 25, 1997	3.85
Mel and Rebecca go on vacation to Newport Beach and Cher volunteers to babysit Rebecca's son, Cody (Blake McIver Ewing).
29	11	"Valley of the Malls"	John Tracy	Shannon O'Donnell	December 9, 1997	4.72
Cher gets a job at a record store in The Valley to pay for a birthday gift for Mel. She begins falling for her boss, Brian (Brad Rowe), who unfortunately dislikes Beverly Hills girls.
30	12	"A Very P.C. Holiday"	John Tracy	Amy Engelberg & Wendy Engelberg	December 16, 1997	2.91
Hoping to give Mel an innovative Hanukkah present, Cher auditions to sing in the school pageant.
31	13	"Labor of Love"	Linda Day	Brad Johnson	January 13, 1998	3.73
Cher and her friends observe professionals off campus for the annual career day.
32	14	"Dance Fever"	Tim O'Donnell	Amy Engelberg & Wendy Engelberg	February 3, 1998	2.53
Everyone interrupts Cher's chance to dance with a potential boyfriend at the dance.
33	15	"In Boyfriend We Trust"	Linda Day	Amy Engelberg & Wendy Engelberg	February 24, 1998	3.18
Cher spots her new boyfriend with his ex.
34	16	"The Joint"	Linda Day	Brad Johnson	March 3, 1998	3.16
Dionne and Cher's old friend, Emily, surprises them both when she returns from New York. But, much to their surprise, Emily is now a morbid goth, and later gets them in trouble for smoking a joint. Meanwhile, Sean and Murray go camping with Mel and Emily's father.
35	17	"Life is a Beach"	Joanna Kerns	Julie Brown	March 17, 1998	3.10
Cher and friends act out their fantasies at the beach.
36	18	"P.G. Seventeen"	Neal Israel	Brad Johnson	April 14, 1998	2.59
Cher and friends learn a friend must postpone college due to an unplanned pregnancy.
37	19	"Let's Stay Together"	John Tracy	Valerie Ahern & Christian McLaughlin	April 28, 1998	2.86
Dionne and Murray break up right before Cher's birthday party.
38	20	"Friends"	Linda Day	Amy Engelberg & Wendy Engelberg	May 5, 1998	2.88
Newly separated Murray and Dionne pretend to have dates to spark jealousy. Meanwhile, Cher, Amber and Sean visit a retirement home to gain extra credit at school. There, they meet people with personalities similar to their own.
39	21	"Sean's Video"	Linda Day	Shannon O'Donnell	May 12, 1998	2.76
Cher directs Sean and the gang in a music video.
40	22	"Cashless"	Tim O'Donnell	Valerie Ahern & Christian McLaughlin	May 19, 1998	2.60
Cher has a garage sale when the family accountant leaves them penniless.

=== Season 3 (1998–99) ===
No. overall	No. in season	Title	Directed by	Written by	Original release date	Viewers (millions)
41	1	"Bakersfield Blues"	Tim O'Donnell	Tim O'Donnell	October 6, 1998	3.35
Cher and Mel adjust to life in Bakersfield. Dionne, Sean and Murray plan to visit Cher after they learn that Amber has moved into Cher's home with her family.
42	2	"Back from Bakersfield"	Tim O'Donnell	Tim O'Donnell	October 13, 1998	2.26
Cher's friends decide to rescue her and bring her back to Beverly Hills by finding Mel a huge case that he can use his lawyer skills on to make money and move back home.
43	3	"Model Smoker"	Linda Day	Adam Hamburger & David Hamburger	October 20, 1998	3.05
Cher falls for a handsome model and then learns he's a smoker.
44	4	"Scream Murray, Scream! (Part 1)"	Neal Israel	Brad Johnson	October 27, 1998	3.03
Frightening phone calls scare Cher and Dionne while a killer stalks the gang. This episode and the episode following it, parodies the Scream films.
45	5	"Scream Again, Murray, Scream Again! (Part 2)"	Neal Israel	Brad Johnson	November 3, 1998	2.65
The gang must find the stalker before their lives turn into real-life horror.
46	6	"Cher and Cher Alike"	Julie Brown	Julie Brown	November 10, 1998	3.13
Cher lands the lead in the school's production of Grease.
47	7	"Father's Keeper"	Linda Day	Stephanie Phillips	November 17, 1998	3.29
Dionne finds a way for Cher to attend college and not worry about Mel.
48	8	"Never P.E.T.A. Squirrel"	Tim O'Donnell	James Krieg	November 24, 1998	2.5
A squirrel terrorizes the Horowitz household on Thanksgiving.
49	9	"Our Lady of Rodeo Drive"	Neal Israel	Brad Johnson	December 15, 1998	3.30
A mechanic believes that a holy apparition resides in Cher's BMW.
50	10	"Nice Girls Finish Last"	Neal Israel	Gene Laufenberg	January 19, 1999	2.76
The gang helps Dionne soften her demeanor.
51	11	"Mercy Date"	Brian K. Roberts	James Krieg	January 26, 1999	2.56
Cher attends a sci-fi convention with Marshall.
52	12	"Child Bride"	Tim O'Donnell	Gene Laufenberg	February 9, 1999	2.86
Cher and Dionne try to stop Amber from marrying an elderly millionaire named Bronson Alcott (Bert Remsen), a man their high school is named after.
53	13	"Popularity"	Neal Israel	Adam Hamburger & David Hamburger	February 16, 1999	2.9
Cher tutors Doug Sampson (Marc Blucas) the school's basketball star, who learns he really dislikes the sport.
54	14	"My Best Friend's Boyfriend"	Joanna Kerns	Stephanie Phillips	February 23, 1999	3.03
Dionne feels betrayed when her boyfriend starts liking Cher.
55	15	"None for the Road"	Daniel Silverberg	James Krieg & Gene Laufenberg	March 2, 1999	3.80
Cher's 18th birthday party is an incredible bash until Sean, Murray and Adam, Cher's current boyfriend, end up in the hospital, leaving tragic news in the end. Guest appearance by NSYNC.
56	16	"Cher's Weekend at Bernie's"	Linda Day	Stephanie Phillips	April 20, 1999	2.21
Cher looks for clues after her teacher, Mr. Bernie Pimmler (Clive Revill) dies.
57	17	"Parent Trap"	Linda Day	Adam Hamburger & David Hamburger	April 20, 1999	1.98
On the verge of divorce, Amber's parents display marital woes in public.
58	18	"Big Sissies"	Neal Israel	Julie Brown	April 27, 1999	1.65
Amber mentors a girl from another part of town and shows her the good life in Beverly Hills.
59	19	"A Test of Character"	Linda Day	Brad Johnson	May 4, 1999	2.39
Dionne joins a band and enters the school talent contest, but fails the mandatory drug test.
60	20	"Prom Misses, Prom Misses"	David Kendall	Gene Laufenberg	May 11, 1999	2.98
Cher and Dionne audition potential prom dates from sign-up sheets, while Amber is escorted by a Leonardo DiCaprio lookalike. Meanwhile, Murray becomes attracted to Sean's prom date, Niecy Jackson (Shar Jackson) and wants to ditch his current date, Lydia (Gabrielle Union). Note: Both Shar Jackson and Lamont Bentley of Moesha guest starred as their characters Niecy Jackson and Hakeem Campbell respectively. During the time that Clueless aired on UPN it followed Moesha on its Tuesday night lineup.
61	21	"Graduation"	Neal Israel	Brad Johnson	May 18, 1999	2.07
Sean is in trouble after his secret of living in a neighborhood outside of the school district is revealed. Meanwhile, Murray reveals that he is going to Africa to work with his father instead of going to college.
62	22	"All Night Senior Party"	Tim O'Donnell	Adam Hamburger & David Hamburger	May 25, 1999	2.26
Due to Murray's announcement to go to Africa, Dionne makes the decision of losing her virginity to him on the night of their senior party. Note: While it was presumed (or implied) in the feature film that Dionne and Murray had been somewhat sexually active, in the television series, Dionne was suddenly a virgin again as it is revealed in this episode. Although Murray was not.
