= Greg Feith =

American safety investigator (born 1957)

- Born: August 5, 1957 (age 69)
- Education: Embry–Riddle Aeronautical University
- Occupations: Aviation Safety Consultant; TV Analyst
- Years active: 1980–present
- Known for: Air Crash Investigations
- Television: Mayday, Seconds from Disaster, Why Planes Crash, NBC, MSNBC
- Honours: Living Legends Of Aviation Inductee 2016
- Website: http://flightsafetydetectives.com/

Gregory Allen Feith (born August 5, 1957) is an American former Senior Air Safety Investigator with the National Transportation Safety Board (NTSB). He currently works as a consultant on aviation safety and security matters in the private sector, and as the aviation expert for NBC and MSNBC. He also serves as the technical advisor in a number of television programs such as Mayday (also known as Air Disasters in the United States and Air Crash Investigation in other parts of the world), Seconds from Disaster, and Why Planes Crash while maintaining a busy speaking schedule.

== Career ==
Feith earned his bachelor's degree in aeronautical studies from Embry-Riddle Aeronautical University in Daytona Beach, Florida, where he currently remains on faculty. Early in his career, Feith was the U.S. Accredited Representative and Team Leader of six American investigators who climbed Mt. Illimani to an elevation of 20,098 feet MSL in 1985, to conduct the on-scene wreckage examination of Eastern Air Lines Flight 980, a Boeing 727. This is the highest accident site in commercial aviation history. He was the Investigator in Charge of the NTSB "Go-Team" from 1993 to 2001. In 2014 Feith was inducted as a member of the Living Legends of Aviation.

Feith is a pilot himself, and owns and flies his Piper PA-24 Comanche. He has a vehicle registration plate of "CRASH1".

== Media ==
Feith has appeared on several television series, such as the Canadian Documentary series Mayday (also known as Air Disasters in the United States and Air Crash Investigation in other parts of the world), Survival in the Sky, Seconds from Disaster and Why Planes Crash. He hosted his own short-lived series Secrets of the Black Box on the History Channel, highlighting the major investigations that he led, along with the controversial and conspiracy theory-riddled KAL007 investigation. He appeared in a made-for-TV movie Crash: The Mystery of Flight 1501 as the co-pilot of the ill-fated DC-9. He is well known for his frequent public speaking engagements at schools, aviation groups and trade associations. In his spare time, he hosts Hangar Flying Today, a radio program in Denver, Colorado, near where he currently resides. Feith contributes articles to Business & Commercial Aviation magazine, including “Avoiding The Beast Below,” September 2002. He appears regularly as a guest aviation safety and security expert on KUSA-TV, NBC, MSNBC, while maintaining a busy speaking schedule with The Aviation Speakers Bureau. As of 2020, he hosts, along with former NTSB member John Goglia, the Flight Safety Detectives podcast.

== Notable investigations ==
- Aloha Airlines Flight 243
- American Airlines Flight 1420
- American Eagle Flight 4184
- British Airways Flight 009
- China Eastern Airlines Flight 583
- Eastern Air Lines Flight 980
- Korean Air Flight 801
- SilkAir Flight 185
- Swissair Flight 111
- USAir Flight 1016
- ValuJet Flight 592
- Emery Worldwide Airlines Flight 17
- American International Airways Flight 808

== Awards ==
- 1996: Laurel Award from Aviation Week and Space Technology Magazine for "Outstanding Operations" for leadership during the conduct of the ValuJet Flight 592 investigation in the Florida Everglades
- 2001: Embry-Riddle Aeronautical University Distinguished Alumni Award
- 2003: SAFE Association, Michael R. Grost Award
- 2016: Inducted as a Living Legend of Aviation at the 13th Annual Living Legends of Aviation Awards.

== Personal ==
Feith is married to Kim Christiansen, anchor of Channel 9News, Denver, and a former Miss Colorado. They have a son, Tanner. Feith had a white dog, named Sky King, taken by a neighbor allegedly demanding a $10,000 ransom for its return.

The New York Times ran a story highlighting air crash investigators for their telegenic appearances and heroic roles in pursuit of the "noble mission: solving crashes to save lives by preventing future accidents", giving personal attention to Greg Feith, recounting how, during his investigations into the Valujet crash in the Everglades, he was given the nickname "Mud Stud" and profiled in news stories. The articles written about him noted his Cadillac with the license plate CRASH1, fan mail from female admirers, and that he was single, with the caveat that he was married to his work.

Feith is a donor to organizations including Shades of Blue, a nonprofit giving underprivileged children the chance to experience flight and AOPA, and develops safety products, among them LapKidz for inflight child seat restraints and drowning accident prevention of children in bathtubs.
