= Clinton National Airport =

Airport in Little Rock, Arkansas, United States

Bill and Hillary Clinton National Airport

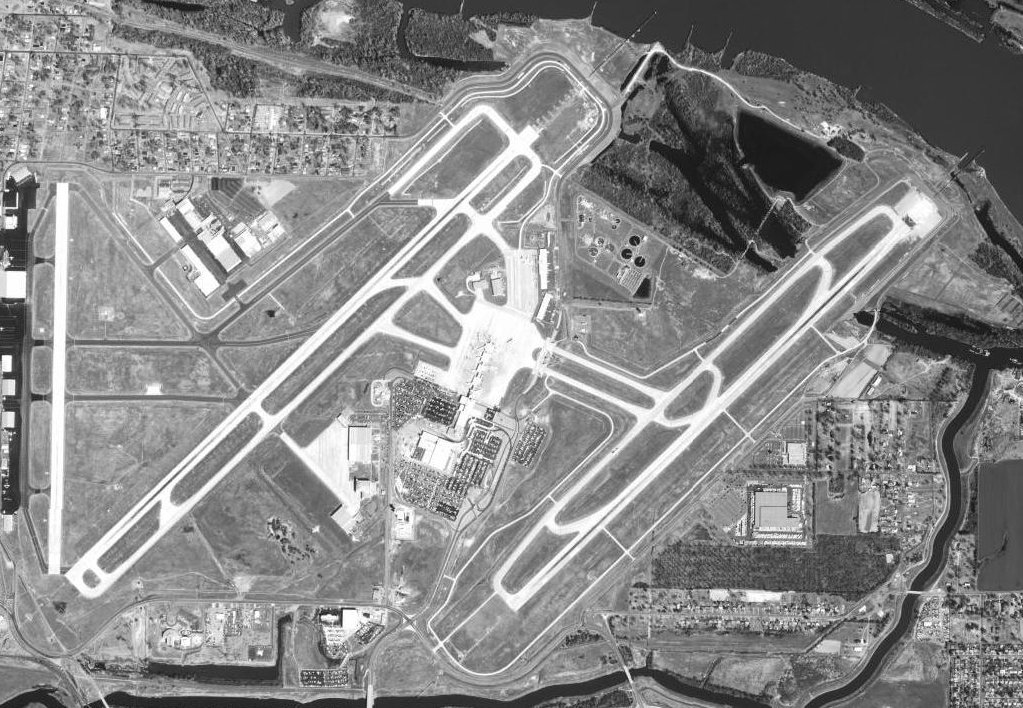
- IATA: LIT; ICAO: KLIT; FAA LID: LIT

Summary
- Airport type: Public
- Owner: City of Little Rock
- Operator: Little Rock Municipal Airport Commission
- Serves: Little Rock
- Opened: June 19, 1931; 95 years ago
- Elevation AMSL: 266 ft (81 m)
- Coordinates: 34°43′48″N 92°13′12″W
- Website: clintonairport.com

Maps
- FAA airport diagram
- Interactive map of Bill and Hillary Clinton National Airport

Runways
Direction	Length		Surface
Direction	ft	m	Surface
04L/22R	8,273	2,522	Concrete
04R/22L	8,251	2,515	Concrete
18/36	6,224	1,897	Concrete

Helipads
Number	Length		Surface
Number	ft	m	Surface
H1	50	15	Concrete

Statistics (2024)
- Total passengers: 2,346,456
- Aircraft operations: 93,047
- Sources: Bill and Hillary Clinton National Airport

Bill and Hillary Clinton National Airport (IATA: LIT, ICAO: KLIT, FAA LID: LIT), also known as Adams Field, is a joint civil-military airport on the east side of Little Rock, Arkansas, United States. It is operated by the Little Rock Municipal Airport Commission.

The second largest commercial airport in Arkansas, it served more than 2.1 million passengers in the year spanning from March 2009 through to February 2010. While Clinton National Airport does not have direct international passenger flights, more than 50 flights arrive or depart at Little Rock each day, with nonstop service to 14 cities. The airport is included in the Federal Aviation Administration (FAA) National Plan of Integrated Airport Systems for 2019–2023, in which it is categorized as a small-hub primary commercial service facility.

== History ==
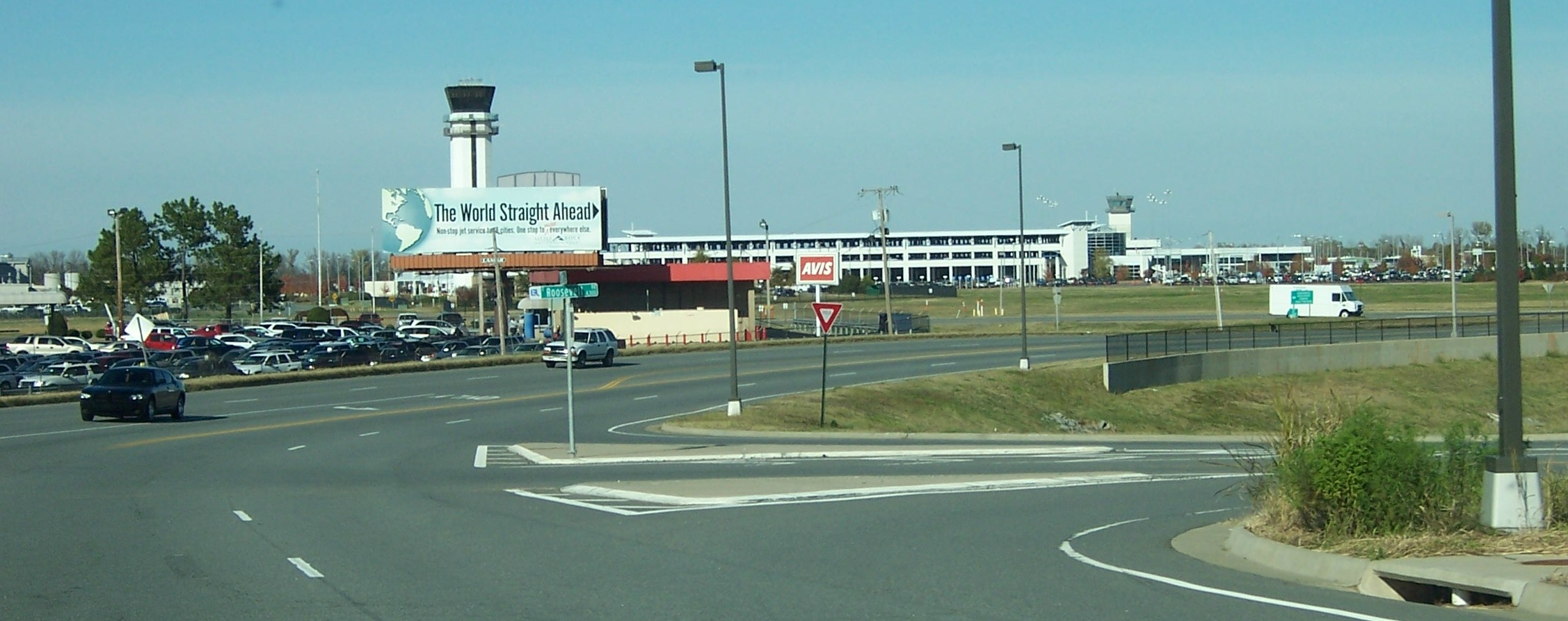
The airport, from an approach road

The airport was originally named Adams Field after Captain George Geyer Adams, 154th Observation Squadron, Arkansas National Guard, who was killed in the line of duty on September 4, 1937. He was a strong advocate for the airport, and also a Little Rock city councilor.

American Airlines was the first airline to serve Little Rock when it first landed at Adams Field on June 19, 1931.

During World War II the airfield was used by the United States Army Air Forces Third Air Force for antisubmarine patrols and training.

In 1972 the airport opened its current 12-gate terminal.

In August 2008, the airport approved a plan to renovate the terminal over a 15-year period. This would expand the terminal from 12 to 16 gates.

On March 20, 2012, the municipal airport commission voted to rename the airport the Bill and Hillary Clinton National Airport, named after Arkansas native, former Governor and United States President Bill Clinton and his wife, United States Secretary of State Hillary Clinton. The name Adams Field will continue to be used when referring to the airport's runways and air traffic, and will be the airport's official designator. In 2017, Republican state Sen. Jason Rapert filed a bill that would have forced the airport to be renamed but relented when he found little support for the measure.

In October 2013, Travel + Leisure released a survey of travelers that ranked Clinton National Airport as the worst of the 67 domestic airports considered in the survey. The survey report cited long lines and few food and shopping choices, among other criticisms. A survey commissioned by the airport contradicted Travel + Leisure's claim, finding that more than 90% of passengers were satisfied with their experience.

In March 2024, the Clinton National Airport's executive director Bryan Malinowski was killed in a shootout with Bureau of Alcohol, Tobacco, Firearms and Explosives (ATF) agents attempting to conduct a pre-dawn raid on his home. An affidavit accused him of illegal gun sales.

== Facilities and aircraft ==
Check-in area

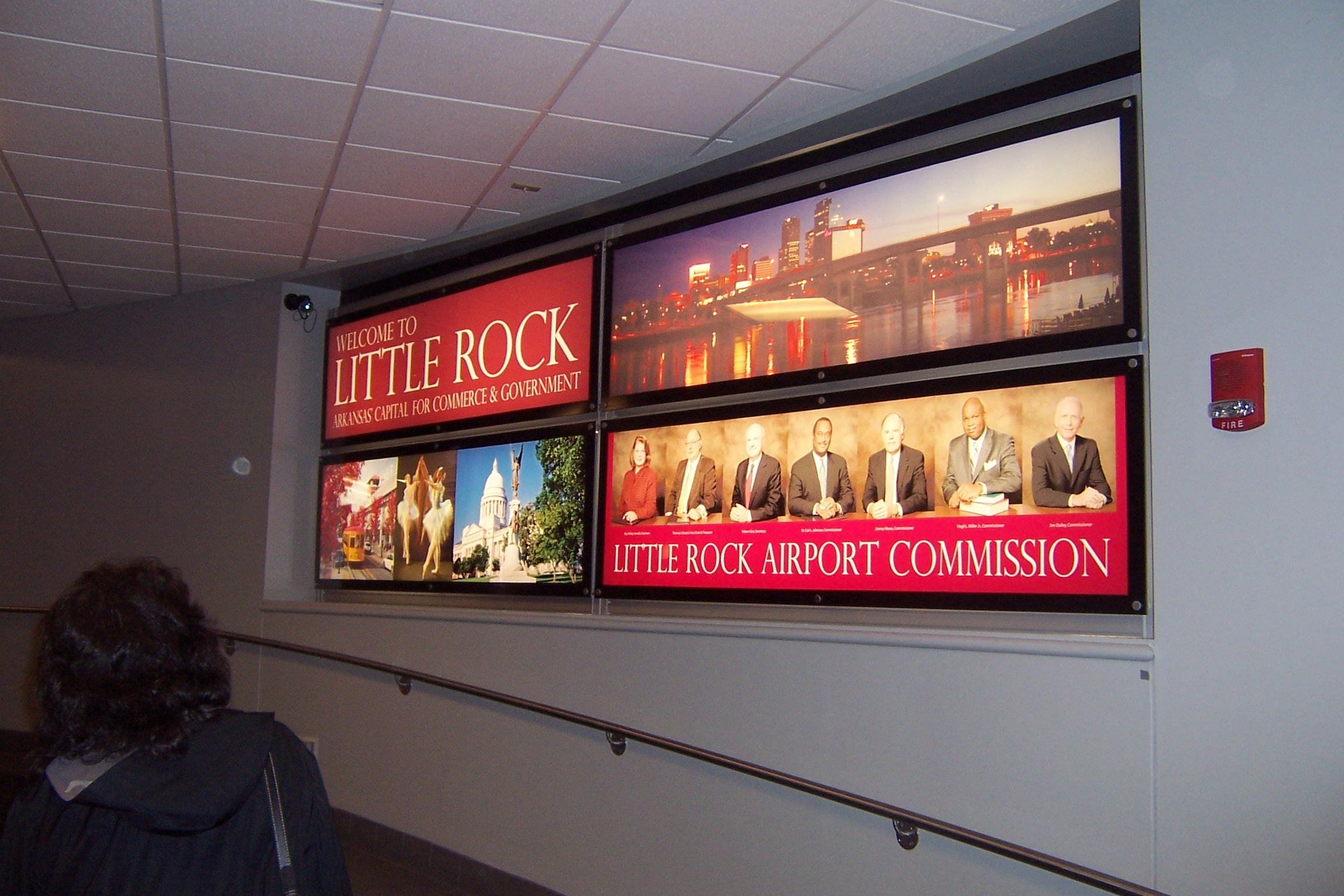
Welcome sign at terminal

Clinton National Airport covers 2,000 acres (809 ha) at an elevation of 266 feet (81 m) above mean sea level. It has three concrete runways: 4L/22R is 8,273 by 150 feet (2,522 x 46 m); 4R/22L is 8,251 by 150 feet (2,515 x 46 m); 18/36 is 6,224 by 150 feet (1,897 x 46 m). It has one concrete helipad 50 by 50 feet (15 x 15 m).

In the year ending February 28, 2023, the airport had 83,217 aircraft operations, an average of 228 per day: 47% general aviation, 26% scheduled commercial, 16% air taxi, and 10% military. The military operations are mostly C-130 transports from nearby Little Rock Air Force Base practicing touch-and-go landings. At that time, 122 aircraft were based at this airport: 42 single-engine, 22 multi-engine, 54 jet, and 4 helicopter.

There are two fixed-base operators (FBOs) on the field: Signature Flight Support and Atlantic Aviation. Central Flying Service, under new ownership, operates on the field offering aircraft maintenance, sales and flight training.

Dassault Aircraft Services (DAS), a subsidiary of Dassault Aviation, operates a large facility at the airport. It is the site of two Falcon aircraft operations: the main Completion Center for all Falcon jets worldwide, and the company-owned Service Center.

Current production model Falcons are manufactured in France, then flown in "green" condition to the Completion Center where optional avionics and custom interiors are installed, and exteriors are painted. Dassault Aircraft Services (DAS) – Little Rock provides inspection, maintenance, modification, completion and repair needs for the Falcon product line.

The Dassault Aircraft Services (DAS) – Little Rock Service Center and Completion Center employs nearly 1,600 people and has a combined occupance of nearly 1,250,000 square feet (116,000 m^{2}), making Little Rock the largest Dassault facility in the world.

=== Terminal ===
A Delta Air Lines Boeing 717-200, pictured in September 2026

The single terminal has twelve gates. Six gates are along the length of the terminal (three on either side) and a rotunda at the end has six more.

== Airlines and destinations ==
=== Passenger ===
Airlines	Destinations
Allegiant Air	Gulf Shores (begins May 20, 2027), Orlando/Sanford; Seasonal: Destin/Fort Walton Beach, St. Petersburg/Clearwater
American Eagle	Charlotte, Chicago–O'Hare, Dallas/Fort Worth, Miami, New York–LaGuardia, Phoenix–Sky Harbor, Washington–National
Delta Air Lines	Atlanta
Delta Connection	New York–LaGuardia, Salt Lake City
Frontier Airlines	Denver
Southwest Airlines	Dallas–Love, Denver, Las Vegas, Nashville; Seasonal: Houston–Hobby, Orlando, Phoenix–Sky Harbor
United Airlines	Denver
United Express	Chicago–O'Hare, Denver, Houston–Intercontinental

Destinations map
Destinations from Clinton National Airport
Red = Year-round destination
Green = Seasonal destination
Blue = Future destination

== Statistics ==
=== Top destinations ===
Busiest domestic routes from LIT (January 2025 – December 2025)
Rank	City	Passengers	Carriers
1	Atlanta, Georgia	239,620	Delta
2	Dallas/Fort Worth, Texas	185,670	American
3	Denver, Colorado	117,410	Frontier, Southwest, United
4	Dallas–Love Field, Texas	107,250	Southwest
5	Chicago–O'Hare, Illinois	102,830	American, United
6	Houston–Intercontinental, Texas	86,730	United
7	Charlotte, North Carolina	79,280	American
8	St. Louis, Missouri	66,640	Southwest
9	Las Vegas, Nevada	42,520	Southwest
10	New York–LaGuardia	31,110	American, Delta

=== Annual traffic ===
LIT Airport annual traffic, 2019–present
Year	Passengers	% change
2019	2,241,716	—
2020	977,742	▼56.38%
2021	1,695,061	▲73.36%
2022	2,021,040	▲19.23%
2023	2,237,309	▲10.70%
2024	2,346,456	▲4.88%

=== Airline market share ===
Largest airlines at LIT (January 2024 – June 2024)
Rank	Airline	Passengers	Share
1	American Airlines	374,523	33.54%
2	Southwest Airlines	288,522	25.84%
3	Delta Air Lines	248,188	22.23%
4	United Airlines	176,403	15.80%
5	Frontier Airlines	15,197	1.36%
6	Allegiant Air	12,520	1.12%
7	Chartered	1,235	0.11%

== Ground transportation ==
Rock Region Metro currently provides transit service to the airport via METRO Connect Microtransit.

== Accidents and incidents ==
- On January 19, 1990, an Eastman Kodak Grumman Gulfstream II crashed during final approach to Little Rock National Airport; all seven on board were killed. Unfavorable weather conditions and pilot error contributed to the accident.
- On June 1, 1999, American Airlines Flight 1420, a McDonnell Douglas MD-82 with 145 passengers and crew, attempting to land in a severe thunderstorm, overran the end of runway 4R, crashed through a fence and down a rock embankment into a flood plain; killing 10 passengers and the captain.
- On February 22, 2023, a Beechcraft Super King Air took off during gusty winds and heavy rain. Shortly after takeoff, the plane crashed near a 3M plant, killing all five on board. The passengers were members of an environmental firm called CTEH en route to investigate an explosion at a metal factory in Bedford, Ohio.
- On January 21, 2024, a Cirrus SR22 took off from runway 4L and crashed north of the cargo building near Temple Street. The pilot, 62-year-old William Cope, reported a loss of power at take-off and crashed shortly after, at approximately 1:30 PM. He was the only person on board and died in the crash.

== See also ==
- List of airports in Arkansas
- Little Rock station
