= Day by Day (American TV series) =

American television sitcom

- Genre: Sitcom
- Created by: Andy Borowitz; Gary David Goldberg
- Starring: Douglas Sheehan; Linda Kelsey; Christopher Daniel Barnes; Julia Louis-Dreyfus; Courtney Thorne-Smith; Thora Birch
- Theme music composer: Sammy Cahn; Axel Stordahl; Paul Weston
- Opening theme: "Day by Day" performed by Clydine Jackson
- Composer: Robert Kraft
- Country of origin: United States
- Original language: English
- No. of seasons: 2
- No. of episodes: 33

Production
- Camera setup: Multi-camera
- Running time: 22–24 minutes
- Production companies: Ubu Productions; Paramount Television

Original release
- Network: NBC
- Release: February 29, 1988 – June 4, 1989

Related
- Family Ties

Day by Day is an American television sitcom created by Andy Borowitz and Gary David Goldberg, which aired on NBC from February 29, 1988, to June 4, 1989. It stars Douglas Sheehan, Linda Kelsey, Christopher Daniel Barnes, Julia Louis-Dreyfus, Courtney Thorne-Smith, and Thora Birch in her television debut role.

== Synopsis ==
The show centers on Brian and Kate Harper, a married couple with two successful careers (Brian as a stockbroker, Kate as a lawyer) and a teenage son named Ross. After the couple had a second child, their daughter, Emily, they decided to quit their jobs because they had missed all the best times of Ross growing up and decided not to make the same mistake with Emily.

With that thought in mind, they decided to open a daycare center in their home. The episodes mixed stories about the daycare center with those about Ross and his friends. At first, Ross was not too enthusiastic about the idea of his father and mother being at home all the time, because he loved his independence and girl-chasing. He was more than a bit put out with all the bonding his father wanted to do now.

Louis-Dreyfus played Eileen Swift, their materialistic next-door neighbor who was also once a business associate of Brian's. She did not much like the idea of the Harpers running a day care center, and often tried to persuade them both to return to their former careers, always to no avail. Eileen, who was single and childless, was prone to make some very sarcastic quips about the children's activities, but Brian and Kate did not let it bother them.

Thorne-Smith played the baby's nanny Kristin, who also worked in the daycare center. Kristin was perhaps the reason that Ross relented about his parents running the day care center; he had a crush on her.

Day by Day was connected to another NBC series, Family Ties. The family patriarch, Brian Harper (played by Sheehan) was a college roommate of Steven Keaton (Michael Gross). A total of 33 episodes were produced.

=== "A Very Brady Episode" ===
The episode titled "A Very Brady Episode" aired on February 5, 1989, and reunited six cast members from The Brady Bunch – Ann B. Davis, Florence Henderson, Christopher Knight, Mike Lookinland, Maureen McCormick, and Robert Reed.

In this episode, Ross is lectured by Brian and Kate about his poor study habits. Ross's explanation that he was watching a Brady Bunch marathon only angers his parents more, and he is warned to shape up. Ross bemoans his predicament, noting Mike Brady would never yell at him because he had flagging grades.

Ross falls asleep, and finds himself in the opening credits of The Brady Bunch., where he dreams that he is the Bradys' long-lost son, Chuck. After he gets his hair permed at Mike's suggestion, he visits with the various family members (except Greg, Jan, and Cindy), who reprise some of the scenes in the Bradys' most famous episodes ("Chuck" and Marcia running against each other for class president, "Chuck" being bullied by Buddy Hinton episode, etc.)

After "Chuck" gets some advice about his poor grades from Mike, the family begins to repeat their dialogue. "Chuck" wonders what is amiss, and Carol explains what he is seeing is a rerun. Everything becomes chaotic and Ross wakes up, vowing to improve his study habits.

Christopher Daniel Barnes, who played Ross on the series, would later portray Greg Brady in The Brady Bunch Movie and A Very Brady Sequel.

== Cast ==
- Douglas Sheehan as Brian Harper
- Linda Kelsey as Kate Harper
- Christopher Daniel Barnes as Ross Harper
- Julia Louis-Dreyfus as Eileen Swift
- Courtney Thorne-Smith as Kristin Carlson
- Thora Birch as Molly

== Episodes ==
=== Series overview ===
Season	Episodes	Originally released	
Season	Episodes	First released	Last released
1	13	February 29, 1988	May 29, 1988
2	20	October 30, 1988	June 4, 1989

=== Season 1 (1988) ===
No. overall	No. in season	Title	Directed by	Written by	Original release date	Rating/share (households)
1	1	"Birthday Presence"	Will Mackenzie	Andy Borowitz	February 29, 1988	18.6/28
2	2	"How to Succeed in Day Care"	Will Mackenzie	Philip LaZebnik	March 3, 1988	28.1/43
3	3	"One Big Happy Family"	Will Mackenzie	Janis Hirsch	March 6, 1988	17.3/26
4	4	"That Saturday Feeling"	Will Mackenzie	Jeffrey Sachs	March 13, 1988	14.4/21
5	5	"Community Service"	Will Mackenzie	Matt Ember	March 20, 1988	15.4/23
6	6	"Birth Wait"	Will Mackenzie	Andy Borowitz & Janis Hirsch	March 27, 1988	13.7/21
7	7	"What I Did for Love"	Will Mackenzie	Andy Borowitz	April 3, 1988	9.7/17
8	8	"Great Expectations"	Will Mackenzie	Janis Hirsch	April 10, 1988	15.0/23
9	9	"How Now, Dow Jones"	Will Mackenzie	Andy Borowitz	April 17, 1988	13.5/22
10	10	"Life at a Glance"	Will Mackenzie	Andy Borowitz	April 24, 1988	13.7/22
11	11	"The Age of Dinosaurs"	Will Mackenzie	Philip LaZebnik	May 1, 1988	11.7/18
12	12	"Do You Think I'm Sexy?"	Will Mackenzie	Peter Schneider & Ben Cardinale	May 15, 1988	12.0/20
13	13	"The Field Trip"	Will Mackenzie	Janis Hirsch	May 29, 1988	7.7/17

=== Season 2 (1988–89) ===
No. overall	No. in season	Title	Directed by	Written by	Original release date	U.S. viewers (millions)	Rating/share (households)
14	1	"My World and Welcome to It"	Sam Weisman	Janis Hirsch	October 30, 1988	22.7	14.4/21
15	2	"Won't You Be My Neighbor"	Matthew Diamond	Philip LaZebnik	November 6, 1988	18.8	12.1/17
16	3	"Trading Places"	Matthew Diamond	Janis Hirsch	November 27, 1988	21.9	13.6/19
17	4	"Girl Wars"	Asaad Kelada	Bruce Rasmussen	December 4, 1988	26.7	16.3/24
18	5	"Harper and Son"	Matthew Diamond	Matt Ember	December 11, 1988	22.5	13.7/21
19	6	"Merry Kristin"	Matthew Diamond	Susan Borowitz & Katie Ford	December 18, 1988	17.5	11.8/18
20	7	"You Gotta Be a Football Hero"	Matthew Diamond	Ben Cardinale	January 1, 1989	18.8	11.0/17
21	8	"Smart Women, Nice Refreshments"	Sam Weisman	Bruce Rasmussen	January 8, 1989	22.8	14.0/20
22	9	"Out for a Stretch"	Matthew Diamond	Andy Borowitz	January 15, 1989	16.8	10.4/15
23	10	"The Music Man"	Matthew Diamond	Susan Strauss	January 29, 1989	21.6	13.1/19
24	11	"A Very Brady Episode"	Asaad Kelada	Andy Borowitz	February 5, 1989	24.6	14.5/20
With Ross's grades falling off by him watching too much TV (especially with The Brady Bunch), Ross wishes that he lived with the Bradys. He dreams of living with the Bradys as their son Chuck, which he adapts to, but later starts to not like it. Florence Henderson, Robert Reed, Maureen McCormick, Christopher Knight, Mike Lookinland and Ann B. Davis reunite as matriarch Carol, patriarch Mike, Marcia, Peter, Bobby and housekeeper Alice, respectively
25	12	"My Momma Done Tol' Me"	Matthew Diamond	Philip LaZebnik	February 12, 1989	19.1	11.8/17
26	13	"Fraternity"	Matthew Diamond	Matt Ember	February 19, 1989	18.6	11.5/17
27	14	"Tears of a Clown"	Art Dielhenn	Bruce Rasmussen	February 26, 1989	18.3	11.5/17
28	15	"Harmless Helper"	Carol Scott	Philip LaZebnik & Bruce Rasmussen	March 5, 1989	26.4	16.0/24
29	16	"Three Men and a Babe"	Matthew Diamond	Philip LaZebnik	March 12, 1989	18.1	11.4/17
30	17	"Foul Play"	Matthew Diamond	Jodi Lampert	March 23, 1989	29.8	20.0/33
31	18	"The Reunion"	Will Mackenzie	Andy Borowitz	April 2, 1989	18.4	11.6/18
32	19	"The Lost Weekend"	Carol Scott	Story by : Matt Ember; Teleplay by : Bruce Rasmussen & Philip LaZebnik	April 16, 1989	15.7	9.9/16
33	20	"Father Knows Best"	Tony Mordente	Lloyd Garver	June 4, 1989	12.4	8.7/16

== Syndication ==
After the show's initial run, reruns were shown on the Lifetime Television network and TV Land for several years.

== Home media ==
One episode of the series has been released to DVD in the November 5, 2013, "Family Ties: The Complete Series" DVD boxset release. The episode included is "Trading Places", which featured a crossover between Family Ties and Day by Day, wherein Steven Keaton dropped Andy off for daycare with the Harpers.
