= Hazell (TV series) =

1978 British TV detective series

- Genre: Drama
- Starring: Nicholas Ball; Roddy McMillan; Desmond McNamara; Peter Bourke
- Country of origin: United Kingdom
- Original language: English
- No. of series: 2
- No. of episodes: 22

Production
- Running time: 60 minutes
- Production company: Thames Television

Original release
- Network: ITV
- Release: 16 January 1978 – 5 July 1979

Hazell is a British television series that ran from 1978 to 1979, about a fictional private detective named James Hazell.

== Overview ==
James Hazell was a Cockney private detective character created by journalist and novelist Gordon Williams and footballer Terry Venables, who wrote under the joint pseudonym of P.B.Yuill. The first book, Hazell Plays Solomon, appeared in 1974.

"Hazell Plays Solomon" was also the first episode of the TV series. The wise-cracking private detective was played by Nicholas Ball. Hazell was a smart parody of earlier film-noir detectives such as Philip Marlowe or Sam Spade, the casting of Ball in the title role made for a younger TV Hazell than the Hazell in the books.

A Thames Television Network Production, Hazell ran for 22 one-hour-long episodes (50 minutes without adverts). Its theme music was composed by Andy Mackay; the end credits incorporated the theme music with added lyrics, written by Judy Forrest and sung by Maggie Bell. An academic work, Hazell: The Making of a TV Series by Manuel Alvarado and Edward Buscombe (BFI Publishing) appeared in March 1978.

== Cast ==
The main and most frequent cast members were:

- Nicholas Ball as James 'Jim' Hazell
- Roddy McMillan as Detective Inspector 'Choc' Minty
- Desmond McNamara as Cousin Tel
- Peter Bourke as Graham Morris
- Barbara Young as Dot Wilmington (Series 1 only)
- Maggie Riley as Maureen (Series 1 only)

== Episodes (by series) ==
- Series 1
  - 1. "Hazell Plays Solomon" (16 January 1978)
  - 2. "Hazell Pays a Debt" (23 January 1978)
  - 3. "Hazell and the Walking Blur" (30 January 1978)
  - 4. "Hazell Settles the Accounts" (6 February 1978)
  - 5. "Hazell Meets the First Eleven" (13 February 1978)
  - 6. "Hazell and the Rubber-Heel Brigade" (20 February 1978)
  - 7. "Hazell Goes to the Dogs" (27 February 1978)
  - 8. "Hazell and the Weekend Man" (6 March 1978)
  - 9. "Hazell Works for Nothing" (13 March 1978)
  - 10. "Hazell and the Maltese Vulture" (20 March 1978)
- Series 2
  - 1. "Hazell and the Baker Street Sleuth" (19 April 1979)
  - 2. "Hazell and the Deptford Virgin" (26 April 1979)
  - 3. "Hazell Bangs the Drum" (3 May 1979)
  - 4. "Hazell Gets the Boot" (10 May 1979)
  - 5. "Hazell Gets the Bird" (17 May 1979)
  - 6. "Hazell and the Big Sleep" (24 May 1979)
  - 7.(*) "Hazell and the Suffolk Ghost" (31 May 1979)
  - 8. "Hazell and Hyde" (7 June 1979)
  - 9. "Hazell and the Happy Couple" (14 June 1979)
  - 10. "Hazell Gets the Part" (21 June 1979)
  - 11. "Hazell and the Greasy Gunners" (28 June 1979)
  - 12.(*) "Hazell and the Public Enemy" (5 July 1979)

(*) = Although broadcast as listed, continuity involving the destruction of Hazell's original Triumph Stag car and its replacement with a Jaguar Mark 2, indicates that episode 7 should have been twelfth, and episode 12 should have been ninth (after "Hazell and the Happy Couple", when the Stag is attacked by an angry client).
