= Juliet Sorci =

American child actress

- Other names: Juliet Sloan, Juliet Sorci-Duncan
- Occupation: Actress
- Years active: 1986–1993; 2005–2012-Present
- Spouse: Ian Duncan (m. 2011)
- Children: 1
- Website: JulietSorci.com

Juliet Sorci is an American actress best known for her numerous roles as a child actress.

== Career ==
Sorci studied with many acting teachers which include Howard Fine, Lesly Kahn, and Stan Kirsch; she also studied the Alexander Technique with Jean-Louis Rodrigue and Kristof Konrad and voice control with Robert Corff. Starting out in Hollywood as a child actress, Sorci has appeared in guest roles on numerous TV shows, which include Quantum Leap, The Tracey Ullman Show, Baywatch, In The Heat of the Night (1993). After a 12 year pause, she returned in her first adult role, in a 2005 episode of Zoey 101.

== Personal life ==
As of June 2012, Sorci lived in Los Angeles with her husband Ian Duncan (whom she married in 2011) and their daughter, Cosette.

== Filmography ==
Film and television
Year	Title	Role	Notes
1986	Little Spies	Crying Girl	TV film (The Disney Sunday Movie)
1987	The New Mike Hammer	Amy	Episode: "Kill John Doe"
1987	The Twilight Zone	Little Girl	Episode: "Private Channel"
1988	Night Court	Laura	Episode: "The Night Court Before Christmas"
1989	The Tracey Ullman Show	Missy	Episode: "3.7"
1989	Communion	Second Grade Girl	
1989	A Deadly Silence	JoAnn Pierson	TV film
1989	How I Got into College	Kiddie Koral Girl #2	
1989	Taken Away	Abby Monroe	TV film
1990	Dear John	Melissa	Episode: "Breaking Up Is Hard to Do"
1990	Quantum Leap	Jennifer Farrington	Episode: "Sea Bride"
1990	Equal Justice	Susan Dabich	Episode: "False Images"
1990	The Ghost Writer	Cindy Strack	TV film
1990	A Mom for Christmas	Jessica Slocum	TV film
1991	Never Forget	Edie Mermelstein	TV film
1992	Baywatch	Heather	Episode: "Pier Pressure"
1993	In the Heat of the Night	Heather	Episode: "A Deadly Affection"
2005	Zoey 101	Debra	Episode: "School Dance"
2009	The Hit	Jess	Short film
2009	I Am a Murderer	Woman	Short film
2010	CSI: Miami	Beth	Episode: "Manhunt"
2012	Arden	Juliet	Short film
