= Elliot Greenebaum =

American film director and writer (born 1977)

- Born: United States
- Education: Amherst College; New York University
- Occupation: Filmmaker
- Notable work: Assisted Living
- Awards: Sundance Film Festival; Gen Art Film Festival; Slamdance Film Festival; Woodstock Film Festival; Savannah Film Festival

Elliot Greenebaum (born 1977) is an American film writer and director, best known for his award-winning debut movie, Assisted Living. He also appeared in the role of Chip Wright in the 1990 Disney TV movie A Mom for Christmas.

== Background ==
Elliot Greenebaum was born in Concord MA and raised in Louisville, Kentucky. He graduated from Amherst college in 1999 with a degree in philosophy and received his master's degree in film from NYU in 2005. .

In 2003 he won Slamdance Grand Jury Prize best feature for his indie film Assisted Living which is the fictional story of an unlikely friendship in a nursing home. The film was shot in a working assisted living facility and used residents and staff as actors mixed in with the professional actors. Filmmaker Magazine chose Greenebaum as 50 Filmmakers to Watch and in 2005 he appeared on The Charlie Rose Show.

Between 2014 and 2021 Elliot trained at the Psychoanalytic Association of New York and the Contemporary Freudian Society and became a psychoanalyst in private practice in Brooklyn, New York.

He produces a TikTok and YouTube channel called "Picturing It With Elliot" which features interviews with expert therapists and psychoanalysts.

== Recognition ==
=== Awards and nominations ===
- 2003, Won Slamdance Film Festival Jury Prize for Best Dramatic Feature for Assisted Living
- 2003, Won Gen Art Film Festival Best Picture for Assisted Living
- 2003, Won Gen Art Film Festival Audience Award for Best Feature for Assisted Living
- 2003, Won Slamdance Film Festival Grand Jury Sparky Award for Assisted Living
- 2003, Won Woodstock Film Festival Jury Prize for Assisted Living
- 2003, Won Savannah Film Festival Best Narrative for Assisted Living
