= American Airlines Flight 1420 =

1999 aviation accident in Arkansas

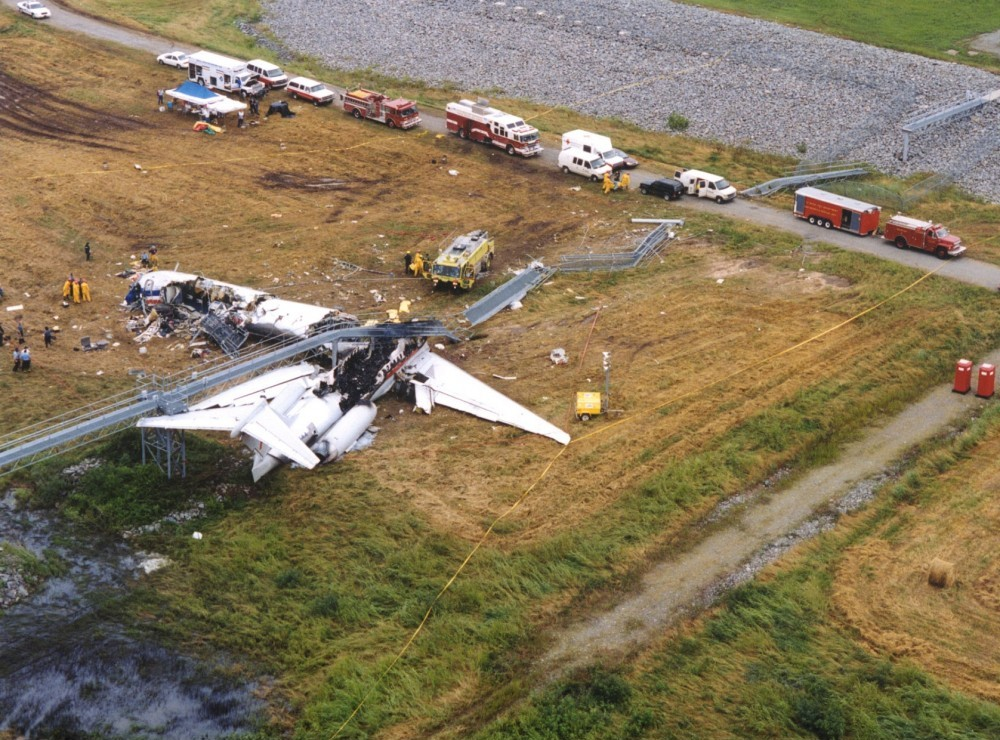
- The aircraft's debris after it overran the runway and crashed

Accident
- Date: June 1, 1999
- Summary: Runway excursion in inclement weather due to pilot error
- Site: Near Little Rock National Airport, Little Rock, Arkansas, United States; 34°44′11″N 92°11′58″W

Aircraft
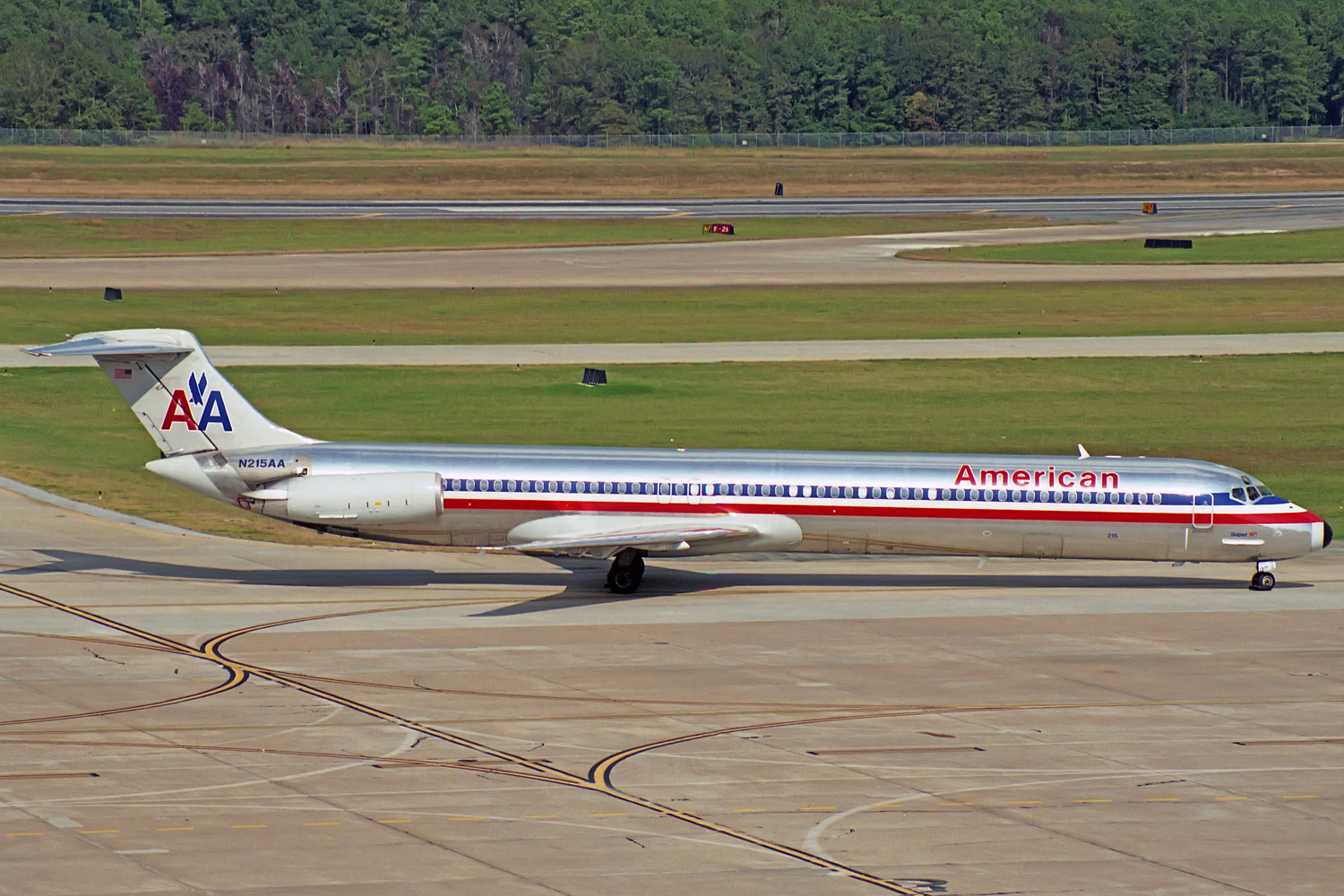
- N215AA, the aircraft involved in the accident, pictured in 1998
- Aircraft type: McDonnell Douglas MD-82
- Operator: American Airlines
- IATA flight No.: AA1420
- ICAO flight No.: AAL1420
- Call sign: American 1420
- Registration: N215AA
- Flight origin: Dallas Fort Worth International Airport, Dallas, Texas, United States
- Destination: Little Rock National Airport, Little Rock, Arkansas, United States
- Occupants: 145
- Passengers: 139
- Crew: 6
- Fatalities: 11 (9 originally, 2 died later)
- Injuries: 110
- Survivors: 134 (136 originally, 2 died afterwards in hospitals)

American Airlines Flight 1420 was a scheduled domestic passenger flight from Dallas Fort Worth International Airport (DFW) to Little Rock National Airport in the United States. On Tuesday, June 1, 1999, the McDonnell Douglas MD-82 operating as Flight 1420 overran the runway upon landing in Little Rock and crashed. Nine of the 145 people aboard were immediately killed—the captain and eight passengers—and 2 more passengers died in the hospital in the following weeks.

== Aircraft ==
Seating chart for American Airlines Flight 1420 created by the NTSB, revealing the location of passengers and lack of injury, severity of injuries, and deaths

The aircraft involved in the incident was a McDonnell Douglas MD-82 (registration N215AA), a derivative of the McDonnell Douglas DC-9, and part of the McDonnell Douglas MD-80 series of aircraft. It was delivered new to American Airlines in 1983, and had been operated continuously by the airline since, accumulating a total of 49,136 flight hours. The aircraft was powered by two Pratt & Whitney JT8D-217C turbofan jet engines.

The aircraft was equipped with X-band weather radar, which is susceptible to attenuation during heavy precipitation, and did not have an attenuation alert to warn the flight crew of system impairment during heavy rainfall. The radar weather system had a forward-looking design that offered the flight crew only a limited field of view in front of the aircraft.

== Flight crew ==
Flight 1420 was commanded by Captain Richard Buschmann, age 48, an experienced pilot with 10,234 flight hours, nearly half of which were accumulated flying the MD-80 series of aircraft. Buschmann graduated from the United States Air Force Academy in 1972, and served in the Air Force until 1979. He held the rank of lieutenant colonel with the US Air Force Reserve Command, and was hired by American Airlines in July 1979. Experienced at flying the Boeing 727 for American, he transitioned to flying the twin-engine MD-80 series in 1991.

The flight's first officer was Michael Origel, age 35. The first officer had been with the airline for less than a year, and had only 182 hours of flight time with American Airlines as an MD-80 pilot. However, the first officer had trained as a pilot with the United States Navy, and had prior commercial flight experience as a corporate pilot, with a total of 4,292 hours of experience at the time of the incident.

Flight 1420 was staffed with four flight attendants, all of whom were qualified on the MD-80, and had recently received refresher training on emergency procedures.

== Flight and weather conditions ==
Simulation of the weather conditions at the time of Flight 1420's landing

Flight 1420 was scheduled to depart DFW at 20:28 (8:28 pm) Central Daylight Time, and then arrive in Little Rock at 21:41 (9:41 pm). The pilots were advised before they boarded that the departure would be delayed, and that the National Weather Service had issued in-flight weather advisories indicating severe thunderstorms along their planned flight path. Adverse weather caused the plane that was intended for Flight 1420 to be delayed in arriving at DFW. Airline policy set a maximum pilot duty time of 14 hours, and Flight 1420 was the flight crew's last flight of the day. The first officer notified the airline's flight dispatcher that the flight crew would, therefore, be unable to depart after 23:16 (11:16 pm). The airline substituted another MD-80, tail number N215AA, which allowed Flight 1420 to depart DFW at 22:40 (10:40 pm).

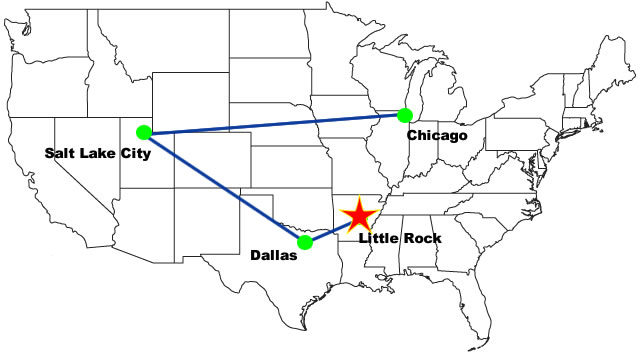
The flight path of Flight 1420

At 23:04 (11:04 pm), air traffic controllers issued a weather advisory indicating severe thunderstorms in an area that included the Little Rock airport, and the flight crew witnessed lightning while on approach. The flight crew discussed the weather reports, but decided to expedite the approach rather than diverting to the designated alternate airport (Nashville International Airport) or returning to DFW.

Air traffic control at Little Rock had originally told Flight 1420 to expect an approach to Runway 22L. At 23:39 (11:39 pm), a controller advised the crew of a wind-shear alert and a change in wind direction. As a result, Captain Buschmann requested a change to Runway 4R, so the flight would have a headwind during landing, and Flight 1420 was cleared for a visual approach to this runway. Because the plane was already close to the airport, the controller had to direct it away to line it up for a landing on 4R. As a result, Flight 1420 faced away from the airport for several minutes, and due to the plane's weather radar capabilities being limited to a narrow and forward-facing field of view, the flight crew could not see thunderstorms approaching the airport during their turn. As the aircraft approached, a severe thunderstorm arrived over the airport, and at 23:44 (11:44 pm), the first officer notified the controller that the crew had lost sight of the runway. The controller then cleared the aircraft to land on 4R using an instrument landing system (ILS) approach.

The pilots rushed to land as soon as possible, leading to errors in judgment that included the crew's failure to complete the MD-82's pre-landing checklist before descending. This was a crucial event in the accident chain, as the crew overlooked multiple critical landing systems on the checklist. The flight crew failed to arm the automatic spoiler system, which automatically moves the spoiler control lever, and deploys the spoilers upon landing. The pilots also failed to set the plane's automatic braking system. Furthermore, the pilots failed to set the landing flaps, another item on the before landing checklist, but as the plane descended past 1,000 feet (300 m), the first officer realized the flaps were not set, and the flight crew set the flaps at 40° setting for landing.

At 23:49:32 (11:49:32 pm), the controller issued the last weather report before Flight 1420's landing, and advised that winds at the airport were 330° at 25 knots (29 mph; 13 m/s). The reported winds exceeded the MD-82's 20-knot (23 mph; 10 m/s) crosswind limit for landing in reduced visibility on a wet runway. Despite the excessive crosswind and two wind-shear reports, Captain Buschmann did not abandon the aircraft's approach into Little Rock, deciding to continue the approach to 4R instead.

== Accident ==
Simulation of the moment of Flight 1420's landing

The aircraft touched down on Runway 4R at 23:50:20 (11:50:20 pm). About two seconds after the wheels touched down, First Officer Origel stated, "We're down. We're sliding!" Because the pilots failed to arm the automatic spoiler, the spoilers did not deploy automatically on landing, and neither pilot deployed them manually.

Autospoilers and autobrakes immediately activate their associated systems as soon as the plane touches down, improving the plane's ability to stop within the confines of a wet runway, especially one that is being subjected to strong and gusting winds, although both can be activated manually by the pilots if they choose to do so. Spoilers disrupt the airflow over the wings, prevent them from generating lift, and cause more of the plane's weight to be borne by the landing gear. About 65% of Flight 1420's weight would have been supported by the plane's landing gear if the spoilers had been deployed, but without the spoilers, this number dropped to only 15%, meaning that AA 1420 had no chance to stop on the runway.

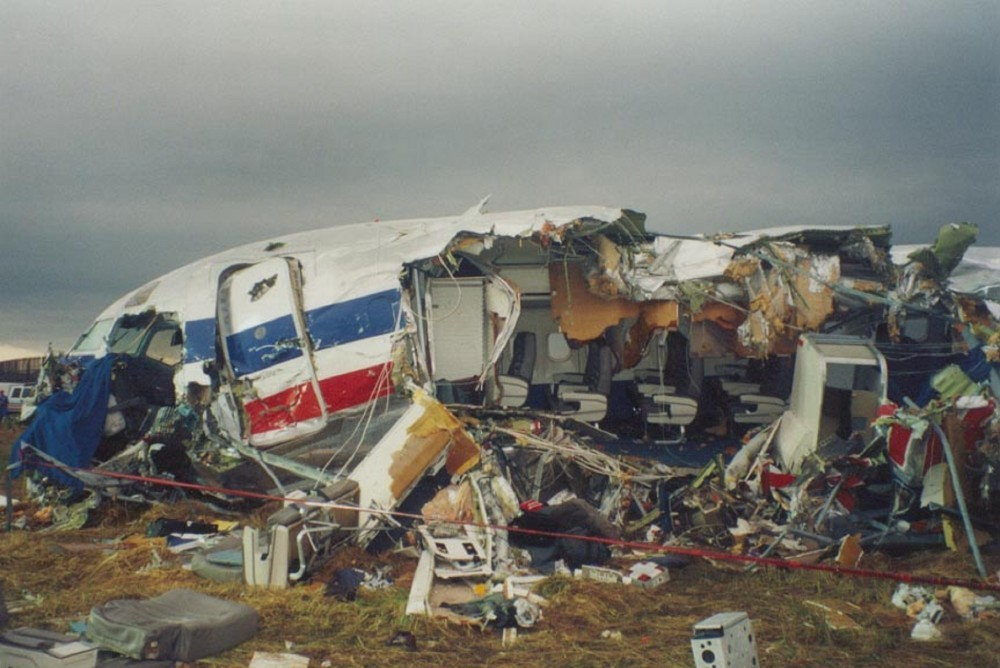
Closeup of the cockpit and forward cabin

With the light loading of the landing gear, the aircraft's brakes were ineffective at slowing down the plane, which continued down the runway at high speed. Directional control was lost when Captain Buschmann applied too much reverse thrust, which reduced the effectiveness of the plane's rudder and vertical stabilizer.

The aircraft continued past the end of the runway, overrunning and traveling another 800 feet (240 m; 270 yd), before striking a security fence and an ILS localizer array. The aircraft then collided with a structure built to support the approach lights for Runway 22L, which extended out into the Arkansas River.

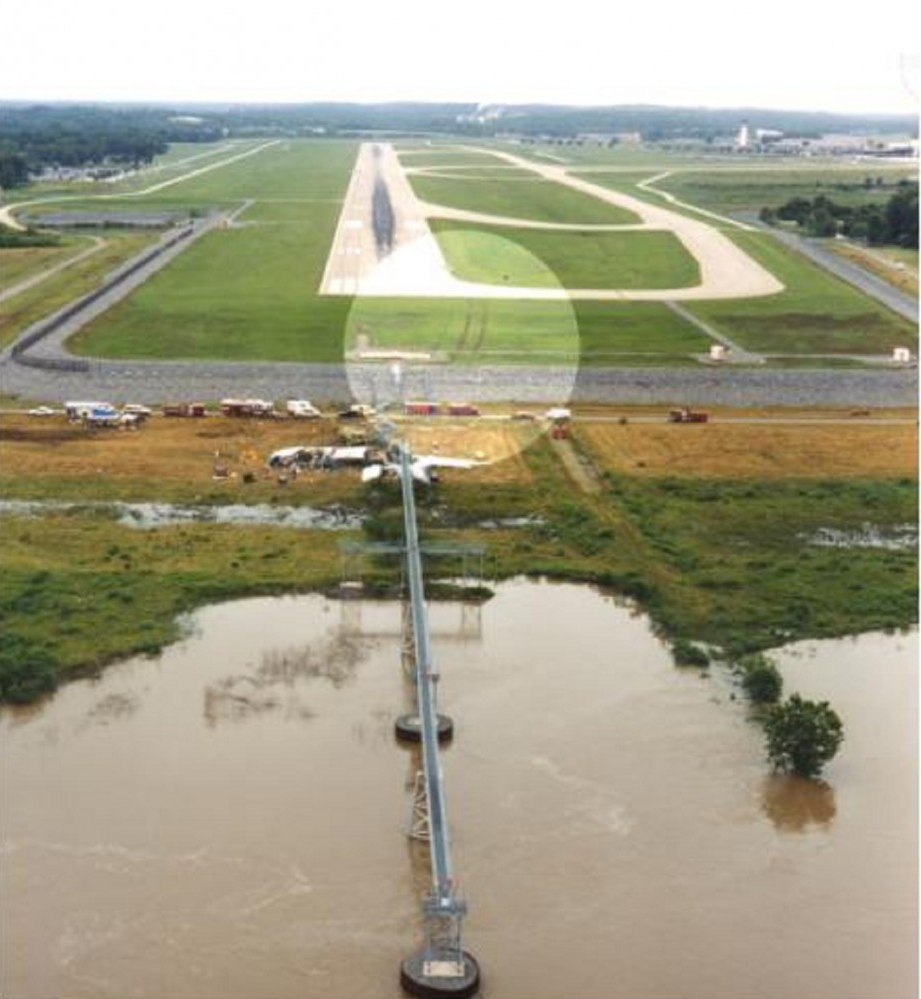
The aftermath of Flight 1420's crash.

Such structures are usually frangible, designed to shear off on impact, but because the approach lights were located on the unstable riverbank, they were firmly anchored. The collision with the sturdy structure crushed the airplane's nose, and destroyed the left side of the plane's fuselage from the cockpit back to the first two rows of coach seating, killing Captain Buschmann instantly. The impact broke the aircraft apart into large sections, which came to rest short of the riverbank.

Captain Buschmann and eight of the plane's 139 passengers were immediately killed in the crash. Another two passengers died in the hospital in the weeks that followed. First Officer Origel, three of the four flight attendants, and 41 passengers sustained serious injuries, the remaining flight attendant and 64 passengers sustained minor injuries, and 24 passengers sustained no injuries.

== Investigation ==
The National Transportation Safety Board (NTSB) investigated the crash.

=== Automatic spoiler and brake systems ===
The NTSB conducted extensive testing to determine whether the automatic spoiler and brake systems had been armed by the pilots before landing.

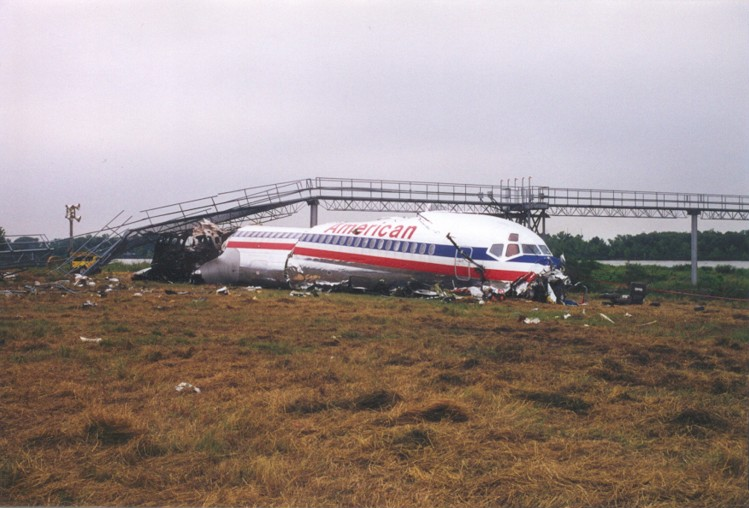
The front view of the wreckage

The plane's cockpit voice recorder (CVR) was reviewed, and no sounds consistent with the spoiler arming or automatically deploying were recorded by the CVR. The NTSB conducted two test flights of American Airlines MD-80 aircraft, which confirmed that manually arming the spoiler created an audible "click" noise—distinguishable from noises made by automatic deployment of the system—that could be clearly heard on CVR playback. The NTSB also conducted ground tests on similar aircraft, including another American Airlines MD-80, for which the autospoiler system failed to deploy during a runway overrun event in Palm Springs, California, but did not result in destruction of the aircraft.

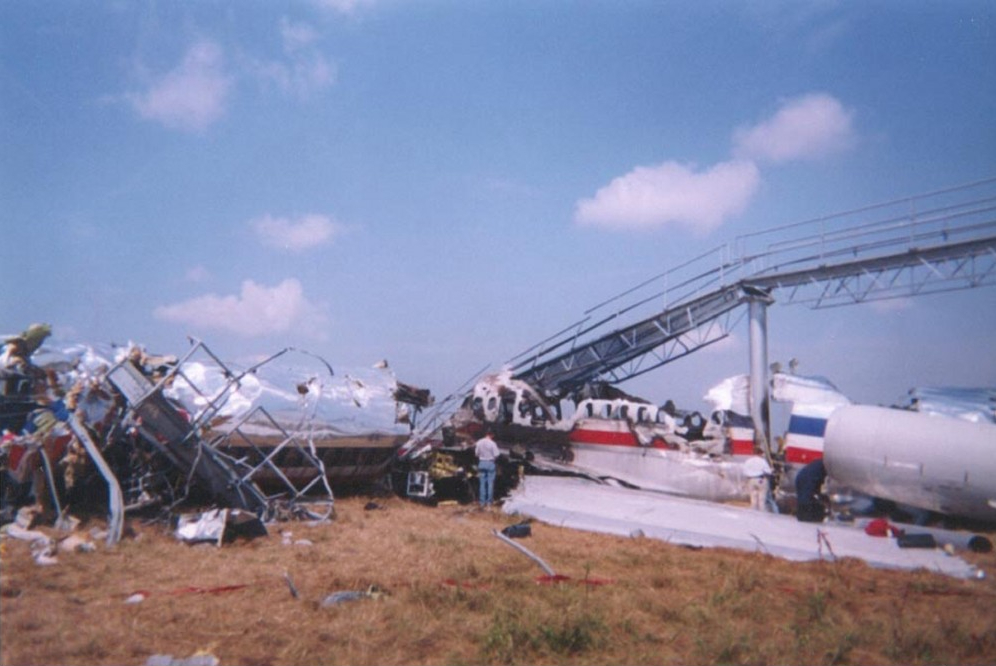
Another view of the wreckage

After Flight 1420 and the Palm Springs incident, American Airlines revised its checklist so pilots would confirm that the spoilers are armed for autodeployment before landing, confirm spoiler deployment, and deploy spoilers manually if they had failed to automatically deploy.

=== Pilot behavior regarding thunderstorms ===
The NTSB investigation also focused on pilot behavior in inclement weather, to determine the impact the storms may have had on the pilots' decision-making process while approaching Little Rock National Airport.

Experts from the Massachusetts Institute of Technology performed a study that recorded the behavior of pilots landing at Dallas/Fort Worth Airport, which aimed to see whether pilots were willing to land in thunderstorms. From a total of 1,952 thunderstorm encounters, 1,310 pilots (67%) flew into thunderstorms during landing attempts. The study found that pilots exhibited more recklessness if they fell behind schedule, if they were attempting to land at night, and if aircraft in front of them successfully landed in similar weather. In a later interview, Greg Feith, the lead NTSB investigator, said he was surprised to learn that pilots exhibited this behavior. Feith added that the pilots may have exhibited "get there-itis", more formally known as "task completion bias" (TCB), as the pilots knew that they were approaching their 14-hour duty limits.

=== Fatigue ===
The NTSB report cited fatigue as a contributing factor. The captain had been awake for 16 hours that day; research indicates that after being awake for 13 hours, pilots make considerably more mistakes. The time of the crash occurred several hours after both pilots' usual bedtime. The first officer reported feeling tired that night, and a yawn was heard on the CVR. The report stated that sleep-deprived people are likely to try the same method of problem solving repeatedly without regard to alternatives.

=== Cause ===
On October 23, 2001, the NTSB issued its determination on the cause of the accident:

The National Transportation Safety Board determines that the probable causes of this accident were the flight crew's failure to discontinue the approach when severe thunderstorms and their associated hazards to flight operations had moved into the airport area, and the crew's failure to ensure that the spoilers had extended after touchdown.

Contributing to the accident were the flight crew's (1) impaired performance resulting from fatigue, and the situational stress associated with the intent to land under the circumstances; (2) continuation of the approach to a landing when the company's maximum crosswind component was exceeded; and (3) use of reverse thrust greater than 1.3 engine pressure ratio after landing.

== Legal issues ==
Multiple lawsuits were filed after the crash, and on December 15, 1999, the Judicial Panel on Multidistrict Litigation consolidated the various federal lawsuits for consolidated and coordinated pretrial proceedings, and assigned the case to United States District Court Senior Judge Henry Woods of the Eastern District of Arkansas. In the lawsuits, the passengers sought compensatory and punitive damages from American Airlines.

Judge Woods separated the passenger cases into those involving domestic and international passengers, because different laws governed the rights of the claimants in each category. For example, passengers traveling on international tickets were prohibited by an international treaty (the Warsaw Convention) from recovering punitive damages. Therefore, Judge Woods ruled that only the domestic passengers would be permitted to pursue punitive damages claims.

The compensatory damages claims proceeded first. American Airlines "admitted liability for the crash, and individual trials were scheduled to assess the proper amount of compensatory damages. Thereafter, American Airlines reached settlement agreements with a majority of the domestic Plaintiffs."

As part of the settlement agreement, "Plaintiffs relinquished not only their compensatory damages claims, but their punitive damages claims, as well." The case proceeded as "three compensatory damages trials involving domestic Plaintiffs [that] were ultimately tried to a jury, and awards of $5.7 million, $3.4 million, and $4.2 million were made." These three Plaintiffs pursued, but ultimately lost their claims for punitive damages. The District Court granted summary judgment in American Airlines' favor on punitive damages, finding under Arkansas law that there was insufficient evidence to submit the issue to a jury to decide. This ruling was later upheld on appeal.

In the only liability trial arising out of the crash of Flight 1420, a federal jury in Little Rock awarded Captain Buschmann's family $2 million in wrongful-death damages following a lawsuit they had filed against Little Rock National Airport. The jury decided Buschmann's death occurred because the aircraft collided with illegal nonfrangible approach-light supports erected in what should have been the runway safety area. The airport was found to have failed to comply with airport safety standards. Buschmann's estate presented evidence that the spoilers were deployed and had malfunctioned (not through the captain's fault), and that the aircraft did not encounter turbulence. The jury rejected the airport's argument that Buschmann was at fault in causing his own death.

The jury verdict has been claimed to completely absolve Buschmann of all fault for the crash, but the NTSB has not changed its probable-cause ruling; American Airlines also admitted liability for the crash, and had "paid many millions of dollars in damages to the passengers and their families." About 10 years following the crash, David E. Rapoport, an attorney who was a member of the court-appointed Plaintiffs' Steering Committee, surmised, "after all these years, [whether Captain Buschmann was "absolved" of all responsibility for the crash] is still a matter reasonable people who are fully informed may disagree on." Rapoport concluded that there should be a consensus understanding among all parties involved that "flight operations should not be conducted in the terminal area when thunderstorms are on the flight path, and nonfrangible objects should not be placed where it is foreseeable an aircraft may go."

== Aftermath ==
A 2004 memorial ceremony was held adjacent to the airport. A survivor of the crash, Jeana Varnell, attended the ceremony, but was quoted in a newspaper article as saying that she strongly objected to memorializing Captain Buschmann.

American Airlines still flies to Little Rock from Dallas/Fort Worth, but the aircraft used is usually an Embraer E175. The route is operated by Envoy Air, an entirely owned subsidiary of the American Airlines Group.

Every year from 2000 to 2022, the father of crash victim Debra Taylor-Sattari elaborately decorated the exterior of his home in Vallejo, California, with Christmas lights and decorations in her honor, which gained attention from local and national media.

== In popular culture ==
- The events of Flight 1420 were featured in "Racing the Storm", Season 1 Episode 2 (2003) of the Canadian TV series Mayday (called Air Emergency and Air Disasters in the United States, and Air Crash Investigation in the UK and elsewhere around the world). The dramatization was broadcast in the United States with the title "Fatal Landing". The flight was also included in a Mayday season-eight (2009) Science of Disaster special titled "Cruel Skies", which looked at the role of bad weather in multiple aviation disasters.
- The Weather Channel detailed the story of the flight on an episode of Storm Stories, as did the Biography Channel on the show Flightmares.
