= Barbara Dillon =

American writer

Barbara Dillon is an American author of children's books including The Beast in the Bed, What's Happened to Harry?, Who Needs a Bear? and Mrs. Tooey and the Terrible Toxic Tar. Ms. Dillon is best known for her book A Mom by Magic which was made into the NBC TV movie A Mom for Christmas starring Olivia Newton-John.

Ms. Dillon was born in Montclair, New Jersey and received a BA degree in English from Brown University. She worked for seven years as an editorial assistant for The New Yorker magazine and sold her first story to Woman's Day magazine at the age of 23. She currently resides in Darien, Connecticut.
