= Taken Away =

1989 American television film

- Genre: Drama
- Written by: Robert L. Freedman; Selma Thompson
- Directed by: John Patterson
- Starring: Valerie Bertinelli; Kevin Dunn; Anna Maria Horsford; Juliet Sorci
- Music by: Rob Mounsey
- Country of origin: United States
- Original language: English

Production
- Executive producer: Marlo Thomas
- Producer: Kimberly Myers
- Production location: United States
- Cinematography: Paul Onorato
- Editor: Stanley Warnow
- Running time: 100 min.
- Production companies: Hart, Thomas & Berlin Productions

Original release
- Network: CBS
- Release: November 5, 1989

Taken Away is a 1989 American made-for-television film starring Valerie Bertinelli, Kevin Dunn, Anna Maria Horsford and Juliet Sorci. The film was directed by John Patterson and premiered on CBS on November 5, 1989.

== Synopsis ==
Stephanie Monroe (Valerie Bertinelli) is a single mother raising her eight year old daughter, Abby Monroe (Juliet Sorci). On one night, Stephanie has to go to school and Abby begs her mother to stay at home alone, rather than going to a babysitter's house. When Abby falls down, she gets scared and calls the police, thinking that they will take her to her mother. The police arrives and instead places Abby in protective custody of the court. Stephanie must fight with the state to get her daughter back.

== Cast ==
- Valerie Bertinelli as Stephanie Monroe
- Juliet Sorci as Abby Monroe
- Kevin Dunn as Mr. Lombardi
- Anna Maria Horsford as Marion Pierson
- Matthew Faison as Judge
- Nada Despotovich as Brenda
- Susannah Blinkoff as Fairfax Admissions Worker
- April Ortiz as Intake Worker

== Production ==
Valerie Bertinelli turned down her role for the film several times before accepting it.
