= A Mom for Christmas =

1990 television film directed by George T. Miller

- Genre: Comedy; Family; Fantasy
- Based on: A Mom by Magic by Barbara Dillon
- Written by: Gerald Di Pego
- Directed by: George T. Miller
- Starring: Olivia Newton-John; Juliet Sorci; Doug Sheehan; Doris Roberts
- Music by: John Farrar; Sean Callery
- Country of origin: United States
- Original language: English

Production
- Executive producer: Steve White
- Producer: Barry Bernardi
- Production locations: Cincinnati; Wyoming, Ohio
- Cinematography: Ron Lautore
- Editors: Les Green; Andrew Cohen
- Running time: 96 minutes
- Production company: Walt Disney Television

Original release
- Network: NBC
- Release: December 17, 1990

A Mom for Christmas is a 1990 American made-for-television Christmas fantasy-comedy film starring Olivia Newton-John, Juliet Sorci, Doug Sheehan and Doris Roberts, directed by George T. Miller and produced by Walt Disney Television. The film marked Newton-John's television film debut and her first film appearance in seven years since Two of a Kind (1983). It was written by Gerald Di Pego based on the book A Mom by Magic by Barbara Dillon and originally premiered on NBC on December 17, 1990. Production was centred around the former Shillito's Department Store (later Lazarus/Macy's) in Cincinnati.

== Plot ==
The story revolves around 11-year-old Jessica Slocum (Juliet Sorci), whose mother died when she was three years old. Her father, Jim (Doug Sheehan), is a workaholic with little time for his daughter and hasn't been able to spend time with her since her mother's death 8 years prior and still seems to be mourning her. Just before the Christmas holiday season, Jessica wins a free wish from a wishing well. Her wish for a mother for Christmas is granted by Philomena (Doris Roberts) and Amy Miller (Olivia Newton-John), a department store mannequin, is brought to life to be a mom for Jessica. However, there is a catch and Amy can only be a mother to her until Christmas Eve.

To clear up any confusion for Jim, Amy claims herself to be a nanny from Australia hired to help care for Jessica while he's at work and she is given a spare room on top of the garage. Amy and Jessica get along until they suffer a brief misunderstanding. Jessica briefly wants to take back the wish and sees Amy go lifeless from her bedroom window. Horrified, she runs out in the rain and stairs to Amy's room, frantically knocking on her door. Amy opens up and Jessica is relieved to see her fine as she is ushered in. The next day, Jessica visits Philomena at the department store to see if she could take back the original wish. She wants Amy to stay forever with them because her father has grown fond of her and she can't bear to lose another mother. Philomena wishes she could help alter the wish, but shows Jessica what Amy will be up against if she isn't there to save her and the other mannequins with faces. The store she works at is planning to replace all the mannequins with faceless ones. Philomena tells Jessica there is only one way to avoid this and if she really wants to save Amy, they must act fast and join hands with her.

That isn't the only thing Amy is up against, an inquisitive store detective suspects her of taking a missing Santa mannequin (needed for Jessica's Christmas pageant) from the store and questions her. However, Amy's mannequin friends come to her aid, especially a male mannequin dressed as a driver who warns him to keep his distance from her. Amy and the Santa mannequin both help Jessica overcome her stage fright and put on a convincing performance that wow's the crowd. Jim takes a photograph of Jessica, his first picture of her since her mother died.

Christmas Eve and Philomena is late to perform the ritual needed to save Amy so she has to return to the store. Jessica recruits Jim to help save her and they head to the store. By the time they reach the store, they see Amy having gone back to being a mannequin and Jessica throws herself at her. She begs her father to grab Amy's hand and he reluctantly does. The ritual works and Amy is brought back before them. They head for home and Amy's mannequin friends wishes her the best of luck in her new life, while the store detective is awakened by Philomena using her magic feather duster. The film ends with a Christmas picture of Jim, Amy and Jessica.

== Cast ==
- Olivia Newton-John as Amy Miller
- Juliet Sorci as Jessica Slocum
- Doug Sheehan as Jim Slocum
- Doris Roberts as Philomena
- Carmen Argenziano as Sergeant Morelli
- Brett Harrelson as Kendall
- Elliot Greenebaum as Chip Wright (credited as Elliot Moss Greenbaum)
- Erica Mitchell as Stephanie Clark
- Aubrey Morris as Nicholas
- Jim Piddock as Wilkins
- Gregory Procaccino as Detective Price
- Steve Russell as Mr. Milliman
- Jesse Vincent as Teddy O'Neill
- Paula Dione Ingram as Mrs. Garcia
- William C. Ingram as himself

== DVD release ==
On October 21, 2008, A Mom for Christmas was released on DVD as a Disney Movie Club Exclusive, available only to club members for mail or online ordering.

== See also ==
- List of Christmas films
- Life-Size (2000)
- Mannequin (1987)
