= Crash: The Mystery of Flight 1501 =

1990 American television film by Philip Saville

- DVD cover
- Genre: Drama; Mystery
- Written by: E. Arthur Kean
- Directed by: Philip Saville
- Starring: Cheryl Ladd; Jeffrey DeMunn
- Theme music composer: Mark Snow
- Country of origin: United States
- Original language: English
- No. of episodes: 1

Production
- Producer: Lee Rafner
- Cinematography: Paul Lohmann
- Editor: Edward M. Abroms
- Running time: 90 minutes
- Production companies: Citadel Entertainment; Consolidated Entertainment; Schaefer/Karpf Productions

Original release
- Network: NBC
- Release: November 18, 1990

Crash: The Mystery of Flight 1501, (also released as Aftermath, Aftermath: The Mystery of Flight 1501 and The Mysterious Crash of Flight 1501), is a 1990 American made-for-television drama film directed by Philip Saville. The film stars Cheryl Ladd and Jeffrey DeMunn. Although fictional, Crash: The Mystery of Flight 1501 is usually advertised as being based on true events.

== Plot ==
Diane (Cheryl Ladd) and Greg Halstead (Doug Sheehan) were once happily married, in later years, even deciding to try to have a baby, despite the fact that she had already suffered two miscarriages. She does not become pregnant and becomes estranged from her husband. On his latest ConWest Airlines flight, Greg, a professional pilot, is alerted to a bomb threat. The person carrying the bomb supposedly wants to kill another passenger, Senator Charleston (John Rayburn) a politician with an outspoken opinion on abortion. Unknown to the killer, however, the politician has already left the McDonnell Douglas DC-9 airliner because of an hour-and-a-half delay. Greg decides to make an emergency landing in Dayton, Ohio, but due to severe thunderstorms, the DC-9 crashes, killing almost everyone on board.

The Central Intelligence Agency, Federal Bureau of Investigation, and National Transportation Safety Board jointly investigate scene of the accident. Amid speculation about the cause of the crash, some suspect Greg of refusing to follow orders. The FBI notices that the CIA immediately collected cargo out of the wreckage and labeled it top secret. Diane is devastated when she hears the news, until she finds out that Greg is one of the few survivors. She is contacted by Scott Cody (Jeffrey DeMunn), who works for the Air Line Pilots Association, International union. He tells her that Greg is the prime suspect in the crash investigation and collects information from her, finding out that Greg was on medication.

Stirred up by news reporter Spense Zolman (Jim Metzler), who senses a good story, the investigators find there was no bomb on board, and all the evidence points to Greg. Cody finds out that the CIA was spying on the aircraft with on-board surveillance equipment, interfering with the aircraft's radar. Diane asks if that was the reason why Greg crashed, but Cody explains that it is more complicated. Meanwhile, Greg dies from his injuries. Diane makes an official statement in which she claims her husband was not responsible, but she is not considered a reliable source, as she could lose pension and other benefits.

Diane refuses to accept that her husband will be blamed for the crash and does everything to get the entire truth revealed. With the help of a few experts, she is able to prove that there was a fire in the cargo hold of the aircraft, the fire starting by spontaneous combustion of a piece of cargo, this in turn caused the crash.

== Cast ==
- Cheryl Ladd as Diane Halstead
- Jeffrey DeMunn as Scott Cody
- Frederick Coffin as Wes Goddard
- Peter Jurasik as Bob Stanton
- Jim Metzler as Spence Zolman
- Jeff McCarthy as Chet Harmon
- Moira Walley as Pamela Hayes
- Doug Sheehan as Gregory "Greg" Halstead
- Ray Blunk as Switzer
- Zachery Ty Bryan as Child (uncredited)
- Paula Preston as Dixie
- Gregory Feith as Co-Pilot Pasco (credited as Greg Feith)
- Jamie Horton as Agent Bryce
- Sheila Ivy Traister as Georgia Kimm
- Stephen West as Nickerson
- John Rayburn as Sen. Charleston
- Michael K. Osborn as Dr. Larwin
- Pat Mahoney as Chadwick
- Liz Jury as Emma
- Mike Leopard as Lt. Owens
- Linda Otto as Harriet
- Dutch Shindler as Keeler
- Joe Horváth as Booth
- Ron Pinkard as Hodges

== Production ==
With the working titles, Aftermath: The Mystery of Flight 1501 and The Mysterious Crash of Flight 1501, the television film was mainly a studio-made affair with stock aerial footage. Principal photography began on July 17, 1990 and was finished by August that year. The aircraft depicted in Crash: The Mystery of Flight 1501 is the ubiquitous DC-9 or its look-alike twin McDonnell Douglas MD-80. The aircraft is flown by the fictional ConWest Airlines, flight 1501, on the Baltimore–Kansas City–San Francisco route.

== Historical context ==
In 1996, six years after the release of Crash: The Mystery of Flight 1501, ValuJet Flight 592, a DC-9, as depicted in the film, crashed after dangerous goods illegally loaded into the cargo compartment caused an in-flight fire which brought down the aircraft. The accident was a startlingly similar echo of the events in the film. (Note: Greg Feith, playing the role of Flight 1501’s First Officer Pasco, was, at the time, a senior investigator for the NTSB; He went on to investigate the ValuJet Flight 592 accident.)

== Reception ==
In a later review of Crash: The Mystery of Flight 1501, Sergio Ortega in airodyssey.net, commented: "I like the depiction of the media and their misinterpretation of air disasters. Cheryl Ladd and the other actors are convincing, but the special effects and footage used aren’t." Andy Webb, in his review for The Movie Scene pinpointed the problems with the film: "What this all boils down to is as a whole movie 'Crash: The Mystery of Flight 1501' doesn't work; it is too contrived and now seriously dated. But the various elements of the movie are interesting and it is a case that less would have made 'Crash: The Mystery of Flight 1501' more."
