= Doug Sheehan =

American actor (1949–2024)

- Born: Douglas Stuart Sheehan; April 27, 1949; Santa Monica, California, U.S.
- Died: June 29, 2024 (aged 75); Big Horn, Wyoming, U.S.
- Occupation: Actor
- Years active: 1978–2003
- Spouse: Cate Abert (m. 1981)

Douglas Stuart Sheehan (April 27, 1949 – June 29, 2024) was an American actor who played Ben Gibson throughout four seasons of the prime-time drama Knots Landing from 1983 to 1987. His character was the second husband of Valene Ewing (Joan Van Ark).

== Early Professional Career ==
His first major role was as Joe Kelly on the daytime soap opera General Hospital from 1979 to 1982. He was nominated for the Daytime Emmy Award for Outstanding Supporting Actor in a Drama Series for the role in 1982.

He also played one of the leads in Day by Day as well as Mel Horowitz on Clueless from 1997 to 1999 replacing Michael Lerner. He also appeared on Sabrina the Teenage Witch as Sabrina's father.

== Personal life ==
In 1984, Knots Landing co-star William Devane persuaded Sheehan to take up polo as a hobby. Doug's wife Cate Abert, a professional photographer, would be seen taking photos of him playing polo. Doug is a founding member of The San Diego Polo Club.

In 2005, Sheehan's ranch in Julian, California, was destroyed by a wildfire.

Sheehan died at his home in Big Horn, Wyoming, on June 29, 2024, at the age of 75.

== Filmography ==
=== Film ===
Year	Title	Role	Notes
1979	10	Police Officer	
1982	Victor/Victoria	Dancer/Matador	
1995	Cops n Roberts	Bert Rogers	

=== Television ===
Year	Title	Role	Notes
1978	Charlie's Angels	Ben Anderson	Episode: "Angels Ahoy"
1979	Kaz		Episode: "They've Taken Our Daughter"
1979–1982	General Hospital	Joe Kelly	Series regular
1983	Cheers	Walter Franklin	Episode: "Diane's Perfect Date"
1983	Alice	Roger	Episode: "Jolene Lets the Cat Out of the Bag"
1983–1988	Knots Landing	Ben Gibson	115 episodes
1987	Stranger in My Bed	Roger	Television film
1988	In the Line of Duty: The F.B.I. Murders	Agent Gordon McNeill	Television film
1988–1989	Day by Day	Brian Harper	33 episodes
1990	MacGyver	Jack Chandler	Episode: "Log Jam"
1990	Dear John	Jason Fowler	Episode: "That's Big of Me"
1990	Crash: The Mystery of Flight 1501	Greg Halstead	Television film
1990	A Mom for Christmas	Jim Slocum	Television film
1993	Columbo	Riley	Episode: "It's All in the Game"
1997	Promised Land	Rod Bridger	Episode: "The Promise"
1997–1999	Clueless	Mel Horowitz	44 episodes
1998	Style & Substance	Grant	Episode: "Chelsea's Ex"
1999, 2003	Sabrina the Teenage Witch	Edward Spellman	2 episodes
2000	Diagnosis: Murder	Roger Andrews	Episode: "Death by Design"
2002	That Was Then		Episode: "A Rock and a Head Case"
2003	What I Like About You	Craig Miller	Episode: "The Other Woman"
