= Assisted Living (film) =

- Directed by: Elliot Greenebaum
- Written by: Elliot Greenebaum
- Starring: Michael Bonsignore
- Release date: February 2003 (Slamdance)
- Country: United States
- Language: English

Assisted Living is a 2003 American comedy film directed and written by Elliot Greenebaum. It depicts a day in the life of Todd, a janitor at an assisted living facility. He befriends the residents, one of whom confuses him for her son. Assisted Living won 4 awards at film festivals, including the Grand Jury Prize at the 2003 Slamdance Film Festival.
