= Network change =

A network change is when a television series moves from one network to another. Generally this term only refers to original episodes of a series; repeats of a long-running series will usually be picked up by other channels in syndication, often before the series ends production.

Network changes are uncommon occurrences; in most cases, pickup by a network is made conditional on giving that network the first opportunity to order additional seasons. Generally, a network change will only occur if either the original network cancels the series, or the show's producers choose to move to another network for financial reasons. The latter circumstance is rare, partly because the producers would typically have to wait out an exclusive negotiation window with the original network, and—especially in the 21st century—partly because of vertical integration (specifically, major networks ordering most of their series from companies under the same corporate umbrella).

Only 4% of American television shows changed networks between 2000 and 2012, excluding the one-off merger of UPN and The WB to form The CW.
