= Eastern Air Lines Flight 980 =

1985 aviation accident in Bolivia

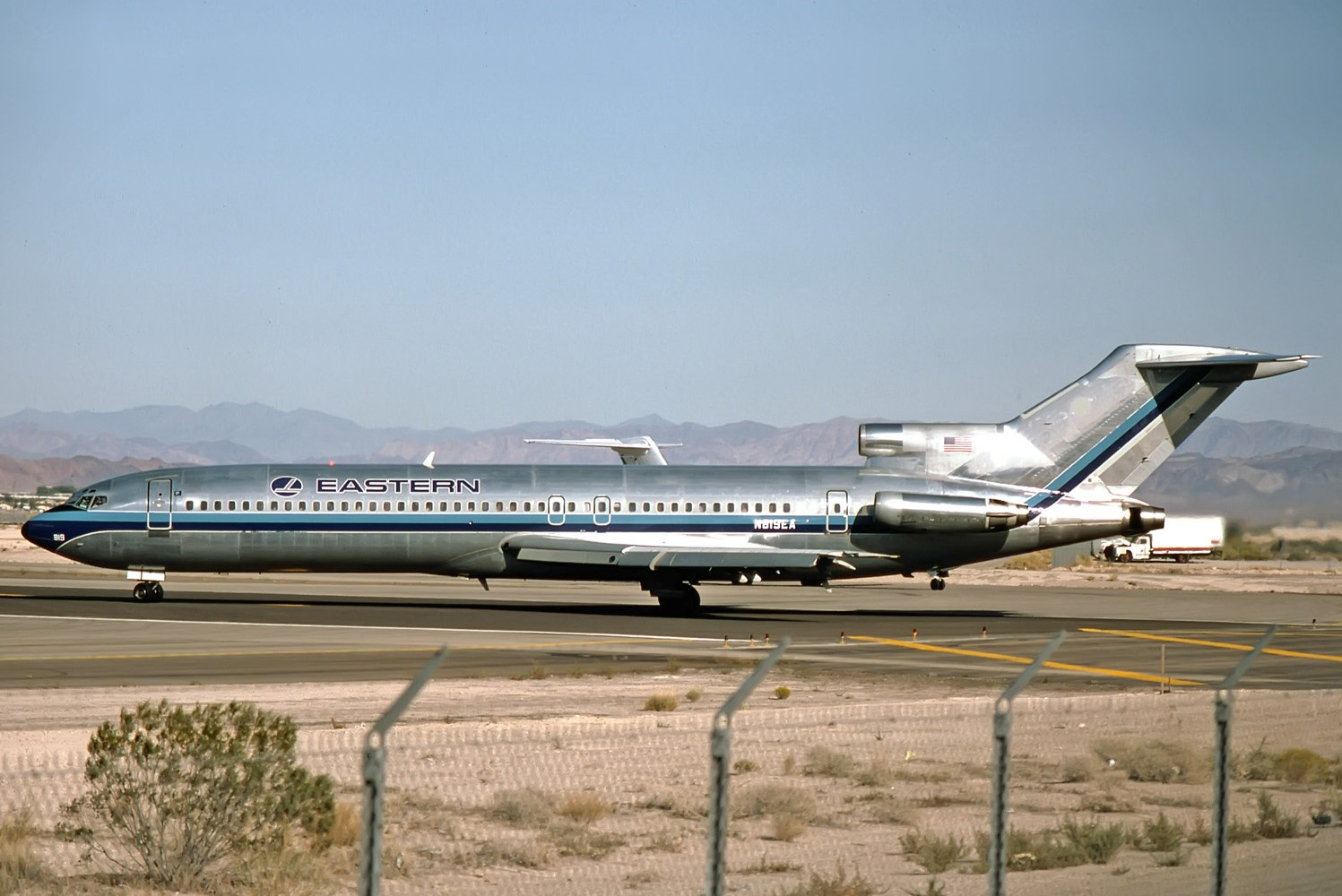
- N819EA, the aircraft involved in the accident, seen in 1982

Accident
- Date: 1 January 1985
- Summary: Controlled flight into terrain for unknown reasons
- Site: Mount Illimani, Bolivia; 16°38′10″S 67°47′21″W

Aircraft
- Aircraft type: Boeing 727-225 Advanced (Note: The aircraft was a Boeing 727-200 Advanced ("Boeing 727-200 Adv") model; Boeing assigns a unique code for each company that buys one of its aircraft, which is applied as an infix to the model number at the time the aircraft is built, hence "727-225" designates a 727-200 built for Eastern Airlines (customer code 25).)
- Operator: Eastern Air Lines
- IATA flight No.: EA980
- ICAO flight No.: EAL980
- Call sign: EASTERN 980
- Registration: N819EA
- Flight origin: President Stroessner International Airport, Asunción, Paraguay
- 1st stopover: El Alto International Airport, La Paz, Bolivia
- Last stopover: Simón Bolívar International Airport, Guayaquil, Ecuador
- Destination: Miami International Airport, Florida, United States
- Occupants: 29
- Passengers: 19
- Crew: 10
- Fatalities: 29
- Survivors: 0

Eastern Air Lines Flight 980 was a scheduled international flight from Asunción, Paraguay, to Miami, Florida, United States. On January 1, 1985, while descending towards La Paz, Bolivia, for a scheduled stopover, the Boeing 727 jetliner struck Mount Illimani at an altitude of 19,600 feet (6,000 m), killing all 29 people on board.

The wreckage was scattered over a large area of a glacier covered with snow. Over the decades, several search expeditions were only able to recover a small amount of debris, and searches for the flight recorders were unsuccessful. The accident remains the highest-altitude controlled flight into terrain in commercial aviation history.

== Accident ==
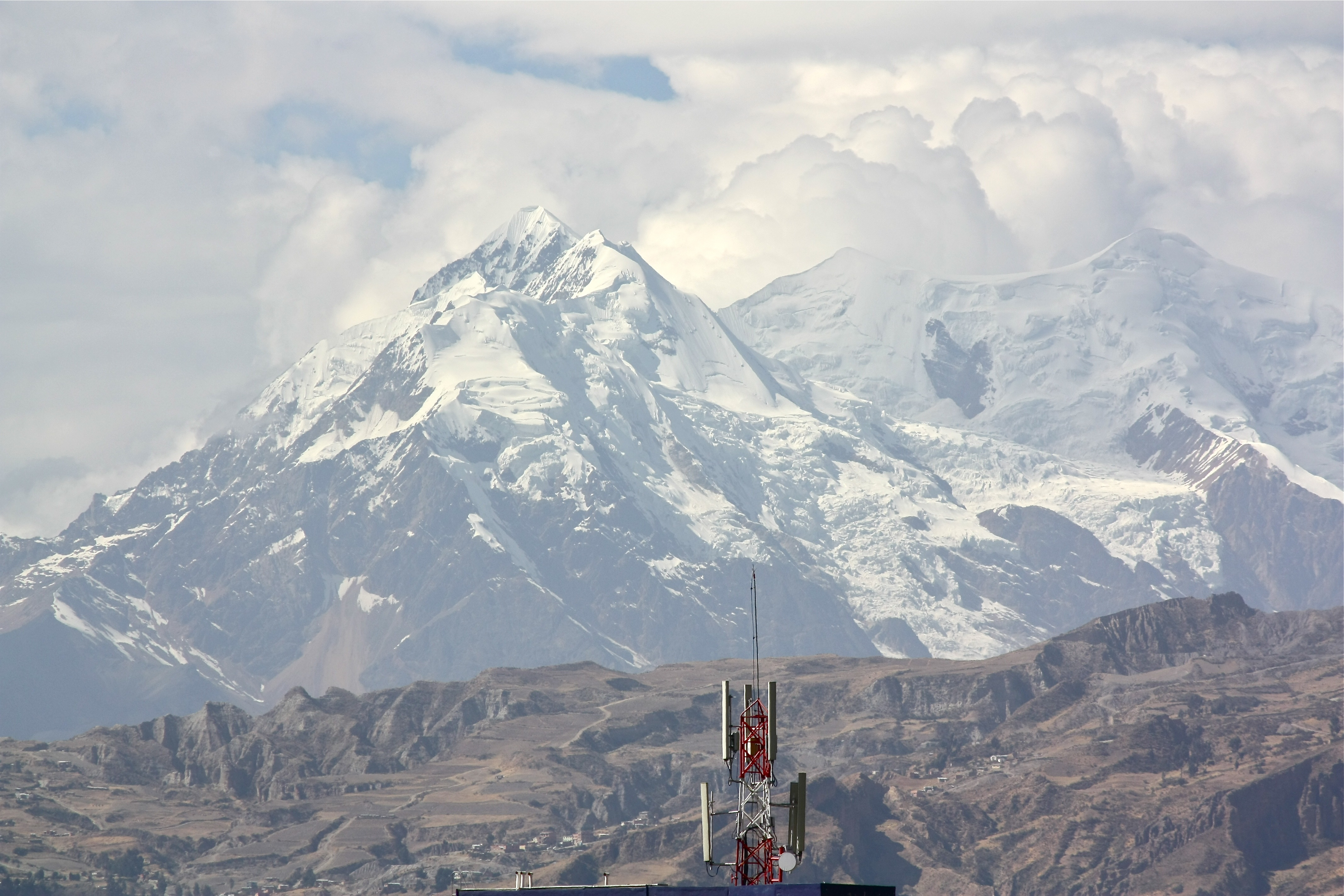
Mount Illimani, the crash site, visible from near El Alto International Airport, where Eastern Air Lines Flight 980 had a scheduled stopover.

Eastern Air Lines Flight 980 had departed President Stroessner International Airport in Asunción, Paraguay, at 17:57 on January 1, 1985, with nineteen passengers and a crew of ten. The passengers were from Paraguay, South Korea and the United States. Among them was the wife of Arthur H. Davis, the then-U.S. Ambassador to Paraguay, William Kelly, a director of the Peace Corps in Paraguay, and two Eastern pilots flying as passengers. The flight crew consisted of Captain Larry Campbell, First Officer Kenneth Rhodes, Flight Engineer Mark Bird, and five flight attendants from Chile.

At 19:37 the flight crew of Flight 980 told air traffic controllers at El Alto International Airport in La Paz, Bolivia, that he estimated landing at 19:47. The crew was cleared to descend from 25,000 to 18,000 feet (7,620 to 5,486 m). At some point after this exchange, the aircraft veered significantly off course for unknown reasons, possibly to avoid weather. The accident occurred 25 miles (22 nmi; 40 km) from runway 9R at El Alto airport.

== On-site investigation ==
In October 1985, the U.S. National Transportation Safety Board (NTSB) selected Greg Feith, an air safety investigator, to lead a team of U.S. investigators and Bolivian mountain guides to conduct an on-site examination of the wreckage of Flight 980, which had come to rest around 20,098 feet (6,126 m). Feith conducted the on-site investigation with the goal of finding the flight data recorder (FDR) and the cockpit voice recorder (CVR), as well as retrieving other critical information; however, because the wreckage was spread over a vast area and covered by 20 to 30 ft (6 to 9 m) of snow, he and his team could not locate either of the "black boxes". He did retrieve various small parts of the aircraft cockpit, official flight-related paperwork, and some items from the passenger cabin.

== Discovery of wreckage ==
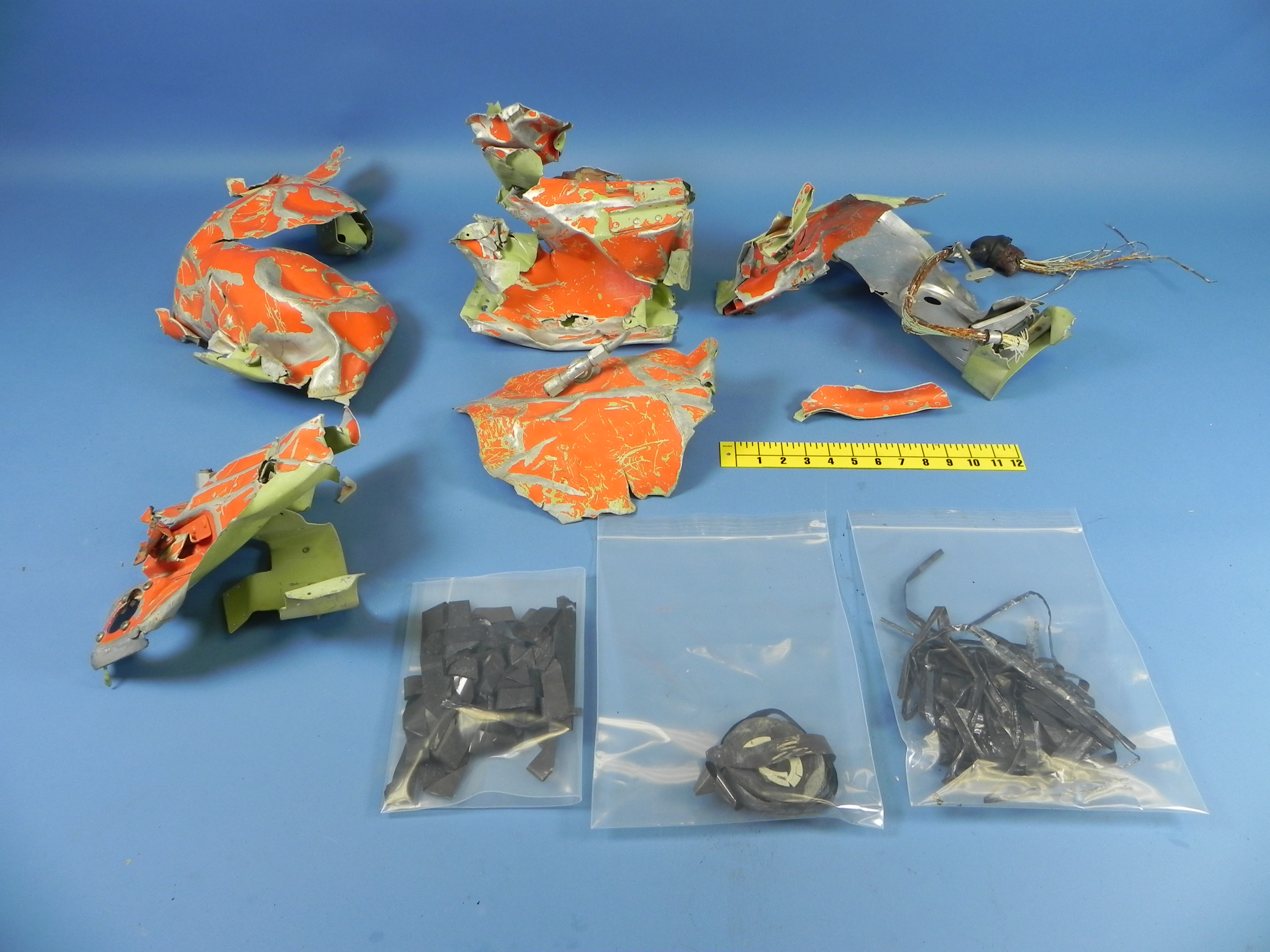
Wreckage of Flight 980

Over the years, the debris moved along with the glacier and eventually emerged enough that climbers were able to uncover wreckage in 2006. No bodies were found, though various personal effects of the passengers were recovered. Local climbers believed it was only a matter of time before bodies, the flight data recorder and cockpit voice recorder emerge from the ice.

On 4 June 2016, after one of the warmest years on record in the area, human remains and a piece of wreckage labelled "CKPT VO RCDR" were recovered by a team of five in the Andes Mountains including Dan Futrell and Isaac Stoner of Operation Thonapa who recovered six large orange metal segments and several damaged pieces of magnetic tape. After review by the NTSB, the pieces turned out to be the housing components of the flight recorders but holding no data themselves, while the tape turned out to be a home recording of an unrelated TV program.

== See also ==
- List of accidents and incidents involving commercial aircraft
- List of unrecovered and unusable flight recorders
