= Sky Ferreira discography =

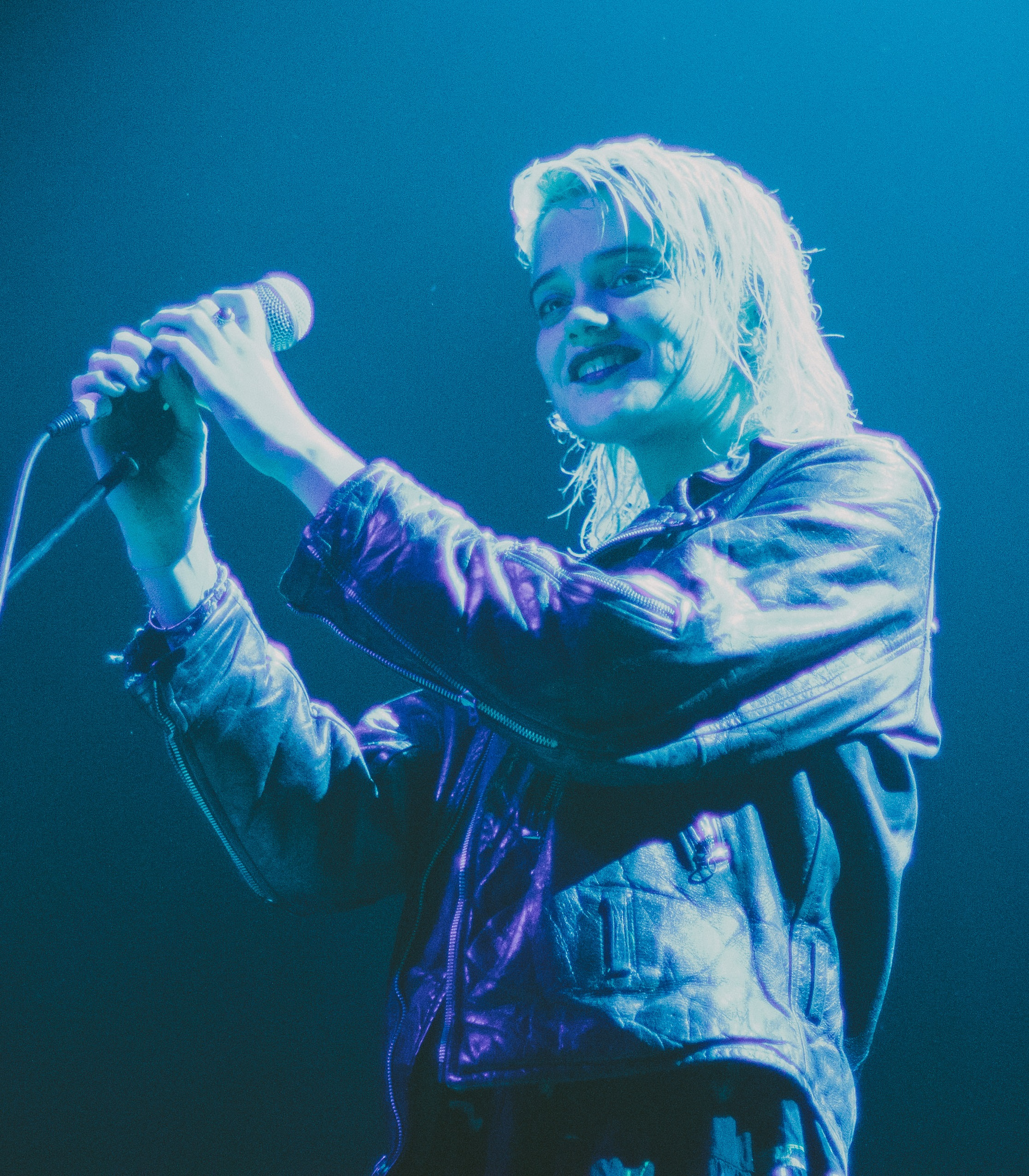
- Ferreira performing in St. Louis, Missouri, on September 24, 2013
- Studio albums: 1
- EPs: 3
- Singles: 10
- Music videos: 15
- Promotional singles: 3

American singer and songwriter Sky Ferreira has released one studio album, three extended plays, 10 singles (including one as a featured artist), three promotional singles (including one as a featured artist), and 15 music videos. She signed a recording contract with Parlophone in 2009 and released the song "One" through the label in 2010. It was written by Ferreira, Bloodshy & Avant, Magnus Lidehäll, Marit Bergman and peaked at number 64 on the UK Singles Chart. It was followed by "Obsession" later that year which was written by Ferreira, Jerrod Bettis, Justin Franks and Ryan Tedder. It reached number 37 on the US Billboard Hot Dance Club Songs chart. During this time, much of her lyrical content incorporated themes of rebellion and teenage romance.

Ferreira released her first extended play, As If! in 2011 for which she co-wrote "Sex Rules" and "99 Tears" with Greg Kurstin, "Haters Anonymous" and "108" with Bloodshy & Avant. Her second extended play, Ghost was released in 2012 by Capitol Records; It substituted the synth-pop styles displayed in her earlier projects and instead showcased more prominent elements of acoustic, new wave, and rock music. Its second single, "Everything Is Embarrassing", was written by Ferreira, Dev Hynes and Ariel Rechtshaid and had sold 19,000 copies in the United States as of March 2014.

Ferreira released her debut studio album, Night Time, My Time in October 2013; It was largely inspired in indie rock musical styles. The record debuted at number 45 on the US Billboard 200, becoming her first entry on the chart. Ariel Rechtshaid and Justin Louis "J.L." Raisen helped co-write each of its 12 tracks. Her third extended play, Night Time, My Time: B-Sides Part 1 was released roughly one month later and featured additional writing contributions from Rechitshaid. That year, she additionally appeared as a featured vocalist on the track "Black" by South Korean recording artist G-Dragon for his second studio album, Coup d'Etat; he co-wrote the song with Teddy Park.

== Studio albums ==
List of studio albums, with selected chart positions
| Title | Details | Peak chart positions | | | |
| Title | Details | US | AUS | SCO | UK |
|---|---|---|---|---|---|
| Night Time, My Time | Released: October 29, 2013; Label: Capitol; Formats: CD, LP, digital download | 45 | 40 | 97 | 73 |
| Masochism | Released: TBA; Formats: TBA | To be released | | | |

== Extended plays ==
List of extended plays, with selected chart positions
| Title | Details | Peak chart positions | |
| Title | Details | US Alt. | US Heat. |
|---|---|---|---|
| As If! | Released: March 22, 2011; Label: Capitol; Format: Digital download | — | — |
| Ghost | Released: October 16, 2012; Label: Capitol; Formats: CD, LP, digital download | 71 | 8 |
| Night Time, My Time: B-Sides Part 1 | Released: November 25, 2013; Label: Capitol; Formats: CD, digital download | — | — |
"—" denotes a recording that did not chart or was not released in that territory.

== Singles ==
=== As lead artist ===
List of singles, with selected chart positions, showing year released and album name
| Title | Year | Peak chart positions | | | | | Album |
| Title | Year | US Dance | BEL (FL) Tip | BEL (WA) Tip | SCO | UK | Album |
|---|---|---|---|---|---|---|---|
| "17" | 2010 | — | — | — | — | — | Non-album singles |
| "One" | 2010 | — | — | — | 60 | 64 | Non-album singles |
| "Obsession" | 2010 | 37 | — | — | — | — | Non-album singles |
| "Sex Rules" | 2011 | — | — | — | — | — | As If! |
| "Red Lips" | 2012 | — | — | — | — | — | Ghost |
| "Everything Is Embarrassing" | 2013 | — | 20 | 46 | — | — | Ghost |
| "You're Not the One" | 2013 | — | — | — | — | — | Night Time, My Time |
| "I Blame Myself" | 2014 | — | — | — | — | — | Night Time, My Time |
| "Downhill Lullaby" | 2019 | — | — | — | — | — | Masochism |
| "Don't Forget" | 2022 | — | — | — | — | — | Masochism |
| "Leash" | 2024 | — | — | — | — | — | Non-album single |
"—" denotes a recording that did not chart or was not released in that territory.

=== As featured artist ===
| Title | Year | Album |
|---|---|---|
| "Where the Light Gets In" (Primal Scream featuring Sky Ferreira) | 2016 | Chaosmosis |

=== Promotional singles ===
| Title | Year | Peak chart positions | Album |
| Title | Year | NZ Hot | Album |
|---|---|---|---|
| "24 Hours" | 2013 | — | Night Time, My Time |
| "Boys" | 2014 | — | Night Time, My Time |
| "Cross You Out" (Charli XCX featuring Sky Ferreira) | 2019 | 36 | Charli |
"—" denotes a recording that did not chart or was not released in that territory.

== Other charted songs ==
| Title | Year | Peak chart positions | Album |
| Title | Year | US World | Album |
|---|---|---|---|
| "Black" (G-Dragon featuring Sky Ferreira) | 2013 | 10 | Coup d'Etat |

== Guest appearances ==
List of non-single guest appearances, with other performing artists, showing year released and album name
| Title | Year | Other artist(s) | Album |
|---|---|---|---|
| "Teen Lovers" (The Shoes remix) | 2009 | The Virgins | "Teen Lovers" (single) |
| "FFA 1985" | 2009 | The Bloody Beetroots | Romborama |
| "Without Lies" | 2010 | Aeroplane | We Can't Fly |
| "Bang Bang" | 2012 | 2Cellos | In2ition |
| "Black" | 2013 | G-Dragon | Coup d'Etat |
| "My Molly 2.0" | 2013 | Ariel Pink | None |
| "Blue Boredom (Sky's Song)" | 2016 | DIIV | Is the Is Are |
| "Blue Velvet" | 2016 | None | The Music of David Lynch: Benefiting the David Lynch Foundation |
| "The Two of Us" "Black and Blues" | 2017 | The Jesus and Mary Chain | Damage and Joy |
| "Easy" | 2017 | None | Baby Driver (Music from the Motion Picture) |
| "Pain Killer" | 2018 | Iceage | Beyondless |
| "1980-99" | 2018 | Ssion | O |
| "Die Waiting" | 2019 | Beck | Hyperspace |
| "The Freezing" | 2019 | Jorge Elbrecht | Gloss Coma - 002 |
| "Eyes of the World" | 2026 | Charli XCX | Wuthering Heights |

== Songwriting credits ==
List of songs written or co-written for other artists, showing year released and album name
| Title | Year | Other artist(s) | Album |
|---|---|---|---|
| "Journey to the Center of the World" | 2011 | Coco Morier | Coco Morier EP |
| "Livin' My Love" | 2012 | Steve Aoki | Wonderland |
| "Ambulance" | 2012 | Coco Morier | Strangers May Kiss |
| "Hallucination" | 2012 | Coco Morier | Strangers May Kiss |

== Music videos ==
List of music videos, showing year released and directors
| Title | Year | Director | Ref. |
|---|---|---|---|
| "17" | 2010 | Cass Bird | |
| "One" | 2010 | Rankin | |
| "Obsession" | 2010 | Marc Klasfeld | |
| "Traces" | 2011 | Rankin | |
| "Red Lips" | 2012 | Terry Richardson | |
| "Everything Is Embarrassing" | 2012 | Grant Singer | |
| "Sad Dream" | 2012 | Grant Singer | |
| "Lost in My Bedroom" | 2013 | Grant Singer | |
| "You're Not the One" | 2013 | Grant Singer | |
| "Night Time, My Time" | 2013 | Grant Singer | |
| "My Molly" (with Ariel Pink) | 2013 | Grant Singer | |
| "I Blame Myself" | 2014 | Grant Singer | |
| "Omanko" | 2014 | Zachary Cole Smith | |
| "Where the Light Gets In" (Primal Scream featuring Sky Ferreira) | 2016 | Douglas Hart | |
| "Easy" | 2017 | Edgar Wright | |

=== Guest appearances ===
List of guest appearances in music videos, showing year released, artist, and directors
| Title | Year | Artist | Director(s) | Ref. |
|---|---|---|---|---|
| "Pop the Glock" | 2009 | Uffie | Nathalie Canguilhem | |
| "Wait" | 2013 | DIIV | Sandy Kim | |
| "Diane Young" | 2013 | Vampire Weekend | Primo Kahn | |
| "LA Drugs" | 2013 | Starred | Focus Creeps and Man Kim Atelier | |
| "Isadora" | 2023 | Thurston Moore | Radieux Radio | |
