= List of songs recorded by Sky Ferreira =

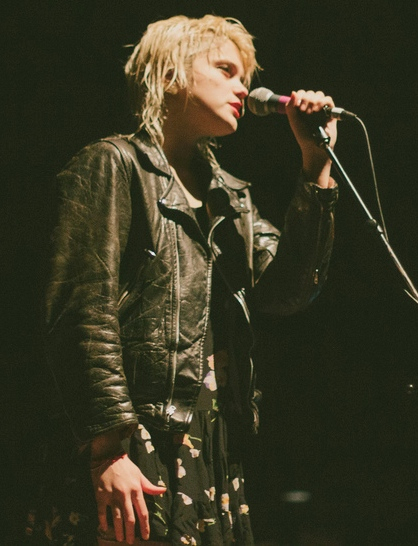
Ferreira performing at The Pageant in St. Louis, Missouri, September 2013

American singer Sky Ferreira has recorded songs for one studio album, three extended plays, and non-album singles. She signed a recording contract with Parlophone in 2009, and released the song "One" through the label in 2010. It was written by Ferreira, Bloodshy & Avant, Magnus Lidehäll, and Marit Bergman, and peaked at number 64 on the UK Singles Chart. It was followed by "Obsession" later that year, which was written by Ferreira, Jerrod Bettis, Justin Franks, and Ryan Tedder. It reached number 37 on the U.S. Billboard Hot Dance Club Songs chart. During this time, much of her lyrical content incorporated themes of rebellion and teenage romance.

Ferreira released her first extended play As If in 2011, for which she co-wrote "Sex Rules" and "99 Tears" with Greg Kurstin and "Haters Anonymous" and "108" with Bloodshy & Avant. Her second extended play Ghost was released in 2012 by Capitol Records; it substituted the synthpop styles displayed in her earlier projects, and instead showcased more prominent elements of acoustic, new wave, and rock music. Its second single "Everything Is Embarrassing" was written by Ferreira, Dev Hynes, and Ariel Rechtshaid, and has sold 19,000 copies in the United States as of March 2014.

Ferreira released her debut studio album Night Time, My Time in 2013; it was largely inspired in indie rock musical styles. The record debuted at number 45 on the U.S. Billboard 200, becoming her first entry on the chart. Ariel Rechtshaid and Justin Louis "J.L." Raisen helped to co-write each of its twelve tracks. Her third extended play Night Time, My Time: B-Sides Part 1 was released roughly one month later, and featured additional writing contributions from Rechitshaid. That year, she additionally appeared as a featured vocalist on the track "Black" by South Korean recording artist G-Dragon for his second studio album Coup d'Etat; he co-wrote the song with Teddy Park.

== Recorded songs ==
Key
†	Indicates single release

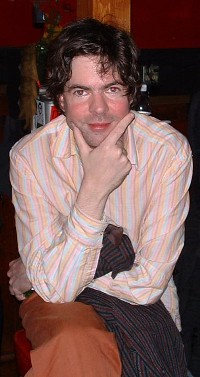
Jon Brion (pictured) co-wrote "Ghost" and "I'm on Top" for Ghost and Night Time, My Time: B-Sides Part 1, respectively.

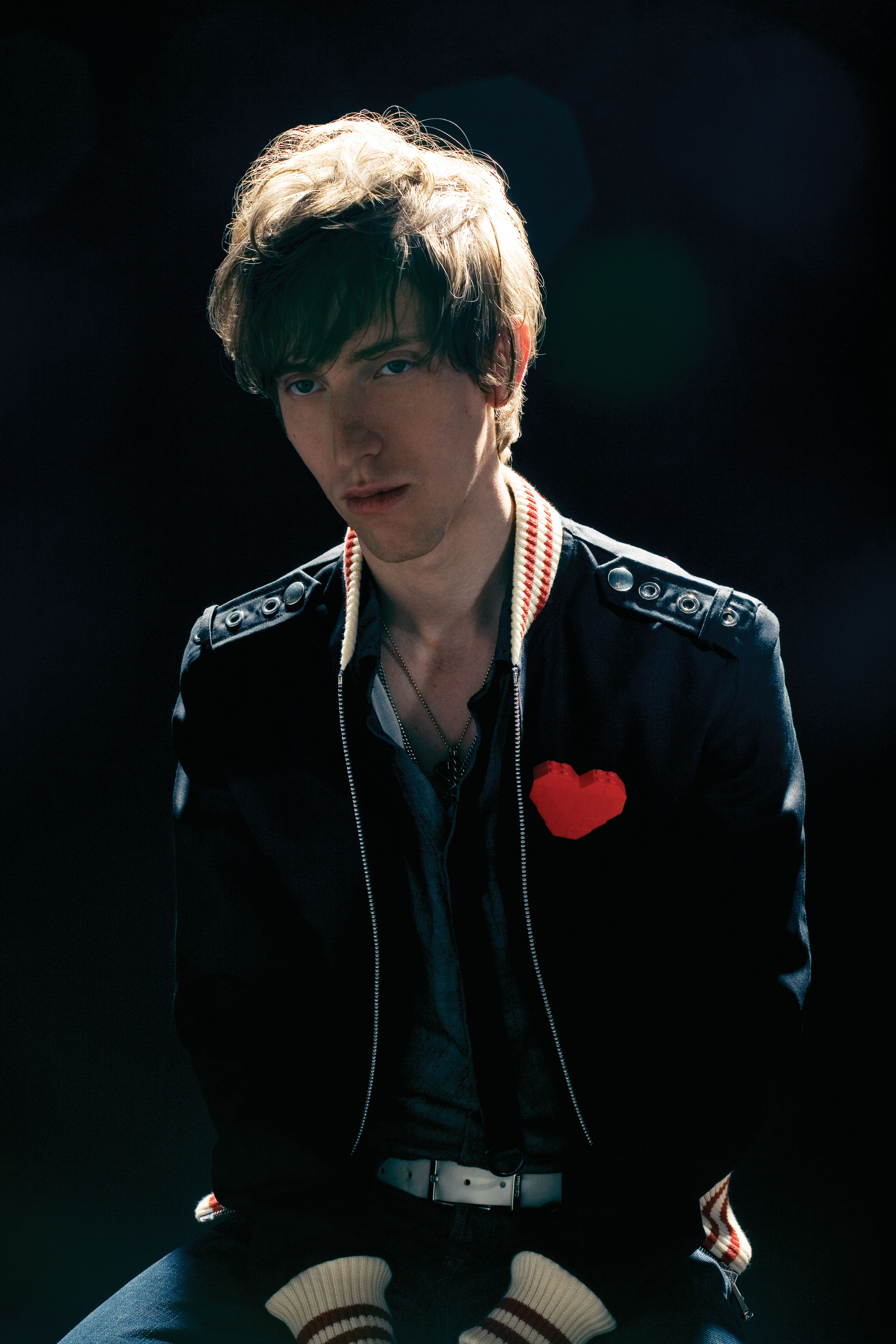
Colin Munroe (pictured) co-wrote "Traces" for As If!.

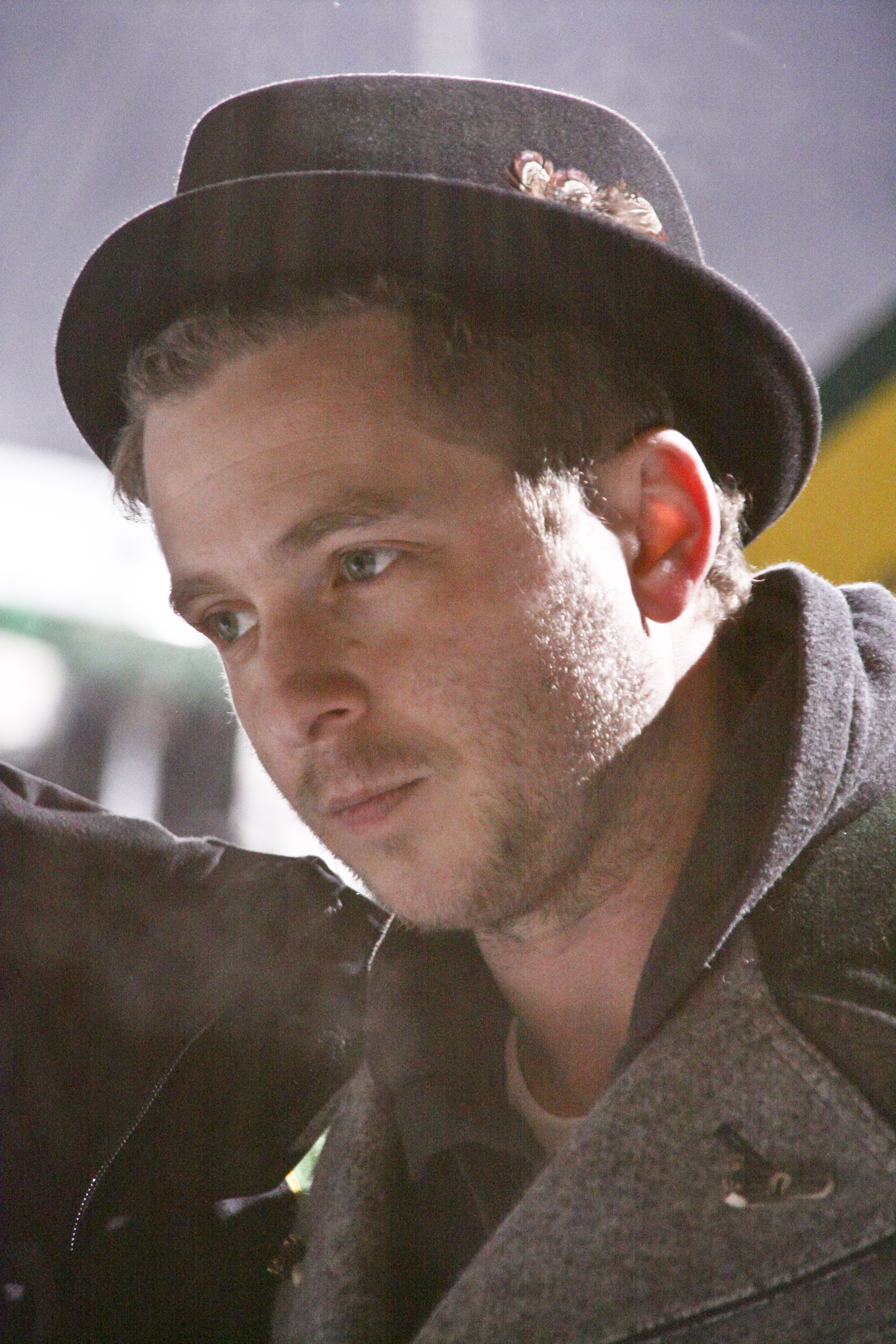
Ryan Tedder (pictured) co-wrote the non-album single "Obsession".

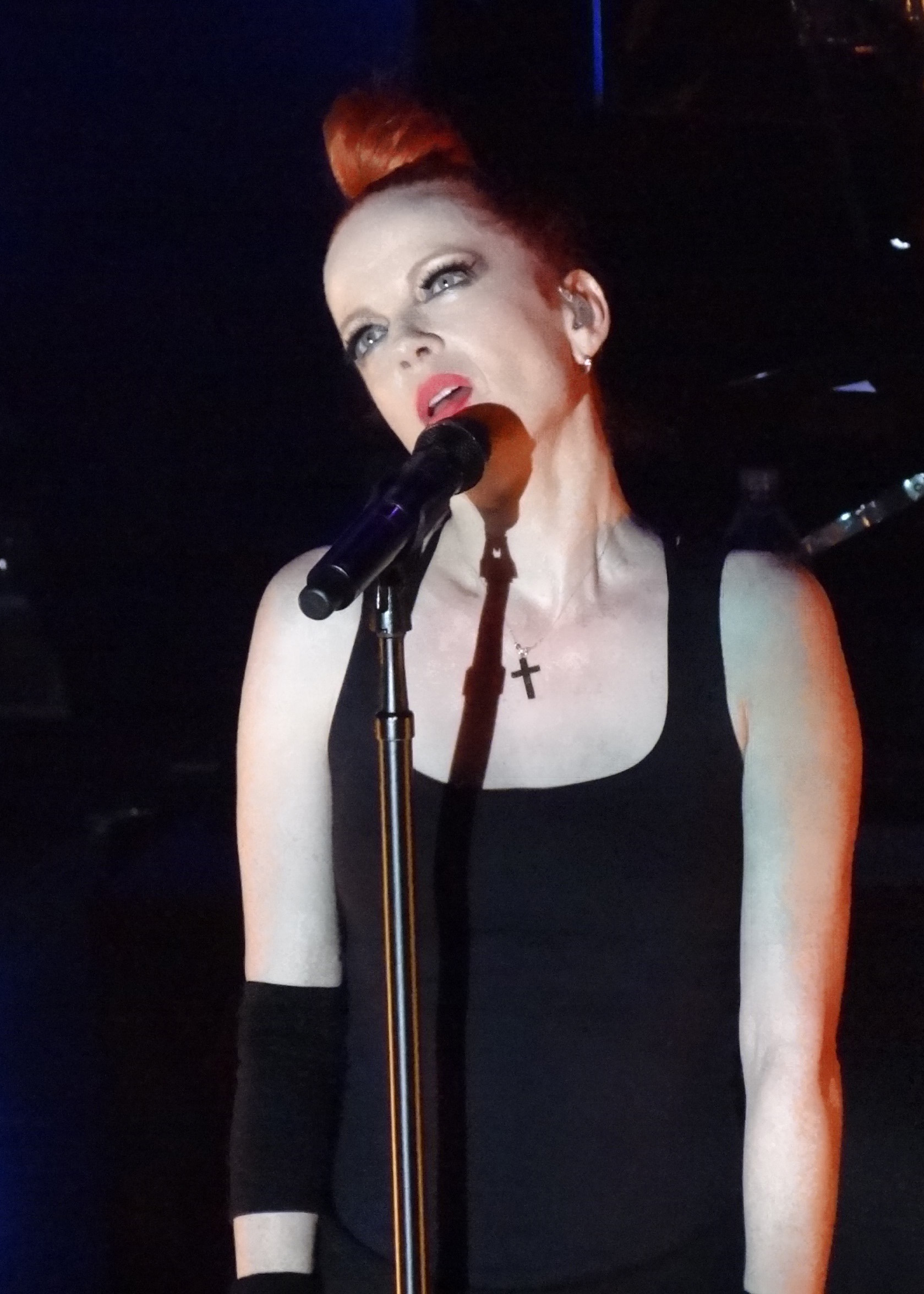
Shirley Manson (pictured) co-wrote "Red Lips" and "I'm on Top" for Ghost and Night Time, My Time: B-Sides Part 1, respectively.

Song	Artist(s)	Writer(s)	Album(s)	Year	Ref.
"108"	Sky Ferreira	Sky Ferreira; Christian Karlsson; Pontus Winnberg; Magnus Lidehäll	As If!	2011	
"17" †	Sky Ferreira	Sky Ferreira; Daniel Luttrell; Carol LeMere	None	2010	
"24 Hours"	Sky Ferreira	Sky Ferreira; Ariel Rechtshaid; Justin Louis Raisen	Night Time, My Time	2013	
"99 Tears"	Sky Ferreira	Sky Ferreira; Greg Kurstin; Nicole Morier	As If!	2011	
"Ain't Your Right"	Sky Ferreira	Sky Ferreira; Ariel Rechtshaid; Justin Louis Raisen; Jordan Benik	Night Time, My Time	2013	
"Black"	G-Dragon featuring Sky Ferreira	G-Dragon; Teddy Park	Coup d'Etat	2013	
"Boys"	Sky Ferreira	Sky Ferreira; Ariel Rechtshaid; Justin Louis Raisen	Night Time, My Time	2013	
"Easy"	Sky Ferreira	Lionel Richie	Baby Driver (Music from the Motion Picture)	2017	
"Everything Is Embarrassing" †	Sky Ferreira	Dev Hynes; Sky Ferreira; Ariel Rechtshaid	Ghost	2012	
"Ghost"	Sky Ferreira	Sky Ferreira; Jon Brion	Ghost	2012	
"Haters Anonymous"	Sky Ferreira	Sky Ferreira; Christian Karlsson; Pontus Winnberg; Klas Åhlund; Magnus Lidehäll	As If!	2011	
"Heavy Metal Heart"	Sky Ferreira	Sky Ferreira; Ariel Rechtshaid; Justin Louis Raisen	Night Time, My Time	2013	
"I Blame Myself"	Sky Ferreira	Sky Ferreira; Ariel Rechtshaid; Justin Louis Raisen; Dan Nigro; Jordan Benik	Night Time, My Time	2013	
"I Can't Say No to Myself"	Sky Ferreira	Sky Ferreira; Ariel Rechtshaid; Justin Louis Raisen; Jordan Benik	Night Time, My Time: B-Sides Part 1	2013	
"I Will"	Sky Ferreira	Sky Ferreira; Ariel Rechtshaid; Justin Louis Raisen; Daniel Nigro	Night Time, My Time	2013	
"I'm on Top"	Sky Ferreira	Sky Ferreira; Jon Brion; Shirley Manson	Night Time, My Time: B-Sides Part 1	2013	
"Kristine"	Sky Ferreira	Sky Ferreira; Ariel Rechtshaid; Ashley Gardner; Justin Louis Raisen	Night Time, My Time	2013	
"Lost in My Bedroom"	Sky Ferreira	Sky Ferreira; Justin Raisen; Daniel Nigro; Ariel Rechtshaid	Ghost	2012	
"Love in Stereo"	Sky Ferreira	Sky Ferreira; Ariel Rechtshaid; Justin Louis Raisen; Daniel Nigro; Jeremiah James Raisen	Night Time, My Time	2013	
"Night Time, My Time"	Sky Ferreira	Sky Ferreira; Justin Louis Raisen	Night Time, My Time	2013	
"Nobody Asked Me (If I Was Okay)"	Sky Ferreira	Sky Ferreira; Ariel Rechtshaid; Justin Louis Raisen	Night Time, My Time	2013	
"Obsession" †	Sky Ferreira	Sky Ferreira; Jerrod Bettis; Justin Franks; Ryan Tedder	None	2010	
"Omanko"	Sky Ferreira	Sky Ferreira; Ariel Rechtshaid; Justin Louis Raisen	Night Time, My Time	2013	
"One" †	Sky Ferreira	Sky Ferreira; Christian Karlsson; Pontus Winnberg; Magnus Lidehäll; Marit Bergman	None	2010	
"Red Lips" †	Sky Ferreira	Shirley Manson; Greg Kurstin	Ghost	2012	
"Sad Dream"	Sky Ferreira	Sky Ferreira; Blake Mills	Ghost	2012	
"Sex Rules" †	Sky Ferreira	Sky Ferreira; Greg Kurstin; Billy Steinberg; Daniel Lutrell	As If!	2011	
"Traces"	Sky Ferreira	Neon Hitch; Colin Munroe	As If!	2011	
"Werewolf (I Like You)"	Sky Ferreira	Sky Ferreira; Jason Hill; Nick Zarin-Ackerman	Night Time, My Time: B-Sides Part 1	2013	
"You're Not the One" †	Sky Ferreira	Sky Ferreira; Ariel Rechtshaid; Justin Louis Raisen; Daniel Nigro	Night Time, My Time	2013	
