= Grant Singer =

American music video and film director

- Born: Grant Taylor Singer; July 23, 1985 (age 41)
- Occupation: Director
- Years active: 2012–present
- Website: grantsinger.com

Grant Taylor Singer (born July 23, 1985) is an American filmmaker, and music video and commercial director known for working with artists such as the Weeknd, Taylor Swift, Troye Sivan, Sky Ferreira, Lorde, Sam Smith, Travis Scott, Ariel Pink and Skrillex. Known as a top music video director, Singer made his feature film directorial debut with Reptile, starring Benicio del Toro and Justin Timberlake, released on Netflix in 2023. He wrote the original screenplay for his second film, Reenactment, starring Del Toro, Cameron Diaz and Ana de Armas, which began shooting in January 2026.

== Education and music video ==
Singer attended film school at Bennington College in Vermont and moved to New York City in 2010. Collaboration on visuals with friends in new bands naturally led to shooting their music videos. In 2012, he gained music industry attention with his video for Sky Ferreira's single, “Everything Is Embarrassing”, and his 2013 independent short film, IRL, in which she also starred. He and Ferreira became roommates and collaborated on a number of other videos. From there, his client list rapidly grew to include The Weeknd for “The Hills,” “Starboy,” and “Can’t Feel My Face”; Lorde's “Green Light" and "Perfect Places”; Taylor Swift and Zayn for “I Don’t Wanna Live Forever”; also Ariana Grande, Future, Vic Mensa and Kanye West, Travis Scott, Young Thug, and Troye Sivan for “My My My!”

== Filmography ==
=== Film ===
Year	Title	Director	Writer
2023	Reptile	Yes	Yes
TBA	Reenactment	Yes	Yes

=== Short film ===
- IRL (2013)
- Mania (2016)

=== Documentary film ===
- Shawn Mendes: In Wonder (2020)
- Youth Museum (2013)

=== Music video ===
Year	Title	Artist(s)	Ref.
2020	"To Die For"	Sam Smith	
2019	"How Do You Sleep?"	Sam Smith	
2019	"No Idea"	Don Toliver	
2018	"Call Out My Name"	The Weeknd	
2018	"Never Be the Same"	Camila Cabello	
2018	"My My My!"	Troye Sivan	
2017	"Perfect Places"	Lorde	
2017	"Green Light"	Lorde	
2017	"I Don't Wanna Live Forever"	Taylor Swift and Zayn	
2017	"Don't Know Why"	Slowdive	
2016	"Wicked"	Future	
2016	"Starboy"	The Weeknd	
2016	"Safari"	J Balvin feat. Pharrell Williams, Bia, Sky	
2016	"Let Me Love You"	Ariana Grande	
2015	"Red Lips" Remix	Skrillex	
2015	"Tell Your Friends"	The Weeknd	
2015	"Can't Feel My Face"	The Weeknd	
2015	"Burial"	Skrillex with Yogi featuring Pusha T, Moody Good and TrollPhace	
2015	"The Hills"	The Weeknd	
2015	"Dayzed Inn Daydreamz"	Ariel Pink	
2014	"Put Your Number In My Phone"	Ariel Pink	
2014	"My Molly"	Ariel Pink	
2014	"I Blame Myself"	Sky Ferreira	
2014	"Night Time, My Time"	Sky Ferreira	
2014	"You're Not the One"	Sky Ferreira	
2014	"Lost in My Bedroom"	Sky Ferreira	
2014	"Sad Dream"	Sky Ferreira	
2014	"Everything Is Embarrassing"	Sky Ferreira	
2014	"Mamacita"	Travi$ Scott	
