= Sex Rules =

Single by Sky Ferreira

from the EP As If!
- Released: March 1, 2011
- Genre: Electropop; synth-pop
- Length: 2:44
- Label: Capitol
- Songwriters: Sky Ferreira; Greg Kurstin; Billy Steinberg; Daniel Lutrell
- Producer: Greg Kurstin

Sky Ferreira singles chronology
"Obsession" (2010)	"Sex Rules" (2011)	"Red Lips" (2012)

"Sex Rules" is a song by American singer Sky Ferreira from her debut extended play (EP), As If! (2011). It was released on March 1, 2011, by Capitol Records as the lead single from the EP. The song was written by Ferreira, Greg Kurstin, Billy Steinberg, and Daniel Lutrell, while production was handled by Kurstin. Looking to transition from the disco music elements seen in her earlier single "17", Ferreira explored electropop and synth-pop styles with "Sex Rules". In the track, Ferreira frankly declares her infatuation for sexual intercourse.

Contemporary music critics commended "Sex Rules" in their reviews, and expressed a particular appreciation for its experimental production. However, the track failed to impact any national record charts. Furthermore, an accompanying music video for the song was never released.

== Background and composition ==
After releasing the tracks "17", "One", and "Obsession", Ferreira announced that her debut studio album would be released on January 11, 2011. However, it was instead replaced by her first extended play (EP) As If!, which was made available on March 22. In anticipation of its release, Capitol Records commissioned "Sex Rules" as the lead single from the project; it was released through the iTunes Store on March 1, 2011. The track, and Ferreira herself, were featured in a commercial for the American fashion house Calvin Klein; she believed that the publicity she received from her projects in the fashion industry was beneficial to her aspirations in the music industry, and specifically credited her first collaboration with Calvin Klein with "[making] a lot of different audiences, both in fashion and music, aware of my work."

"Sex Rules", in addition to the remaining four tracks featured on As If!, was co-written by Ferreira. Greg Kurstin, Billy Steinberg, and Daniel Lutrell provided songwriting contributions during its creation, while Kurstin was solely responsible for overseeing its production. The track prominently explores electropop and synth-pop musical styles, particularly showcasing trends popularized with 1980s music. It represents a stylistic departure from Ferreira's previous tracks and her later projects; "17" was noted for its blending of disco components, while tracks on her second extended play Ghost (2012) and debut studio album Night Time, My Time (2013) experimented with elements more commonly associated with indie pop. In "Sex Rules", Ferreira verbalizes her appreciation for sexual intercourse; during the chorus, she sings "Sex rules, use your god-given tools / Sex rules, I pity the fools who realize too late / Love, sex, and god are great / Oh oh, oh oh, sex rules."

== Critical reception ==
"Sex Rules" received generally favorable reviews from contemporary music critics. Writing for MTV Buzzworthy, Nicole James complimented the track for its successful blending of "super early Madonna" and "21st-century synthpop", and drew similarities to the music of artists such as Chromeo, La Roux, and Robyn. She concluded her commentary by describing the song as "fun [and] sexy". Bradley Stern from MuuMuse spoke favorably of "Sex Rules" in his review for As If!; he directed his praise towards its "blippy, skittering electronica beats and a big fat slapping bass", while additionally noting its apparent inspiration by pop singer Britney Spears. A writer for Idolator expressed excitement that Ferreira continued pursuing her musical endeavors after her earlier cover version of "Animal" by Miike Snow. They commended Ferreira and Steinberg for developing a "hard-to-resist tune" that merged 1980s inspiration with the artistic individuality that Ferreira had become associated with, and thought that the track would help her establish prominence in mainstream culture. Writing for Rolling Stone, Colleen Nika was confident that "Sex Rules" introduced a "spiky" sound that could become popular in the evolving contemporary hit radio market. However, The New York Times' Jon Caramanica opined that the "dry" vocal performance made it difficult for Ferreira to meaningfully deliver the lyrics.

== Track listing ==
Digital download
No.	Title	Writer(s)	Producer(s)	Length
1.	"Sex Rules"	Sky Ferreira; Greg Kurstin; Billy Steinberg; Daniel Lutrell	Kurstin	2:44

== Release history ==
Region	Date	Format	Label	Ref.
United States	March 1, 2011	Digital download	Capitol	
