= Larry Crowne =

2011 film by Tom Hanks

- Theatrical release poster
- Directed by: Tom Hanks
- Written by: Tom Hanks; Nia Vardalos
- Produced by: Gary Goetzman; Tom Hanks
- Starring: Tom Hanks; Julia Roberts; Bryan Cranston; Cedric the Entertainer; Taraji P. Henson; Gugu Mbatha-Raw; Wilmer Valderrama; Pam Grier
- Cinematography: Philippe Rousselot
- Edited by: Alan Cody
- Music by: James Newton Howard
- Production companies: Vendôme Pictures; Playtone
- Distributed by: Universal Pictures (United States); Summit Entertainment (International)
- Release dates: June 27, 2011 (Hollywood); July 1, 2011 (United States)
- Running time: 99 minutes
- Country: United States
- Language: English
- Budget: $30 million
- Box office: $72.1 million

Larry Crowne is a 2011 American romantic comedy film starring Tom Hanks and Julia Roberts. The film was produced and directed by Hanks, who co-wrote its screenplay with Nia Vardalos.

The story was inspired by Hanks' time studying at Chabot College. The film tells the story of Larry Crowne, a middle-aged man who unexpectedly loses his job because he doesn’t have any secondary education. He enrolls in college classes to help ensure job security. Instead he finds a better way to live.

It was released in the United States on July 1, 2011.

== Plot ==
Larry Crowne, a middle-aged Navy veteran, is fired from his job at a big-box store due to a lack of college education, despite his seniority and exemplary work. Divorced and living alone, he cannot find a job and could lose his house. His neighbor Lamar suggests he enroll at East Valley Community College and get an education.

Subsisting on unemployment benefits and unable to afford to drive his SUV, Larry buys a scooter from Lamar. At the college, he becomes part of a colorful community trying to find a better future, and is nicknamed "Lance Corona" by classmate Talia. Two of the classes he takes are speech, taught by Mercedes Tainot, and economics, taught by Dr. Ed Matsutani.

Larry initially struggles in his speech class, stumbling through his first speech about making restaurant quality French toast. Before his recently lost retail job, he had spent 20 years as a cook in the navy. However, Larry does very well in economics, as he appears to be the only student who knows the answers from the assigned reading.

Mercedes drinks at home after school because she is unhappily married to Dean, a former professor-turned-writer-turned-blogger. In reality, Dean spends his days watching internet porn, and she tells him she knows that.

Talia invites Larry to join a club of scooter riders led by her boyfriend Dell Gordo. She also updates Larry's home decor, hair style, and wardrobe. His friend Frank, who runs a diner, offers him a job to help make ends meet, due to Larry's experience with the Navy.

A night out with Dean goes horribly wrong, with the two of them arguing in the car; Mercedes demands he stops to let her out. She is waiting at a bus stop, when Larry and his scooter gang notice her. He offers her a ride home, which she reluctantly accepts. On their way home they witness Dean getting arrested for drunk driving.

At her front door, Mercedes invites Larry to kiss her and they hug, before she passionately starts kissing him. She wants to have sex as well, but Larry declines, not wanting to take advantage of her inebriated state. When Dean arrives home the following morning he finds all of his possessions on the front lawn.

Realizing there is no way he will not lose his house, Larry uses the knowledge he gained in his Economics class to begin a strategic foreclosure. Mercedes, meanwhile, asks Larry not to disclose the events of the previous night, and remains under the false impression that he is romantically involved with the much-younger Talia. It disappoints Larry, who had been excited about Mercedes' interest in him. He goes back to concentrating on his studies and his new job instead.

Mercedes runs into Talia, who is telling Frances, her English teacher, that she will be dropping out of college to start a thrift store. There, she finds out that Talia and Larry are just friends. Later, Frances comes over to Mercedes' to provide emotional and practical support in relation to her impending divorce.

Finals arrive, and Larry is scheduled last. His speech is about his travels around the world while in the Navy, and also manages to include all of his classmates' topics within his own. He is given a big round of applause by his classmates and an A+ grade from Mercedes, who is now happier in her life, and has rediscovered her passion for teaching.

A short while later, Mercedes and Frances show up at Larry's diner. She lets him know that he was an excellent student, to which he replies that she was an excellent teacher. When the next term begins, some of the students from Mercedes' speech course register for her Shakespeare class, but Larry is not with them. He is seen taking Dr. Matsutani's second-term Economics class.

Mercedes walks to her office and sees a note from Larry on the door. It is an invitation for French toast, with the address to his new apartment. She drives there, finding it is above Talia's thrift store. She walks upstairs, Larry comes out of his apartment, they talk briefly and then kiss.

== Cast ==
- Tom Hanks as Larry Crowne
- Julia Roberts as Mercedes "Mercy" Tainot
- Bryan Cranston as Dean Tainot
- Cedric the Entertainer as Lamar
- Taraji P. Henson as B'Ella
- Gugu Mbatha-Raw as Talia
- Wilmer Valderrama as Dell Gordo
- Pam Grier as Frances
- Rita Wilson as Wilma Q. Gammelgaard
- George Takei as Dr. Ed Matsutani
- Rob Riggle as Jack Strang
- Ian Gomez as Frank
- Rami Malek as Steve Dibiasi
- Malcolm Barrett as Dave Mack
- Grace Gummer as Natalia Calimeris
- Maria Canals-Barrera as Lala Pinedo
- Sy Richardson as Avery
- Dale Dye as Cox
- Chet Hanks as Pizza Delivery Boy
- Nia Vardalos as Map Genie (voice)
- Jon Seda as Officer Diamond
- Tina Huang as Team Leader #2
- Randall Park as Trainer Wong
- Sarah Levy as Eli

== Production ==
Larry Crowne was first announced as Talk of the Town in February 2006. Universal Pictures set up the project as a star vehicle for Tom Hanks with Nia Vardalos hired to write the screenplay based on the life of Jim Chandler, a friend of Hanks', about a man who goes through an unexpected career change. In January 2010, Julia Roberts was cast opposite Hanks. In the following October, Bryan Cranston joined the cast. Later in the month, filming began in Los Angeles. The film's production budget totaled $30 million.

== Release ==
Larry Crowne was released in theaters on July 1, 2011. In the United States and Canada, Summit Entertainment originally intended to distribute the film, but Universal Pictures claimed the distribution rights. Universal released Larry Crowne in 2,973 theaters. The film grossed $15.7 million over the four-day opening weekend that included the U.S. holiday Independence Day, ranking fourth at the box office.

The studio reported that 71% of the audience was over 50 years old. The independent firm CinemaScore said its exit polling showed that 93% of the audience was over 25 years old, which The Hollywood Reporter said was "old even for an adult-skewing pic". CinemaScore reported that theatergoers gave the film a "B" grade. The film's box office performance was considered a disappointment, particularly with Hanks and Roberts as the stars.

Larry Crowne grossed $35.6 million in the United States and Canada, though tallies for international box office has varied depending on source. The-Numbers.com reports a worldwide total of $59.8 million whereas Box Office Mojo states a worldwide gross of $72 million. According to Box Office Magazine, the movie has grossed $68.6 million worldwide.

== Reception ==
Larry Crowne received mixed reviews from critics. Review aggregation website Rotten Tomatoes gave the film a rating of 36%, based on 194 reviews. The site's consensus reads, "Despite the relaxed, easy chemistry of stars Tom Hanks and Julia Roberts, Larry Crowne is surprisingly bland and conventional." At Metacritic, which assigns a weighted average score, the film received a score of 41 out of 100, based on 41 critics, indicating "mixed or average" reviews. Audiences polled by CinemaScore gave the film an average grade of "B" on an A+ to F scale.

Roger Ebert gave the film two stars out of four, stating that the film has "a good premise and a colorful supporting cast, but what it doesn't have is a reason for existing".

== Home media ==
The film was released on DVD and Blu-ray on November 15, 2011.

== Soundtrack ==
The film's soundtrack was released by Rhino Records on June 28, 2011.

Track listing:

1. Electric Light Orchestra – "Hold On Tight"
2. Tom Petty – "Runnin' Down a Dream"
3. Swingfly – "Something’s Got Me Started"
4. Billy Squier – "The Stroke"
5. Sky Ferreira – "Obsession"
6. Electric Light Orchestra – "Calling America"
7. Tom Petty & the Heartbreakers – "Listen to Her Heart"
8. Smokey Robinson – "Cruisin'"
9. Tyler Hilton – "Faithful"
10. Tom Petty & the Heartbreakers – "Walls (No.3)"
11. Jarrod Gorbel – "I’ll Do Better"
12. Gigi – "The Hundredth Time"
13. James Newton Howard – "French Toast"
