= Red Lips =

"Red Lips" may refer to:

- Red Lips (film) (1928), film based on The Plastic Age with James T. O'Donohoe
- "Red Lips" (song), a Sky Ferreira song.
- "Red Lips", song by Johnny Desmond 1970
