= As If! (EP) =

2011 EP by Sky Ferreira

EP by Sky Ferreira
- Released: March 22, 2011
- Recorded: 2009–2011
- Length: 16:49
- Label: Capitol
- Producers: Bloodshy & Avant; Greg Kurstin; Magnus Lidehäll; Colin Munroe; Cory Nitta

Sky Ferreira chronology
As If! (2011)	Ghost (2012)

Singles from As If!
- 1. "Sex Rules" Released: March 1, 2011

As If! is the debut extended play (EP) by American singer Sky Ferreira. It was released on March 22, 2011, by Capitol Records, in place of her frequently delayed debut studio album, which eventually became Night Time, My Time (2013). Its lead single "Sex Rules" was released on March 1, 2011.

== Background ==
Ferreira, who had been in contact with music from an early age, started recording professionally when she was 14. This move was done by Ferreira after going to a Daft Punk concert, which she credited with having "changed [her] life"; she also started going to nightclubs and listening to dance music. From there on, Ferreira began making several demos with friends on audio-specializing program GarageBand, and uploading them onto her Myspace account.

Ferreira also featured a remix of the song "Teen Lovers" by American band the Virgins, produced by the Shoes and gained attention online peaking atop the Hype Machine chart. After the production duo Bloodshy & Avant noticed them, Ferreira was introduced to several "major" record labels which became interested in signing her, as well as producers who wanted to work with her. That interest led to a bidding war between several labels, who according to Ferreira, viewed her as a "way of making money".

Due to promises that she would have "creative freedom" and control, Ferreira ultimately opted for EMI. Six months after, she realized that those claims were false, as the executives at the label largely controlled her creative decisions. While recording, Ferreira started working with independent producers, such as Paul Epworth, however the label suggested collaborations with more known musicians—for example, Dr. Luke—as part of a process which was described as "mould[ing]" Ferreira "into the perfect little pop robot".

== Release and promotion ==
Ferreira released two singles in 2010, titled "17" and "One". While the former did not chart, the latter managed to peak at number 64 on the UK Singles Chart. "Obsession" was announced as the lead single from her planned debut, and scheduled for US radio release in September of that year. Simultaneously, the album was announced for a January 11, 2011 release. "Obsession", however, was not able to enter any record chart with the exception of the US Billboard Hot Dance Club Songs. After EMI lost money on promoting Ferreira, the label reduced her budget "dramatically", ultimately leading to the cancellation of the album.

However, the album was postponed and As If! was announced for release on March 22, 2011 by Capitol Records. Prior to the extended play's release, "Sex Rules" was issued as a promotional single on March 1, 2011. Ferreira and "Sex Rules" were concurrently featured in the advertisement campaign for Calvin Klein's CK One brand.

== Composition ==
Unlike Ferreira's later work, her first EP was heavily pop-centric, relying mostly on synthesizers and electronic drums, with no acoustic instruments. On the opening track "Sex Rules", Ferreira sings over a 1980s pop-style beat about sexual liberation, instructing the listener to "Use your god-given tools". "Traces" is a slower ballad produced by Colin Monroe and co-written by English singer Neon Hitch. It contains a dark piano melody, with subtle strings hidden behind robotic dubstep whines and beats. "Haters Anonymous" is an abstract electronic thumper where Ferreira reads the lyrics in a low droning voice, speaking about media backlash and the hypocrisy of her critics. "99 Tears" contains a screaming Siouxsie and the Banshees sample at the intro, followed by more 1980s electropop. Lyrically the song is about revenge on an ex-lover. The closing track "108" tells an abstract tale of a deranged girl in love with an immortal being. The lyrics are stuttered and chanted over melancholic electronic-pop, with Bloodshy & Avant's signature piano arpeggio's and vintage theremin samples.

== Critical reception ==
Professional ratings
Review scores
Source	Rating
MuuMuse	5/5 stars
Rolling Stone	3.5/5 stars

Upon release, As If! received polarizing responses from music journalists. Caryn Ganz of Rolling Stone provided a positive review for the extended play, awarding it a rating of three and a half stars out of five. Ganz described it as "incredibly fun" and while expounding on Ferreira's Internet hype, she stated that the record proved that "the heat isn't just hot air". MuuMuse's Bradley Stern echoed praise for the disc, deeming it a "rock solid" "perfect pop production" and favoring Ferreira's musicality and personality. Writing for The New York Times, Jon Caramanica typed a more mixed critique—while he highlighted As If!'s "inevitability" and its production, he criticized Ferreira's "dry" delivery and the songs' lyricism.

== Track listing ==
As If! track listing
No.	Title	Writer(s)	Producer(s)	Length
1.	"Sex Rules"	Sky Ferreira; Greg Kurstin; Billy Steinberg; Daniel Lutrell	Kurstin	2:46
2.	"Traces"	Ferreira; Neon Hitch; Colin Munroe	Munroe; Cory Nitta	3:34
3.	"Haters Anonymous"	Ferreira; Christian Karlsson; Pontus Winnberg; Klas Åhlund; Magnus Lidehäll	Bloodshy & Avant; Lidehäll	3:48
4.	"99 Tears"	Ferreira; Kurstin; Nicole Morier	Kurstin	3:28
5.	"108"	Ferreira; Karlsson; Winnberg; Åhlund	Bloodshy & Avant; Lidehäll	3:17

== Release history ==
Release dates and formats for As If!
Region	Date	Format	Label	Ref.
Canada	March 22, 2011	Digital download	Capitol	
United States	March 22, 2011	Digital download	Capitol	
