= Night Time, My Time =

2013 studio album by Sky Ferreira

- Original cover. Censored versions of the cover used a cropped version of this image.

Studio album by Sky Ferreira
- Released: October 29, 2013
- Recorded: 2012–2013
- Studios: Heavy Duty (Los Angeles, California) (Note: Tracks 1, 3, 7, 10 and 11); Vox (Los Angeles, California) (Note: Tracks 2 and 10); White Bronco (Highland Park, California) (Note: Tracks 4–6, 8, 9 and 12)
- Genres: Indie rock; synth-pop
- Length: 46:07
- Label: Capitol
- Producer: Ariel Rechtshaid

Sky Ferreira chronology
Ghost (2012)	Night Time, My Time (2013)	Night Time, My Time: B-Sides Part 1 (2013)

Singles from Night Time, My Time
- 1. "You're Not the One" Released: September 24, 2013; 2. "I Blame Myself" Released: June 9, 2014

Night Time, My Time is the debut studio album by American singer Sky Ferreira, released on October 29, 2013, by Capitol Records. Originally set to be released in 2011, following the singles "One" and "Obsession", Capitol repeatedly delayed the album, with many recording sessions that were held for the album going towards EPs As If! (2011) and Ghost (2012), the latter featuring critically acclaimed track "Everything Is Embarrassing".

The final result was primarily written and produced by Ferreira, Ariel Rechtshaid, Justin Raisen, and Dan Nigro, and in a departure from her previous work, musically, it is an indie rock and synth-pop album that explores 1980s pop music, 1990s grunge, and various styles of rock, while its lyrics convey themes such as failure, love, and anger. The album cover, shot by film director Gaspar Noé, controversially depicts a topless Ferreira in a shower. Night Time, My Time received positive reviews from music critics, who praised its sound; it has been recognized by numerous media outlets as one of 2013's best albums and was ranked by Pitchfork as number 43 in a list of the 200 best albums of the 2010s. It was a modest success commercially; it debuted on the US Billboard 200 at number 45 and on the Australian Albums Chart at number 40.

Night Time, My Time was preceded by the digital release of its lead single, "You're Not the One", accompanied by a music video. Capitol Records also issued "24 Hours" and "Boys" as free digital promotional singles, and although it was not released as a single, a music video was filmed for the album's title track.

== Background and development ==
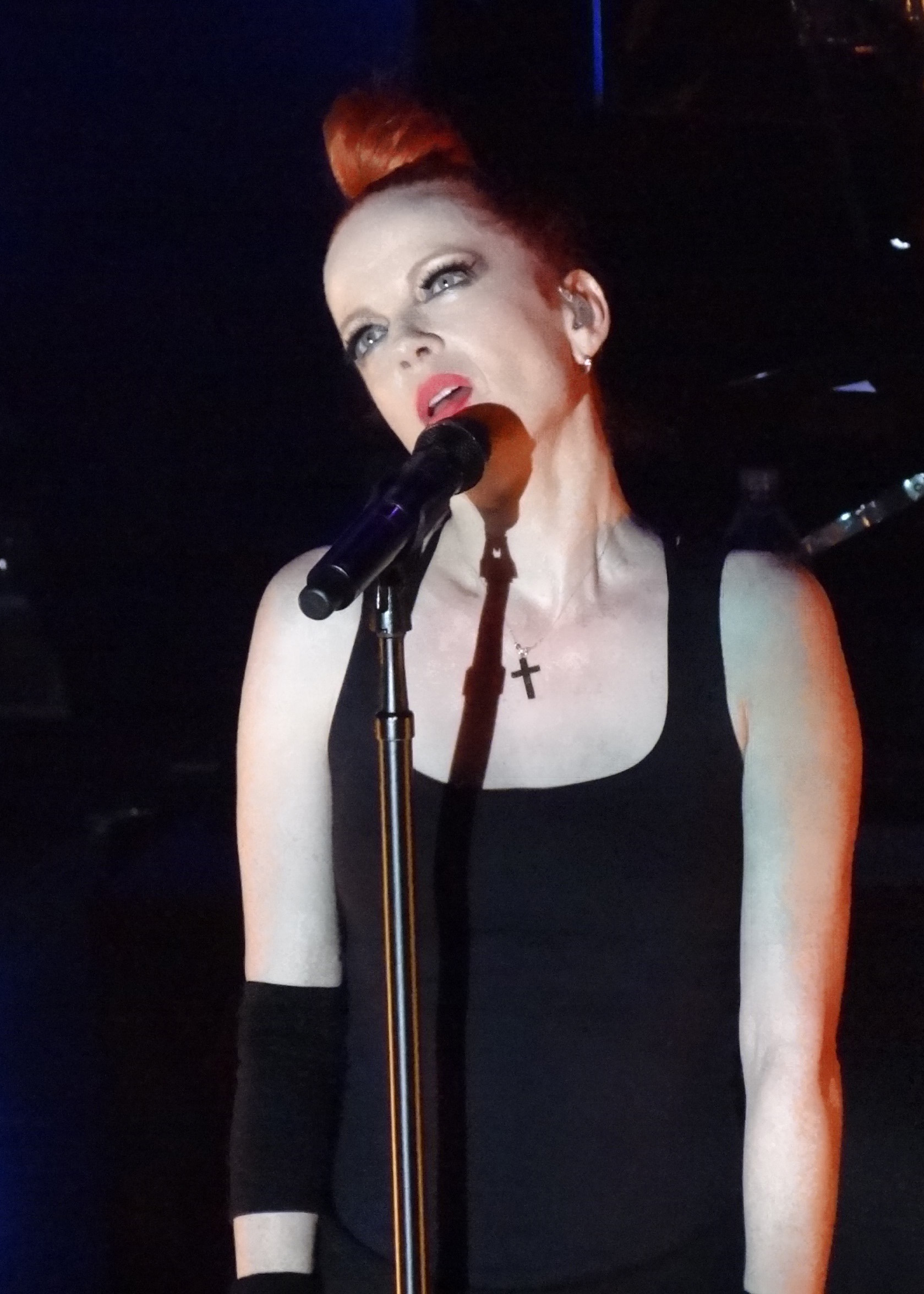
Throughout the album's recording sessions, Ferreira worked with a variety of producers and songwriters, including Shirley Manson (pictured).

After releasing the tracks "17", "One", and "Obsession", Ferreira announced that her debut studio album would be released on January 11, 2011. However, Ferreira's budget was dramatically reduced which led to the cancellation of the record; such release was substituted with the extended play (EP) As If!, which was released on March 22, 2011. In November 2011, Ferreira announced that her debut studio album would be released in 2012, with a lead single planned to precede its release that February. The following month, she revealed that she was currently in the studio, working on her debut album with Jon Brion throughout 2012, and "possibly" with Shirley Manson and Greg Kurstin. In early 2012, Ferreira renamed the LP Wild at Heart, and confirmed "24 Hours" and "Swamp Girl" would be included in it. Another song, entitled "Lost in My Bedroom", surfaced online that March. After releasing the music video for the track "Red Lips" in June, she stated that she had renamed the record once again, changing its title to I'm Not Alright. The album was also briefly referred to as I Will.

Ferreira began working with Ariel Rechtshaid, whom she contacted and met after Rechtshaid had heard "One" and subsequently "liked" Ferreira's Facebook page. After her single "Everything Is Embarrassing" unexpectedly became popular on indie-oriented music blogs, Ferreira released another EP, Ghost, on October 16, 2012. In early 2013, Ferreira intended to release an album composed of a mixture of tracks she had written and recorded with Brion and those she had written and recorded with Rechtshaid. After the album experienced more delays, Ferreira decided to keep recording with Rechtshaid and co-producer Justin Raisen in order to make the album more cohesive in sound, dropping the Brion-produced tracks from the record. After her record label refused to fund the album's recording sessions any further, Ferreira did so herself, with money she had earned from her modeling career to cover the costs of recording and equipment for these sessions. A majority of the album's content was completely recorded, mixed, and mastered in just a few weeks during August 2013. On August 29, 2013, Ferreira posted a photograph on her Facebook page indicating that the record was complete.

== Music and lyrics ==
Night Time, My Time is an indie rock and synth-pop album, exploring different musical styles of those heard on Ferreira's second EP Ghost (2012). While the latter had a more "relaxed" sonic atmosphere—featuring electropop, synth-pop and acoustic styles—the album incorporates 1980s pop and 1990s grunge, while also drawing inspiration from 1970s art rock and 1980s psychedelic rock, new wave, and post-punk. The songs occasionally include guitars and "hard-hitting", as on "I Will" and "You're Not the One"; however, the album incorporates diverse music genres, including new wave on "Love in Stereo" and "24 Hours", and ska on "Kristine". Amongst other elements in the album's songs, are arcade game samples. The atmosphere of the album was said to evoke records of Best Coast, Garbage, and Siouxsie and the Banshees with "distorted tracks".

Ferreira, who mostly sings in a low register, explores a multitude of lyrical themes. A prominent one is failure, provoked by record label manipulation and oppression. Ferreira stated that the record was her try at getting the listeners to "know [her]", and further said that in the record, she felt like herself and that she had control over such lyricism. However, another scope of themes is present on the record, such as love, inconstant relationships and feminism. Her personality is reflected through an array of states of spirit—frustration and anger are contrasted with vulnerability, "redemption" and self-confidence. Night Time, My Time was named after lines spoken by Laura Palmer in the film Twin Peaks: Fire Walk with Me (1992); Ferreira would later star in an episode of Twin Peaks: The Return (2017).

Jacques Peterson from Popdust recognized grunge and new wave music elements within "Boys", while Mike Wass from Idolator described the track as a "guitar-pop tune". Annie Zaleski from The A.V. Club stated that its lyrical content sees Ferreira "optimistic about love" after having found her ideal boyfriend.

== Release and artwork ==
Most of the people who had a problem with [the cover art] were men. At this point, I feel like I'm doing a bad job of being a feminist if I'm not making someone angry. But I'm making art and doing things that are true to my work. I'm not trying to sell my body, but it's my body to sell if I did want to! This kind of cover isn't even what sells – what sells is your face, shot by a fashion photographer, but I didn't want to do something like that. I do that all the time.

— Ferreira on the controversy generated by the album's artwork

The artwork for Night Time, My Time was photographed by Argentine director Gaspar Noé at Hotel Amour in Paris, and was unveiled by Ferreira on October 10, 2013. It depicts the close-up of a topless Ferreira, whose left breast is exposed and is wearing a cross necklace, inside of a green-tiled shower. She originally considered using another picture for the album artwork, and was additionally encouraged by Capitol Records to choose an older photograph where she was seen with "long blonde hair [...] sitting on a bed looking cute [...] in a black dress looking pretty". Ferreira ultimately selected the topless image because she felt it more accurately reflected the nature of the record. The artwork for the album on most streaming services is censored and does not show her breasts. The uncensored version is available on the cover of the vinyl release.

Night Time, My Time was released as a digital download through the iTunes Store in the United States on October 29, 2013, where it was exclusively available until November 5, 2013. It was additionally made available for pre-order on CD and LP formats, although Ferreira publicly criticized Capitol Records when they were unavailable for its initial release and announced that she would self-fund the creation of vinyl versions. Following the launch of her third extended play, Night Time, My Time: B-Sides Part 1, in November, her MyPlayDirect store began selling bundles that included a green translucent vinyl pressing, a compact disc, a digital download, and a poster of the album artwork. Ferreira announced that the pre-ordered copies of Night Time, My Time were shipped on November 27, while Capitol Records released their own vinyl versions of the record on January 28, 2014. A limited edition that included Ferreira's second extended play, Ghost (2012), was also released.

In February 2014, it was reported that "Boys" would be serviced as the second single from Night Time, My Time, following "You're Not the One". Ferreira clarified via Twitter that the track would not serve as the album's official second single, and it was ultimately released as a free promotional digital download in the United Kingdom on March 1, 2014, preceding the launch of Night Time, My Time in the country. It is shortened by two seconds on its individual release. Its single cover depicts an orange-tinted close-up of Ferreira, placed in front of a water-textured background.

== Promotion ==
"You're Not the One" was released as the lead single from Night Time, My Time on September 24, 2013. Its music video, paying visual homage to 1983 film The Hunger and set in a high-fashion nightclub, was released on the same day. On November 25, 2013, Ferreira appeared on the program Late Show with David Letterman, where she performed the single. "24 Hours" was released as a free promotional single on the same day of the album's release. A music video for the album's title track, directed by Grant Singer and released on November 27, 2013, sees Ferreira wearing a variety of wigs and lingerie. Natasha Stagg of V wrote that, in the video, Ferreira "embraces the title she's been deemed by dressing in provocatively infantile accessories" and "cleverly [delivers] the junkie role back in her detractors' faces." Consequence of Sound named the video among the best of 2013. Though not a single, on December 19, 2014, "Omanko" received a music video, directed by Ferreira's then-boyfriend, DIIV frontman Zachary Cole Smith, consisting of "silly homemade videos of Ferreira spliced with footage of her onstage performances" in a lo-fi quality. The video was later taken off of YouTube by a copyright claim from Universal Music Group.

Prior to the album release, US tour dates featuring Ferreira alongside Vampire Weekend and Smith Westerns were revealed. Due to a vocal injury, Ferreira canceled the tour with three shows remaining. On November 25, 2013, a live concert with Ferreira was held at Rough Trade New York, followed by a signing session. The attendance could purchase the original LP along with its Night Time, My Time: B-sides Part I EP. In addition to serving as an opening act for several dates of Miley Cyrus's worldwide Bangerz Tour, Ferreira also promoted the record at one-off headlining shows and festival appearances throughout 2014, punctuated by a five-date run of West Coast shows in November.

== Critical reception ==
Professional ratings
Aggregate scores
Source	Rating
AnyDecentMusic?	7.5/10
Metacritic	79/100
Review scores
Source	Rating
AllMusic	5/5 stars
The A.V. Club	B+
Fact	4/5
The Guardian	4/5 stars
Mojo	4/5 stars
NME	8/10
Pitchfork	8.1/10
Q	4/5 stars
Rolling Stone	2.5/5 stars
Spin	7/10

Night Time, My Time received generally positive reviews from music critics. At Metacritic, which assigns a normalized rating out of 100 to reviews from mainstream publications, the album received an average score of 79, based on 30 reviews. Writing for AllMusic, Heather Phares complimented the record for being "consistently good", and elaborated that Ferreira successfully blended "her teen pop past with her current interest in indie rock in surprising, creative, and always catchy ways". Annie Zaleski from The A.V. Club commented that it seemed "like the first release on which Ferreira is truly engaged with the music she's creating", and placed particular praise towards her success in "portraying [herself] as a complex person who's successfully discovered her own voice." Lauren Martin from Fact appreciated that Ferreira "[tells] personal tales of familiar issues of love, heartbreak and identity in refreshed and engaging ways", which she elaborated was her personal "highlight" from the record. Carrie Battan from Pitchfork stated that Night Time, My Time was "one of the most pleasingly conventional and cohesive pieces of pop-rock to come along this year" for integrating "80s pop sparkle and full-bodied 90s grunge in a streamlined way."

Writing for PopMatters, Elias Leight felt that the fact that Night Time, My Time "[came] out half a lifetime after she started trying to make music" exemplified a "survive and stay" philosophy; he suggested that said dedication would provide Ferreira with career longevity. Kevin Leidel from Slant Magazine commented that the record had the potential of becoming the "gaunt, darkly painted neurosis" that would successfully "combat popular music's deluge of silly and crude self-affirmations." Jordan Sargent from Spin enjoyed seeing Ferreira confidently and comfortably "reveling in the swirling cacophony that is her sound and her life." Referencing its frequent delays, Lavanya Ramanthan from The Washington Post opined that Night Time, My Time "[normalized] the singer" and "might even have listeners rooting for her." However, Stacey Anderson from Rolling Stone offered a more mixed review of Night Time, My Time; she criticized it for "[sounding] like a soundtrack for The Breakfast Club remake playing in her head." Samuel Tolzmann from Pretty Much Amazing felt that the quality of the record dropped off from "Omanko" through the remainder of the album. Benji Taylor of Clash panned the album as "cheap theatrics masquerading as inspired art".

=== Accolades ===
Several media publications recognized Night Time, My Time as one of the best albums of 2013. The staff from Idolator listed the record as their favorite record of the year, writing that the project "is not only a defining (long awaited) first statement, but a defying, perfectly imperfect middle finger in the air." It was additionally placed as the second best album by Dazed and Fact, and the sixth best record by The New York Times and Stereogum. The staff from Popjustice ranked Night Time, My Time as the ninth best album of 2013, simply commenting that "she did it." Pitchfork described the project as "blown-speaker, smeared-lipstick pop—would-be radio hits with that last topcoat of paint left incomplete", and acknowledged it as the 15th best record of 2013. Rolling Stone, Complex, and The Guardian respectively placed the album as the 21st, 25th, and 27th best record of 2013. Consequence of Sound listed Night Time, My Time as the 49th best album of the year, adding that "if teens are digging Night Time, My Time, they're only a few steps removed from Suicide, Bauhaus, Siouxsie and the Banshees, and Blondie." Although its rank was not specified, NPR and The New Yorker recognized the record as among the best of the year.

Some of the publications ranking the album as one of the best of the 2010s decade are:

Decade-end lists
Publication	List	Rank	Ref.
AllMusic	200 Best Albums of the 2010s	—N/a	
Billboard	The 100 Greatest Albums of the 2010s	88	
Consequence of Sound	The 100 Top Albums of the 2010s	52	
Consequence of Sound	Top 25 Pop Albums of the 2010s	9	
The Independent	The 50 Best Albums of the Decade	45	
Paste	The 100 Best Albums of the 2010s	94	
Paste	The 30 Best Pop Albums of the 2010s	11	
Pitchfork	The 200 Best Albums of the 2010s	43	
Rolling Stone	The 100 Best Albums of the 2010s	56	
Spin	The 101 Best Albums of the 2010s	31	
Stereogum	The 100 Best Albums of the 2010s	8	

== Commercial performance ==
Night Time, My Time debuted at number 45 on the US Billboard 200, on the strength of digital downloads from its exclusive first-week release through the iTunes Store. In doing so, it became her highest-charting record in the country; by comparison, her second extended play Ghost (2012) reached number eight on the Billboard Heatseekers Albums chart. As of November 2014, the album had sold 39,000 copies in the United States, according to Nielsen SoundScan. In Australia, Night Time, My Time peaked at number 40 on the ARIA Albums Chart. The album debuted at number 73 on the UK Albums Chart, selling 1,337 copies in its first week.

== Track listing ==
Standard edition
No.	Title	Writer(s)	Length
1.	"Boys"	Sky Ferreira; Ariel Rechtshaid; Justin Raisen	4:40
2.	"Ain't Your Right"	Ferreira; Rechtshaid; Justin Raisen; Jordan Benik	3:22
3.	"24 Hours"	Ferreira; Rechtshaid; Justin Raisen	4:05
4.	"Nobody Asked Me (If I Was Okay)"	Ferreira; Rechtshaid; Justin Raisen; Jeremiah Raisen	4:07
5.	"I Blame Myself"	Ferreira; Rechtshaid; Justin Raisen; Daniel Nigro; Benik	3:57
6.	"Omanko"	Ferreira; Rechtshaid; Justin Raisen	4:36
7.	"You're Not the One"	Ferreira; Rechtshaid; Justin Raisen; Nigro	3:56
8.	"Heavy Metal Heart"	Ferreira; Rechtshaid; Justin Raisen	4:16
9.	"Kristine"	Ferreira; Rechtshaid; Justin Raisen; Ashlee Gardner	2:40
10.	"I Will"	Ferreira; Rechtshaid; Justin Raisen; Nigro	3:19
11.	"Love in Stereo"	Ferreira; Rechtshaid; Justin Raisen; Jeremiah Raisen; Nigro	3:19
12.	"Night Time, My Time"	Ferreira; Justin Raisen	3:50
Total length:			46:07

International edition bonus tracks
No.	Title	Writer(s)	Producer(s)	Length
13.	"Everything Is Embarrassing"	Ferreira; Rechtshaid; Devonté Hynes	Rechtshaid; Blood Orange^{[a]}	4:09
14.	"Everything Is Embarrassing" (Unknown Mortal Orchestra remix)	Ferreira; Rechtshaid; Hynes	Unknown Mortal Orchestra^{[b]}	6:54
Total length:				57:10

Limited edition bonus disc: Ghost EP
No.	Title	Writer(s)	Producer(s)	Length
1.	"Sad Dream"	Ferreira; Blake Mills	Mills	3:34
2.	"Lost in My Bedroom"	Ferreira; Rechtshaid; Justin Raisen; Nigro	Rechtshaid	3:13
3.	"Ghost"	Ferreira; Jon Brion	Brion	5:27
4.	"Red Lips"	Shirley Manson; Greg Kurstin	Kurstin	2:22
5.	"Everything Is Embarrassing"	Ferreira; Rechtshaid; Hynes	Rechtshaid; Blood Orange^{[a]}	4:09
Total length:				18:41

Japanese edition
No.	Title	Length
6.	"You're Not the One"	3:56
7.	"Heavy Metal Heart"	4:16
8.	"Kristine"	2:40
9.	"I Will"	3:19
10.	"Love in Stereo"	3:19
11.	"Night Time, My Time"	3:50
12.	"Sad Dream"	3:34
13.	"Lost in My Bedroom"	3:13
14.	"Ghost"	5:27
15.	"Red Lips"	2:22
16.	"Everything Is Embarrassing"	4:09
17.	"Everything Is Embarrassing" (Unknown Mortal Orchestra remix)	6:54
Total length:		67:06

=== Notes ===
- ^{^[a]} signifies a co-producer
- ^{^[b]} signifies a remix producer

== Personnel ==
Credits adapted from the liner notes of Night Time, My Time.

=== Musicians ===
- Sky Ferreira – vocals (all tracks)
- Ariel Rechtshaid – organ (track 1); guitars (tracks 1–3, 7); programming (tracks 1, 2); keyboards (tracks 2, 7–9); additional vocals (tracks 3, 4, 7, 9, 10); synths (tracks 3, 4, 11); drums (track 5), bass (track 7)
- Justin Raisen – synths (tracks 1, 3, 5, 11); guitars (tracks 1–4, 6–10); programming (track 1); keyboards (tracks 2, 4–10); bass (tracks 2, 4–6, 8, 10, 12); additional vocals (tracks 3–10, 12); drums (tracks 5, 6, 8, 9, 12); Optigan, Mellotron (track 12)
- Jordan Benik – keyboards (track 2)
- Garrett Ray – drums (tracks 2, 3, 7)
- Sean Fitzgerald – drums (track 4)
- Lily Elise – additional vocals (tracks 4, 8)
- Jeremiah Raisen – additional vocals (tracks 4, 6)
- Mereki Beach – additional vocals (track 5)
- Daniel Nigro – additional vocals (tracks 5, 7, 10); keyboards (tracks 5, 10, 11); guitars (tracks 7, 10)
- Ashlee Gardner – additional vocals, bass (track 9)

=== Technical ===
- Ariel Rechtshaid – production (all tracks); recording (tracks 1–3, 7, 10, 11)
- Justin Raisen – co-production (all tracks); recording, Pro Tools engineering (tracks 4–6, 8, 9, 12); mixing (tracks 5, 6)
- Sky Ferreira – executive production
- Nick Rowe – editing (tracks 3, 4, 6–8, 11)
- Jeremiah Raisen – Pro Tools engineering assistance (tracks 4–6, 8, 9, 12)
- Daniel Nigro – Pro Tools engineering assistance, editing (track 5)
- David Schiffman – mixing (tracks 1–4, 7–12)
- Chris Kasych – Pro Tools engineering
- Mark Santangelo – Pro Tools engineering assistance
- Emily Lazar – mastering at The Lodge, New York City
- Rich Morales – mastering assistance

=== Artwork ===
- Gaspar Noé – photography
- Sydney Nichols – layout

== Charts ==
Chart (2013–2014)	Peak position
Australian Albums (ARIA)	40
Scottish Albums (Official Charts)	97
UK Albums (Official Charts)	73
US Billboard 200	45

== Release history ==
Region	Date	Format	Label	Ref(s)
Canada	October 29, 2013	Digital download (iTunes Store exclusive)	Capitol	
Mexico	October 29, 2013	Digital download (iTunes Store exclusive)	Capitol	
United States	October 29, 2013	Digital download (iTunes Store exclusive)	Capitol	
Canada	November 5, 2013	CD; digital download	Capitol	
United States	November 5, 2013	CD; digital download	Capitol	
Australia	January 31, 2014	CD; digital download	Universal	
New Zealand	January 31, 2014	CD; digital download	Universal	
Ireland	March 14, 2014	CD	Polydor	
France	March 17, 2014	CD; digital download	Capitol	
Ireland	March 17, 2014	Digital download	Capitol	
United Kingdom	March 17, 2014	CD; digital download	Polydor	
Japan	July 23, 2014	CD; digital download	Universal	

== Night Time, My Time: B-Sides Part 1 ==
Night Time, My Time: B-Sides Part 1
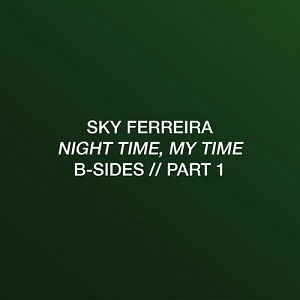

EP by Sky Ferreira
- Released: November 25, 2013
- Studios: Vox (Los Angeles, California) (Note: Track 1); Heavy Duty (Los Angeles, California) (Note: Tracks 1 and 4); Capitol (Hollywood, California) (Note: Track 2); Ulysses (Los Angeles, California) (Note: Track 3)
- Length: 21:01
- Label: Capitol
- Producers: Jon Brion; Jason Hill; Ariel Rechtshaid

Sky Ferreira chronology
Night Time, My Time (2013)	Night Time, My Time: B-Sides Part 1 (2013)	Masochism (TBA)

Night Time, My Time: B-Sides Part 1 is the third extended play (EP) by American singer Sky Ferreira, released on November 25, 2013, by Capitol Records. It includes three previously unreleased tracks, in addition to the original version and the Unknown Mortal Orchestra remix of her earlier single "Everything Is Embarrassing" from her second extended play Ghost (2012).

=== Track listing ===
No.	Title	Writer(s)	Producer(s)	Length
1.	"I Can't Say No to Myself"	Sky Ferreira; Ariel Rechtshaid; Justin Raisen; Jeremiah Raisen; Jordan Benik	Rechtshaid; Justin Raisen^{[d]}	3:58
2.	"I'm on Top"	Ferreira; Shirley Manson; Jon Brion	Brion	4:33
3.	"Werewolf (I Like You)"	Ferreira; Jason Hill; Nick Zarin-Ackerman	Hill; Brion^{[d]}	3:00
4.	"Everything Is Embarrassing"	Ferreira; Rechtshaid; Devonté Hynes	Rechtshaid; Blood Orange^{[c]}	4:09
5.	"Everything Is Embarrassing" (Unknown Mortal Orchestra remix)	Ferreira; Rechtshaid; Hynes	Unknown Mortal Orchestra^{[e]}	6:54
Total length:				21:01

Notes

- ^{^[c]} signifies a co-producer
- ^{^[d]} signifies an additional producer
- ^{^[e]} signifies a remix producer

=== Personnel ===
Credits adapted from the liner notes of Night Time, My Time: B-Sides Part 1.

- Ariel Rechtshaid – recording (tracks 1, 4); keys (track 4)
- David Schiffman – mixing (track 1)
- Emily Lazar – mastering (track 1)
- Rich Morales – mastering assistance (track 1)
- Jon Brion – all instruments (track 2); additional production (track 3)
- Greg Koller – recording, mixing (track 2)
- Eric Caudieux – additional programming, editing (track 2)
- Patricia Sullivan – mastering (tracks 2, 3)
- Jason Hill – recording (track 3)
- Rich Costey – mixing (tracks 3, 4)
- Chris Kasych – Pro Tools engineering (tracks 3, 4)
- Mark Santangelo – Pro Tools engineering assistance (tracks 3, 4)
- Magic Ghost (Jason Hill and Nick Ackerman) – all instruments (track 3)
- Devonté Hynes – keys (track 4)
- Nick Rowe – editing (track 4)
- Kevin Bartley – mastering (track 4)
- Chris Athens – mastering (track 5)
