= Red Lips (song) =

Single by Sky Ferreira

from the EP Ghost
- Released: July 17, 2012
- Genre: Pop rock; grunge
- Length: 2:21
- Label: Capitol
- Songwriter(s): Shirley Manson; Greg Kurstin
- Producer(s): Greg Kurstin

Sky Ferreira singles chronology
"Sex Rules" (2011)	"Red Lips" (2012)	"Everything Is Embarrassing" (2013)

Music video
- "Red Lips" on YouTube

"Red Lips" is a song by American singer Sky Ferreira from her second extended play (EP), Ghost (2012). It was released on July 17, 2012, by Capitol Records. The song was written and produced by Greg Kurstin, with additional songwriting provided by Shirley Manson. "Red Lips" is a pop rock song that describes the emotional deterioration of an individual that Ferreira disliked. It differs from the previous electropop styles displayed in her earlier works; this was deliberately done to prevent Ferreira from being branded in a similar fashion as Britney Spears, which she felt that Capitol Records had intended to do.

Despite Ghost itself garnering mixed reviews, "Red Lips" received generally favorable reviews from music critics, who complimented its overall production. However, the track failed to impact any national record charts. An accompanying music video for "Red Lips" was directed by Terry Richardson and was premiered through Richardson's YouTube channel on June 12, 2012. Critics directed their commentaries towards Ferreira's increasingly risqué public persona, shifting from the more innocent image with which she launched her career.

== Background and composition ==
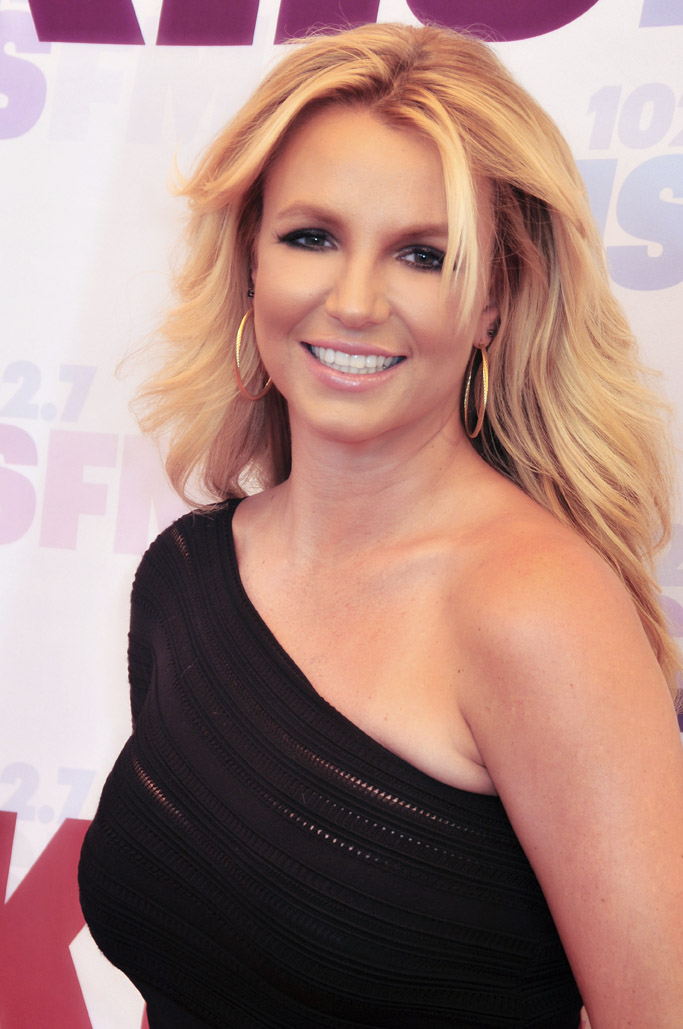
"Red Lips" was offered to Ferreira to avoid marketing her like Britney Spears (pictured)

With her debut studio album having been frequently delayed throughout the early 2010s, Ferreira released her second extended play Ghost on October 2, 2012, while simultaneously continuing production of her full-length album. "Red Lips" appears as the fourth of five songs on the track listing; a preview of the song was first released through YouTube earlier that February. "Red Lips" was later heard on the television series Gossip Girl, during the episode "Save the Last Chance" from its sixth and final season on November 26, 2012.

"Red Lips" was written and produced by Greg Kurstin, with additional songwriting provided by Shirley Manson. Ferreira first collaborated with Kurstin on her demo track "Femme Fatale" and first came into contact with Manson through her Myspace profile which she had been uploading her music on. They were concerned that her record label intended to brand her like Britney Spears; these conversations prompted Manson to offer Ferreira the track "Red Lips". She made lyrical adjustments to remove slang commonly used in British English, including the term "taking a piss", to better suit the American Ferreira. The track incorporates pop rock and grunge musical styles, becoming a departure from the electropop elements explored in her earlier tracks. "Red Lips" also includes prominent guitar instrumentation, which Michael Cragg from The Guardian felt signaled a musical transition for Ferreira; he further compared the song to the works of the band Yeah Yeah Yeahs. Bradley Stern from MuuMuse noted that the blending of "intimidating stabs of guitars and a wicked drum pulse" showcased "the acidic side of Sky's attitude".

Ferreira stated that the lyrics for "Red Lips" were intended as a narrative of the emotional breakdown of "a very specific person or a type [that] always made me feel uncomfortable". In October 2012, DJ Com Truise released a synth-pop remix of "Red Lips", which a writer for Fact felt complimented the songs on his debut studio album Galactic Melt (2011). The DSL remix of the original track is included in the soundtrack album to the feature film Vampire Academy (2014).

== Critical reception ==
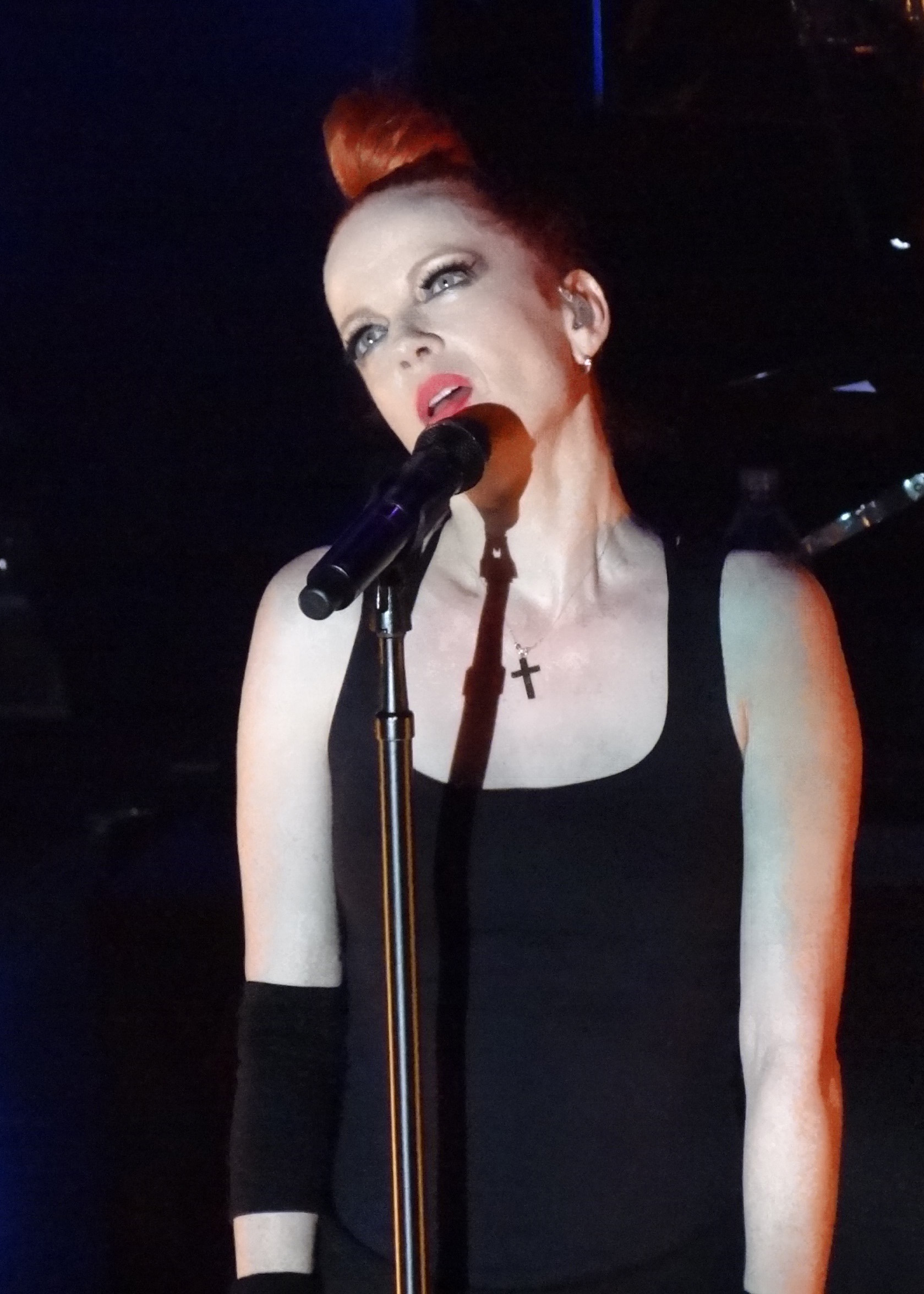
Music critics compared "Red Lips" to the works of the band Garbage, which songwriter Shirley Manson (pictured) is a member of.

"Red Lips" received generally favorable reviews from music critics, who complimented its overall production. Writing for Consequence of Sound, Tony Hardy offered a favorable review and appreciated the grunge music elements seen throughout the track, despite opining that its parent extended play Ghost (2012) lacked a creative focus. Michael Cragg from The Guardian recognized the track as a "welcome return for Sky Ferreira", and compared it to the works of the band Garbage, which songwriter Shirley Manson is a member of. Bradley Stern from MuuMuse shared a similar sentiment, elaborating that the track "plays like the unofficial sequel" to "Cherry Lips" by the band. Jon Caramanica from The New York Times drew comparisons to the tracks "Owner of a Lonely Heart" by Yes and "In Bloom" by Nirvana. Writing for Pitchfork, Katherine St. Asaph appreciated that Ferreira "fares better and sounds far more comfortable" on tracks including "Red Lips", which she felt that Ferreira "[sells] with a distant, almost tossed-off vocal." In a more mixed review, a writer for Tiny Mix Tapes was disappointed that Ferreira came across as an "imitation" of Avril Lavigne and Fefe Dobson on the track.

== Music video ==
"We were planning on doing a music video but then we couldn’t get the right concept for it, so he was like 'I have a tarantula at my studio, Just try and do something with it.' And I was like 'Yeah sure I'll try.'"

— Ferreira describing the conception of the music video.

An accompanying music video for "Red Lips" was directed by Terry Richardson. She went into its filming open-minded in regards to its concept, and ultimately agreed with the creative direction that Richardson proposed. The final product was premiered through Richardson's YouTube channel on June 12, 2012; it later appeared on Ferreira's Vevo channel on July 13. The clip sees Ferreira, dressed in underwear, applying lipstick on her entire face, and is interspersed with footage of its co-star, the spider "Toby the Tarantula", crawling across her body. She stated that her wardrobe was intended to complement the simplistic nature of the music video, rather than an attempt to create sex appeal.

Critics directed their commentaries of the music video towards Ferreira's increasingly risqué public persona, shifting from the more innocent image with which she launched her career. A writer from MuuMuse provided a favorable review, comparing it to the visuals for "Criminal" by Fiona Apple and summarizing that "Sky Ferreira is cooler than anything you and I could ever be." Becky Bain from Idolator stated that the appearance of Toby the Tarantula was "somehow nowhere near as disconcerting as the image of Sky, looking washed out with platinum hair against a white background, crazily painting her face with a tube of red lipstick." Michael Cragg of The Guardian felt that Ferreira's friendship with the controversial Richardson showcased a "shift away from the pop princess she felt she was being moulded into", and commented that the spider was "not for the faint-hearted".

== Track listing ==
Digital download
No.	Title	Writer(s)	Producer(s)	Length
1.	"Red Lips"	Shirley Manson; Greg Kurstin	Kurstin	2:21

== Credits and personnel ==
Credits adapted from the liner notes of the limited edition of Night Time, My Time.

=== Recording ===
- Mixed at Eldorado Recording Studios (Burbank, California)
- Mastered at Masterdisk (New York City, New York)

=== Personnel ===
- Sky Ferreira – vocals
- Greg Kurstin – production
- Rich Costey – mixing
- Vlado Meller – mastering

== Release history ==
Region	Date	Format	Label	Ref.
United States	July 17, 2012	Digital download	Capitol	
Canada	July 17, 2012	Digital download	Capitol	
