= Ghost (Sky Ferreira EP) =

EP by Sky Ferreira
- Released: October 16, 2012
- Recorded: 2011–2012
- Studios: Ruby Red (Los Angeles, California); Heavy Duty (Los Angeles, California); Capitol (Hollywood, California); Echo (Los Angeles, California)
- Genre: Synth-pop
- Length: 18:41
- Label: Capitol
- Producers: Blood Orange; Jon Brion; Greg Kurstin; Blake Mills; Ariel Rechtshaid

Sky Ferreira chronology
As If! (2011)	Ghost (2012)	Night Time, My Time (2013)

Singles from Ghost
- 1. "Red Lips" Released: July 17, 2012; 2. "Everything Is Embarrassing" Released: April 14, 2013

Ghost is the second extended play (EP) by American singer Sky Ferreira. It was released on October 16, 2012, by Capitol Records. It was made available in place of her frequently delayed debut studio album, which eventually became Night Time, My Time (2013). Ghost represents a musical departure from Ferreira's earlier work, which explored more prominent elements of dance-pop. She collaborated with producers including Ariel Rechtshaid, Greg Kurstin, Jon Brion, Dev Hynes, and Blake Mills to achieve her desired sound. Their efforts resulted in a primarily synth-pop record, although it differs from her earlier work in that it sees additional influences from acoustic, indie pop and new wave music.

Ghost received mixed to positive reviews from music critics, who appreciated its diversity, but were ambivalent towards its overall cohesiveness. It peaked at numbers eight and 71 on the US Billboard Top Heatseekers and Alternative Albums record charts, respectively. Along with three other tracks, the extended play included the singles "Red Lips" and "Everything Is Embarrassing".

== Background ==
After releasing the tracks "17", "One", and "Obsession", Ferreira announced that her debut studio album would be released on January 11, 2011. However, it was instead replaced by her first extended play (EP) As If!, which was made available on March 22 of that year. That November, Ferreira announced that her debut studio album would be released in 2012, with a lead single planned to precede its release that February. She was later revealed to have been working with Jon Brion, Greg Kurstin, and Shirley Manson on the project. Plans to release an extended play titled Ghost were revealed by Pitchfork on August 30, 2012. The extended play's cover artwork was photographed by Hedi Slimane and revealed by Ferreira through her Twitter account on September 17; the black-and-white close-up image depicts a blonde Ferreira holding her hair while dressed in a denim jacket. Although the extended play was initially slated for an October 2 release, it was ultimately released on October 16 in the United States and Canada.

== Composition ==
Ghost incorporates styles from several musical genres, whereas her earlier works more prominently incorporated electropop styles. Writing for Now, Kevin Ritchie felt that the project "suggests a much broader range of intriguing possibilities [...] for her dusky voice" than her previous music allowed, further suggesting that her earlier tracks "One" and "Obsession" saw Ferreira "succumbing" to the requests of her record label. Its opening track "Sad Dream" integrates acoustic guitar instrumentation; Joe Marvilli from No Ripcord stated that Ferreira's vocals "almost [cracked] out of sadness" during the chorus, adding that the lyrics "Hope the guilt will dim and fade / A fire baptism engulfs my shame" emphasize her discouragement. Jon Caramanica from The New York Times shared a similar sentiment, stating that its lyrics "are darker than Ms. Ferreira's usual mood." "Lost in My Bedroom" is an uptempo electropop song that was deemed largely reminiscent of her earlier material. Caramanica felt that it sounded like an "outtake" from the soundtrack for the 1984 film Sixteen Candles.

The title track "Ghost" presents similar lyrical content and production as the opening track, although it is differentiated by its subtle use of background electric guitars; Marvilli opined that "synths sparkle against Ferreira's sly vocals and the pulsing beat pounds away in the background." "Red Lips" was co-written by Shirley Manson, and was compared to material recorded by her band Garbage; Ferreira delivers "breathy" vocals with a "no-BS attitude" against a "distorted electric guitar gliding over battering drums". The fifth and final track "Everything Is Embarrassing" was described as "moving firmly into New Wave territory" Ferreira's vocals were noted as being "crisp and smooth", while the inclusion of "propelling percussion [and] deep-tuned piano chords" generated comparisons to music from the 1980s. Caramanica described its production as "sly, lush postdisco seduction".

== Singles ==
"Red Lips" was released as the lead single from the EP in the United States and Canada on July 17, 2012. It received generally favorable reviews from music critics, who appreciated its incorporation of grunge music elements An accompanying music video for the track was directed by Terry Richardson, and had premiered through Richardson's YouTube channel the previous month on June 12, 2012; the music video was later uploaded to Ferreira's Vevo channel on July 13. The clip sees Ferreira, dressed in underwear, applying lipstick on her entire face, and is interspersed with footage of its co-star, the spider "Toby the Tarantula", crawling across her body. Tara Aquino suggested that the visuals developed an increasingly risqué image for Ferreira, who responded by stating that her wardrobe was intended to complement the simplistic nature of the music video rather than an attempt to create sex appeal.

"Everything Is Embarrassing" premiered via Pitchfork on August 30, 2012, along with the announcement of Ghost's release; it would later be issued as a single on April 14 of the following year in the UK and Ireland, where Ghost had not been released. It received critical acclaim from music critics, and was largely recognized as the standout track from the extended play. Katherine St. Asaph felt that the track was Ferreira's "breakout moment", while Jon Caramanica from The New York Times described it as "one of the year's unlikely pop gems". As of July 2013, the track had sold 19,000 digital downloads in the United States.

Capitol Records requested that an accompanying music video for "Everything Is Embarrassing" with no budget be filmed following the track's online premiere; it was directed by Grant Singer, who had previously directed the clips for "Sad Dream" and "Lost in My Bedroom", and was filmed in one day in Los Angeles since Ferreira was scheduled to depart for New York City shortly after. It was premiered through Pitchfork on October 1, 2012; the black-and-white clip sees Ferreira singing in various locations throughout the city, including a playground and the roof of the Capitol Records Building. In her debut television performance, she performed the track on Late Night with Jimmy Fallon on January 7, 2013.

== Critical reception ==
Professional ratings
Aggregate scores
Source	Rating
Metacritic	62/100
Review scores
Source	Rating
Consequence of Sound	3/5 stars
No Ripcord	6/10
Now	3/5
Pitchfork	7.0/10

Ghost received mixed to positive reviews from music critics. At Metacritic, which assigns a normalized rating out of 100 to reviews from mainstream critics, the album received an average score of 62, which indicates "generally favorable reviews", based on six reviews. Writing for Pitchfork, Katherine St. Asaph provided a favorable review, placing particular praise on the "versatility" and "empathy" expressed in the tracks' lyrics. Kevin Ritchie from Now appreciated the "diverse" nature of the record, commenting that the "lightness and unobtrusiveness" incorporated throughout suggested that Ferreira had yet to display "even more untapped potential".

In a more mixed review, Jon Caramanica from The New York Times implied that Ghost lacked artistic cohesion. Despite remaining indifferent to the tracks individually, he opined that they were underwhelming when accompanied by "Everything Is Embarrassing", and elaborated that the record was "just another round of throwing ideas at the wall." A writer from No Ripcord shared a similar sentiment, stating that the "identity crisis" seemingly displayed in As If! and Ghost overshadowed the "significant improvement" seen in the later project. Writing for Consequence of Sound, Tony Hardy was also critical of the significant musical diversity incorporated throughout the extended play, sarcastically referring to it as being "interesting".

== Commercial performance ==
Ghost peaked at numbers eight and 71 on the US Billboard Top Heatseekers and Alternative Albums charts, respectively.

== Track listing ==
No.	Title	Writer(s)	Producer(s)	Length
1.	"Sad Dream"	Sky Ferreira; Blake Mills; Cass McCombs	Mills	3:33
2.	"Lost in My Bedroom"	Ferreira; Ariel Rechtshaid; Justin Raisen; Daniel Nigro	Rechtshaid	3:13
3.	"Ghost"	Ferreira; Jon Brion	Brion	5:27
4.	"Red Lips"	Shirley Manson; Greg Kurstin	Kurstin	2:21
5.	"Everything Is Embarrassing"	Ferreira; Rechtshaid; Devonté Hynes	Rechtshaid; Blood Orange^{[a]}	4:09
Total length:				18:41

Notes

- ^{^[a]} signifies a co-producer

== Personnel ==
Credits adapted from the liner notes of the limited edition of Night Time, My Time.

- Sky Ferreira – vocals
- Blake Mills – production (track 1)
- Jake Sinclair – recording (track 1)
- Greg Koller – mixing (tracks 1, 3); recording (track 3)
- Alan Yoshida – mastering (tracks 1, 3)
- Ariel Rechtshaid – production, recording, additional vocals, guitar, keyboards (tracks 2, 5)
- Dan Nigro – additional vocals (track 2)
- Justin Raisen – additional vocals, keyboards (track 2)
- Matt Popieluch – additional vocals (track 2)
- Matt Chamberlain – drums (track 2)
- Rich Costey – mixing (tracks 2, 4, 5)
- Kevin Bartley – mastering (tracks 2, 5)
- Chris Kasych – Pro Tools engineer (tracks 2, 4, 5)
- Mark Santangelo – assistance (tracks 2, 4, 5)
- Jon Brion – production (track 3)
- Jake Gorski – assistance (track 3)
- Chandler Harrod – assistance (track 3)
- Eric Cadieux – Pro Tools engineer (track 3)
- Greg Kurstin – production, keyboards, programming, guitar, bass, recording, engineering (track 4)
- Jesse Shatkin – additional engineering (track 4)
- Vlado Meller – mastering (track 4)
- Blood Orange – co-production, keyboards (track 5)
- Nick Rowe – editor (track 5)
- Hedi Slimane – photography

== Charts ==
Chart (2012–13)	Peak position
US Top Alternative Albums (Billboard)	71
US Heatseekers Albums (Billboard)	8

== Release history ==
Region	Date	Format	Label	Ref.
Canada	October 16, 2012	Digital download	Capitol	
United States	October 16, 2012	Digital download; CD	Capitol	
United States	November 15, 2025	Vinyl	Capitol	
