= Sky Ferreira =

American singer-songwriter, model, and actress (born 1992)

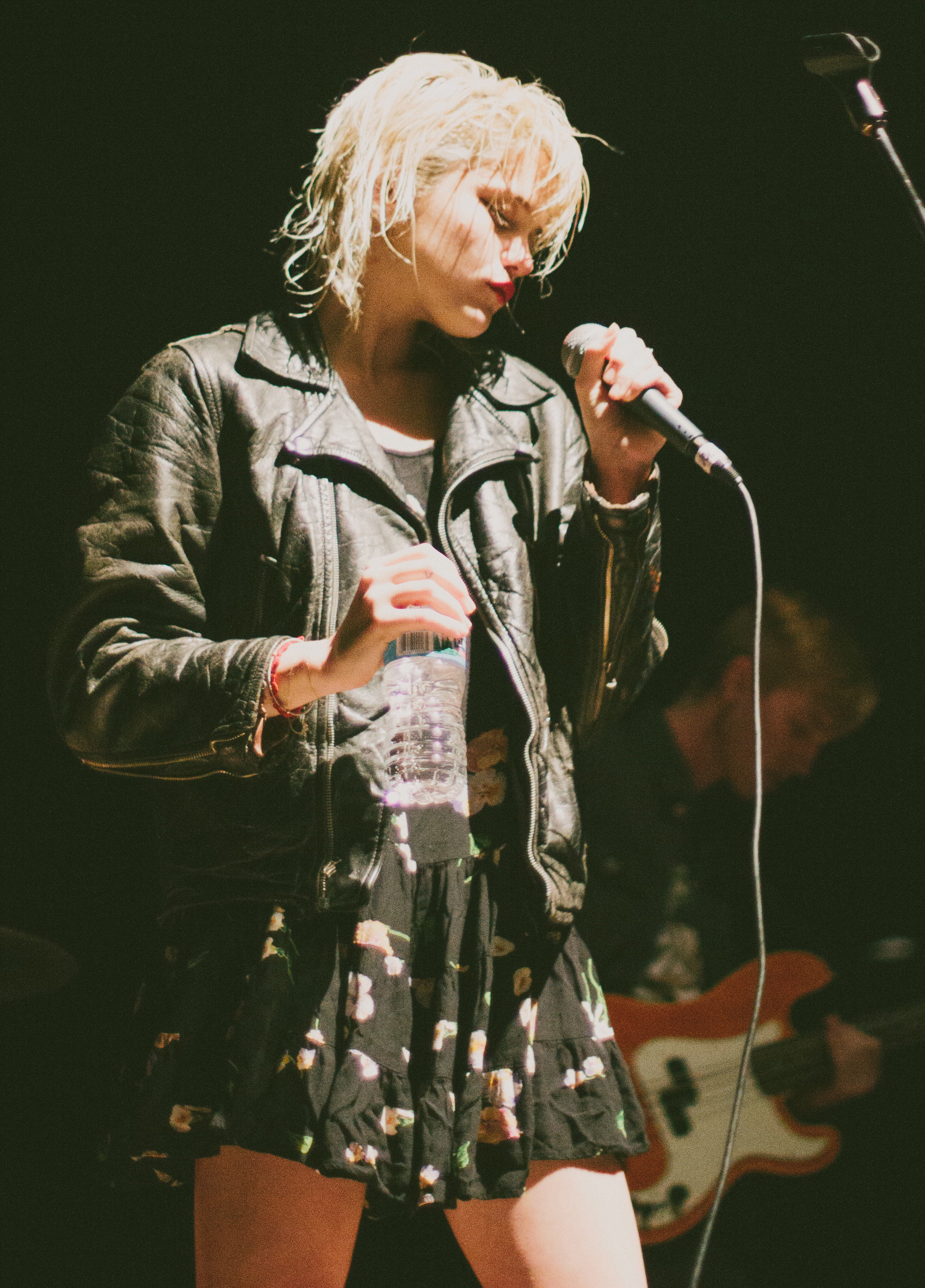
- Ferreira performing at The Pageant in St. Louis, Missouri, September 2013
- Born: Sky Tonia Ferreira; July 8, 1992 (age 34); Los Angeles, California, U.S.
- Occupations: Singer; songwriter; model; actress
- Known for: Discography; songs
- Modeling information
- Height: 5 ft 6 in (1.68 m)
- Hair color: Dark brown
- Eye color: Green
- Agency: Women Management
- Musical career
- Genres: Synth-pop; indie rock; dance-pop; indie pop
- Instrument: Vocals
- Years active: 2009–present
- Labels: Parlophone; Capitol; Polydor

Sky Tonia Ferreira (/fəˈrɛərə/ fə-RAIR-ə; born July 8, 1992) is an American singer-songwriter, model, and actress. As a teenager, Ferreira began uploading videos on Myspace of herself singing songs she had written, which led to her discovery by producers Bloodshy & Avant and a recording contract with Parlophone in 2009. She released her first extended play, As If!, in 2011, which combined elements of electropop and dance music. Ferreira's second EP, Ghost (2012), however, incorporated pop with more stripped-down song structures and featured collaborations with Jon Brion and Shirley Manson, as well as the critically acclaimed track "Everything Is Embarrassing", which she composed with Dev Hynes.

After multiple delays and disputes with her record label, Ferreira's debut studio album, Night Time, My Time, was released in October 2013, preceded by the lead single, "You're Not the One", and marked a departure from her former style, incorporating more experimental indie rock with synth-pop elements. The album received critical acclaim. That year, she ventured into acting with her appearance in Eli Roth's The Green Inferno. While appearing in films and other projects, she released "Downhill Lullaby" and "Don't Forget" as singles from her upcoming second studio album, Masochism, in March 2019 and May 2022, respectively.

Ferreira's earlier work incorporated elements of dance-pop, while her recent projects experiment with acoustic, new wave and primarily indie rock musical styles. Her lyrical content originally incorporated themes of rebellion and teenage romance, and has since evolved to discuss personal insecurities and more mature romantic themes. Outside her work in the entertainment industry, she has worked as a fashion model.

== Early life ==
Sky Tonia Ferreira was born on July 8, 1992, in Venice, Los Angeles. Her ancestry is Native American, Brazilian, and Portuguese. She has one brother.

Ferreira's mother was a house cleaner, and her father sold items at Venice Beach. Ferreira was largely raised by her grandmother, who had been Michael Jackson's personal hairstylist for over 30 years. Ferreira has said: "I was raised around him, I always saw him [and] had holidays with him and stuff like that", adding that she was unaware of his fame until she was 13 years old. Ferreira expressed interest in singing as a child and, with Jackson's encouragement, her grandmother enrolled her in opera lessons.

Ferreira has said she was sexually assaulted in her adolescence twice, first by a neighbor, and second by a stranger who had broken into her home. In an interview with Rookie, Ferreira said: "I've never said anything [about this publicly] because I don't want it to define me, but I feel like it's appropriate to say something [here]. People feel like it defines you, and it doesn't. It's really unfortunate and disgusting and traumatizing, but it doesn't make you who you are." Ferreira dropped out of high school after her sophomore year.

== Career ==
Ferreira began maintaining a Myspace profile where she uploaded demo versions of self-written tracks. Shortly before her 15th birthday, she wrote a letter to producers Bloodshy & Avant requesting that they offer her a recording contract, which she says happened "kind of right off the bat" after they came across her profile. In 2009, she was signed to Parlophone, and began finalizing the debut studio album that she says was first begun when she was 14 years old. In 2010, she entered the film and modeling industries after starring in the independent film Putty Hill and appearing in the magazines Dazed and Interview.

=== 2011–2012: As If! and Ghost ===
After releasing the tracks "17" and "One", the latter peaking at number 64 on the UK Singles Chart, Ferreira announced that her debut studio album would be released on January 11, 2011. Its lead single "Obsession" peaked at number 37 on the US Billboard Hot Dance Club Songs chart. These plans never came to fruition, and were substituted for the extended play (EP) As If! and its lead single "Sex Rules" that March. A writer for MuuMuse spoke favorably of her "vocal and musical versatility" and commended the project as a "rock solid 5-track collection of next-level crunchy pop cuts." During this time, Ferreira was featured in the advertising campaign for the Calvin Klein "CK One" product line alongside Cassie Ventura. In 2012, she was photographed by Ellen von Unwerth for the cover of Vs., and appeared in the Adidas "Originals" commercial with rappers Big Sean and Snoop Dogg.

In November 2011, Ferreira announced that her debut studio album would be released in 2012, with a lead single planned to precede its release that February. She was later revealed to have been working with Jon Brion, Greg Kurstin, and Shirley Manson on the project. In early 2012, Ferreira revealed Wild at Heart as the title of her record, and confirmed "24 Hours" and "Swamp Girl" for its track listing. "Lost in My Bedroom", described by Ferreira as "the most electro pop [song] on the album", surfaced online that March. After releasing the video for the track "Red Lips" in June, she said she had renamed the record I'm Not Alright.

With her debut studio album still unreleased, Ferreira announced that her second extended play, Ghost, would be released in October. It respectively peaked at numbers 8 and 71 on the US Billboard Top Heatseekers and Alternative Albums component charts to the Billboard 200. Katherine St. Asaph of Pitchfork called its second single, "Everything Is Embarrassing", the track where Ferreira "could well have her breakout moment", complimenting it for beginning with "snappy, crisply sung dance-pop about long-awaited moments" and transitioning into "what should be a buoyant chorus". In her debut television performance, Ferreira performed the track on Late Night with Jimmy Fallon in January 2013. The previously leaked track "Lost in My Bedroom" was included on Ghost, and was featured on an episode of ABC's Grey's Anatomy in December.

=== 2013–2018: Night Time, My Time, touring, and acting roles ===
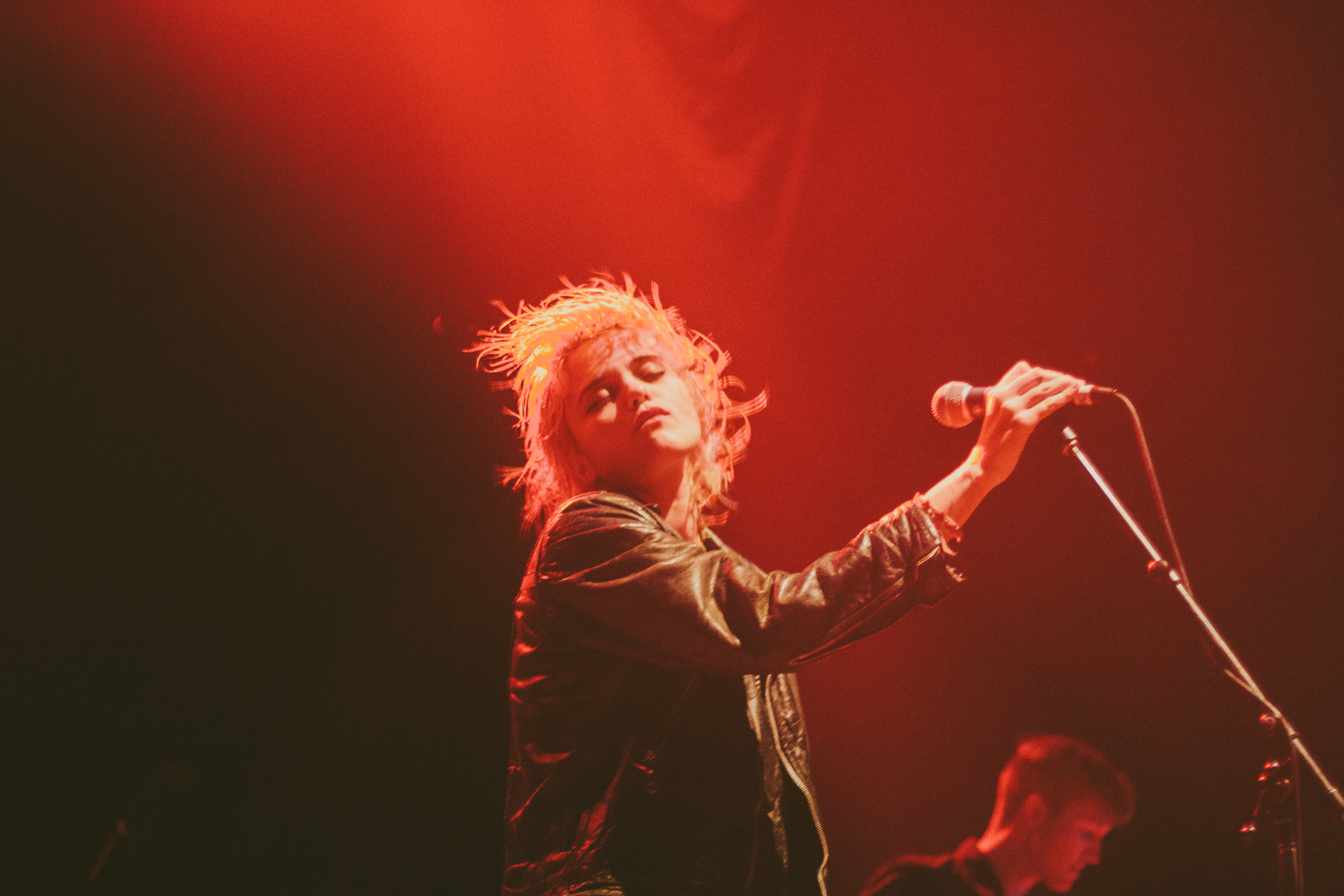
Ferreira performing at The Pageant in St. Louis in 2013

In June 2013, Ferreira starred in the short film IRL, which has been called "an eye-opening look into the reality of young life in New York". That month, she renamed her debut studio album, I Will, and said it would be released "later this summer". She noted that it would be composed of "ten up-tempo songs, all still pretty electronic, although for some reason it comes across more pop-rocky live." It was again renamed Night Time, My Time, and announced to be released on October 29, 2013, by Capitol Records. Upon its release, it received favorable reviews from music critics; at Metacritic, which assigns a normalized rating out of 100 to reviews from mainstream critics, the album received an average score of 79, which indicates "generally favorable reviews", based on 30 reviews. Rolling Stone listed it as the fifth-best debut album of 2013, noting its potent blending of synth-pop elements with a more grunge-inspired indie rock sound. The album was also listed as the 25th best overall album of the year by Complex. The record debuted at number 45 on the US Billboard 200. "You're Not the One" was released as the lead single from Night Time, My Time on September 24, 2013.

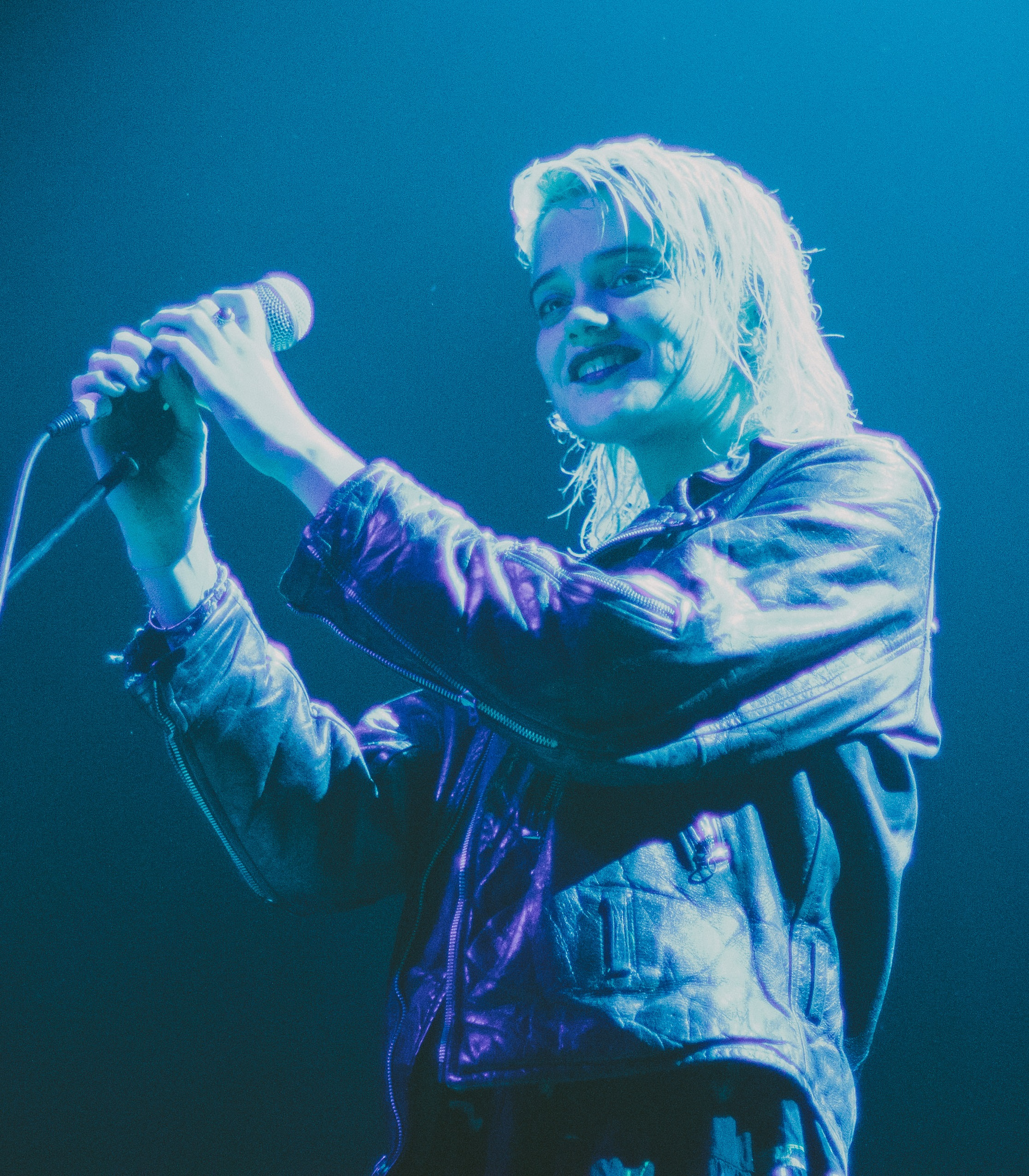
Ferreira performing in 2013

In September, Ferreira starred in the independent film The Green Inferno. In the early morning of September 14, she and her boyfriend, DIIV frontman Zachary Cole Smith, were arrested at a traffic stop in Saugerties, New York, for drug possession. Ferreira, who was in possession of ecstasy tablets, was arrested on drug possession and resisting arrest; Smith was in possession of heroin. She bailed herself out. In October, Ferreira canceled the final week of her tour with Vampire Weekend after sustaining a hemorrhage to her vocal cords, which she later said was caused by a vocal node that was repeatedly misdiagnosed as laryngitis. In November, Ferreira and Icona Pop were announced as the opening acts for Miley Cyrus's Bangerz Tour, which began on February 14, 2014. Later that month, she released her third extended play, Night Time, My Time: B-Sides Part 1. In December, Ferreira was announced as the spokeswoman for hair care brand Redken. She subsequently appeared as a guest vocalist with Ariel Pink on his track "My Molly", which was released as a music video on December 23 of that year.

On February 20, 2014, during the third performance opening for the Bangerz Tour, Ferreira fell and split open her shin onstage. After completing the performance, she was taken by ambulance to an Anaheim hospital and treated with 60 stitches. As a result, she had to temporarily pull out of support for the tour, but she soon returned. On November 20, 2014, on her North American tour, Ferreira debuted the track "Guardian".

On July 16, 2014, Ferreira announced on Twitter that she was working on her second album. She called its sound "more aggressive" and worked with Ariel Rechtshaid and Justin Raisen, with whom she produced Night Time, My Time, as well as Bobby Gillespie and Andrew Innes of Scottish band Primal Scream. Ferreira also expressed the wish to collaborate with Gesaffelstein. She also appeared in the 2016 comedy-drama film Elvis & Nixon, directed by Liza Johnson, and The Trust, which stars Nicolas Cage and Elijah Wood, and is directed by Benjamin and Alex Brewer.

Ferreira confirmed on April 7, 2015, that her second studio album would be titled Masochism. On May 12, 2015, she announced that she would release a film co-written and directed by her frequent collaborator Grant Singer accompanied by a new single, with the album to be released later in the year. Jimmy Choo revealed on June 4 that Ferreira would be the face of its newest fragrance, Illicit. She collaborated with Primal Scream on the song "Where the Light Gets In", which was released on February 1, 2016, as the lead single from the band's eleventh studio album, Chaosmosis. It was announced on April 25, 2016, that Ferreira would guest-star in the 2017 sequel to David Lynch's 1990s television series Twin Peaks. In October 2016, she was cast in Jonas Åkerlund's film Lords of Chaos, based on the 1998 book of the same name by Michael Moynihan and Didrik Søderlind. She appeared in Playboy in October 2016, with the photo shoot serving as a "visual introduction" to her next album. Ferreira appeared in Edgar Wright's 2017 heist film Baby Driver, portraying the mother of lead character Baby (played by Ansel Elgort). She also contributed a cover of the Commodores song "Easy" to the film's soundtrack, produced by Nigel Godrich.

In 2018, she said: "I would just like to clarify for some: My silence should not be confused for negligence, I deeply care and put everything I have into my music. Including all of my earnings. I won't put out something that I don't stand by or the bare minimum."

=== 2019–present: Return to music ===
On March 21, 2019, Ferreira announced the single "Downhill Lullaby", which was released on March 27. In July, she debuted a song "Descending" during Pitchfork Music Festival. She collaborated with Charli XCX on her promotional single "Cross You Out" released in August. On December 19, 2021, Ferreira stated that Masochism would be "actually coming out" in 2022.

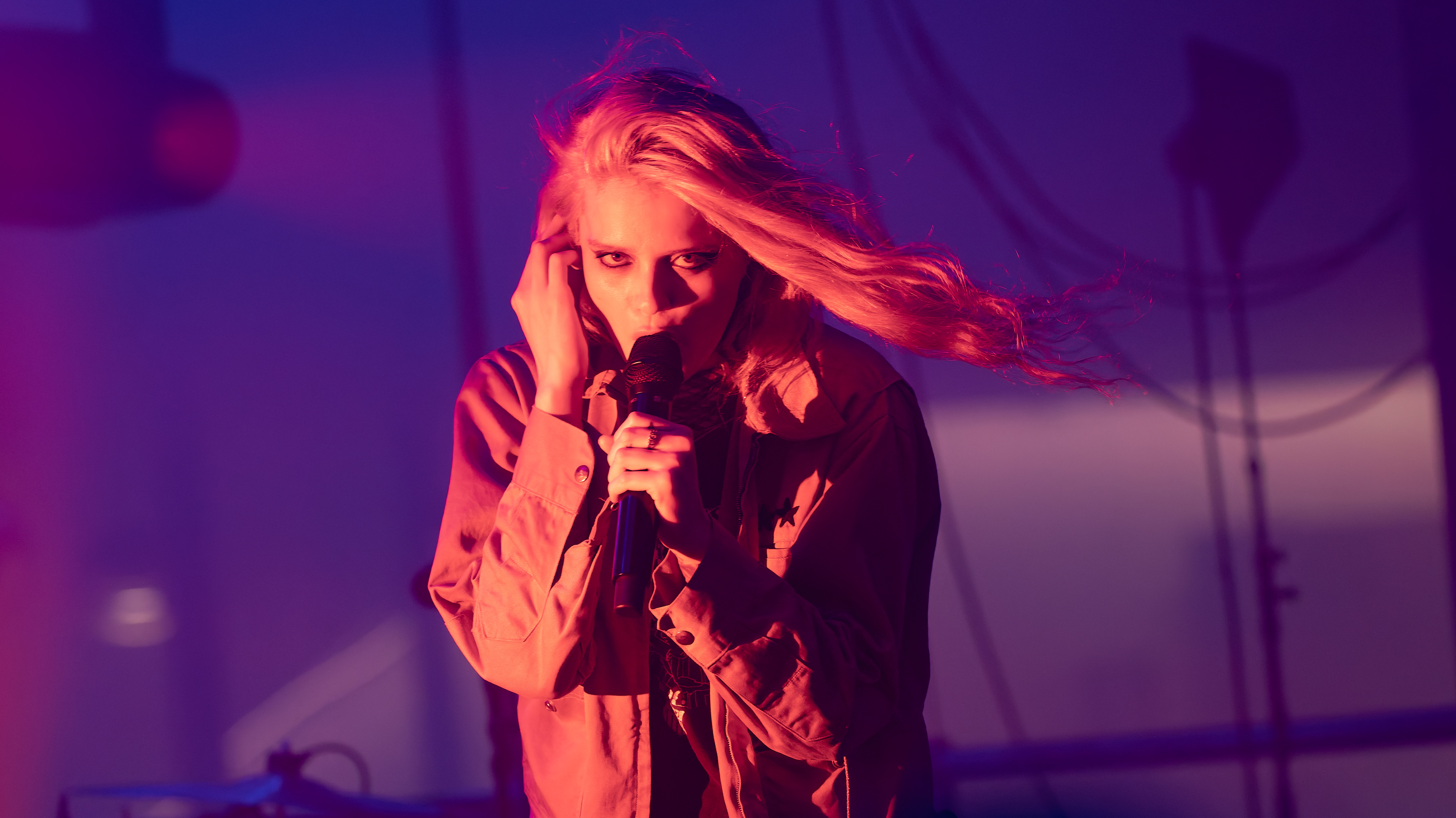
Ferreira performing at the Queen Elizabeth Hall Lobby in 2022

In March 2022 she released an 18-second-long teaser of Masochism's second single, titled "Don't Forget", which was then released on May 25.

On December 2, 2024, Ferreira announced the release of "Leash", a song written and co-produced by her for the soundtrack of Halina Reijn's sophomore feature film, Babygirl. Additionally, the singer expressed her intentions to tour live and act more throughout 2025. On December 5, "Leash" was released, and Ferreira stated that Masochism will be released in 2025.

==== Free Sky Ferreira Movement ====
In 2021, when Masochism failed to materialize, the singer hinted at being sabotaged by her label, claiming Capitol Records had been withholding the release of the album and music videos. In response, fans of Ferreira launched the Free Sky Ferreira campaign, emulating the Free Fiona campaign launched by fans of Fiona Apple demanding Epic Records allow Apple to release her third album, Extraordinary Machine. The movement originally existed primarily online, with fans using the hashtag "#FreeSkyFerreira" to raise awareness of Ferreira's purported issues with Capitol.

In 2023, after the release of "Don't Forget", it became clear that Masochism once again would not be released. As a reaction, in August of 2023, fans of Ferreira purchased a billboard in Times Square claiming that Ferreira was being "held hostage" by her record deal. Ferreira expressed agreement with the claims made by the billboard, saying "It's true" in an Instagram story, about a post by The Fader covering the billboard.

One month later, in September, fans organized for a plane flying a banner reading "Free Sky Ferreira" to fly over the Capitol Records Building in Hollywood. In November, fans noticed that Ferreira was no longer listed on Capitol Record's roster of artists on their website. While originally Capitol declined to say whether Ferreira and the label had parted ways, Ferreira said in December of 2024 that she had indeed been dropped by Capitol Records.

== Musical style ==
Ferreira is primarily a synth-pop singer, also being described as dance-pop, indie pop, indie rock, alternative rock, and art pop. Her earlier work incorporated elements of dance-pop and electropop, most notably seen in tracks from As If! and Ghost. The latter EP also includes elements of acoustic and new wave. Her lyrical content originally incorporated themes of rebellion and teenage romance; Andrew Unterberger from Popdust opined that "17" "plays the girl-gone-wild tale as a near-horror story, clearly meant to shock and upset", while noting that "One" "instead features a robo'd out Sky bemoaning the breakdown of connection in a relationship, and her own inability to feel anything as a result." As her career progressed, Ferreira more frequently experimented with elements of indie rock, which were commonly heard in her first album, Night Time, My Time. Ferreira's vocal range has been described as that of a contralto.

Julianne Escobedo Shepberd from Rolling Stone wrote that Ferreira's "songs are catchy, but they're also thickly glazed with fuzz and synths, evoking influences like Suicide, Siouxsie Sioux and the krautrock group Harmonia". Karolina Ramos from The GW Hatchet compared Ferreira to New Zealand recording artist Lorde, both of whom she felt "tackle contemporary love, desire and insecurity with depth, composure and frankness." She compared her musical style to 1980s pop music, and noted that "her throaty, sultry vocals call to mind Lana Del Rey, abandoning brightness and vivacity for a colder tone. Still, Ferreira can drop the edge, with gentler tracks like "Sad Dream" showcasing her vocal range and seldom-observed softness." Andrew Unterberger stated that "through a variety of singles, EPs, guest features and live appearances, Sky has proven herself one of the most talented singers, creative songwriters and savvy collaborators currently working in the genre", but blamed "bad marketing, label disputes and her own perfectionism" for the extended delay of Night Time, My Time; he also stated that the repeated renaming of the record itself "should give you some idea of the musical identity issues she's suffered over the years."

Ferreira is also a feminist, which has influenced her work; she has said "I feel like I'm doing a bad job of being a feminist if I'm not making someone angry."

=== Influences ===
Ferreira has cited Michael Jackson, Madonna, Prince, Fiona Apple, the Jesus and Mary Chain, Gwen Stefani, Sonic Youth, Alice Cooper, Nancy Sinatra, Cat Power, Blondie, Hole, Elliott Smith, Kate Bush, My Bloody Valentine, Carly Simon, Françoise Hardy, and the Runaways as musical influences.

== Philanthropy ==
In July 2014, Ferreira performed at the Music Hall of Williamsburg in New York City to benefit the David Lynch Foundation. Ferreira announced that the funds raised would "go towards Transcendental Meditation (TM) programs for at-risk students; veterans with PTSD; women who are survivors of domestic violence; American Indians suffering from diabetes; the homeless and incarcerate." Of her own practice she said, "TM sort of saved my life."

In support of the Dakota Access Pipeline protests, Ferreira performed at a benefit concert titled We Rock with Standing Rock in December 2016.

== Awards ==
Year	Awards	Work	Category	Result	Ref.
2012	Rober Awards Music Prize	Herself	Most Promising New Vocalist	Nominated	
2014	Rober Awards Music Prize	"My Molly"	Best Cover Version	Nominated	
2014	Webby Awards	"You're Not the One"	Best Music Video	Won	

== Discography ==
- Night Time, My Time (2013)
- Masochism (TBA)

== Filmography ==
Film
Year	Title	Role	Notes	Ref.
2010	Putty Hill	Jenny		
2011	The Wrong Ferarri	Herself	Cameo appearance	
2013	IRL	Angel	Short film	
2013	The Green Inferno	Kaycee		
2016	The Trust	The Woman		
2016	Elvis & Nixon	Charlotte		
2017	Baby Driver	Baby's mom		
2018	Lords of Chaos	Ann-Marit		
2018	American Woman	Bridget Callahan		
2022	Alone at Night	Stacy		
2023	Reptile	Renee		
2025	Maddie's Secret	Deena's girlfriend	Cameo	

Television
Year	Title	Role	Notes	Ref.
2017	Twin Peaks: The Return	Ella	Episode: "Part 9"	
2020	The Twilight Zone	Fiji	Episode: "Ovation"	

== Tours ==
Headlining

- Night Time, My Time Tour (2013)

Supporting

- Vampire Weekend – Modern Vampires Tour (2013)
- Miley Cyrus – Bangerz Tour (2014)
- Blondie and Garbage – Rage and Rapture Tour (2017)
