= Obsession (Sky Ferreira song) =

Single by Sky Ferreira
- Released: September 14, 2010
- Studio: Germano (New York City, New York); Patriot (Denver, Colorado); Studio at the Palms (Las Vegas, Nevada)
- Genre: Electropop
- Length: 3:44
- Label: Capitol
- Songwriters: Ryan Tedder; Justin Franks; Jerrod Bettis
- Producers: DJ Frank E; Ryan Tedder; Jerrod "Skins" Bettis

Sky Ferreira singles chronology
"One" (2010)	"Obsession" (2010)	"Sex Rules" (2011)

"Obsession" is a song by American singer Sky Ferreira. The song was written and produced by Justin "DJ Frank E" Franks with OneRepublic members Ryan Tedder and Jerrod Bettis. It was released as a single on September 14, 2010, by Capitol Records. The song peaked at number 37 on Billboard's Hot Dance Club Songs chart. The accompanying music video was directed by Marc Klasfeld, and portrays Ferreira's obsession with actor Michael Madsen.

== Background and composition ==
"Obsession" was written and produced by Ryan Tedder, DJ Frank E, and Jerrod Bettis. Ferreira said of the song:

"It's kind of making fun of narcissism. It has an electronic edge, but it also has this whole Gary Glitter intro that's perfect for, say, a big hockey game."

Before its release, "Obsession" was included on Now That's What I Call Music! 35. The track has also been featured on the soundtracks to the television series The Vampire Diaries and the 2011 romantic comedy film Larry Crowne. A remix of the song by Static Revenger was included on Now That's What I Call Club Hits 2.

== Music video ==
The music video for "Obsession", directed by Marc Klasfeld, debuted on September 30, 2010, on mtvU. In the video, Ferreira has an infatuation with actor Michael Madsen. Though her friends find this ridiculous, she sets out to find Madsen and convince him to be with her. She dreams of Madsen aiding her in cutting one of her friend's hair. She eventually sneaks into Madsen's house. The last scene has the actor coming to see Ferreira and her friends in a restaurant. They both walk out after Madsen pays for the group's meal, and Ferreira's "friends" are left stunned. Throughout Ferreira's dream sequences, Madsen is dressed in a suit, and some of the video was perceived as a nod to Madsen's character Mr. Blonde from the 1992 film Reservoir Dogs.

== Track listings ==
- Digital download
1. "Obsession" – 3:44
- US promotional CD maxi single – The Remixes
1. "Obsession" (Static Revenger Remix) – 6:51
2. "Obsession" (Static Revenger Remix Instrumental) – 6:51
3. "Obsession" (Static Revenger Radio Mix) – 3:33
4. "Obsession" (Static Revenger Dub) – 6:36
5. "Obsession" (Mike Rizzo Funk Generation Club Mix) – 6:50
6. "Obsession" (Mike Rizzo Funk Generation Dub) – 6:50
7. "Obsession" (Mike Rizzo Funk Generation Radio Mix) – 3:40
8. "Obsession" (Mike Rizzo Funk Generation Radio Mix Instrumental) – 3:40
9. "Obsession" (Sam Sparro & Golden Touch Club Mix) – 4:45
10. "Obsession" (Sam Sparro & Golden Touch Dub) – 4:44
11. "Obsession" (Sam Sparro & Golden Touch Radio Mix) – 3:46

== Credits and personnel ==
Credits adapted from the liner notes of the promotional CD single.

Recording

- Recorded at Germano Studios (New York City, New York) and Patriot Studios (Denver, Colorado)
- Additional recording at Studio at the Palms (Las Vegas, Nevada)
- Mixed at 2010 Mixing (Studio City, California)
- Mastered at Capitol Mastering (Hollywood, California)

Personnel

- Sky Ferreira – vocals, background vocals
- DJ Frank E – production, recording, programming, arrangement, synth
- Ryan Tedder – production, recording, programming, arrangement, guitar, synth, background vocals
- Jerrod "Skins" Bettis – production, programming, arrangement, guitar, synth
- Christian Baker – recording assistance
- Mark Gray – additional recording
- Rob Katz – recording assistance
- Joe Zook – mixing
- Dan Piscina – mixing assistance
- Robert Vosgien – mastering

== Charts ==
Chart (2011)	Peak position
US Dance Club Songs (Billboard)	37

== Release history ==
Release dates and formats for "Obsession"
Region	Date	Format	Label(s)	Ref.
United States	October 19, 2010	Mainstream airplay	Capitol	
