= One (Sky Ferreira song) =

Single by Sky Ferreira
- Released: August 20, 2010
- Recorded: 2009
- Genre: Synth-pop; Europop
- Length: 3:33
- Label: Parlophone
- Songwriters: Sky Ferreira; Christian Karlsson; Pontus Winnberg; Magnus Lidehäll; Marit Bergman
- Producer: Bloodshy & Avant

Sky Ferreira singles chronology
"17" (2010)	"One" (2010)	"Obsession" (2010)

"One" is a song by American singer Sky Ferreira. The song was written by Ferreira, Christian Karlsson, Pontus Winnberg, Magnus Lidehäll, Marit Bergman, and Pontus Winnberg, and produced by Bloodshy & Avant. It was released as a single on August 20, 2010.

== Composition ==
"One" is a synth-pop and Europop song. It was written by Ferreira and Marit Bergman in less than 30 minutes, and was produced by Bloodshy & Avant, who were responsible for some of Britney Spears' singles such as "Toxic", "Piece of Me", and "Radar". Ferreira stated the song is about "being numb and wanting to feel love, happiness, sadness—anything, really. It's kind of like the Tin Man wanting a heart." In an interview with Digital Spy, Ferreira elaborated on the meaning behind "One":

"It's about that point where you don't feel anything—you don't feel happy, you don't feel sad but you want to feel something. It's a situation I was in and I think everyone's been in. There's always someone in a relationship who wants more attention and starts trying too hard to please the other person. The thing is, the more you try to please that person, the less effort they make because they know you'll do anything they want. It's that stage I'm singing about on 'One'."

== Commercial performance ==
"One" entered the UK Singles Chart at number 64 for the week of August 29, 2010.

== Music video ==
The music video, directed by photographer Rankin, was released to Parlophone's YouTube channel on July 2, 2010. It consists mostly of close-ups of Ferreira in a red outfit on a flashing floor, singing into a shadeless lamp in a white room, jumping in slow motion, and pulling on a white parachute.

== Track listing ==
- Digital EP
1. "One" – 3:33
2. "One" (Logistics Remix) – 4:58
3. "One" (BAR9 Remix) – 5:33
4. "One" (Totally Enormous Extinct Dinosaurs Remix) – 4:32
5. "One" (Style of Eye Remix) – 8:13
6. "One" (video) – 3:00

== Charts ==
Chart (2010)	Peak position
Scottish Singles Sales (Official Charts)	60
UK Singles (Official Charts)	64
