= It's Always Sunny in Philadelphia season 3 =

2007 season of American television series

It's Always Sunny in Philadelphia
- Season 3
- DVD cover
- Starring: Charlie Day; Glenn Howerton; Rob McElhenney; Kaitlin Olson; Danny DeVito
- No. of episodes: 15

Release
- Original network: FX
- Original release: September 13 – November 15, 2007

Season chronology
- ← Previous; Season 2 Next → Season 4

The third season of the American television sitcom series It's Always Sunny in Philadelphia premiered on FX on September 13, 2007. The season contains 15 episodes and concluded airing on November 15, 2007.

== Cast ==
=== Main cast ===
- Charlie Day as Charlie Kelly
- Glenn Howerton as Dennis Reynolds / Wendell Albright
- Rob McElhenney as Mac
- Kaitlin Olson as Deandra "Dee" Reynolds
- Danny DeVito as Frank Reynolds

=== Recurring cast ===
- Mary Elizabeth Ellis as The Waitress
- Lynne Marie Stewart as Bonnie Kelly
- Sandy Martin as Mrs. Mac
- David Hornsby as Matthew "Rickety Cricket" Mara

=== Guest stars ===
- Todd Grinnell as Sage
- Jackie Tohn as Asriel
- Lucy DeVito as Woman
- Faizon Love as Coach
- Jimmi Simpson as Liam McPoyle
- Nate Mooney as Ryan McPoyle
- Bob Rusch as Doyle McPoyle
- Thesy Surface as Margaret McPoyle
- Artemis Pebdani as Artemis
- Geoffrey Owens as Middle-Age Black Guy (McNabb Impostor)
- Stephen Collins as Bruce Mathis
- Brian Unger as Attorney
- Jose Yenque as Ernesto
- Sam Witwer as Muscular Guy
- Judy Greer as Ingrid Nelson
- Rachelle Wood as Model
- Michael Friedman as Young Cop
- Takayo Fischer as Mr. Kim
- Tania Gunadi as Sun-Li
- Richard Ruccolo as Corporate Rep
- Kyle Davis as Lil' Kevin
- Brittany Daniel as Carmen
- Gregory Scott Cummins as Luther Mac
- John Mariano as Johnny
- James Price, Jr. as Anthony
- Matt Cedeno as Rico
- Gregg Weiner as Bingo
- Joe Cortese as Sal
- Tracey Walter as Bum
- Carla Renata as Police Clerk
- Lee Weaver as Junkyard Owner
- Sklar Brothers as Fat Michael and DJ Squirrely D
- Michael Auteri as Homeless Larry
- Jeff Meacham as Robert
- Aja Evans as Gloria

== Episodes ==
No. overall	No. in season	Title	Directed by	Written by	Original release date	Prod. code	US viewers (millions)
18	1	"The Gang Finds a Dumpster Baby"	Jerry Levine	Charlie Day & Rob McElhenney	September 13, 2007	IP03001	2.34
Dee and Mac find an abandoned baby boy in a dumpster and try to look after him. Dennis, on an environmentalist kick, takes Frank and Charlie to a landfill, where they get into dumpster-diving. Dennis tries to ingratiate himself with some activists by bring them cannabis. Dee and Mac take the baby, who they have named D.B., to a modeling agency; when told a white baby is common, they try and take D.B. to a tanning salon. Frank and Charlie steal trash from across the city and fill their apartment with junk. Dennis tricks one of the activists into chaining himself to a tree overnight, then takes acid and has sex with another activist, Asriel. Frank and Charlie sleep in a dumpster. Later, Charlie's mom reveals that Charlie survived an abortion and tells him that Frank is indeed his father. Charlie becomes convinced that D.B. is Frank and the Waitress's son. Child services arrives at Paddy's for D.B.
19	2	"The Gang Gets Invincible"	Fred Savage	Charlie Day & David Hornsby & Glenn Howerton	September 13, 2007	IP03010	1.86
When the Philadelphia Eagles hold open tryouts à la the movie Invincible, Mac, Dennis, and Dee (disguised as a man) make the event their own personal competition. Frank and Charlie decide to tailgate the tryouts, where Frank takes LSD. Everyone in the tryouts gets on a bus and leaves for another field, and Frank insists they follow. On the bus, Mac and Dennis meet another McPoyle family member, Doyle, and the rest of the McPoyle family shows up next to Frank and Charlie. In the tryouts, a keynote by Donovan McNabb is given by someone else; Frank laces Charlie's beer with acid and then has trouble escaping the McPoyles's RV. Mac is tackled hard by Doyle; Dennis is knocked out by a football; and Dee is a natural at kicking. Charlie dresses up as the Green Man, his old unofficial high school mascot. Dee reveals that she is a woman and then breaks her foot on another kick. Doyle makes the second round, but Frank shoots him in the leg.
20	3	"Dennis and Dee's Mom Is Dead"	Matt Shakman	David Hornsby & Rob McElhenney	September 20, 2007	IP03013	N/A
Frank's ex-wife Barbara dies, leaving all her money to Bruce; her house is left to Dennis; and Dee receives nothing. Dennis wants to throw a house party but they have no friends to invite. Dee and Frank invite Bruce over and Frank poses as Dee's new fiancé. Mac, Charlie, and Dennis create flyers to make friends at Dennis's new house and hand them out to strangers. To expose their scheme, Bruce brings over some of his adopted children to Dee's and tells them they can live there, insists on watching Frank and Dee make love, and officiates their marriage. Only two college students show up to Dennis's house party and they are abused by Mac and Dennis.
21	4	"The Gang Gets Held Hostage"	Fred Savage	Story by : Lisa Parsons; Teleplay by : Rob McElhenney	September 20, 2007	IP03009	N/A
After Frank climbs into the air vents to find his will that Charlie hid, the McPoyles hold the rest of the Gang hostage at Paddy's. Frank gets lost in the vents. Dee starts experiencing Stockholm syndrome. The McPoyles force the Gang to destroy the bar. Charlie escapes into the vents and finds Frank. Dennis seduces the McPoyle sister. The McPoyles take Dee, Mac, and Dennis up the roof to shoot them, and Frank and Charlie appear out of the vent. The McPoyles leave revealing their guns were fake.
22	5	"The Aluminum Monster vs. Fatty Magoo"	Fred Savage	Charlie Day & Glenn Howerton	September 27, 2007	IP03007	N/A
The Gang gets involved in the fashion-design world when Dee gets jealous of her high-school best friend (Judy Greer), who is now a successful boutique owner. Meanwhile, Frank restarts his old sweatshop business and coaches Mac on how to run one.
23	6	"The Gang Solves the North Korea Situation"	Fred Savage	Charlie Day & Scott Marder & Rob Rosell	September 27, 2007	IP03006	N/A
The Gang is at odds with a more-successful Korean pub owner who bears a striking resemblance to former North Korean dictator Kim Jong-Il; Charlie becomes involved with the owner's daughter (Tania Gunadi).
24	7	"The Gang Sells Out"	Matt Shakman	Charlie Day & David Hornsby	October 4, 2007	IP03014	N/A
When a restaurant chain offers to buy Paddy's Pub, the guys try to make the deal go through by showing the rep a good time; when Dee discovers she won't benefit from the deal, she quits her job at Paddy's (again) and pressures The Waitress to get her a job at a TGI Fridays-style restaurant.
25	8	"Frank Sets Sweet Dee on Fire"	Fred Savage	Story by : Rob McElhenney; Teleplay by : Scott Marder & Rob Rosell	October 4, 2007	IP03008	N/A
The gang tries to become local celebrities by creating their own public-access news show and making it big on the hip club scene.
26	9	"Sweet Dee's Dating a Retarded Person"	Jerry Levine	Story by : Glenn Howerton; Teleplay by : Scott Marder & Rob Rosell	October 11, 2007	IP03002	N/A
Dennis tells Dee that her new amateur-rapper boyfriend is mentally disabled; Frank, Charlie, and Mac start their own band but can't decide what type of music to play, especially when Charlie pens a disturbing song about being sexually molested by a strange creature called The Night Man.
27	10	"Mac Is a Serial Killer"	Jerry Levine	Story by : Charlie Day; Teleplay by : David Hornsby	October 18, 2007	IP03003	N/A
Half of the Gang suspects that Mac might be the serial killer who's been terrorizing young women, especially when they notice how distant he's become; the other half tries to catch the serial killer themselves; meanwhile, Mac himself renews his relationship with Carmen (Brittany Daniel), the transgender woman from "Charlie Has Cancer".
28	11	"Dennis Looks Like a Registered Sex Offender"	Jerry Levine	Rob McElhenney	October 25, 2007	IP03005	N/A
Dennis' life goes downhill when the community mistakes him for a convicted child molester released from prison because of overcrowding; Mac and Charlie reunite with Luther (Mac's convict father) and freak out when they think Luther is murdering the people who put him in prison.
29	12	"The Gang Gets Whacked"	Matt Shakman	Glenn Howerton & Scott Marder & Rob Rosell	November 1, 2007	IP03011	N/A
When The Gang finds cocaine in a pair of speakers, they decide to sell it, only to learn that the cocaine belonged to some local mobsters who want it back. To pay off the debt, they buy more drugs and try to sell them at the country club.
30	13	"The Gang Gets Whacked Part 2"	Matt Shakman	Scott Marder & Rob Rosell	November 1, 2007	IP03012	N/A
The Gang must find a way to avoid getting "whacked off" when their plans to pay off mob members for missing cocaine go wrong: Frank pimps out Dennis to older women; Mac tries to do grunt work for the mob; and Charlie and Dee stick to the plan to sell drugs but use them all themselves.
31	14	"Bums: Making a Mess All Over the City"	Jerry Levine	Charlie Day & David Hornsby	November 8, 2007	IP03004	N/A
Mac and Dee become vigilantes to solve the homeless problem. Meanwhile, after buying a junkyard police car to scare the homeless away from the bar, Frank and Dennis dress in police costumes and abuse the public while Charlie dresses as Serpico and tries to expose them.
32	15	"The Gang Dances Their Asses Off"	Matt Shakman	David Hornsby & Scott Marder & Rob Rosell	November 15, 2007	IP03015	0.99
Charlie inadvertently puts Paddy's Pub up as the grand prize in a radio dance marathon (in Mac's words to Charlie: "Your illiteracy has screwed us again"), so the gang must win the competition—against the enemies they've made so far in the series—to keep the bar.

== Reception ==
The third season received positive reviews. On Rotten Tomatoes, it has an approval rating of 90% with an average score of 8 out of 10 based on 20 reviews. The website's critical consensus reads, "It's Always Sunny solidifies into a broader comedy during its third season, with the Gang coming into their own worst selves and the fictionalized Philadelphia they inhabit taking on a kooky life of its own."

== Home media ==
It's Always Sunny in Philadelphia: Season 3
Set details	Special features
15 episodes; 3-disc DVD set (Region 1 & 4); Technical specifications: Full Frame (1.33:1); English Dolby Surround; English, French, and Spanish subtitles	Two audio commentaries; "The Gang Solves the North Korea Situation" "Dennis Looks Like a Registered Sex Offender": Three featurettes: Sunny Side Up Volume 2 Meet the McPoyles Dancing Guy: Gag reel; Season 3 TV spots
Release dates
Region 1	Region 4
September 9, 2008	March 9, 2011
