= It's Always Sunny in Philadelphia season 2 =

2006 season of American television series

It's Always Sunny in Philadelphia
- Season 2
- DVD cover
- Starring: Charlie Day; Glenn Howerton; Rob McElhenney; Kaitlin Olson; Danny DeVito
- No. of episodes: 10

Release
- Original network: FX
- Original release: June 29 – August 17, 2006

Season chronology
- ← Previous; Season 1 Next → Season 3

The second season of the American television sitcom series It's Always Sunny in Philadelphia premiered on FX on June 29, 2006. The season contains 10 episodes and concluded airing on August 17, 2006.

== Production ==
The series' second season introduces veteran actor Danny DeVito portraying Dennis and Dee's father Frank, who moves in with temporary wheelchair user Charlie following a car accident, and blackmails his way into the group. Before production of the second season began, series creator Rob McElhenney found out that DeVito was a fan of the show and a friend of FX president, John Landgraf. McElhenney asked Landgraf to set up a meeting. McElhenney met DeVito at his home and pitched DeVito's character, Frank Reynolds. DeVito agreed to star in the show, but was only available for twenty days. To have Frank Reynolds in all ten episodes of the second season, all of DeVito's scenes were filmed before filming the remainder of the season.

== Cast ==
=== Main cast ===
- Charlie Day as Charlie Kelly
- Glenn Howerton as Dennis Reynolds
- Rob McElhenney as Mac
- Kaitlin Olson as Deandra "Dee" Reynolds
- Danny DeVito as Frank Reynolds

=== Recurring cast ===
- Mary Elizabeth Ellis as The Waitress
- Anne Archer as Barbara Reynolds
- Lynne Marie Stewart as Mrs. Kelly

=== Guest stars ===
- Kristoffer Polaha as Male Employee
- Natasha Leggero as Stripper #1
- Sara Erikson as Stripper #2
- Tiffany Haddish as Stripper #3
- Josh Stamberg as Ari Frenkel
- Joanna Sanchez as Maria
- Eddie Pepitone as Tony
- Aisha Hinds as Caseworker
- Lucy DeVito as Jenny
- Marcia Ann Burrs as Angie
- Sandy Martin as Mrs. Mac
- Eddie Mekka as Bobby Thunderson
- Jessie Ward as Brianna
- Jason Van Over as Rough Dude
- Katie Kreisler as Shady Woman
- Patrick Hallahan as AA Director
- Bill H. McKenzie as Rick (Rec Center)
- David Hornsby as Father Matthew Mara
- John Rosenfeld as Morris
- Dona Hardy as Old Woman
- Damian Young as Jack Stanford
- Jimmi Simpson as Liam McPoyle
- Nate Mooney as Ryan McPoyle
- Carla Alapont as Cute Girl #1
- Sabrina Machado as Cute Girl #2
- Artemis Pebdani as Artemis
- Gregory Scott Cummins as Luther Mac
- Stephen Collins as Bruce Mathis

== Episodes ==
No. overall	No. in season	Title	Directed by	Written by	Original release date	Prod. code	US viewers (millions)
8	1	"Charlie Gets Crippled"	Rob McElhenney	Story by : Charlie Day & Glenn Howerton & Rob McElhenney; Teleplay by : Rob McElhenney	June 29, 2006	IP02001	1.64
Dennis and Dee's father Frank (Danny DeVito) abruptly appears, scaring Dennis, who accidentally runs over Charlie with his car. Frank tells Dee and Dennis that he is divorcing their mother and giving away all his money so he can spend more time with them; they storm off and rob his house. Frank, Mac, and Charlie go to a strip club where Charlie, in a wheelchair, gets free lapdances from strippers. The five return to Charlie's before leaving Frank with the two strippers; Frank decides he wants to move in with Charlie and offers to pay his rent. Mac and Dennis get their own wheelchairs and try to pick up women at the mall, but Dee is already there in a body brace and crutches. Charlie impersonates a disabled veteran and returns with Frank to a strip club before they are kicked out. Mac and Dennis drive drunk to the strip club and hit Dee and Frank with their car, injuring everyone.
9	2	"The Gang Goes Jihad"	Dan Attias	Story by : Charlie Day & Glenn Howerton & Rob McElhenney; Teleplay by : Rob McElhenney	June 29, 2006	IP02002	1.50
An Israeli businessman buys a neighboring property of the bar, the floor-layout of which actually includes half of Paddy's Pub, and tells the Gang they have a week to vacate. A lawyer tells them they have no recourse, prompting the Gang to go to extremes to get the man to leave. Frank fights with his ex-wife Barbara over the possessions she got in their divorce, and she begins dating the Israeli businessman. Mac, Charlie, and Dennis TP the building next to Paddy's, while Frank and Dee steal Barbara's dog. Mac, Dennis, and Charlie record a threatening "jihad video" but decide not to use it. Charlie takes the tape with him as he throws a flaming bag of poop into the adjacent property which causes a large explosion. Frank reveals he has purchased the property. The police recover the jihad video.
10	3	"Dennis and Dee Go on Welfare"	Dan Attias	Story by : Charlie Day & Glenn Howerton & Rob McElhenney; Teleplay by : Rob McElhenney	July 6, 2006	IP02004	N/A
Dennis and Dee quit their jobs to pursue their dreams, but when Mac reminds them that unemployment eventually runs out, Dennis and Dee get hooked on crack cocaine so they can apply for welfare. Meanwhile, Frank hires two new workers under the "Work for Welfare" program, and Charlie and Mac go on a spending spree with the money in Frank's new secret bank account. Frank also tries to bond with Charlie and Mac. On their spending spree, Charlie and Mac encounter Dee and Dennis, who are strung out on the street. After Frank cuts off the secret account, Charlie and Mac are unable to pay the prostitutes they hired. Dennis and Dee go into withdrawal. Frank is impressed that Charlie stole his money and promotes him.
11	4	"Mac Bangs Dennis' Mom"	Dan Attias	Charlie Day & Glenn Howerton	July 6, 2006	IP02005	N/A
When Mac is asked to fetch Frank's toupee from his ex-wife Barbara, she comes onto Mac. Dennis and Dee are frustrated that they have to do "Charlie work" at Paddy's. Dennis asks the Waitress on a date and tells Charlie he will sleep with her unless Charlie agrees do resume "Charlie work". Frank goes on a date with an old flame, Angie. On their own date, Dennis tells the Waitress he loves her to keep her interested. After Mac has sex with Barbara, they kiss and he leaves. Charlie and Dennis are watching outside, and Charlie suggests that Dennis sleep with Mac's mom. Dennis hits on Mac's mother but she rejects his advances; Dee and the Waitress are watching outside, having been tipped off by Charlie. Dee tells Dennis that Charlie is forcing her to sleep with him, and encourages Dennis to sleep with Charlie's mom. Dee and the Waitress are watching outside again, and Dee suggests that she sleep with Charlie as revenge. Barbara reveals she only slept with Mac to upset Frank; Dennis is watching outside and they get into a fight. The Waitress sleeps with Frank to get back at Dennis, and Charlie is distraught at what he has caused.
12	5	"Hundred Dollar Baby"	Dan Attias	Charlie Day & Glenn Howerton & Rob McElhenney	July 13, 2006	IP02007	N/A
When the Gang gets mugged, everyone runs away leaving Dee alone with the robber. When she starts taking self-defense classes, Frank offers to train her. They go to a gym and encounter one of Frank's old friends Bobby, whose daughter Brianna (Jessie Ward) is a boxer. Dennis and Mac train Charlie for an underground fighting ring to make money off him. A woman at the gym gives Dee some performance enhancing supplements. Mac, Dennis, and Charlie get drunk and they beat Charlie as training. Dee's supplements make her more aggressive and she and Brianna agree to fight. Charlie finds the supplements and takes them too, experiencing mood swings. Dee confronts Charlie about stealing the pills; they get into a fight, assault another person, and get arrested. With Charlie unable to fight, Mac takes his place and loses. Mac and Dennis are mugged again and Dennis loses the money he won betting against Mac. With Dee missing from the gym, Frank decides to fight Bobby. Frank knocks out Bobby by surprise, and as Bobby falls he knocks over Brianna, who breaks her neck on a stool.
13	6	"The Gang Gives Back"	Dan Attias	Charlie Day	July 20, 2006	IP02003	N/A
The Gang must atone for the events of "The Gang Goes Jihad": Mac, Dennis, and Dee are sentenced to coach inner-city children's basketball, and Charlie is sentenced to attend AA meetings. The Waitress, an alcoholic, is at the meetings and offers to be Charlie's sponsor just to get to Dennis. Mac and Dee compete to see who will be head coach, while Dennis is unimpressed with his team. Charlie imposes on the Waitress by visiting her at her apartment, where she asks about Dennis. When Frank hears about the coaching, he volunteers as well, resulting in Mac and Dee's team playing Frank and Dennis's team. Charlie and the Waitress attend the basketball game where she hits on Dennis; later she stops being Charlie's sponsor. Frank buys the other team's best player a new bike so he won't compete. Charlie gets drunk and shows up to referee the game, and the kids turn violent at the Gang's encouragement. Charlie blames the Waitress for the debacle.
14	7	"The Gang Exploits a Miracle"	Dan Attias	Charlie Day & Eric Falconer & Chris Romano	July 27, 2006	IP02009	N/A
When the Gang finds a water stain in the office that resembles the Virgin Mary, Frank charges patrons to see the "miracle". Meanwhile, Dennis stops eating when Dee tells him that his face is fat. A former childhood friend of the Gang, Matthew Mara (David Hornsby), comes to the bar and is revealed to now be a priest; the Gang wants him to bless the water stain, and Dee unsuccessfully asks him out. An old woman asks Mac to bless her, so he and Charlie become dueling preachers and argue about the Bible. Dee again approaches Matthew, this time in a confessional, and tells him she loves him. Frank and Dennis recruit Frank's now-elderly reverend to bless the stain, bringing him to Paddy's, where the reverend urinates on the Virgin Mary stain. Matthew shows up and asks Dee to marry him, declaring he left the church for her; she turns him down. Dennis, having fasted for days, collapses.
15	8	"The Gang Runs for Office"	Dan Attias	David Hornsby	August 3, 2006	IP02006	N/A
After realizing political corruption's money-making potential, the Gang helps Dennis run for the position of a local comptroller. Frank, as the campaign manager, enlists homeless men to wear campaign advertisements. Dennis fires Frank, who goes to Dee encouraging her to run. Mac meets with local union reps and tries to bribe them; offended, they threaten to kill him. Dennis campaigns at the mall, where Mac accosts a woman and her baby. Charlie and Dennis try to film a campaign video. Frank and Dee visit the real comptroller, where they try to blackmail him; he asks Dee out on a date. Frank and Mac create a smear ad accusing Dennis of rape to force him to drop out, but Frank instead gives Charlie the tape for his Garbage Pail Kids collection. On their date, the comptroller gets Dee drunk; they are interrupted by his wife, who throws a drink in Dee's face. Dennis decides not to run when he discovers the position would involve work.
16	9	"Charlie Goes America All Over Everybody's Ass"	Dan Attias	Charlie Day & Rob McElhenney	August 10, 2006	IP02008	N/A
Outraged when Dennis smokes in the bar, Charlie teams with Dee to start an anti-smoking rally. Dee views the rally as an acting exercise. Meanwhile, Mac, Dennis, and Frank turn Paddy's Pub into an "anything goes" bar, but their "Girls Gone Wild" videos are interrupted by Frank's Vietnamese gambling friends and the McPoyle brothers. Mac and Dennis tell Frank and his friends to move to the basement. Dee and Charlie show up the next morning, and Charlie is furious that the McPoyles are allowed in the bar. Dee asks her acting friend Artemis for help; they perform on the sidewalk outside Paddy's in full period costume before Charlie interrupts them. When heroin users show up at Paddy's and the McPoyles stab Charlie with a fork, Mac and Dennis realize their "anything goes" rules have backfired. They go to the basement to find Frank officiating a game of Russian roulette between two of the Vietnamese men, one of whom shoots himself in the head.
17	10	"Dennis and Dee Get a New Dad"	Dan Attias	Story by : Charlie Day & Rob McElhenney; Teleplay by : Rob McElhenney	August 17, 2006	IP02010	0.96
Dee is contacted on MySpace by a man named Bruce (Stephen Collins) who claims to be her and Dennis's real father; they confront Frank and their mother Barbara, who immediately confirms that Bruce is their father. Frank, irate, causes a scene and collapses. Meanwhile, Mac and Charlie visit Mac's convict father Luther (Gregory Scott Cummins) in jail. In order to impress Mac's father, they agree to beat up Bruce for Frank, but do not go through with the planned attack. After bonding with his newfound children at a fundraiser, Bruce invites Dennis, Dee and Barbara to a hospital to cheer up dying children. The family cannot see the point of Bruce's philanthropy, leading Dennis and Dee to lose interest in spending time with him. Frank arranges a date with an ex-lover, who turns out to be Charlie's mother; Charlie realizes that Frank may be his dad.

== Reception ==
The second season received positive reviews. On Rotten Tomatoes, it has an approval rating of 95% with an average score of 7.8 out of 10 based on 21 reviews. The website's critical consensus reads, "The Gang becomes complete with the addition of Danny DeVito, whose wily performance gives Always Sunny a new shine."

== Home media ==
The season two episodes are presented in production order, rather than their original broadcast order.

It's Always Sunny in Philadelphia: Seasons 1 & 2
Set details	Special features
17 episodes; 3-disc DVD set (Region 1 & 4); Technical specifications: Full Frame (1.33:1); English Dolby Surround; English, French, and Spanish subtitles	Scenes from the Original Pilot; Two audio commentaries: "Mac Bangs Dennis' Mom" "Hundred Dollar Baby": Two featurettes: Sunny Side Up Making-of Fox Movie Channel Presents Making A Scene: It's Always Sunny in Philadelphia: The Gang F**ks Up outtakes; Kaitlin Olson audition tapes
Release dates
Region 1	Region 4
September 4, 2007	June 2, 2009
