= Pepitone =

Pepitone is an Italian surname. Notable people with the surname include:

- Joe Pepitone (1940–2023), American baseball player
- Eddie Pepitone (born 1958), American actor and comedian
