= Freeze Out =

Freeze Out may refer to:

- Freeze Out (film), a 2005 American film
- The Freeze-Out, 1921 western starring Harry Carey
- Freeze Out (game show), a British game show
- Ione, California, previously known as Freeze Out
