= Latte and the Magic Waterstone =

2019 German animation film directed by Mimi Maynard

- German theatrical release poster
- German: Latte Igel und der magische Wasserstein
- Directed by: Mimi Maynard; Regina Welker; Nina Wels
- Written by: Martin Behnke; Andrea Deppert; Marina Martins; Jesper Møller
- Based on: Latte and the Magic Waterstone by Sebastian Lybeck
- Produced by: Lilian Klages
- Starring: Ashley Bornancin; Danny Fehsenfeld; Leslie L. Miller
- Music by: Andreas Hoge
- Production companies: Dreamin' Dolphin Film GmbH; Eagle Eye Filmproduktion; Grid Animation; Umedia; Simonsays Pictures
- Distributed by: StudioCanal (Germany); Sola Media (Worldwide Sales); Netflix (International)
- Release dates: October 9, 2019 (Schlingel); December 25, 2019 (Germany); July 31, 2020 (Netflix); April 24, 2021 (United States)
- Running time: 82 minutes
- Countries: Germany; Belgium
- Languages: German; English
- Box office: $4.9 million

Latte and the Magic Waterstone (German: Latte Igel und der magische Wasserstein) is a 2019 computer-animated film directed by Mimi Maynard, Regina Welker, and Nina Wels. Based on the 1971 book of the same name by Sebastian Lybeck, it was adapted for film with a screenplay by Martin Behnke, Andrea Deppert, Marina Martins, and Jesper Møller. The film premiered at the Schlingel International Film Festival in 2019, and was released in Germany on December 25, 2019. It was later released on Netflix as an original film on July 31, 2020.

The film stars Luisa Wietzorek as Latte, an ambitious hedgehog, and Tim Schwarzmaier as Tjum, a shy and clumsy red squirrel, on a journey to retrieve the magic waterstone from the thief who stole it. In the English dub produced by Netflix, Latte and Tjum are voiced by Ashley Bornancin and Carter Hastings respectively. Other stars include Henning Baum and Timur Bartels in the German dub, and Danny Fehsenfeld, Gunnar Sizemore, and Leslie Miller in the English dub. Latte and the Magic Waterstone received mixed reviews.

== Plot ==
Latte, an orphaned hedgehog, is a social outcast in a small forest community of woodland animals. Her only friend, a red squirrel named Tjum, is convinced that Latte is a princess after she lies that her father was the king of a faraway kingdom. A recent drought forces the community to conserve water more carefully than usual, storing what little they can find in pumpkins. An emergency council meeting is called, during which an elderly crow insists that the drought was caused by the theft of a magic waterstone. The crow insists that for the water to return, someone must steal the waterstone back from King Bantur, who took it. The town is unconvinced, but Latte takes it upon herself to retrieve the waterstone and return it to the White Mountains.

Latte encounters a beaver building a dam on the dry river banks who points her in the right direction. Tjum's younger sister convinces him to find and accompany Latte to keep her safe on the journey. Tjum follows Latte in an attempt to change her mind, but Latte is determined. The pair are attacked by a lynx but are saved by the beaver, who renders the lynx unconscious with a heavy log. Despite the danger, Latte still refuses to return home without completing her mission. On the first night, the pair meet Greta, a fire-bellied toad, who lets them stay in her cave. Greta gives Latte and Tjum food and water, and tells them about the waterstone, whose existence Tjum is still skeptical of.

In the morning, Greta gives Tjum a bag of waterberries that can quell one's thirst, and tells him to ration them carefully. Greta warns the pair about a pack of wolves that are also after the waterstone. Not long after, Latte and Tjum are cornered by the wolves, led by Lupo, but the wolves let them go when Latte reveals her mission. On the second night, Latte begs Tjum for a waterberry, and Tjum relents after losing a game of cups and balls. Latte reveals that she is not truly a princess, but Tjum is unsurprised and supportive. The next morning, Tjum tells Latte that he's going to return to the community and insists that she should come with him, but Latte still refuses to go back without the waterstone. The two argue over who should take the waterberries and accidentally destroy them in the process. Angered, the two go their separate ways.

Tjum feels remorseful and tries to return to Latte, but gets lost and stumbles into bear territory. He meets Amaroo, a young bear cub willing to help him sneak into the bear cave. Amaroo reveals that he is the prince of the bears, his father being King Bantur, the bear who allegedly stole the waterstone from the White Mountains. Tjum decides he needs to tell Latte, but when Amaroo tries to sneak him back out of the cave, they are stopped by the guards and Tjum is captured. Meanwhile, Latte tries to find another way into the cave. She meets an elderly, antisocial hedgehog who tells her that she is destined to die alone, as all hedgehogs do. Latte is upset, but still determined to bring the waterstone back. While attempting to sneak into the cave through a river, Latte is captured by the guards and taken to a cell, where she reunites with Tjum.

Latte and Tjum are brought to King Bantur, who admits to stealing the waterstone, but is unconcerned with the drought this theft has caused for the rest of the forest. While King Bantur is distracted with the other bears, Latte and Tjum steal the waterstone from the rock it's wedged in, and escape the bear cave through a river. As they are running back to the White Mountains, they are ambushed by Lupo, King Bantur, and the lynx. Tjum manages to distract them while Latte returns the stone. The resulting flood washes all three away. Latte and Tjum are picked up by the elderly crow and taken back to the community, where water has been restored. Tjum's father offers to adopt Latte into their family to offer her the family she never had, which she accepts. Meanwhile, a reformed King Bantur watches Amaroo do his acrobatic tricks with some water back in their cave.

== English voice cast ==
- Ashley Bornancin as Latte, a brave and kind-hearted young hedgehog.
- Carter Hastings as Tjum, a shy and clumsy red squirrel, and Latte's closest friend.
- Danny Fehsenfeld as King Bantur, a greedy kodiak bear that rules the bear kingdom.
- Gunnar Sizemore as Amaroo, a friendly kodiak bear cub, and King Bantur's only son.
- Leslie L. Miller as Greta, a poison dart frog who lives in a mushroom cave.
- Eric Saleh as Aken, an elderly rabbit and community leader.
- Daniel Amerman as Lupo, a cunning Arctic wolf who is the leader of a small pack.
- Julian Grant as Johnson, a raven.
- Byron Marc Newsome as a Bear Guard.
- Linus Drews as a wild boar.
- Carla Renata as the wild boar's mother.

== Production ==
The film was based on Sebastian Lybeck's children's book Latte Igelkott och vattenstenen (1956), Lilian Klages who co-worked with Regina Walker grow up enjoying the book wishing one day she should make a film about the book. In 2014, the Munich-based studio Dreamin' Dolphin Film made a short teasing the main characters to tease a potential feature release and to secure funding. The short won the award for Best German Screenplay at the Stuttgart International Festival of Animated Film. Later that year, Welker signed on to direct the film, her feature directorial debut. In 2017, Nina Wels joined the project as a co-director, and production of the film began that summer. The final sound mix was completed in April 2019. In Lybeck's book, Latte is male, but the directors changed this detail when adapting the story. According to Welker, the biggest challenge in the writing process was Latte's characterization. Welker told Animation Magazine, "Latte has so many different character traits, which makes her super interesting but also difficult to balance her behavior. She can be loud and strong, but also silent and emotional."

The film's animation is made using Autodesk Maya and rendered using Arnold with 14-CPU farms supported by Houdini and Blackmagic Fusion. The directors wanted the film to have a realistic nature environment that has not been touched by humans at all. Most of the applications took place at Grid's studios in Ghent to give the film a "Pixar-esque" design with realistic fur on the characters and trees, around 73 animators used Dell Computers to give the appearance of the textures by open-source documents made on Substance Painter and Grid's proprietary software the Gclus, philmCGI in India and Tinker Magic in Spain handled the additional animation.

The film involved the completion of more than 1,200 visual effects shots, including the complex compositing of background and foreground plates and CG render layers for 3D assets, lighting and procedural effects. There were also motion vector tools to allow for the motion blur to be added in post, UV tools to reposition and remap textures, and finally relighting tools that could modify the animals, ambient occlusion and position passes to allow for atmosphere and grading adjustments throughout the compositing process.

== Reception ==
The film received mixed reviews. Review aggregator site Rotten Tomatoes surveyed five reviews from critics and judged 60% of them to be positive. In Germany, the German Film and Media Evaluation gave it a positive rating, ranking it as "especially valuable" and writing that people of all ages will enjoy it. Director Regina Welker described the reception in Germany as "well received", and that "the kids loved it", but felt that the release of Frozen II took the attention off of Latte and the Magic Waterstone rather quickly.

Maya Phillips for The New York Times called the film "unimaginatively simple", writing that, "'Latte' doesn't want to scare off the tykes with too much big-kid politics, even though films like Wall-E and Zootopia have proved that more nuanced stories about society can work even in children's films. It's too bad too — Latte was looking a bit revolutionary, and a lot more fun, for a second." John Serba for Decider called the film "okay", writing, "you could do better, you could do worse." Phillips and Serba both criticized the animation and the simplistic, safe themes of the narrative, as well as a forgettable story. However, they noted that the film is enjoyable for small children, the film's target demographic.
