= The Gang Gets Held Hostage =

- It's Always Sunny in Philadelphia episode
- Episode no.: Season 3 Episode 4
- Directed by: Fred Savage
- Story by: Lisa Parsons
- Teleplay by: Rob McElhenney
- Cinematography by: Peter Smokler
- Editing by: Josh Drisko
- Production code: IP03009
- Original air date: September 20, 2007
- Running time: 22 minutes

Guest appearances
- Jimmi Simpson as Liam McPoyle; Nate Mooney as Ryan McPoyle; Thesy Surface as Margaret McPoyle

Episode chronology
← Previous "Dennis and Dee's Mom Is Dead"	Next → "The Aluminum Monster vs. Fatty Magoo"
- It's Always Sunny in Philadelphia season 3

"The Gang Gets Held Hostage" is the fourth episode of the third season of the American television sitcom It's Always Sunny in Philadelphia. It is the 22nd overall episode of the series, and was written by series creator Rob McElhenney from a story by story editor Lisa Parsons, and directed by Fred Savage. It originally aired on FX on September 20, 2007, airing back-to-back with the previous episode, "Dennis and Dee's Mom Is Dead".

The series follows "The Gang", a group of five misfit friends: twins Dennis and Deandra "(Sweet) Dee" Reynolds, their friends Charlie Kelly and Ronald "Mac" McDonald, and Frank Reynolds, Dennis' and Dee's legal father. The Gang runs the fictional Paddy's Pub, an unsuccessful Irish bar in South Philadelphia. In the episode, the McPoyles hold The Gang hostage in Paddy's Pub while Frank crawls through the vents to find his will, which Charlie hid. The episode has many homages to Die Hard, and is a bottle episode.

== Plot ==
Mac (Rob McElhenney) helps Frank (Danny DeVito) crawl around the vents above Paddy's Pub so he can try to find his will that Charlie (Charlie Day) hid there. Dennis (Glenn Howerton), Charlie and Dee (Kaitlin Olson) arrive at the bar as three people dressed in black and wearing balaclavas and holding shotguns rush in. The masked intruders take their balaclavas off, revealing they are Liam (Jimmi Simpson), Ryan (Nate Mooney) and Margaret McPoyle (Thesy Surface). The McPoyles tell The Gang that they're taking them hostage, and calls the police with ransom demands.

Dennis tells the Gang that they should stick together, but then tells Dee that Mac or Charlie should die. Dennis and Dee form an alliance, but Dee then tells Charlie that Dennis wants him dead, and they decide to kill Dennis. Meanwhile, in the vents, Frank struggles to find the will due to the heater being on. Mac asks Charlie to decipher the map he made to Frank's will, and Charlie explains that it's a decoy fake map, and that the real map is tattooed on his ass. Mac checks out Charlie's ass, but it turns out that Charlie lied, and he farts in Mac's face. Charlie then confesses that the map Mac has is the real map. Dennis and Dee are forced by the McPoyles to dig through the floor into the building next door.

Dennis accuses Liam of being "full of shit", so to prove they're not bluffing, he asks Ryan to stab someone, so he stabs Liam. Frank tells Mac that Charlie should be the first one to die, so Mac and Charlie decide to kill Frank. Dee develops Stockholm syndrome, and sides with the McPoyles, but they send her back to the hostage side. The Gang are challenged to smash as much stuff as they can, and Dennis lures Margaret into the toilets to seduce her. Meanwhile, Dee and Mac smash bottles behind the bar and Charlie hides in the vents. In the attic, Charlie finds Frank and rips his will. Charlie goes to strangle Frank, but is met by Frank's gun, and is forced to lead him back to the bar. Dennis and Margaret make out, and Liam forces Dennis, Dee and Mac to the roof. Frank and Charlie escape the vents onto the roof, and Frank shoots at the McPoyles. The McPoyles run away and Dee realizes that their guns are fake.

== Production ==
The episode was directed by Fred Savage, and was written by series creator and main star Rob McElhenney and from a story by story editor Lisa Parsons.

== Reception ==
The episode received mixed reviews. IGN called it "disjointed but still quite funny", and rated it a "great" 8/10, and The A.V. Club gave it a C+ rating.
