= James Keach =

American actor (born 1947)

- Keach in 1976
- Born: James Peckham Keach; December 7, 1947 (age 78); Savannah, Georgia, U.S.
- Education: Northwestern University (BA); Yale University (MFA)
- Occupations: Actor; producer; director
- Years active: 1971–present
- Spouse(s): Holly Collins (m. 19??; div. 19??); Mimi Maynard (m. 19??; div. 1993) Jane Seymour (m. 1993; div. 2015)
- Children: 3
- Father: Stacy Keach Sr.
- Relatives: Stacy Keach (brother)

James Peckham Keach (born December 7, 1947) is an American actor and filmmaker. He is the brother of actor Stacy Keach and younger son of actor Stacy Keach Sr.

== Early life and education ==
James Peckham Keach was born in Savannah, Georgia, to Mary Cain (née Peckham), an actress, and Walter Stacy Keach Sr., a drama coach, actor, writer, and producer. His elder brother was Stacy Keach, an actor and narrator. Keach received his undergraduate degree from Northwestern University in 1970, a M.F.A. from the Yale School of Drama, and is also a classically trained Shakespearean actor.

== Career ==
Keach is known as a producer and director. He has also acted, portraying Jesse James in the 1980 film The Long Riders, a film which he co-wrote and produced. Johnny Cash was so taken by the film that he and June Carter became close friends with Keach and asked him to be involved in the development of Walk the Line, which Keach produced. Keach also appeared in numerous supporting roles in films such as National Lampoon's Vacation with Chevy Chase, The Razor's Edge opposite Bill Murray, and Wildcats with Goldie Hawn. He also played a leading role in the 1985 comedy film Moving Violations as Deputy Hank Halik.

He was the director of the 1993 TV series and 1999 film Dr. Quinn, Medicine Woman which starred his wife, Jane Seymour, and other episodic television. Most recently he has directed and produced Waiting for Forever and Blind Dating. He directed a documentary, Glen Campbell: I'll Be Me, about country music singer Glen Campbell and his battle with Alzheimer's disease, that was released in October 2014. He won a Grammy Award on March 14, 2021, as producer for the documentary Linda Ronstadt: The Sound of My Voice.

In 2010, Keach received the Ellis Island Medal of Honor.

== Personal life ==
Keach was married to Holly Collins, sister of Judy Collins. Their marriage produced a son, Kalen Keach. Sometime after his marriage to Collins ended, he married Mimi Maynard. Their marriage lasted until 1993.

In 1993, Keach married actress Jane Seymour. The couple had twin boys, born November 30, 1995, John Stacy and Kristopher Steven, who were named after family friends Johnny Cash and Christopher Reeve, and James's brother, actor Stacy Keach. In June 2007, both Keach and Seymour became patrons of Meningitis UK. On April 12, 2013, it was announced that the couple separated. The divorce was finalized in December 2015.

In 2024, Keach married Nancy Falkin Lynn at their home in Malibu.

== Filmography ==
=== Films ===
Title	Year	Role	Notes
Slashed Dreams	1975	Levon	
The Noah	1975	(voice)	
Cannonball	1976	Wolfe Messer	
Death Play	1976	Steve	
FM	1978	Lt. Reach	
Comes a Horseman	1978	Emil Kroegh	
Hurricane	1979	Sgt. Strang	
Smokey and the Hotwire Gang	1979	Joshua	
The Long Riders	1980	Jesse James	
The Legend of the Lone Ranger	1981	John Reid/The Lone Ranger (voice)	
Love Letters	1983	Oliver / Anna's lover	
National Lampoon's Vacation	1983	Motorcycle Cop	
The Razor's Edge	1984	Gray Maturin	
Moving Violations	1985	Deputy Halik	
Stand Alone	1985	Detective Isgrow	
Wildcats	1986	Frank	
Evil Town	1987	Christopher Fuller	
The Experts	1989	Yuri	
Options	1989	Ed Sloan	
The Dance Goes On	1992	James Smith	
The New Swiss Family Robinson	1998	Jack Robinson	
Walk the Line	2005	Warden	
Turning Point	2017	Narrator	Documentary film

=== Narrative films ===
Title	Year	Director	Producer	Writer	Notes
Sunburst	1975	No	No	Yes	
The Long Riders	1980	No	Executive	Yes	
Armed and Dangerous	1986	No	Yes	Story	
The Experts	1989	No	Yes	No	
False Identity	1990	Associate	Yes	No	
The Stars Fell on Henrietta	1995	No	Yes	No	
Camouflage	2001	Yes	No	No	
Walk the Line	2005	No	Yes	No	
Blind Dating	2006	Yes	Yes	No	
Waiting for Forever	2010	Yes	Yes	No	
Bereave	2015	No	Executive	No	
The Mix Up	2017	Yes	No	No	Short film
A Quest for Rainbows	TBA	Yes	No	No	
Tough as They Come	TBA	No	Yes	No	

==== Documentaries ====
Title	Year	Director	Producer
Disease of the Wind	2002	Yes	No
Glen Campbell: I'll Be Me	2014	Yes	Yes
Turning Point	2017	Yes	Yes
Augie	2018	Yes	Yes
David Crosby: Remember My Name	2019	No	Executive
Linda Ronstadt: The Sound of My Voice	2019	No	Yes
Gregg Allman: The Music of My Soul	2026	Yes	Yes
Steam Power	TBA	Yes	Yes
Horn Maker	TBA	No	Yes

=== Television films ===
Title	Year	Role
Deadly Visitor	1973	Virgil
Miles to Go Before I Sleep	1975	Man in Bar
The Hatfields and the McCoys	1975	Jim McCoy
Six Characters in Search of an Author	1976	The Son
Kill Me If You Can	1977	Officer #1
The Blue Hotel	1977	Johnnie
Nowhere to Run	1978	McEnerney
Lacy and the Mississippi Queen	1978	Parker
Like Normal People	1979	Robert Meyers Jr.
The Great Cash Giveaway Getaway	1980	Bondo
Big Bend Country	1981	Ian McGregor
Thou Shalt Not Kill	1982	Jeff Tompkins
Till Death Do Us Part	1982	Robert Craig
Wishman	1983	Galen Reed
The Man Who Broke 1,000 Chains	1987	Father Vincent Godfrey Burns
Good Cops, Bad Cops	1990	Frank Moran
Murder in High Places	1991	Levering
Enslavement: The True Story of Fanny Kemble	2000	Dr. Huston
Perfectly Prudence	2011	Mister

==== Filmmaking credits ====
Title	Year	Director	Producer	Writer
A Winner Never Quits	1986	No	Yes	No
The Forgotten	1989	Yes	Yes	Yes
Sunstroke	1992	Yes	No	No
Praying Mantis	1993	Yes	Executive	No
A Passion for Justice: The Hazel Brannon Smith Story	1994	Yes	Executive	No
The Absolute Truth	1997	Yes	Executive	No
A Marriage of Convenience	1998	Yes	Executive	No
A Memory in My Heart	1999	No	Executive	No
Murder in the Mirror	2000	Yes	Executive	No
Enslavement: The True Story of Fanny Kemble	2000	Yes	Executive	No
Blackout	2001	Yes	Executive	No
Submerged	2001	Yes	No	No
Mom's on Strike	2002	Yes	No	No

=== Television series ===
Title	Year(s)	Role	Notes
NET Playhouse	1971	Orville Wright	Episode: "The Wright Brothers"
Kung Fu	1973	Abe Jones	Episode: "The Assassin"
Kojak	1973	Ted Strong	Episode: "Girl in the River"
Ironside	1974	Walter Portman	Episode: "The Taste of Ashes"
The Rookies	1974	Stoney Putnam	Episode: "Legacy of Death"
Movin' On	1974	Ron	Episode: "The Trick Is to Stay Alive"
Cannon	1974–1976	Johnny Cabe / Pete Wallace	2 episodes
The Manhunter	1975	Reichart	Episode: "Man in a Cage"
Police Woman	1975	Cliff Hummel / Del Franklin	Episode: "Ice"
S.W.A.T.	1975	Arlie Warren	Episode: "A Coven of Killers"
Switch	1975	Dean 'Skip' Crowe	Episode: "The Body at the Bottom"
Starsky & Hutch	1975–1977	James March Wrightwood / Ed Chambers	2 episodes
Joe Forrester	1976	Unknown	Episode: "The Boy Next Door"
The Quest	1976	Blue	Episode: "Day of Outrage"
Baa Baa Black Sheep	1977	Captain Ted Gerslinger	Episode: "Trouble at Fort Apache"
The Tony Randall Show	1977	Bastian	Episode: "Bobby vs. Michael"
The Next Step Beyond	1978	Chris Stabler	Episode: "The Haunted Inn"
Quincy, M.E.	1979	Gary Harlan	Episode: "A Small Circle of Friends"
CHiPs	1981	Motorcycle LAPD Cop	Episode: "Karate"
Magnum, P.I.	1983	Killer (uncredited)	Episode: "...By Its Cover"
Dr. Quinn, Medicine Woman	1997	Brent Currier	Episode: "Hostage"
This One 'n That One	2012	Big Jim	Unknown episodes
Ray Donovan	2017	Tom	4 episodes

==== Filmmaking credits ====
Title	Year(s)	Director	Producer	Notes
Hull High	1990	Yes	No	Episode #1.7
The Young Riders	1990–1992	Yes	Yes	Director (9 episodes) / Producer (11 episodes)
Covington Cross	1992	Yes	No	2 episodes
Jack's Place	1993	Yes	No	Episode: "The Pipes Are Calling"
Dr. Quinn, Medicine Woman	1993–1999	Yes	Executive	Director (26 episodes) / Producer (The Movie)
The District	2003-2004	Yes	No	2 episodes
JAG	2004	Yes	No	Episode: "A Girl's Best Friend"
The Quitter Show	2009	No	Executive	2 episodes
This One 'n That One	2012	No	Yes	Urknown episodes
