= Dennis and Dee Go on Welfare =

- It's Always Sunny in Philadelphia episode
- Episode no.: Season 2 Episode 3
- Directed by: Dan Attias
- Written by: Rob McElhenney
- Story by: Charlie Day; Glenn Howerton; Rob McElhenney
- Cinematography by: Peter Smokler
- Editing by: Josh Drisko
- Production code: IP02004
- Original air date: July 6, 2006
- Running time: 22 minutes

Guest appearances
- Joanna Sanchez as Maria; Eddie Pepitone as Tony; Aisha Hinds as Caseworker

Episode chronology
← Previous "The Gang Goes Jihad"	Next → "Mac Bangs Dennis' Mom"
- It's Always Sunny in Philadelphia season 2

"Dennis and Dee Go on Welfare" is the third episode of the second season of the American television sitcom It's Always Sunny in Philadelphia. It is the tenth overall episode of the series, and was written by series creator Rob McElhenney, from a story by executive producers Charlie Day and Glenn Howerton and McElhenney. It was directed by executive producer Dan Attias, and originally aired on FX on July 6, 2006, back-to-back with the following episode, "Mac Bangs Dennis' Mom".

The series follows "The Gang", a group of five misfit friends: twins Dennis and Deandra "(Sweet) Dee" Reynolds, their friends Charlie Kelly and Mac, and Frank Reynolds, Dennis' and Dee's legal father. The Gang runs the fictional Paddy's Pub, an unsuccessful Irish bar in South Philadelphia.

Dennis and Dee quit their jobs to pursue their dreams, but when Mac reminds them that their unemployment checks will eventually run out, they get hooked on crack cocaine so they can apply for welfare. Meanwhile, Frank hires two new workers under the "Work for Welfare" program, and Charlie and Mac go on a spending spree with the money in Frank's secret bank account.

== Plot ==
Dennis (Glenn Howerton) and Dee (Kaitlin Olson), chafing at Frank (Danny DeVito)'s ordering them around, quit Paddy's Pub and sign up for unemployment benefits when they realize they would make more money than they were from working at the bar. Mac (Rob McElhenney) finds Dennis and Dee "piss ass drunk" on a stoop at 1pm, and asks them to come back to the bar, but they decline, saying they're going to go on welfare. At Paddy's Pub, Frank sets up an account in Charlie (Charlie Day)'s name to hide money from his wife. Mac comes to Frank and Charlie with a way of exploiting the "work for welfare" program, where they can get employees who they don't have to pay.

Charlie and Mac arrive at the welfare office and talk to a caseworker (Aisha Hinds) to discuss their interest in signing up for the "work for welfare program." She gives them a large binder filled with rules and regulations. As the two are leaving, they run into Dee and Dennis, who are about to apply for welfare. Dennis tries to tell the caseworker that he is a recovering crack addict and his sister Dee is intellectually disabled. The skeptical caseworker says that the two need to provide medical documents and a blood test to prove the validity of their situations. The two drive to another part of the city to purchase crack cocaine, and plan to smoke just enough crack to test positive on the blood test, and become eligible for welfare benefits.

At Paddy's Pub, Frank assigns jobs to two new employees, Maria (Joanna Sanchez) and Tony (Eddie Pepitone). Mac and Charlie then realize that with their newly gained free time, Frank would want to hang out with them, which they don't want. Charlie then concocts a plan to access money out of the new bank account so that he and Mac can go out and party. The two agree to take a limited amount of money to stay below Frank's radar, but end up purchasing fancy suits and top hats, and hang out with several high priced prostitutes. Dennis and Dee wake up feeling the effects of the crack that they had smoked and realize that they have missed their appointment for their blood test by an entire day. Mac and Charlie, living it up in a limousine with the prostitutes, bump into Dennis and Dee. Dennis asks Mac and Charlie if they have some money to give, but they laugh and decline.

At Paddy's Pub, Frank receives a call from the bank telling him that his account has been accessed, so Frank suspends the account, leading to Charlie and Mac not being able to pay the prostitutes, and running away when they threaten to call their pimps. Dennis and Dee decide to seek out rehab after their addiction grows stronger. Frank says that major changes have to be made at Paddy's, and fires Tony and Maria. Frank assigns all of the bar's most distasteful duties (previously handled by Charlie) to Dennis and Dee and promotes Charlie to management for showing initiative and having the courage to steal his money. Mac admits to doing the same thing, hoping for a reward, but Frank tells him that he gets nothing because he is a follower and a thief.

== Production ==
The episode was directed by executive producer Dan Attias, who directed all episodes in the season, except for the season premiere, "Charlie Gets Crippled", and was written by series creator Rob McElhenney from a story he co-wrote with Charlie Day and Glenn Howerton.

== Reception ==
The episode was received positively, with Rolling Stone rating it 19th in their list of 20 Best It's Always Sunny in Philadelphia episodes. The scene of Mac and Charlie in tuxedos and top hats mocking Dennis and Dee's crack addiction by pretending to cry in sympathy has become an Internet meme.
