= The Gang Gets Racist =

- It's Always Sunny in Philadelphia episode
- Episode no.: Season 1 Episode 1
- Directed by: John Fortenberry
- Written by: Rob McElhenney; Charlie Day
- Cinematography by: Peter Smokler
- Editing by: Robert Bramwell
- Production code: 1P01001
- Original air date: August 4, 2005
- Running time: 22 minutes

Guest appearances
- Mary Elizabeth Ellis as The Waitress; Malcolm Barrett as Terrell; Telisha Shaw as Janell

Episode chronology
← Previous —	Next → "Charlie Wants an Abortion"
- It's Always Sunny in Philadelphia season 1

"The Gang Gets Racist" is the pilot episode of the American television sitcom It's Always Sunny in Philadelphia. It was written by series creator Rob McElhenney and executive producer Charlie Day, and directed by executive producer John Fortenberry. It originally aired on FX on August 4, 2005.

The pilot introduces the four main characters, known as The Gang: Dennis Reynolds (played by Glenn Howerton), Deandra 'Sweet Dee' Reynolds (played by Kaitlin Olson), Charlie Kelly (played by Day), and Mac (played by McElhenney).

== Plot ==
As Charlie, Dennis, and Mac start closing up Paddy's Pub, Dee brings a friend from her acting class, Terrell. Charlie, Dennis, and Mac are surprised by Terrell because he's African-American, which is not what they expected. Hearing several stories from Terrell, a club promoter, pulling in hundreds of people, they discuss at a coffee shop how they should hire Terrell in the hope of profit for the bar. While discussing the possibility, Charlie air-quotes Terrell about his parties having "niggers hanging from rafters". The Waitress from the coffee shop, who Charlie has a crush on, overhears this and claims that Charlie is racist and mocks him, saying that he's Adolf Hitler. After the Waitress leaves, they all decide to hire Terrell.

Later in the day, Mac and Charlie visit a local college campus to make new black friends. Mac fails to fit in as he's awkward around them. Charlie, on the other hand, bonds with them very well in a game of dominoes. Charlie receives a phone number from one of the students, Janell, who shows interest in him. Charlie doesn't show interest in Janell because he believes he and Mac should focus on befriending black men, not women. Mac realizes the real reason is that he's only obsessed with the Waitress and creates a scene on campus to show that Charlie keeps a picture of her in his wallet and threatens to rip it up. Charlie convinces Mac not to rip it up by saying he'll call Janell later.

Terrell shows up at the bar with a crowd of people. The gang is surprised by the number of people, making it Paddy's most successful night. However, they realized by Mac's cousin, Brett, that they are now running the hottest gay bar in Philadelphia. Mixed opinions arise from the gang. Charlie and Dennis are in favor of the bar becoming a gay bar mainly due to the money from it. Dee is against the change, deciding to go into Terrell's house and yell at him about why he didn't inform her about him being gay due to her passion for him. Mac's also against it and agrees with Dee, stating that the original idea of the bar is to get laid. The gang decides to take a vote, but Charlie and Dennis rig it by exempting Dee because Dee isn't one of the owners of Paddy's Pub, making Mac the only one opposing it. Therefore, Paddy's Pub remains a gay bar.

Charlie decides to have a date with Janell at the coffee shop. However, he only brings Janell to prove to the Waitress that he isn't racist and tries to get a date with the Waitress. The Waitress declines, as this isn't his first time trying to ask her on a date. Janell comes over to ask what's wrong with Charlie and the Waitress, and the Waitress informs her about Charlie's motivations, about using her to prove that he's not racist and to ask someone else for the date. Janell punches Charlie's eye and threatens him about never seeing her again. Charlie goes to Paddy's Pub to heal his eye, and Dee hears about the story with him and Janell.

While back at the bar, Dennis seems more outgoing with the gay men. Mac and Dee create a plan to make Paddy's Pub return to normal. Dee decides to get her friends from her acting class and tasks Mac to get Dennis unconscious. After getting Dennis blackout drunk by constantly asking him about the method of taking a tequila shot, he wakes up naked next to a blonde man and a black man coming out of the bathroom. Dennis is horrified and tells the gang to stop the gay bar experiment. Charlie is still obstinate about changing the bar to what it originally was. While informing Terrell about the decision, Dee appears with Janell, who is revealed to be Terrell's sister.

Charlie insults Janell in front of Terrell, and Mac makes a racist statement about how all black people are related, causing the room to become extremely discomfiting. The episode then cuts to Mac and Dee counting the money earned and how they're back to normal. Mac thanks Dee for turning the bar to normal, but Dee informs that she couldn't get in touch with her acting friends, implying that Dennis' sleeping with men was an intoxicated decision by him and not staged by Dee.

== Production ==
The original "pilot" for the series consisted of a home-movie made by McElhenney, Howerton, and Day based on an idea originated by McElhenney who described it as "a guy going over to another guy's house to ask him for sugar, and the other guy telling him that he has cancer. And instead of the friend being compassionate, he just wants to get the sugar and get out the door." The premise for this short was eventually transformed into the fourth episode of the series "Charlie has Cancer." It was believed this pilot of the series was shot with a budget of just $200, but Charlie Day would later comment, "We shot it for nothing... I don't know where this $200 came from... We were a bunch of kids with cameras running around shooting each other and [the] next thing you know, we're eleven years in and we're still doing the show." This pilot was shopped by the actors around various studios, their pitch being simply showing the DVD of the pilot to executives. After viewing the pilot, FX Network ordered the first season, with "The Gang Gets Racist" being aired as its first episode.

The show was budgeted at $450,000 an episode, less than a third of a network standard, using Panasonic's DVX100 MiniDV prosumer video camera. The original concept had "the gang" being out-of-work actors with the theme song being a cha-cha version of "Hooray for Hollywood"; however there were too many shows at the time with a similar premise. "The network came to us and said, 'We don't want a show about actors,' and we said, 'Fine, let's put it somewhere else,'" McElhenney explained. "I'm from Philly, let's put it in Philly, and we'll make it about a bar, because that's a job where you can have lots of free time and still have income that could explain how these people can sustain themselves." The title was later changed to reflect that, in the unaired pilot, the gang had been rewritten as bar owners in Philadelphia, instead of actors in LA. Prior to Kaitlin Olson joining the show, the character Sweet Dee was originally played by Jordan Reid, who at the time was the girlfriend of McElhenney, but was recast after they broke up. Kirsten Wiig also auditioned for the role.

== Reception ==
Vulture's Larry Fitzmaurice said the pilot episode "makes no bones about establishing the show's capacity to offend," observing that it was "impressive to witness in the rearview how much Always Sunny has stayed true to its roots even as it's added embellishment after embellishment."
