= False Identity (1990 film) =

1990 film by James Keach

- Directed by: James Keach
- Written by: Sandra K. Bailey
- Produced by: James Shavick
- Starring: Stacy Keach; Geneviève Bujold; Tobin Bell; Mimi Maynard; Veronica Cartwright
- Cinematography: Bernard Auroux
- Edited by: Nancy Frazen
- Music by: Barry Goldberg
- Production companies: Pavilion Pictures; RKO Pictures
- Distributed by: RKO Pictures
- Release date: June 8, 1990
- Running time: 93 mins.
- Country: United States
- Language: English

False Identity is a 1990 American crime thriller film directed by James Keach. It stars Stacy Keach and Geneviève Bujold.

== Plot summary ==
When Rachel, a radio personality, discovers a Purple Heart at a garage sale she decides to find out its history. She finds that the medal belonged to a man named Harlan Erickson, a long-lost brother of the town's leading citizen.

== Cast ==
- Stacy Keach as Ben Driscoll / Harlan Errickson
- Geneviève Bujold as Rachel Roux
- Tobin Bell as Marshal Errickson
- Veronica Cartwright as Vera Errickson
- Mimi Maynard as Audrey
- Michael Champion as Luther
- Todd Jeffries as Chad Erickson
- Anne Bloom as Elise
- Grainger Hines as Tommy
- Tom McFadden as Sheriff (credited as Thom McFadden)
- William Lucking as Frank Calovich
- Renee O'Connor as Angela Errickson
- Stacy Keach Sr. as Irving Campbell
- Robert Fredrickson as Ralph Murphy
- Kimberly Beck as Cindy Roger
- Pat Crawford Brown as Nellie (credited as Pat Crawford)
