= Mimi Maynard =

American film and television actress

- Occupation: Actress
- Years active: 1975–present
- Website: https://voice-masters.com/pages/about-us

Mimi Maynard is an American film and television actress and voice artist.

== Career ==
Since 1975, she has appeared in at least ten films and seventeen television productions, including voicing the character "I.Q's Mom" in the animated family-adventure film Fly Me to the Moon (2008).

She has also worked extensively in voice casting and sound design.

== Filmography ==
Year	Title	Role	Director	Notes	Ref.
1975	Medical Center	Danielle Carter	Vincent Sherman		
1975	S.W.A.T.	Pam Morgan	George McCowan		
1976	Hawmps!	Jennifer Hawkins	Joe Camp		
1977	The Streets of San Francisco	Edith Harris	Richard Lang		
1978	The Users	Photographer's assistant	Joseph Hardy		
1979–1982	Hart to Hart	Deanne	Ralph Senensky		
1979	Beach Patrol	Wanda	Bob Kelljan		
1980	Condominium	Lorrie Higbee	Sidney Hayers		
1980	Private Benjamin	Liz	Howard Zieff		
1980	Trapper John, M.D.	Denise Newton	Alex March		
1980	Underground Aces	Madeline	Robert Butler		
1982	Washington Mistress or Broken Dreams	Peggy	Peter Levin		
1982	The Young and the Restless	Carolyn Harper			
1987	Mike Hammer	Mike's new secretary	Jay Bernstein		
1987	Harry	Mildred	Jay Bernstein		
1987	Talking Walls or Motel Vacancy		Stephen Verona		
1989	The Experts	Betty Smith	Dave Thomas		
1989	The Forgotten	Claudia Lowell	James Keach	Best Supporting Actress in a Movie or Mini-Series, 1990 CableACE Award	
1990	False Identity	Audrey	James Keach		
1991	Adventures in Dinosaur City	Dana	Brett R. Thompson	also producer	
1992	Frozen Assets	voice	George T. Miller		
1992	Play Nice	Mrs. Kessler	Terri Treas		
1993	L.A. Law	Alison Schein	Tom Moore		
1993	Lois & Clark: The New Adventures of Superman	Launch Commander	Robert Butler		
2008	Fly Me to the Moon		Ben Stassen	producer	
2010	A Turtle's Tale: Sammy's Adventures	baby hatchling	Ben Stassen	also producer	
2012	A Turtle's Tale 2: Sammy's Escape from Paradise		Vincent Kesteloot; Ben Stassen	producer	
2016	Robinson Crusoe		Vincent Kesteloot; Ben Stassen	producer	
2019	Latte and the Magic Waterstone		Mimi Maynard	director	
2021	Luca	Pinuccia Aragosta	Enrico Casarosa		
