= It's Always Sunny in Philadelphia season 1 =

2005 season of American television series

It's Always Sunny in Philadelphia
- Season 1
- DVD cover
- Starring: Charlie Day; Glenn Howerton; Rob McElhenney; Kaitlin Olson
- No. of episodes: 7

Release
- Original network: FX
- Original release: August 4 – September 13, 2005

Season chronology
- Next → Season 2

The first season of the American television sitcom series It's Always Sunny in Philadelphia premiered on FX on August 4, 2005. The season contains 7 episodes and concluded airing on September 13, 2005.

== Cast ==
=== Main cast ===
- Charlie Day as Charlie Kelly
- Glenn Howerton as Dennis Reynolds
- Rob McElhenney as Ronald "Mac" McDonald
- Kaitlin Olson as Deandra "Dee" Reynolds

=== Recurring cast ===
- Mary Elizabeth Ellis as The Waitress

=== Guest stars ===
- Malcolm Barrett as Terrell
- Telisha Shaw as Janell
- Spencer Daniels as Tommy
- Autumn Reeser as Megan
- Heather Donahue as Stacy Corvelli
- Robert Adamson as Trey
- Katie Chonacas as Sara
- Jaimie Alexander as Tammy
- Artemis Pebdani as Artemis
- Brittany Daniel as Carmen
- Michael Rosenbaum as Colin
- Shelly Desai as Hwang
- Robert Blanche as Detective Jones
- Tom Bower as Pop Pop
- Lindsey McKeon as Rebecca Keane
- Dennis Haskins as Chris Murray
- Lynne Marie Stewart as Charlie's Mother
- Jimmi Simpson as Liam McPoyle
- Nate Mooney as Ryan McPoyle

== Episodes ==
No. overall	No. in season	Title	Directed by	Written by	Original release date	Prod. code	US viewers (millions)
1	1	"The Gang Gets Racist"	John Fortenberry	Charlie Day & Rob McElhenney	August 4, 2005	IP01001	1.42
Dennis and Deandra ("Sweet Dee"), co-owner/bartender and waitress, respectively, of Paddy's, a failing pub in Philadelphia, hire Terrell, a student in Dee's acting class, as a club promoter and turns Paddy's into Philadelphia's hottest gay bar. Meanwhile, Mac and Charlie (childhood friends and also co-owners of Paddy's) try to prove that they are not prejudiced against African-Americans after Charlie's crush (a coffee shop waitress) overhears him use a racial slur. After Dennis gets drunk and wakes up with two men, he changes his mind about Paddy's being a gay bar. Mac fires and then offends Terrell.
2	2	"Charlie Wants an Abortion"	John Fortenberry	Charlie Day & Rob McElhenney	August 11, 2005	IP01003	0.84
Charlie's old flame accuses Charlie of being the father of her ill-behaved son. Charlie spends time with him when he realizes it might impress The Waitress. Meanwhile, Mac and Dennis fake being involved in the "right to life vs. pro-choice" debate (with Mac siding on "right to life" and Dennis siding on "pro-choice") to pick up women: Mac attends an anti-abortion protest and has sex with a protestor, while Dennis decides to attend the next protest to meet pro-choice women. Dennis climbs a fence separating the two sides and incites a food fight. Mac's new girlfriend dumps him. Charlie's ex reveals Charlie is not the father.
3	3	"Underage Drinking: A National Concern"	Dan Attias	Story by : Charlie Day & Rob McElhenney; Teleplay by : Rob McElhenney	August 16, 2005	IP01006	N/A
After Paddy's has a busy night due to an underage crowd, Mac decides to make Paddy's Pub a safe haven for teenage drinkers. Dee is invited on a date by a high schooler, Trey, while Dennis, Mac, and Charlie work at the bar. Mac and Charlie buy alcohol for a house party. Charlie and Dee are asked to prom, and after Dennis is blackmailed into attending by Tammy, they all decide to go. At a pre-prom party they host at Paddy's, Tammy and Trey get back together and all the teenagers leave.
4	4	"Charlie Has Cancer"	Rob McElhenney	Rob McElhenney	August 23, 2005	IP01004	N/A
Charlie tells Dennis he might have cancer, who tells Mac and Dee. They decide to find a woman to sleep with Charlie. Dennis decides the Waitress will sleep with Charlie out of pity after he sees her wearing a Livestrong bracelet; after he tells the Waitress about Charlie, she hits on Dennis and they sleep together. Mac pays her to sleep with Charlie as well. Dee's friend, Artemis, auditions for a waitressing job at Paddy's. Charlie tells Dennis he lied about having cancer so the Waitress would like him and reveals they never had sex. Mac starts dating a trans woman, and after accidentally punching her is chased by two men for committing a hate crime. The Waitress refuses to return the money.
5	5	"Gun Fever"	Dan Attias	Story by : Glenn Howerton & Rob McElhenney; Teleplay by : Glenn Howerton	August 30, 2005	IP01005	N/A
After Paddy's is robbed, Mac and Dennis decide to buy a gun. Dee's new boyfriend Colin encourages the idea and takes her to a firing range. Charlie's landlord Hwang demands that he pay the rent. He joins Dennis and Mac in shooting the new gun and then takes the gun home to use to intimidate Hwang. Dennis suspects that Colin is the robber so they bait him into robbing Paddy's again; Dennis shoots an intruder at Paddy's, who turns out to be Charlie trying to pay his rent. While the gang take Charlie to the hospital, Colin robs the bar again.
6	6	"The Gang Finds a Dead Guy"	Dan Attias	Story by : Charlie Day & Glenn Howerton & Rob McElhenney; Teleplay by : Rob McElhenney	September 6, 2005	IP01007	N/A
Mac and Dee find a dead old man at Paddy's. The man's attractive granddaughter Rebecca shows up, and Mac and Dennis vie for her affection by claiming they knew him. When Dee and Charlie visit Dee's grandfather at a nursing home; Dee has a panic attack and leaves Charlie alone with him, who thinks he is Dennis and asks him to bring him a box from storage. At Rebecca's grandfather's funeral, Dennis and Mac bring a group of homeless men to pose as his friends and Dennis gives a speech. Charlie discovers the box is full of Nazi memorabilia and a uniform, and after he and Mac unsuccessfully try to sell it to a museum, they burn it. Dennis brags that he slept with Rebecca, and Mac tells him about his grandfather.
7	7	"Charlie Got Molested"	John Fortenberry	Story by : Charlie Day & Rob McElhenney; Teleplay by : Rob McElhenney	September 13, 2005	IP01002	1.09
When the gang hears news of their former gym teacher Coach Murray getting arrested for molesting his students, including the McPoyle brothers, Charlie suddenly gets nervous and Dee and Dennis conclude that Charlie might have been one of the victims. Meanwhile Mac becomes jealous that he was not a victim. Charlie confronts the McPoyles, knowing they are lying about having been molested; they remind him he drunkenly gave them the idea a year ago, and insist he also claim abuse. Mac visits Coach Murray at his home and unsuccessfully hits on him. Dee and Dennis tell Charlie's mother he was molested, and she stages an intervention with the McPoyles, forcing Charlie to falsely admit to being molested. The McPoyles take Charlie to the police station to make a report, who exposes their scheme.

== Reception ==
The first season received positive reviews. On Rotten Tomatoes, it has an approval rating of 78% with an average score of 7.9 out of 10 based on 18 reviews. The website's critical consensus reads, "It's Always Sunny in Philadelphia's coarse humor and shabby style may be rough around the edges, but this sinful sitcom wrings a surprising amount [of] charm from its band of charmless underachievers."

== Home media ==
It's Always Sunny in Philadelphia: Seasons 1 & 2
Set details	Special features
17 episodes; 3-disc DVD set (Region 1 & 4); Technical specifications: Full Frame (1.33:1); English Dolby Surround; English, French, and Spanish subtitles	Scenes from the Original Pilot; Two audio commentaries: "Mac Bangs Dennis' Mom" "Hundred Dollar Baby": Two featurettes: Sunny Side Up Making-of Fox Movie Channel Presents Making A Scene: It's Always Sunny in Philadelphia: The Gang F**ks Up outtakes; Kaitlin Olson audition tapes
Release dates
Region 1	Region 4
September 4, 2007	June 2, 2009
