= Kung Fu Panda: The Paws of Destiny =

Animated television series

- Genre: Action-adventure; Comedy
- Based on: Kung Fu Panda
- Developed by: Elliott Owen
- Voices of: Mick Wingert; Chrissy Metz; James Hong; Amy Hill; Haley Tju; Laya DeLeon Hayes; Gunnar Sizemore; Makana Say
- Composer: Leo Birenberg
- Country of origin: United States
- Original language: English
- No. of seasons: 1 (2 parts)
- No. of episodes: 26

Production
- Executive producers: Mitch Watson; Elliott Owen; Lane Lueras
- Running time: 23 minutes
- Production company: DreamWorks Animation Television

Original release
- Network: Amazon Prime Video
- Release: November 16, 2018 – July 5, 2019

Related
- Kung Fu Panda: Legends of Awesomeness; Kung Fu Panda: The Dragon Knight

Kung Fu Panda: The Paws of Destiny is an American animated television limited series produced by DreamWorks Animation Television and premiered its first "part" on Amazon Prime Video on November 16, 2018. Taking place after the events of Kung Fu Panda 3 (2016) and before The Dragon Knight (2022-2023). The second and final part was released on July 5, 2019. It is the second television series in the Kung Fu Panda franchise following Kung Fu Panda: Legends of Awesomeness. In 2018, Mitch Watson, the show's producer, confirmed that Mick Wingert would reprise his role from Legends of Awesomeness as Po.

== Plot ==
Set after General Kai's defeat, the series follows the Dragon Warrior Po the panda on a fresh adventure featuring four panda kids (Nu Hai, Jing, Bao, and Fan Tong); who happen upon a mystical cave beneath the Panda Village. The panda kids accidentally absorb the chi of ancient and powerful Kung Fu warriors known as the four constellations; Blue Dragon, Black Tortoise, White Tiger and Red Phoenix – each of which somehow are with the panda who is lacking that particular quality. They realize they are now destined to save the world from an evil force (Jindiao); who wishes to take over the world and steal the chi of the four constellations, landing Po with his biggest challenge yet – teaching this ragtag band of kids how to wield their new-found Kung Fu powers. They also defend the Forbidden City against an evil Komodo dragon named Shi Long along with an ancient evil demon.

== Voice cast ==
- Mick Wingert as Po / Black Tortoise / Male Panda No. 1 / Yak Bandit Leader / Dim / Yak Bouncer No. 2 / Chow Guard No. 4 Gongmen City Police Wolf No. 1
- Haley Tju as Nu Hai
- Laya Deleon Hayes as Jing
- Gunnar Sizemore as Bao
- Makana Say as Fan Tong
- Chrissy Metz as Mei Mei
- Piotr Michael as Oogway / Wong / Wing / Bingwen / Emperor Kang Zi / Dum Dum / Pika Mobster / Chow Guard No. 1 / Salamander Henchman No. 1 Lead Chow Guard
- Christopher Swindle as Li Shan / Zang / Sum / Ping / Chow Guard No. 3 / Yak Brawler / Gongmen City Police Wolf No. 2 / Imperial Guard No. 1
- James Hong as Mr. Ping / Chow Guard No. 8
- Steve Blum as Jindiao / Red Phoenix / Pious Chan
- Amy Hill as Grandma Panda / Spyglass Monk
- Cherise Boothe as Jade Tusk / Huifang / Female Panda No. 1 / Tahr No. 2 / Gongmen City Police Wolf Leader / Rabbit Artisan Rabbit
- James Sie as Bunnidharma / White Tiger / Chong / Friend Vulture / Sun Wukong / Shirinking Sun Wukong / Chow Guard No. 7 / Giant Sun
- JB Blanc as Blue Dragon / General Fang / Chow Guard No. 5 / Tahr Tavern Owner / Imperial Guard No. 2 / Juan
- Grey Griffin as The Xin / Laoshu / Suyin / Tuoluo Seller Rabbit
- Jeff Bennett as Zhizhu / Yak Bouncer No. 1 / Tahr No. 1 / Mole Rat No. 3 / Rabbit Bandit Leader
- Mitch Watson as Yaoguai Demon
- Michael Rivkin as Rooster / Chow Guard No. 6
- Lacey Chabert as Princess Xiao / Panda Mother
- Sumalee Montano as Shi Long / Young Shi Long / Rabbit Villager / Rabbit Servant / Assassin / Rabbit Citizen
- Elisa Gabrielli as Baigujing / White Bone Demon / Dark Shadow / Old Lady Tahr / Porcupine Assassin
- Jimmie Wood as Qilin / Chow Guard No. 2
- Betsy Sodaro as Makesi / Mole Rat No. 1 / Mole Rat No. 2 / Pika Kid

== Episodes ==
Series overview
Season	Episodes		Originally released
1	26	13	November 16, 2018
1	26	13	July 4, 2019

=== Part 1 (2018) ===
No.	Title	Directed by	Written by	Storyboarded by	Original release date
1	"Enter the Dragon Master"	Lane Lueras	Elliott Owen	Alice Herring & Lane Lueras	November 16, 2018
Set some time after General Kai's defeat, panda children Nu-Hai, Jing, Bao, and Fan-Tong are in trouble for knocking over the Sacred Peach Statue that was to be blessed by Po, now the Dragon Master, at the annual Peach Blossom Festival. Determined to make it up to the villagers, Nu-Hai sets the group to the task of returning the statue. As they try to push it onto the lift, the statue rolls down and falls into a cave along with the kids. Nu-Hai recognizes the cave as the Temple of The Four Constellations. They find four pedestals, each with a giant statue. When Bao touches one to annoy Nu-Hai, chi radiates from the and enters the pandas. As the four run out of the cave screaming, they are watched by an unnamed Chinese water deer. The four shut themselves in Nu-Hai and Bao's room, the former freaking out over what just happened. Meanwhile, the water deer reports to another deer named Jade Tusk that she was beaten to the Temple of the Four Constellations by the pandas. The deers' master orders Jade Tusk to kill the monk. At Jade Tusk's urging, her master allows her to get the children. In the next scene, we see the four in the library asking Grandma who the Four Constellations were. Grandma explains that a thousand years ago, the Four Constellations were guardians of a sacred wellspring, but a dark chi master wanted its power for himself. The Four Constellations stopped him, and to protect the Chi Wellspring from those with evil ambitions, they hid it in the last place anyone would look, hoping their successors would continue their legacy. The Four run towards Po, trying to explain what happened at the Temple and asking to be taught kung-fu. Po declines, but when the kids keep pressuring him, he tries to run, only to be hit by a door and faint. Po awakes to see the spirit of his late Master Oogway, who tells him the universe has chosen him to teach the Four and they will die if he doesn't. We see Nu-Hai, Jing, Bao, and Fan-Tong running through the night hoping to reach Po and change his mind, but they're captured by the Poison Clan. Jade Tusk attempts to force the kids to open the Temple, but Po arrives to save them. Po bangs his head, leaving him vulnerable, when a chi blast erupts from the four panda kids. Now believing them, Po agrees to teach them kung fu.
2	"Blue Dragon Plays with Fire"	Lane Lueras	Elliott Owen	Annie Li & Byron Penaranda	November 16, 2018
Po goes around to wake up his new students for their first day of study, only to find them all rather high-strung. He then shows them where he intends to train them: a run-down building at the top of a long set of stairs. Po explains that they, like him, have been imbued with Hero's Chi, which typically only comes to one hero in a generation. He goes over the character of each member of the Four Constellations, only to find that the kids have personalities that are the direct opposite of those they have inherited. Meanwhile, at the Most Auspicious Temple of the Heavenward Plumblossom Serene Moonbeam, the bearded vulture Jindiao is giving a lecture on the original Dragon Warrior and how he was sustained by Chi. The seemingly decrepit master mentions that his own life and vitality is sustained by Chi, but is shocked to see Jade Tusk. He rebukes her, but then learns that she has the whereabouts of Pious Chan. He decides to visit their "old friend" himself, though not before the two discuss their boisterous subordinate Huifang. Upon returning to his training hall, Po finds that the kids have cleaned the place up and decides to see what abilities they already possess. Their efforts are less than stellar, but Po is encouraging and informs them of his intent to research the constellations more thoroughly. Elsewhere, Jade Tusk and her underlings attack the wise old tahr Pious Chan, but the battle is broken off by the appearance of Jindiao. Believing the elderly abbot to be a friend, Chan offers his help, only for Jindiao to steal his Chi. Back at Panda Village, the kids get out of school, with Nu Hai asserting herself as the group's leader despite the others' objections. A duck messenger then arrives seeking help for Wu-Ran Village, and the kids go to defend it without Po's help. Po, meanwhile, locates a scroll about the origins of the Constellations, only to learn what the kids have done. At the village, Nu Hai leads the others in attacking the bandits, but their Hero Chi fails to materialize. As the four are menaced by the bandits, Blue Dragon's Chi manifests to Nu Hai, prompting her to lead them in evading the villains, but only she escapes. As the others are subdued, Nu-Hai panics as she struggles to determine what to do. The voice of Blue Dragon urges her to relax; she obeys, which lets her unlock her power and strike down one of the bandits. Po then arrives to back up his students, handily defeating the remaining enemies. Nu Hai admits that it was her own recklessness that led her team into trouble, and Po commends her honesty. He then reveals that the original Four Constellations were farmers and shopkeepers; as such, his students should not be discouraged by their own humble origins. Meanwhile, Jindiao has gained renewed youth by draining Pious Chan's Chi.
3	"Blade of the Red Phoenix"	Johnny Castuciano	Elliott Owen	Rihanna Williams, Emma Hoffard & Mike Tisserand	November 16, 2018
4	"The Intruder Flies a Crooked Path"	James Wootton	Michael Ryan	Tom Galvin, Candice Prince, Victor Sampaio & Rhianna Williams	November 16, 2018
5	"A Fistful of Herbs"	Lane Lueras	Benjamin Lapides	Annie Jingyi Li & Byron Penaranda	November 16, 2018
6	"Poison in the Pit of the Plum"	Johnny Castuciano	Johanna Stein	Rhianna Williams, Emma Hoffard & Mike Tisserand	November 16, 2018
7	"Big Trouble in Panda Village"	James Wootton	Elliott Owen	Tom Galvin, Candice Prince & Victor Sampaio	November 16, 2018
After Jindiao pushes Po down the supposedly endless tunnel, the other Four Constellations discover that Jing has been under the influence of JinDiao's control and flee to figure out a plan to help her as well as to protect their own chi. After multiple attempts to flee, the three are cornered like a trapped mouse. Jindiao demands their chi and when they refuse, he puts the whole village to sleep and says that they will wake once he has their chi. With no other options, the three agree to give up their chi and are put into a house until Jindiao is ready to drain them of their chi. Meanwhile, Po awakens in a cave with a questionable sane rabbit, Bunnidharma, who helps him to figure out how to solve his problem of losing his chi and how he can get it back. The Four Constellations are aware that Po is still alive as their hands glow to indicate that his chi is active.
8	"Secrets Lost to Shadow"	Mike Mullen	Mitch Watson	Annie Jingyi Li & Daniel Villa de Rey	November 16, 2018
As Po continues to attempt to restore his stolen Chi, the students find a way to escape the village after being put in a locked-up house with wards against the use of Chi. After tricking a guard into opening the door, the four escape only to run into Nu Hai and Bao's Grandma and Mr. Ping. Discovering that the sleep spell that put the entire village only works on Pandas (The Grandma said it didn't affect her because of her dementia), the four look for a way to escape the village without being noticed. Grandma tells them about a series of tunnels beneath the village that allows to search for Master Po, who they truly believe to be alive after watching him being thrown down a supposedly bottomless well. Meanwhile, Jindiao, with his newly acquired powers from the children, goes in search of the Wellspring at the hideout of the Four Constellations. Back in the underground cave, Po discovers that Bunnidharma is not telling the whole truth about what his connection is to Po and Oogway, only to discover his connection runs deeper than expected.
9	"Out of the Cave and Onto Thin Ice"	Lane Lueras & Rhianna Williams	Benjamin Lapides	Johnny Castuciano, Emma Hoffard & Mike Tisserand	November 16, 2018
10	"Return of the Four Constellations"	Lane Lueras & James Wootton	Nicole Belisle	Tom Galvin, Annie Jingyi Li, Candice Prince & Victor Sampaio	November 16, 2018
11	"Unholy Dragon Returns to the Mountains"	Mike Mullen	Johanna Stein	Crystal Kan, & Annie Jingyi Li & Daniel Villa de Rey	November 16, 2018
12	"Sacrifice at the Edge of Time"	Rhianna Williams	Mitch Watson	Emma Hoffard, Annie Jingyi Li, Kevin Slawinski & Mike Tisserand	November 16, 2018
13	"End of the Dragon Master"	James Wootton	Elliott Owen	Tom Galvin, Annie Jingyi Li, Candice Prince & Victor Sampaio	November 16, 2018

=== Part 2 (2019) ===
No.	Title	Directed by	Written by	Storyboarded by	Original release date
14	"Journey to the East"	Mike Mullen	Benjamin Lapides	Crystal Kan, Annie Jingyi Li & Daniel Villa de Rey	July 4, 2019
15	"Curse of the Monkey King"	Rhianna Williams	Johanna Stein	Bradley Cayford, Emma Hoffard, Annie Jingyi Li & Kevin Slawinski	July 4, 2019
16	"A Game of Fists"	Lane Lueras	Lindsay Kerns	Tom Galvin, Annie Jingyi Li, Candice Prince & Victor Sampaio	July 4, 2019
17	"The Beast of the Wasteland"	Mike Mullen	Nicole Belisle	Chris Jimenez, Crystal Kan, Annie Jingyi Li & Daniel Villa de Rey	July 4, 2019
18	"Danger in the Forbidden City"	Rhianna Williams	Mitch Watson	Bradley Cayford, Emma Hoffard, Annie Jingyi Li & Kevin Slawinski	July 4, 2019
19	"The Battle(s) of Gongmen Bay"	Lane Lueras	Elliott Owen	Matt Engstrom, George Gipson, Zheng Kang, Annie Jingyi Li & Luther McLaurin	July 4, 2019
20	"Gongmen City Hustle"	Mike Mullen	Benjamin Lapides	Chris Jimenez, Crystal Kan, Annie Jingyi Li & Daniel Villa de Rey	July 4, 2019
21	"Night of the White Bone Demon"	Rhianna Williams	Johanna Stein	Bradley Cayford, Emma Hoffard, Chris Jimenez, Annie Jingyi Li & Kevin Slawinski	July 4, 2019
22	"Rise of the Empress"	Tom Galvin	Lindsay Kerns	Gena Buto, Annie Jingyi Li & Victor Sampaio	July 4, 2019
23	"Bridge Over Troubled Lava"	Mike Mullen	Nicole Belisle	Chris Jimenez, Crystal Kan, Annie Jingyi Li & Daniel Villa de Rey	July 4, 2019
24	"House of Flying Pandas"	Rhianna Williams	Bethany Armstrong Johnson	Bradley Cayford, Emma Hoffard, Annie Jingyi Li & Kevin Slawinski	July 4, 2019
25	"Coronation of the Iron Goddess"	Tom Galvin	Mitch Watson	Gena Buto, Annie Jingyi Li & Victor Sampaio	July 4, 2019
26	"The Invincible Armor"	Mike Mullen	Elliott Owen	Chris Jimenez, Crystal Kan, Annie Jingyi Li & Daniel Villa de Rey	July 4, 2019
The White Bone Demon ate Shi Long and then attacked causing Rooster and his henchmen Wing and Wong to flee. The White Bone Demon was about to squish the group but was saved by a giant Sun Wukong. Nu Hai puts on the crown to control him, and throws the White Bone Demon out of Empress Xiao's kingdom. The gang rides on a giant Sun Wukong to the desert, and find the White Bone Demon and her army of terracotta warriors there. Sun Wukong and the demon have a little fight with each other. When the monkey tries to smash the red jade, he starts shrinking due to him loving red jade. The White Bone Demon says goodbye before flicking the monkey king away and tells Po that he and his students are a legend and will kill them. Suddenly, she starts sinking into the sand. Rooster and his henchmen come out of a pile of rocks and he claims that he proved his "incredible intellect." It is then revealed that Makesi and her friends caused the White Bone Demon to sink, and they, alongside Qilin and the Poison Clan defeat the terracotta warriors. Rooster hops off his henchmen's hands and shows he has changed before getting attacked by a terracotta warriors. The group does all they can to stop the demon but are overpowered by the warrior. Bao hits the demon with his Black Tortoise chi, but the demon flicks him away, much to his annoyance. Fan Tong uses his Red Phoenix chi to throw Xiao close to the demon. Xiao uses her jade chain to break the demon's red jade heart causing a chain reaction which destroys her and the warriors. The panda kids help each other out of the wreckage. Xiao thanks Fan Tong for helping her protect her kingdom with Bao making a "good job" look, while Po, Sun Wukong, and Rooster fight over the crown. Po gives the crown back to the monkey and he makes a joke by telling him the followers just send him where he's sent, which annoys Po. Xiao finds Shi Long who was lucky to survive and tells the lizard they will fix her, which she says, "I don’t deserve to be fixed." But Xiao still lets Shi Long get healed since she's her sister. Jing comes over to help but Rooster blocks her and tries to convince her not to heal Shi Long because of her actions and tomfoolery. But Jing tells Rooster that healing people is "what she does" and kicks him away. She then uses her chi to heal Shi Long and Shi Long is now fixed. Xiao forgives Shi Long, but still takes her to jail. Grandma Panda and the refugees came out of the wreckage and all went home, unaware that a female bat (who is the actual White Bone Demon) is emerging out of the body grinning evilly before disappearing into the body. The gang suddenly realize that the red jade was about to explode just as Sun Wukong flees and the jade explodes, giving chi to everyone around China and restoring the Wellspring. The Wellspring was then restored and Rooster decided to retire from being a criminal. He, Wing and Wong then noticed a cart full of corn and they went to eat it. Meanwhile, Xiao is made empress and Jade Tusk and the Poison Clan are her new servants while Shi Long was placed in the same cage Xiao was in. Meanwhile, the Panda Village congratulates the Four Constellations and Po, who says that there are still more adventures out there.

== Awards and nominations ==
Year	Award	Category	Nominee	Result	Ref
2019	Annie Awards	Best Animated Television/Broadcast Production For Children		Nominated	
2020	Kidscreen Awards	Best New Series		Won	
2020	Daytime Emmy Awards	Outstanding Directing for an Animated Program	Michael Mullen; Charlie Adler	Nominated	
