= Lucky (2019 film) =

2019 American animated film

- Genre: Adventure; Comedy
- Written by: Bart Coughlin; Bill Motz; Bob Roth
- Directed by: Casey Burke Leonard
- Starring: Mark Hamill; Kira Kosarin; Ron Funches; Flula Borg; Gunnar Sizemore
- Composer: Brad Breeck
- Country of origin: United States
- Original language: English

Production
- Executive producers: David J. Steinberg; Darren Thomas; Jason Meier
- Producer: MacGregor Middleton
- Editor: Christopher Hink
- Running time: 40 minutes
- Production company: Nickelodeon Animation Studio

Original release
- Network: Nickelodeon
- Release: March 8, 2019

Lucky is an American animated made-for-television urban fantasy adventure comedy film produced by Nickelodeon Animation Studio. An original Nickelodeon film, it features the voices of Mark Hamill, Kira Kosarin, Ron Funches, Flula Borg, and Gunnar Sizemore. The film follows an unlucky leprechaun who goes on a quest with his three best friends, Shannon, Sammy, and Reggie, to retrieve the pot of gold stolen from his family in order to restore their luck.

It premiered on Nickelodeon on March 8, 2019.

== Plot ==
Generations before the main story, the McSweeney clan loses their priceless pot of gold to a marauding dragon, condemning every family member to chronic misfortune. Hap McSweeney, the clan's eternally optimistic youngest leprechaun, endures collapsing houses and classroom ridicule yet remains determined to restore his family's fortune.

During a school excursion to Fortune City, Hap and his three best friends—Shannon, a nimble elf; Sammy, a gentle giant; and Reggie, a gadget-loving gremlin—discover that legendary tycoon Houlihan safeguards a familiar cauldron of shimmering coins inside his high-tech mansion. Convinced the treasure is rightfully theirs, the quartet plan a heist that mirrors the intricate maneuvers of an Ocean's Eleven caper. Each stage of their break-in, from cracking enchanted vaults to outwitting clockwork gnome sentries, is complicated by Hap's relentless bad luck, which triggers pratfalls, alarms, and chain-reaction mishaps throughout the labyrinthine estate.

Hap and his friends locate the pot of gold in Houlihan's basement cave, and Hap retrieves it, ending his family's bad luck curse. But Houlihan shows up transformed into his powered-up dragon form and kidnaps Shannon, Sammy, and Reggie, and threatens to drop them into the lava below. Forced to protect his friends, Hap drops the pot into the lava, destroying it, bringing bad luck back to his family, but also causing Houlihan to fall into a spell of bad luck where he is struck by a bolt of lightning. In the aftermath, Hap learns that having bad luck is not a big deal as long as you remain optimistic and take extra caution to observe the world around you.

== Voice cast ==
- Gunnar Sizemore as Hap McSweeney
- Kira Kosarin as Shannon
- Ron Funches as Sammy
- Flula Borg as Reggie
- Mark Hamill as Harry Houlihan
- Piotr Michael as the narrator

== Production ==
Director Casey Leonard had no prior experience in working on computer animation and films, but joined the production after co-writer David Steinberg presented him with the film's original draft, to which he "fell in love with [...the] story". He summed the film as a mix of "comedy[...] heist, and[...] all action." "It's really fun! At its core, Lucky is about friendship. All the luck in the world's got nothing on love," said Leonard. He also mentioned that the film was "challenging" and "exciting". The film took about 14 months to develop.

Production services included storyboarding and rigging at Nickelodeon Animation Studio, with 30 crew members involved. Animation services were done at Bardel Entertainment for four months, with 25 animators involved.

== Awards and nominations ==
Award	Category	Nominee(s)	Result	Ref.
2019 Golden Reel Awards	Golden Reel Award for Outstanding Achievement in Sound Editing – Sound Effects, Foley, Music, Dialogue and ADR for Non-Theatrical Animated Long Form Broadcast Media	Jeff Shiffman (supervising sound editor); Tess Fournier, Brad Meyer (sound effects editors); Carol Ma (foley editor); Michael Wessner (dialogue editor)	Nominated	
