= Enslavement: The True Story of Fanny Kemble =

- Genre: Drama
- Screenplay by: Christopher Lofton
- Directed by: James Keach
- Starring: Jane Seymour; Keith Carradine; James Keach
- Theme music composer: Charles Bernstein
- Countries of origin: United States; Canada
- Original language: English

Production
- Cinematography: Roland Smith
- Editor: Heidi Scharfe
- Running time: 115 mins
- Production companies: Catfish Productions; Hallmark Entertainment Distribution Company

Original release
- Network: Showtime
- Release: April 23, 2000

Enslavement: The True Story of Fanny Kemble is a 2000 American television film starring Jane Seymour and directed by James Keach. It depicts the life of British actress and abolitionist Fanny Kemble, who sees first-hand the horrors of slavery when she marries an American plantation owner. Her published diaries in the form of personal accounts are shown to influence the British government's decision to withhold support of the Confederacy during the American Civil War. Keith Carradine co-stars as Fanny's husband Pierce Butler, with Keach, Adewale Akinnuoye-Agbaje, and Colin Fox also appearing.

It first aired on the American television network Showtime on April 23, 2000. Enslavement received generally negative reviews; critics focused on the paucity of historical accuracy as well as its lack of subtlety. Composer Charles Bernstein earned a Primetime Emmy Award nomination for "Outstanding Music Composition for a Miniseries, Movie, or a Special".

== Plot summary ==
Set in the nineteenth century, the film depicts the real-life story of British actress and abolitionist Fanny Kemble. When Kemble leaves her successful acting career to marry American lawyer and slave owner Pierce Butler, she becomes horrified by the treatment of the enslaved people. Her efforts to improve the lives of her husband's slaves result in their eventual divorce and the loss of access to her two daughters. Fanny later publishes her journals and their first-hand accounts of slavery, helping influence the British government's decision to withhold support of the Confederacy during the American Civil War.

== Cast ==
- Jane Seymour as Fanny Kemble
- Keith Carradine as Pierce Butler
- James Keach as Dr. Huston
- Adewale Akinnuoye-Agbaje as Joe
- Sharon Washington as Psyche
- Colin Fox as John Quincy Adams
- Francois Klanfer as Daniel Webster
- Eugene Byrd as Jack
- Peter Mensah as Quaka
- Gerard Parkes as Charles Kemble
- Bernard Brown as Sam Swift
- Rick Demas as Brutus
- Arlene Duncan as Harriet
- Lili Francks as Aunt Jerusalem
- Janet-Laine Green as Elizabeth Sedgwick
- Catherine Hayos as Julia
- Kayla Perlmutter as Young Sarah
- Brett Porter as Owen Parker
- Jackie Richardson as Daphnie
- Richard Yearwood as Habersham

== Production ==
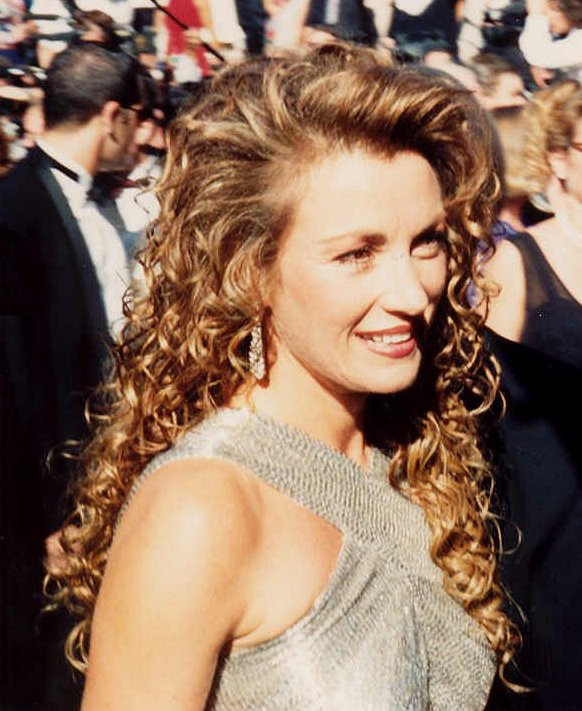
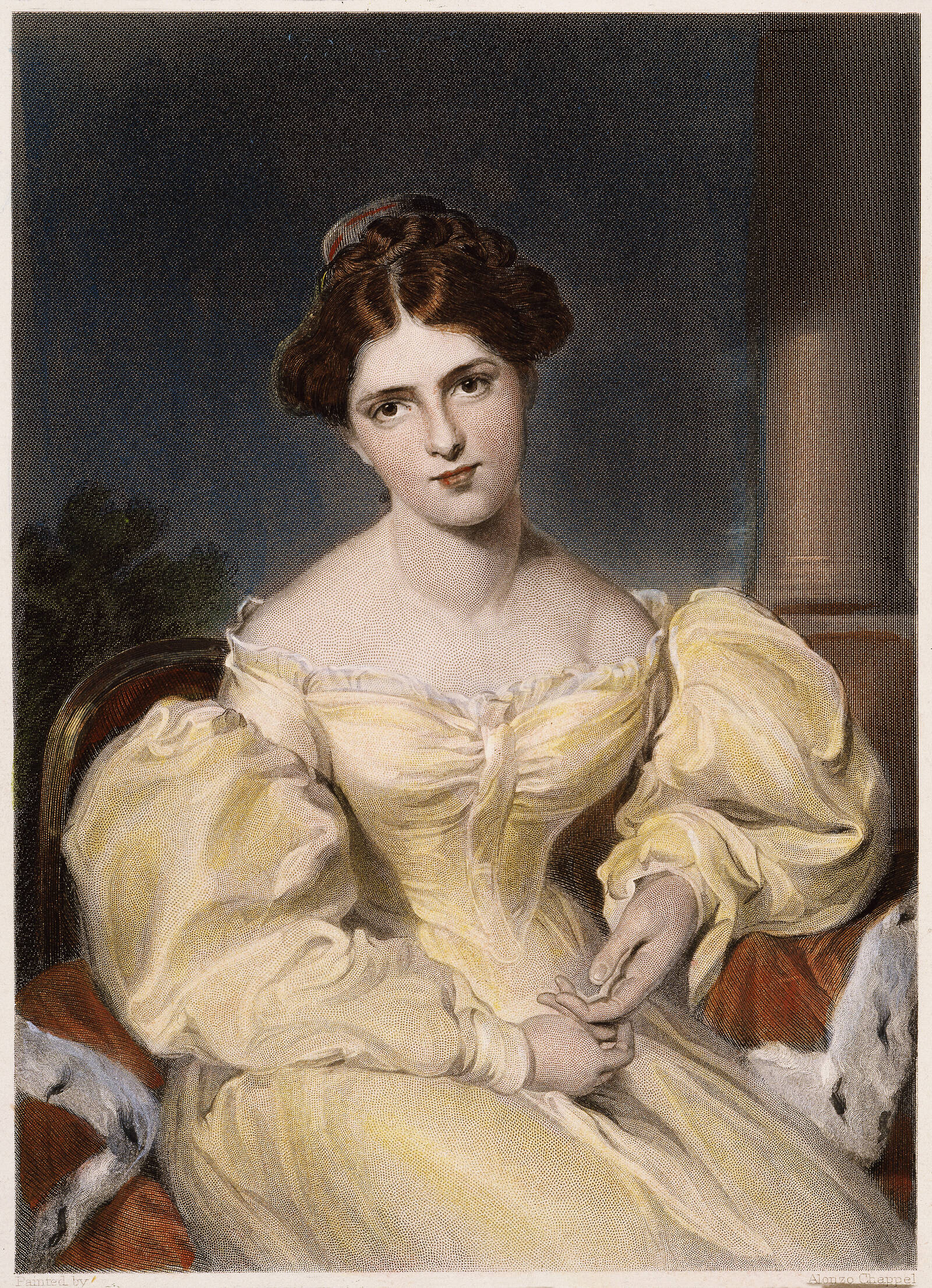
Jane Seymour (left) portrayed Fanny Kemble, a real-life actress and abolitionist

In 2000, it was reported that Dr. Quinn, Medicine Woman actress Jane Seymour and her husband James Keach would be co-starring and co-producing a television film about the life of real-life abolitionist Fanny Kemble. Seymour had not heard of Fanny Kemble before being approached for the project, though she was aware of the Kembles for being "a very famous [acting] family." She and Keach researched Fanny's life and found that "there was very little research to be found in America, but tons of it in England and Canada." As a result, they felt that Kemble's life story would provide a different perspective of the historical period in the US. Seymour and Keach hired Christopher Lofton to write the film, and the three worked for five years before it was made. Seymour believed that the delay in securing financing stemmed partly from two factors: companies were wary of the cost associated with period dramas as well as the lack of familiarity Americans had with Kemble's life.

One of their goals was to depict several different types of enslavement. Seymour described her character as "a strong, willful woman [who] fought against being enslaved by the man she fell in love with and married. When she saw slavery on his plantation, she fought against that, too." Actor Keith Carradine, one of Keach's good friends, was cast as Fanny's husband. Keach also directed, yet another such collaboration between him and his wife. The film was shot mostly in Canada.

== Reception ==
On April 23, 2000, Enslavement: The True Story of Fanny Kemble premiered on the American television network Showtime. It received generally negative reviews from film and television critics. TV Guide's Robert Pardi critiqued Seymour's performance for "lack[ing] the emotional depth that might have transformed the fustian presentation of this material. Instead of giving a nuanced performance, Seymour seems content to impress viewers with her poised demeanor as she sullies her hoopskirts in the cause of freedom." David Kronke of the Los Angeles Daily News criticized Enslavement for lacking subtlety and opined that it "can't decide whether it's a story about race or just a standard-issue bodice-ripper." Writing for the New York Daily News, David Bianculli blamed the screenwriter for the film's faults, explaining that "Lofton writes dialogue that sounds like unvarnished tracts from an 'author's message' manifesto – and in Seymour's Kemble, he has created a character so noble and modern-thinking she makes Dr. Quinn, Medicine Woman look like a backwoods savage." Tom Jicha of the Sun-Sentinel faulted the film for being riddled with "cliched scenes of plantation atrocities" that "frequently cross the line between realism and titillation," such as an early scene in which a black couple are attacked for having sex.

The historical accuracy of the film has also been a source for complaint. In his book Echoes of War: A Thousand Years of Military History in Popular Culture, Michael C. C. Adams cited Enslavement as an example of a movie that claims historical accuracy while "gratuitously and radically distorting" the truth. The Seattle Times negatively reviewed the film for "exaggerating and sensationalizing" Kemble's life, while Michael Kilian of the Chicago Tribune criticized the portrayal of John Quincy Adams as a racist. Kilian did however commend it for depicting the "horrors of slave life on a sea island plantation [as] every bit as compelling as those contained in the journal Kemble kept and later published in England during the Civil War – a book that helped turn British public opinion against recognition of the South."

Despite its negative reception, the film received several nominations. Composer Charles Bernstein earned a Primetime Emmy Award nomination for Outstanding Music Composition for a Miniseries, Movie, or a Special. The Art Directors Guild gave a nomination for Excellence in Production Design for a Television Movie or Mini-Series to production designer Eric Fraser and art director Astra Burka. Akinnuoye-Agbaje received a nomination for Best Supporting Actor in Network/Cable at the 2001 Black Reel Awards.

== See also ==
- List of films featuring slavery
