= Dirty (2005 film) =

2005 crime–drama film directed by Chris Fisher

- Theatrical release poster
- Directed by: Chris Fisher
- Written by: Chris Fisher; Gil Reavilsxl; Eric Saks
- Produced by: David Hillary; Timothy Wayne Peternel; Ash R. Shah
- Starring: Cuba Gooding Jr. Clifton Collins Jr. Keith David; Wyclef Jean; Wood Harris; Robert LaSardo; Lobo Sebastian; Judy Reyes; Chris Mulkey; Khleo Thomas; Aimee Garcia; Nick Gonzalez; Brian White; Tory Kittles; Jim Ortlieb; Taboo; Cole Hauser
- Cinematography: Eliot Rockett
- Edited by: Tom Sanders; Miklos Wright
- Music by: Ryan Beveridge
- Production companies: Silver Nitrate Pictures; Destination Films; Deviant Films
- Distributed by: Sony Pictures Home Entertainment
- Release date: November 9, 2005
- Running time: 97 minutes
- Country: United States
- Languages: English; Spanish
- Budget: $3 million
- Box office: $274,245

Dirty is a 2005 American crime film directed by Chris Fisher. The film stars Cuba Gooding Jr. and Clifton Collins Jr. The film was released in the United States on November 9, 2005.

== Plot ==
Armando Sancho (Clifton Collins Jr.) is a former Los Angeles gang member who has transitioned into law enforcement. Sancho, however, who is surrounded by corruption, finds that life as a police officer is just as morally bankrupt as life as a gangster. After being implicated in the shooting of an innocent man himself, Sancho is then pressured to testify against his loose-cannon friend and partner, Salim Adel (Cuba Gooding Jr.), who has a history of abusing citizens.

== Cast ==
- Cuba Gooding Jr. as Officer Salim Adel
- Clifton Collins Jr. as Officer Armando Sancho
- Keith David as Captain Spain
- Wyclef Jean as Damian Baine
- Wood Harris as Brax
- Robert LaSardo as Roland
- Lobo Sebastian as Manny
- Judy Reyes as Bryant
- Chris Mulkey as Carlson
- Khleo Thomas as Splooge
- Aimee Garcia as Rita
- Nick Gonzalez as Officer Rodriguez
- Brian White as Officer Sayed
- Tory Kittles as Officer Wallace
- Jim Ortlieb as Husband
- Taboo as Ramirez
- Cole Hauser as Lieutenant
- Brittany Daniel as Tatiana
- Kevin Grevioux as Daddy
- Terry Kennedy as Terry
- Jen Martinez as Jen
- Maurice "Mo" McRae as Tiptoes
- Nate Parker as Duster
- Tracy Phillips as Dancer
- Dax Ramgoolam as Elijah Adel
- Nichole Robinson as Boom Boom
- Tre Rogers as Pee Wee
- Telisha Shaw as Judith
- Soledad St. Hilaire as Sancho's Mom
- Gates McFadden as Wife

== Home media ==
The DVD of the movie was released in Region 1 in the United States on April 4, 2006, and also Region 2 in the United Kingdom on 5 June 2006 and it was distributed by Sony Pictures Home Entertainment.

== Reception ==
The review aggregation website Rotten Tomatoes gives the film a score of 21%, based on 28 reviews, with an average rating of 4.4 out of 10. The website's consensus reads, "Dirty is an unoriginal L.A. cop drama that wears its tired influences on its sleeves."
