= The Experts (1989 film) =

1989 film by Dave Thomas

- poster artwork by Drew Struzan
- Directed by: Dave Thomas
- Screenplay by: Nick Thiel; Steven Greene; Eric Alter
- Story by: Steven Greene; Eric Alter
- Produced by: James Keach
- Starring: John Travolta; Arye Gross; Kelly Preston; Deborah Foreman; James Keach; Charles Martin Smith
- Cinematography: Ronnie Taylor
- Edited by: Bud Molin
- Music by: Marvin Hamlisch
- Distributed by: Paramount Pictures
- Release date: January 13, 1989
- Running time: 94 minutes
- Country: United States
- Languages: English; Russian
- Budget: $13 million
- Box office: $169,203

The Experts is a 1989 American comedy film starring John Travolta, Arye Gross and Kelly Preston. It was written by Steven Greene, Eric Alter and Nick Thiel and directed by Dave Thomas. During production there were several uncredited rewrites of the script performed by Thomas at the request of Paramount chief Ned Tanen.

== Plot ==
In the Soviet Union on the eve of Perestroika, groups of potential Soviet spies are trained in a town made up to pass for "Indian Springs", Nebraska. The denizens of the town speak perfect English and go about their days as Americans to train the cadets to fit into American society. One of the trainers in this town, KGB agent Bob Smith, feels that the training is substandard as the town has failed to develop culturally since its inception and is stuck in the 1950s.

In order to rectify the situation, Smith hires New York City club-goers (and aspiring club-owners) Travis and Wendell Atwill to teach modern ways to the outdated town under the auspices of opening a nightclub. The two are drugged en route and wake up in Russia unaware they have left the United States. Travis and Wendell are bemused by the quaint ways of the town and dismayed when they see the location Smith has procured for them (a 50s-style tiki lounge), but they set to work remodeling the club to look more up to date for the 1980s, begin to make friends around the town and even start to date a couple of the trainees, Bonnie Grant and Jill.

At the urging of Travis and Wendell, Smith brings in a shipment of top-of-the-line accoutrements and entertainment to modernize the town. This does not sit well with town leader Jones and the town's minister Sparks. After a Fourth of July party in which the young people of the town (trainees and residents alike) trespass at a local lake to have a party at Travis and Wendell's urging, the two get lost and stumble upon a military base where everyone is speaking Russian and realize they are actually in the Soviet Union. The two decide to go to Bonnie and Jill for help despite knowing that they are spies, each one asserting that their feelings are real. While Bonnie reveals she has fallen in love with Travis and agrees to help him, Jill promptly turns them in.

While in prison, Travis and Wendell meet Yuri Kuznets, the pilot who flew the cargo plane that delivered the modern conveniences, and who was promptly imprisoned for it. Travis and Wendell are brought before the town, and under pain of death are made to renounce their country and democracy. When the two cannot bring themselves to do it and instead extol American life, they inspire the town residents, including Smith and Bonnie, to revolt and overthrow their leaders. After a shootout and subsequent chase (wherein Yuri has to go out on the wing as the plane taxis down the runway), the expatriates escape and make national headlines when they land in America and defect. Some time later the town's residents are living it up in New York City, but Travis is uneasy, thinking that they may be missing their old lifestyle. Realizing that there probably is a town in America just like the one in Russia, the whole group relocates to the actual Nebraska, and resume their lives as Americans, this time for real. Travis (with Bonnie in tow) and Wendell proceed to return to New York.

== Cast ==
- John Travolta as Travis
- Arye Gross as Wendell Atwill
- Kelly Preston as Bonnie Grant
- Deborah Foreman as Jill
- James Keach as Yuri Kuznets
- Jan Rubeš as Illyich
- Brian Doyle-Murray as Mr. Jones
- Charles Martin Smith as Bob Smith
- Mimi Maynard as Betty Smith
- Eve Brent as Aunt Thelma Lewis
- Rick Ducommun as Sparks
- Steve Levitt as Gil
- Tony Edwards as Nathan Cole
- David Mcalpine as Farmboy

== Reception ==
The Experts was a massive box office bomb; its budget was estimated at $13 million and domestic box office was only $169,203. Paramount executives had initially planned a wide release for the film but were so horrified with how bad the final version was, they scaled back the theatrical rollout to less than 100 theatres. The studio also pulled all of its advertising plans and put no effort into convincing theatres to keep the movie for more than a few weeks.

The film was panned by critics. Jack Sommersby from eFilm Critic wrote: "No, The Experts isn't likely to inspire world peace or serve as a building block for the cure for diabetes, but it goes down well enough and never makes the mistake of having Travis or Wendell 'mature' for the sole sake of doing so, and that's what makes them such a consistently-winning pair of heroes you can happily get behind." At the 10th Golden Raspberry Awards, John Travolta was nominated for the Golden Raspberry Award for Worst Actor of the Decade for his performances in this film, Perfect, Staying Alive and Two of a Kind.
