= Stacy Keach Sr. =

American actor (1914–2003)

- Born: Walter Stacy Keach; May 29, 1914; Chicago, Illinois, U.S.
- Died: February 13, 2003 (aged 88); Burbank, California, U.S.
- Burial place: Forest Lawn Memorial Park
- Occupation: Actor
- Years active: 1942–1997
- Spouse: Mary Cain Peckham (m. 1937)
- Children: Stacy Keach Jr. James Keach

Walter Stacy Keach Sr. (May 29, 1914 – February 13, 2003) was an American actor whose screen career spanned more than five decades.

== Biography ==
Keach was born in Chicago, Illinois. His career ranged from 1942 to 1997, with more than seventy movie and television appearances. He and his wife, the former Mary Cain Peckham, were members of the Peninsula Players summer theater program during the 1930s.

Keach appeared in a 1955 episode of The Lone Ranger. Keach also appeared as Sheriff Ben Mason in the 1957 episode "Last Chance" of the ABC/Warner Brothers Western television series Colt .45. That same year, he was cast as Jed Hammer in the episode "Trail's End" of the ABC/WB Western series Sugarfoot starring Will Hutchins. Keach was cast in 1957 and 1958 in five episodes of the NBC Western series The Californians as Bill Coleman. In 1959 he appeared on Wagon Train S3 E10 "The Danny Benedict Story" as General Phil Sheridan. He also appeared in several episodes of the series Maverick as various lawmen, including the episode "Ghost Rider" with James Garner.

Keach is probably best known for his role as Carlson in the NBC sitcom Get Smart. Carlson, a CONTROL scientist, was the inventor of such gadgets as an umbrella rifle (with a high-speed camera in the handle) and edible buttons—a parody of Q, who holds a similar position in the James Bond movies. By the time Keach took the role, however, he was the head of an industrial film company (a position he had held since 1948). Keach eventually gave up the role of Carlson when one too many clients were unable to reach him, and he had to respond, "I've been working in the CONTROL labs."

In 1964 he appeared on Perry Mason in the role of Lt. Gibson in "The Case of the Frightened Fisherman" and in 1965 he again appeared on Perry Mason in the role of the trial court judge in "The Case of the Cheating Chancellor." In 1961, he appeared as Dr. Walter in the very first episode of The Dick Van Dyke Show. In 1974 he appeared in an episode of the James Stewart legal drama Hawkins.

Keach's son, Stacy Keach Jr. (usually billed as "Stacy Keach", exactly like his father), enjoyed an acting career with far greater name recognition than his father's. The younger Keach is perhaps best known for starring in the title role of the Mike Hammer television series in the 1980s and 1990s. Another son, James Keach, an actor, director, and producer, was married to the actress Jane Seymour.

== Death ==
Keach died of congestive heart failure at the age of 88 in Burbank, California, and is buried at Forest Lawn Memorial Park.

== Filmography ==
Year	Title	Role	Notes
1942	Secret Enemies	Agent on Train with Cigarettes	Uncredited
1943	The Hard Way	First Theatrical Agent in Montage	Uncredited
1943	Truck Busters	Reporter	Uncredited
1950	The Du Pont Story	Pierre S. du Pont	\1955// The Lone Ranger Trigger Finger as the editor
1956	Cheyenne	Dutchman	Season 2/Episode 2: "The Long Winter"
1957	The Big Land	Rebel in Livery Stable	Uncredited
1958	Joy Ride	Wechsler	
1959	The FBI Story	Machine Gun Kelly	Uncredited
1963	Island of Love	Doctor	Uncredited
1964	Hamlet	Marcellus / Player #1	
1971	McMillan & Wife	Dr. Hinton	Episode: "Once Upon a Dead Man” (pilot)
1973	Detroit 9000		
1973	Adam-12	Tom Holmes	Episode: "West Valley Division"
1974	The Parallax View	Commission Spokesman #1	
1976	High Velocity	Carter	
1978	Big Wednesday	Old Man	
1981	Saturday the 14th	Attorney	
1982	Superstition	Rev. Maier	
1983	Lies	Uncle Charles	
1985	The Twilight Zone		Episode: Wong's Lost and Found Emporium
1986	Armed and Dangerous	Judge	
1990	Pretty Woman	Senator Adams	
1990	False Identity	Irving Campbell	
1994	Cobb	Jimmie Foxx	
