= Gunnar Sizemore =

American voice actor (born 2005)

- Born: Gunnar Lombardi Sizemore; January 9, 2005 (age 21); United States
- Education: Harvard College
- Occupation: Actor
- Years active: 2013–present
- Known for: Kung Fu Panda: The Paws of Destiny; Nashville; Everybody Still Hates Chris

Gunnar Lombardi Sizemore (born January 9, 2005) is an American actor whose work spans live-action television, animated series and feature films.

== Early life and education ==
Sizemore is the son of actor Kevin Sizemore and strength-coach Gina Lombardi. He is the nephew of Sukretas Bockil.

After attending secondary school in Los Angeles, he matriculated at Harvard College in 2023. While there, he directed Samuel Beckett's Krapp's Last Tape at the Loeb Experimental Theater and contributed lighting design to the student-written First-Year Musical, The Kids Are All Right. He also became a writer for The Harvard Lampoon, where he was affectionately nicknamed "Funny Gunnar Sizemore".

At the age of 8, Sizemore earned a Best Actor nomination at the 11th Annual 168 Film Festival for his performance in the short drama Heartfall (2013).

== Career ==
=== Acting ===
Sizemore's screen debut came with a recurring guest role on the Disney XD martial-arts comedy Kickin' It, followed in 2014 by his role as Micah Brenner on ABC's country-music drama Nashville.

=== Voice acting ===
He voiced Bao, one of the four panda cubs, in DreamWorks' CG series Kung Fu Panda: The Paws of Destiny, released globally on Amazon Prime Video in 2018 and 2019.

Other animated work includes lead character Happy McSweeney in Nickelodeon's holiday special Lucky (2019), Billy Billions in the 2016 Ben 10 reboot, and a supporting role in Hotel Transylvania 2.

In June 2024, Sizemore was announced as the voice of Greg Wuliger—Chris Rock's long-suffering best friend—in Everybody Still Hates Chris, the animated sequel to the cult sitcom Everybody Hates Chris commissioned by Comedy Central. He promoted the series alongside the principal cast at San Diego Comic-Con 2024.

== Filmography ==
=== Film ===
Year	Film	Role	Note
2014	The Book of Life	Ignacio	
2015	The Prophet	School Boy	
2015	Hotel Transylvania 2	Additional voices	
2019	Serenity	Patrick (voice)	
2019	Lucky	Happy McSweeney	Television film
2020	Latte and the Magic Waterstone	Amaroo, Boar Kid (voice)	English dub

=== Television ===
Year	Series	Role	Note	Ref.
2014	Nashville	Micah Brenner		
2014–2015	Clarence	Cooter		
2015	Kickin' It	Walt	Episode: "Bringing Down the House"	
2016–2019	Ben 10	Billy Billions (voice)		
2018–2025	Craig of the Creek	Jason, Aaron (voice)		
2018–2019	Kung Fu Panda: The Paws of Destiny	Bao (voice)		
2018	The Loud House	Trent (voice)	1 episode	
2018	The Adventures of Kid Danger	Little Dingus (voice)		
2019	The Casagrandes	Kingston (voice)	Episode: "New Haunts"	
2020	Cleopatra in Space	Philo (voice)		
2024	Everybody Still Hates Chris	Greg Wuliger (voice)		
2024–2025	Star Wars: Young Jedi Adventures	Wes Vinik (voice)		
