= Telisha Shaw =

American actress

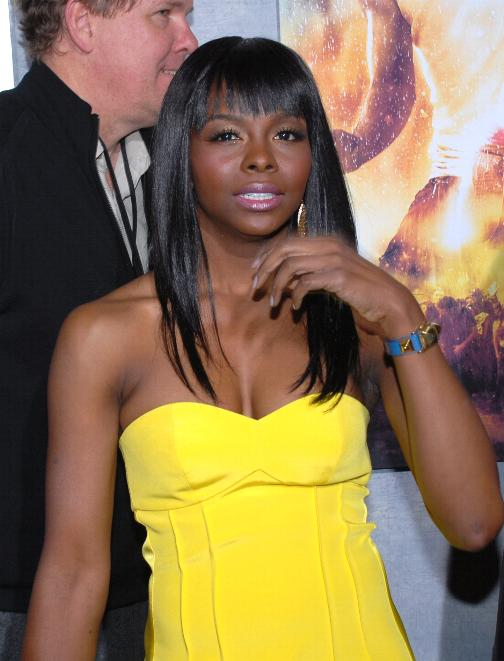
- Shaw (foreground) at the premiere of Step Up 2 The Streets
- Born: October 4, 1978 (age 47); Memphis, Tennessee, US
- Occupations: Actress; dancer; singer
- Years active: 2003–2010

Telisha Shaw (born October 4, 1978) is an American retired actress, dancer, and singer. She is best known for dancing with such artists as Janet Jackson, Christina Aguilera, and Green Day, as well as her roles on Weeds and It's Always Sunny in Philadelphia and starring in Dirty opposite Cuba Gooding Jr. She starred as Felicia in Buena Vista Pictures' Step Up 2: The Streets, out February 2008.

== Early life ==
Shaw was born in Memphis, Tennessee. She began studying ballet at the age of three and later, at age 11, received a scholarship to the Dance Theatre of Harlem under the direction of Arthur Mitchell.

She attended the University of Tennessee at Knoxville as a dance major. After finishing at the University of Tennessee, she moved to Los Angeles, California, to become a professional dancer and to concentrate on her acting career.

== Career ==
Shaw made her film debut in the crime thriller Dirty as the young, drug-addicted girlfriend of Cuba Gooding Jr. She then landed guest appearances on Weeds, It's Always Sunny in Philadelphia, Campus Ladies, and Studio 60 on the Sunset Strip. Shaw next appeared in Step Up 2: The Streets released in February 2008.

== Filmography ==
| Year | Title | Role | Note(s) |
|---|---|---|---|
| 2005 | Dirty | Judith | |
| 2005 | It's Always Sunny in Philadelphia | Janell | Episode: "The Gang Gets Racist" |
| 2005 | Punk'd | Self | |
| 2006 | Weeds | Teenya | |
| 2006 | Studio 60 on the Sunset Strip | Telisha | |
| 2007 | Campus Ladies | Condoleezza | |
| 2008 | Step Up 2: The Streets | Felicia | |
| 2009 | Glee | Aphasia | |
| 2010 | How to Make Love to a Woman | Rose | |
