= Carla Renata =

American actress and singer

- Born: Cherry Point, North Carolina, United States
- Occupations: Actress, singer
- Years active: 1992–present
- Notable work: Gary Coleman in Avenue Q
- Awards: NAACP Theatre Awards Nomination
- Website: www.carlarenata.com

Carla Renata (sometimes credited as Carla Renata Williams) is an American actress, film critic, and singer. She was born in Cherry Point, North Carolina and grew up in St. Louis, Missouri. Renata has starred in several long-running Broadway musicals, national tours, and appears on television shows. She is creator and host of The Curvy Critic with Carla Renata which streams via YouTube and Facebook Live.

== Biography ==
Carla Renata graduated from Howard University with a B.A. in Broadcast Production and was cast in the Matthew Broderick Broadway revival of How to Succeed in Business Without Really Trying. She has worked in Broadway musicals. The Life, Smokey Joe's Cafe and in Vegas for the rock group Queen as "Killer Queen" in their hit musical We Will Rock You. She made history becoming the 1st African American actress to secure recurring roles on four television shows - TWICE: Shake It Up, Hart of Dixie, How to Live With Your Parents, Mr. Box Office and Superstore.

She is best known for her roles in Avenue Q, Smokey Joe's Cafe on Broadway.

The New York Times called her an "Energizer Bunny of a comedian with a big ponytail, giant hoop earrings and an impressive résumé" and cites her vocalism and style as ranging from "quasi-operatic" to gospel and rock. The NAACP Theatre Awards nominated her performance for being outstanding in the Los Angeles production of The Lion King as Shenzi.

== Broadway credits ==
- The Lion King Original Los Angeles Production
- How to Succeed in Business Without Really Trying
- Avenue Q – Gary Coleman
- The Life
- Smokey Joe's Café

== Off-Broadway ==
- Back to Bacharach and David – soloist

== Film ==
- Latte & the Magic Waterstone - Boar's Mother

== TV credits ==
- According to Jim - Sherri (2 episodes)
- Anger Management – Angelina (1 episode)
- Bones – Maureen Mack (1 episode)
- CSI: Crime Scene Investigation – Devine (1 episode)
- Frasier – Louise (1 episode)
- Hart of Dixie – Susie / Zombie No. 6 (19 episodes)
- How to Live With Your Parents – Mrs. Fogelman (2 episodes)
- Invincible Fight Girl – Goldy (voice) (4 episodes)
- It's Always Sunny in Philadelphia – Police Clerk (1 episode)
- Lastman – Additional Voices (3 episodes)
- Life in Pieces – Physician's Assistant (1 episode)
- Living Biblically – Gracie (6 episodes)
- Modern Family – Nikki (1 episode)
- Mr. Box Office – Lois Yearwood (2 episodes)
- New Girl – Octopussy (1 episode)
- Reba - IRS Agent Miller (1 episode)
- Shake It Up – Marcie Blue (6 episodes)
- Superstore – Janet (28 episodes)
- The Haves and the Have Nots – Joanne (2 episodes)
- The Neighbors – Leslie (1 episode)
- The Suite Life of Zack and Cody – Veronica (1 episode)
- Wabbit – Tooth Fairy, Grandma (voices) (2 episodes)
- Young & Hungry – Ms. Higgs (1 episode)
- Zoey 101 – Nurse Crocker (2 episodes)

== National touring credits ==
- Avenue Q – Gary Coleman
- The Who's Tommy – u/s The Acid Queen

== Regional theatre credits ==
- The Lion King – Los Angeles production as Shenzi

== Video game credits ==
- Grand Theft Auto: Episodes from Liberty City – Lisa Lynn
- Grand Theft Auto V – The Local Population
- Kinect Disneyland Adventures – N/A
- Maneater – Female Hunter 4

== Film credits ==
- Latte and the Magic Waterstone – Boar's Mother (voice)
