= Freeze Out (film) =

- Directed by: M. J. Loheed
- Written by: M. J. Loheed
- Starring: Tom Sharpe; Laura Silverman; Greg Behrendt; Kristopher Logan; Eddie Pepitone
- Release date: October 2, 2005
- Running time: 95 minutes
- Country: United States
- Language: English

Freeze Out is the 2005 debut feature film of M.J. Loheed an American writer and director. It was financed primarily with Loheed’s own poker winnings and is believed to be the first independent film financed with poker money.

It premiered in 2005 at the Westwood International Film Festival where it won the Best Feature Award. Freeze Out was also an official selection of the 2006 Cinequest Viewer's Voice Festival and the 2006 Omaha film Festival.

== Synopsis ==
Freeze out is a comedy film about a man who seeks revenge for the repeaetd bullying he experiences from his friends during the weekily poker game

Johns weekly poker game provides him a much needed escape from societal pressures and expectations from living in Los Angeles.The gathering mainly howerver revolves around films,politics past relations and is traditionally played with around 25 cents

However John,whose tired of being made fun off,raises the stakes,trains in secret and engineers a winner take all "FREEZE OUT",the plan however threathening his friendship

What begins as a simple poker game quickly morphs into something much deeper.
