= Eddie Pepitone =

American actor and comedian

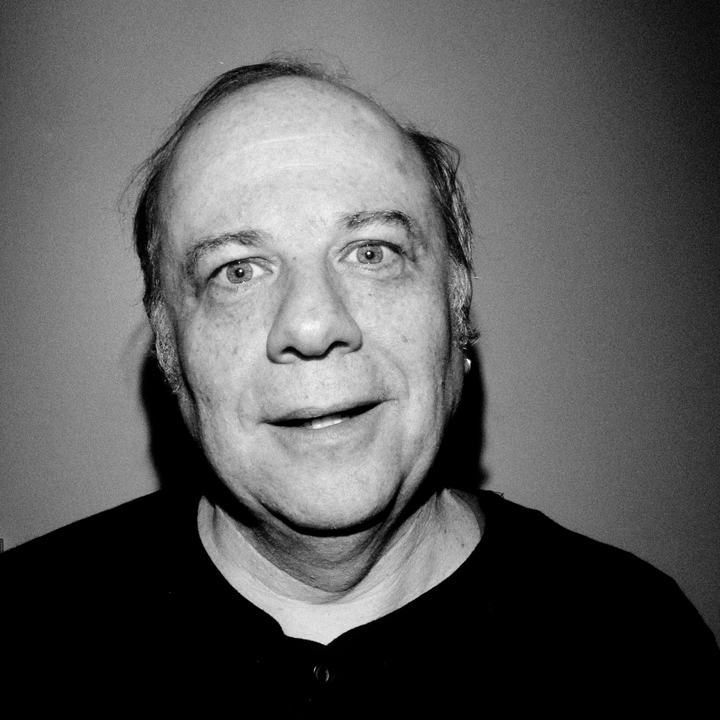
- Pepitone in 2012
- Born: Edward David Pepitone; November 5, 1958 (age 68); New York City

Comedy career
- Years active: 1978–present
- Medium: Stand-up, podcast, television, film
- Genres: Alternative comedy, dark comedy, observational comedy, political satire

Edward David Pepitone (born November 5, 1958) is an American character actor, stand-up comedian, and podcast host. He is known for his dark comedy style.

== Early life ==
Pepitone was born to a Sicilian father and a Jewish mother in Brooklyn, New York City, and was raised from the age of nine on Staten Island. His father was a history teacher and later the dean of a high school. As a child, he would often make his friends laugh, describing himself as a "classic class clown" and would incorporate the use of word play and non sequiturs. He cited Jackie Gleason as a major influence. While his mother was supportive of his career choice, his father wanted him to become a doctor. His father, involved with the Teachers Union, gave him a copy of The Rich and the Super Rich by Ferdinand Lundberg. Pepitone attended Brooklyn Technical High School. Prior to becoming a comedian, he installed and sanded hardwood flooring, which he claims caused tinnitus that affects him today. He also developed a hernia while working on hardwood floors.

== Career ==
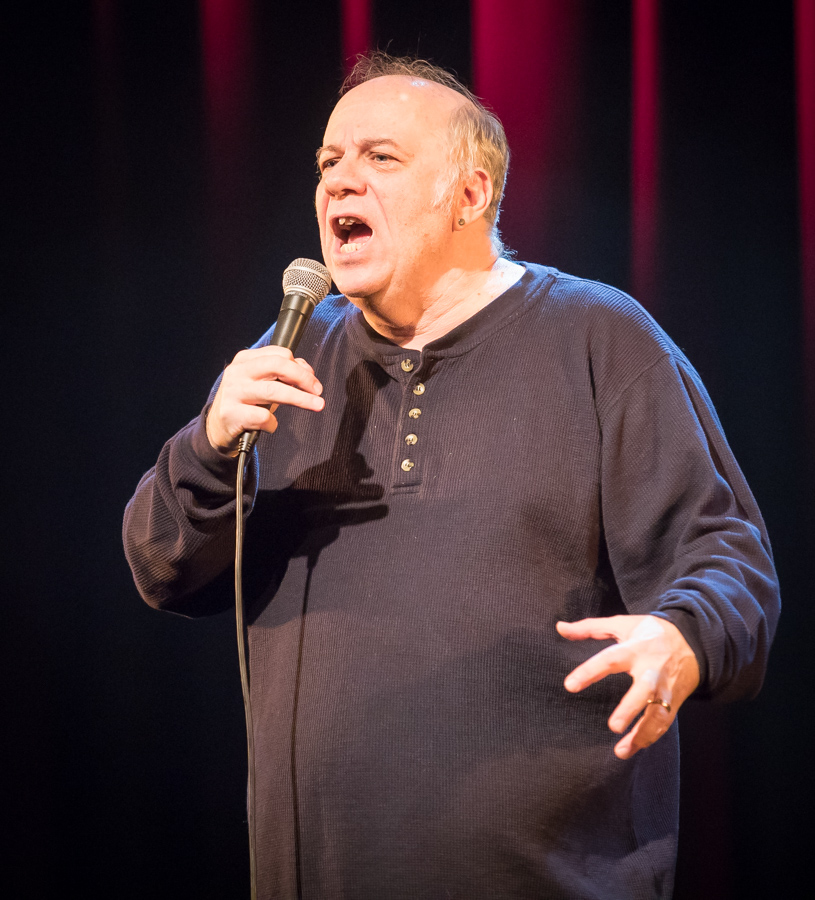
Pepitone in 2017, at the Crap Comedy Festival in Oslo, Norway

Pepitone started doing stand-up comedy in 1978. He took a hiatus from performing stand up comedy and started doing improv comedy, performing with improv troupe Chicago City Limits. Described as a "cult favorite", Pepitone is a staple in the Los Angeles comedy scene. He is known for his regular appearances in the early days of the WTF with Marc Maron podcast and his sketch appearances on Late Night with Conan O'Brien and Conan, often playing his recurring role as the "New York City Heckler" in the audience. He has had recurring roles on television programs such as The Life & Times of Tim, The Sarah Silverman Program and Nick Swardson's Pretend Time. His short mockumentary film Runyon: Just Above Sunset, co-written by Karen Simmons and directed by Troy Conrad, won Best in Show (as well as Best Actor in a Mockumentary) at the L.A. Mockfest as well as Best Comedy Short at the Burbank Film Festival in 2011. Pepitone often pokes fun at corporatocracy and has been nicknamed the Bitter Buddha.

Pepitone was a first-round contestant during the first season of Last Comic Standing. Throughout the late 1990s and early 2000s, Pepitone was a regular sketch performer on Late Night with Conan O'Brien. He has appeared in films such as The Muppets, Old School, School for Scoundrels, and Terri. Pepitone regularly performs stand-up comedy at the Upright Citizens Brigade Theater in Los Angeles. Pepitone has made many guest appearances on comedy programs, including Bob's Burgers, The King of Queens, Chappelle's Show, Malcolm in the Middle, House, Monk, Community, Childrens Hospital, The Eric Andre Show, Happy Endings, Flight of the Conchords, 2 Broke Girls, Whitney, and It's Always Sunny in Philadelphia. Pepitone also appears in the 2012 documentary Alone Up There, which looks at the craft of stand-up comedy.

Pepitone released a sketch comedy album in 2006 called The Big Push. His first stand-up album, A Great Stillness, was recorded at the Gotham Comedy Club and released in 2011.

From 2011 to 2013, Pepitone starred in the 500 episodes of the web comedy series Puddin'. A documentary about Pepitone's career entitled The Bitter Buddha was released in 2012 to positive reviews.

In the fall of 2013, Pepitone started hosting his own podcast called Pep Talks after being a member of The Long Shot podcast for several years. In 2014, he won the September 7 episode of @midnight.

Pepitone appears in the Adult Swim comedy Your Pretty Face Is Going to Hell as Eddie, a tortured soul.

His stand-up special For the Masses was released in June 2020. In December 2020, The New York Times called it the funniest special of the year.

== Personal life ==
Pepitone is a vegan, having become vegan after watching animal rights videos. His wife is an animal rights activist.

Pepitone is best friends with Matt Oswalt, the younger brother of Patton Oswalt.

== Comedy specials ==
- The Bitter Buddha (2013) – A documentary exploring his life and career, available via DVD, download, and streaming.
- In Ruins (2014) – Originally premiering on Netflix, now available for download and streaming across various digital platforms.
- For the Masses (2020) – Available for streaming and download.
- The Collapse (2025) – Available exclusively for streaming on Veeps.

== Discography ==
=== Albums ===
Year	Title	Label	Formats
2006	The Big Push	Exotic Recordings	CD/Download
2011	A Great Stillness	Self-release	Download
2014	A Great Stillness	Stand Up! Records	CD/LP / color vinyl LP (2017)
2015	In Ruins: Live In Brooklyn	Comedy Dynamics	CD/Download

=== Video Specials ===
Year	Title	Studio	Formats
2014	In Ruins (special)	Netflix	Download/Streaming (Netflix and free on YouTube)
2020	For the Masses (special)	800 Pound Gorilla	Download/Streaming
2025	The Collapse (special)	Veeps	Streaming (Free on YouTube)

=== Album appearances ===
Year	Artists	Title	Track
2006	The Comedians of Comedy	Live at the El Rey	Cameo
2007	The Comedians of Comedy	Comedians To Pay Attention To	4. "Eddie Pepitone"
2012	Various Artists from Stand Up! Records	Comedy Juice All-Stars	3. "Twitbook"
2012	Rob Kutner And The Levinson Brothers	It's Okay To Do Stuff	6. "Wally Wants A Real Doll"
2015	Adam Carolla	Road Work, Vol. 1 What Can't Adam Complain About?	7. "Finding Money (The Irvine Improv 12/10/12)"
2017	Crazy Ex-Girlfriend feat. Rachel Bloom	Getting Over Jeff (single)	2. "My Friend's Dad"

== Filmography ==
=== Film ===
Year	Title	Role	Notes
1986	Combat Shock	Terry – Strung-Out Junkie	
2003	Old School	Archer	
2005	Save the Mavericks	Coach Cal	
2005	Freeze Out	Tim	
2007	The Heckler	Heckler / Stand-Up	Short film; also writer
2007	Life with Fiona	Mr. Thogmartin	
2007	The Living Wake	Reginald	
2009	Punching the Clown	Eddie	
2010	Pickin' & Grinnin'	Al	
2010	The Search for Santa Paws	Carlos	Uncredited
2010	Bright Day!	Himself	Documentary film
2010	Seattle Komedy Dokumentary	Himself	Documentary film
2011	Runyon: Just Above Sunset	Eddie	Short film
2011	Who the F#ck Is Chip Seinfeld?	Himself	
2011	Terri	Joe Hollywood	
2011	The Legend of Awesomest Maximus	Approximo	
2011	The Muppets	Postman	
2012	Alone Up There	Himself	Documentary film
2012	The Bitter Buddha	Himself	Documentary film
2013	Free Ride	BK	
2014	Trunk'd	Randy	
2014	Angry Video Game Nerd: The Movie	John Swann	
2015	Bad Night	The Clown	
2015	Regular Show: The Movie	Sherm (voice)	
2016	B-Roll	Sam	
2016	5 Doctors	Boris	
2017	Handsome	Durante	

=== Television ===
Year	Title	Role	Notes
2000	Now and Again	Delivery Guy	
2001	Deadline	Man	
2002	Law & Order: Criminal Intent	Court Deputy / Counterman	
2002–2007	Late Night with Conan O'Brien	Various	
2003	Chappelle's Show	Sheila's Neighbor	
2004	The King of Queens	Dennis / Rob	2 episodes
2004	Crossballs: The Debate Show	PSA Father / Eddie Taylor	
2004	Cheap Seats	Al Fawcett	
2005	Weekends at the D.L.	Dr. Miller / Sal	
2006	Malcolm in the Middle	Homeless Nick	1 episode
2006	It's Always Sunny in Philadelphia	Tony	Episode: "Dennis and Dee Go on Welfare"
2007	Flight of the Conchords	Eddie	1 episode
2007	ER	Dying Patient – Bernie Zucker	
2007–2010	The Sarah Silverman Program	Himself	
2008	Wizards of Waverly Place	Carny	
2008	Atom TV	(voice)	
2008	Held Up	Martin	Television film
2008–2012	The Life & Times of Tim	Various characters (voice)	8 episodes
2009	Important Things with Demetri Martin	Johnson	
2009	Monk	Animal Control Officer	
2009	Secret Girlfriend	Eddie	
2009–2020	Reno 911!	Murray / Bernie Sanders Decoy	
2010	Funny or Die Presents	Hobo / Guy on Couch	
2010	Weeds	Phil Lounsberry	
2010	Childrens Hospital	Shady Mobster	
2010–2011	Pretend Time	Various	
2011	Svetlana	Client	
2011	Happy Endings	Crazy Randy	
2011–2015	Aqua Teen Hunger Force	Dolores Brutananadilewski (voice)	3 episodes
2011–2012	2 Broke Girls	Hoarder Guy / Barney	
2011–2013	Conan	Various	
2011–2014	Community	Crazy Schmidt	4 episodes
2012	Whitney	Older Man	
2012	House	Operator	
2012	The Eric Andre Show	Reporter	
2012–2014	Kickin' It	Lou	3 episodes
2012–2016	Comedy Bang! Bang!	Various	
2012–2019	Bob's Burgers	Reggie (voice)	
2013	Arrested Development	Govennah	
2013	Hello Ladies	Paparazzo	
2013–2019	Your Pretty Face Is Going to Hell	Eddie	18 episodes
2014	Brooklyn Nine-Nine	Leo Sporm	Episode: "The Ebony Falcon"
2014	The Neighbors	Medieval Executioner	
2014	Mulaney	Arnie	
2014–2015	Maron	Stu Carbone	2 episodes
2015	Man Seeking Woman		
2015	The Jim Gaffigan Show	Eddie Pepitone	
2015–2016	Regular Show	Sherm (voice)	4 episodes
2016	Limitless	Josh-O-Saurus	
2016	Those Who Can't	Judge Strom Clancy	
2016–2017	Love	Eddie	
2017	The Goldbergs	Tony the Deli Guy	Episode: "So Swayze It's Crazy"
2017	Crazy Ex-Girlfriend	Bob O'Brien	
2017–2018	Mighty Magiswords	DeBizz (voice)	
2018	Corporate	Mitch the Butcher	
2018	Stan Against Evil	Leonard Walinsky	
2019	Speechless	Angry Traveler	
2019	Bless This Mess	Larry	
2019	Momma Named Me Sheriff	Mr. Nabbers (voice)	
2019	Rick and Morty	Testicle Monster #2 (voice)	Episode: "Rattlestar Ricklactica"
2020	Will & Grace	Walt	
2020	Schooled	Fishtown Frankie	
2020	The Midnight Gospel	Bob (Talking) (voice)	
2020	Sarah Cooper: Everything's Fine	Control Room Guy / Bus Passenger	Television special
2021	M.O.D.O.K.	Bruno Horgan / Melter (voice)	
2021	Saved by the Bell	Phil Dapatone	
2021–2023	Ten Year Old Tom	Various voices	
2022	Winning Time: The Rise of the Lakers Dynasty	Mr. Melvin	
2022	Ramy	Frankie	
2022	Central Park	(voice)	
2024–2026	Rock Paper Scissors	Lou Zer (voice)	Supporting character
2024	Unstable	Maurice	
2024	Kite Man: Hell Yeah!	Sixpack (voice)	
2024	Universal Basic Guys	Rick Rosen (voice)	
2026	Regular Show: The Lost Tapes	Sherm (voice)	Episode: "Stilt Walkers"
