= Free Sky Ferreira Movement =

Social media fan campaign

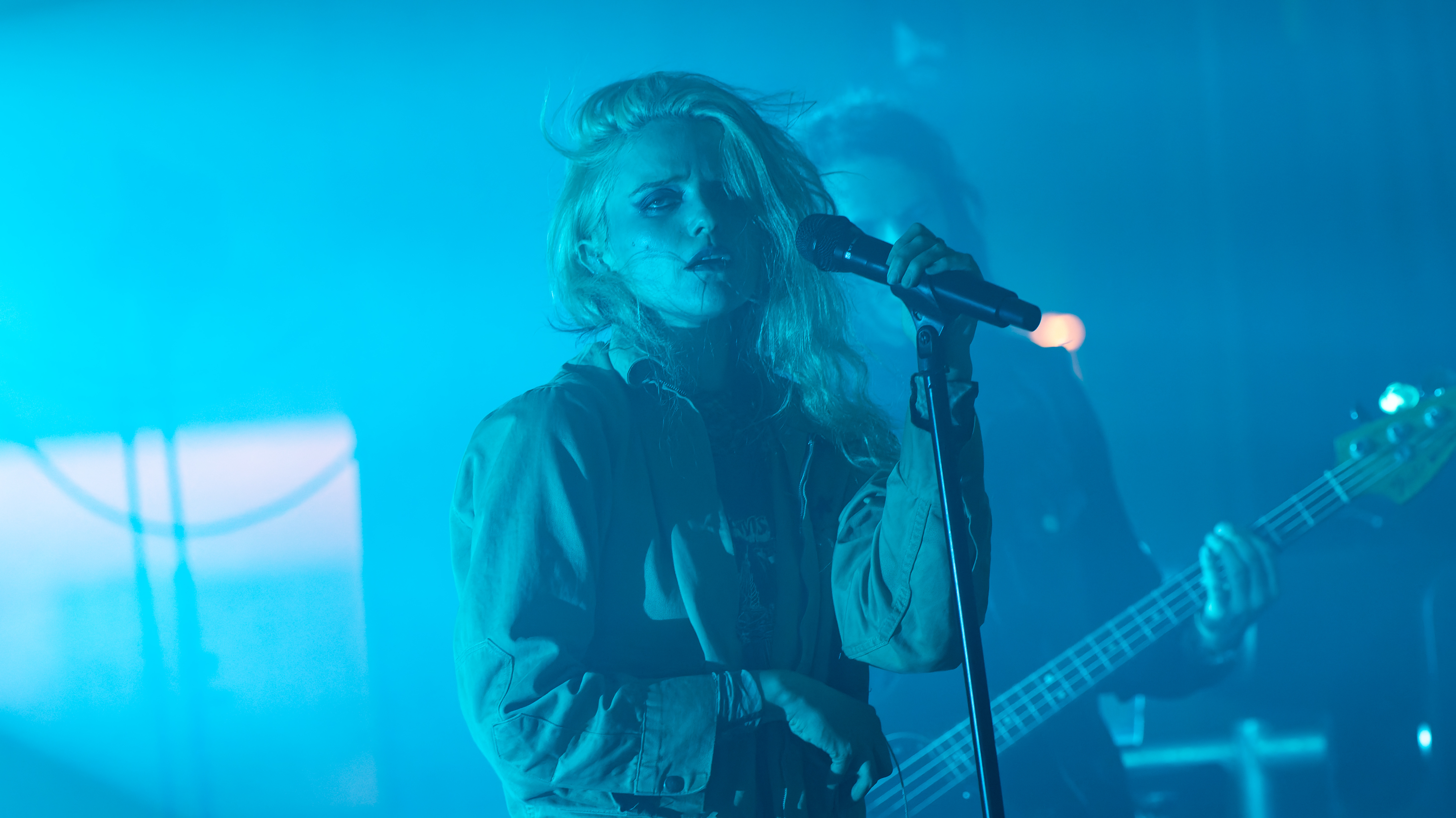
- Ferreira performing in 2022
- Date: March 2021 – November 7, 2023
- Location: Social media In-person demonstrations: New York, NY, Los Angeles, CA
- Goals: Release of the album Masochism
- Methods: Social media posts, billboards, aerial advertising
- Result: Ferreira dropped from Capitol Records in 2024; Masochism yet to be released

Parties
Fans of Sky Ferreira (Note: Supported by Sky Ferreira.)	Capitol Records

The Free Sky Ferreira Movement (often stylized online as #FreeSkyFerreira) was a social media campaign organized by fans of American singer Sky Ferreira, designed to mitigate purported disputes between Ferreira and the record label that she was signed to at the time, Capitol Records. Ferreira released her first studio album Night Time, My Time in 2013, following two EPs, As If! and Ghost, all of which were released by Capitol.

Ferreira has had public issues with Capitol Records dating back to 2018, when she claimed she was forced to give up control of her SoundCloud account. These disputes continued into 2022, with her claiming that Capitol Records had not supported her enough, often accusing the label of sabotage in the lead-up to the release of her second studio album Masochism. Taking notice of her claims and the lack of Masochism's release, fans started an online campaign in March of 2021 in support of Ferreira, identifying itself with the hashtag #FreeSkyFerreira.

== History ==
The title of Ferreira's second studio album was announced on April 6, 2015. While she had not confirmed a release date then, Ferreira on multiple different occasions had later said that Masochism would be released in the summer of 2016. After the album had failed to come out, Ferreira later implied a release date in 2018, albeit vaguely. In 2019, Ferreira released her first single since the release of Night Time, My Time, "Downhill Lullaby", which was intended to appear on Masochism. In December of 2021, Ferreira stated that Masochism was to be released in 2022. In March of that year, a second single, "Don't Forget", was released by Capitol Records, but no release date was announced. In regards to the issues with the release of Masochism, fans of Ferreira launched the campaign in March of 2021, primarily centered around an Instagram account titled Free Sky Ferreira, as well as a Change.org petition that advocated for the release of Masochism.

=== Free Fiona Movement and Inspiration ===
In 2005, Fiona Apple faced a similar issue with her label, Epic Records, which supposedly barred Apple from releasing her third album, Extraordinary Machine; this prompted Apple's fans to launch a campaign called Free Fiona. The Free Fiona campaign was credited with helping aid the eventual release of Extraordinary Machine. The successes of the Free Fiona campaign have been cited as an inspiration for the creation of the Free Sky Ferreira movement.

== Actions ==
=== Times Square billboard ===
On August 14, 2023, a billboard appeared in Times Square, New York, with the message "Free Sky Ferreira" superimposed onto an image of Ferreira. The message appeared at around 5:30 PM and was displayed on the 18,000-square-foot billboard for approximately 15 seconds. Those behind the Free Sky Ferreira Instagram account claimed responsibility for the action one day later, posting videos of the billboard to the account on August 15. Ferreira herself reposted a video from The Fader to her Instagram story. The video covered the billboard as well as the Free Sky Ferreira account's claims that Capitol Records was holding her "hostage"; Ferreira corroborated the account's claim, adding the caption "It's true" to her story.

The billboard was reported to have cost $40 for the 15-second time slot.

=== Free Sky Ferreira Banner ===
One month later, on September 22, an airplane carrying a banner that read "Free Sky Ferreira" flew past the Capitol Records Building in Hollywood. It was confirmed that the Free Sky Ferreira movement organized this when later that same day the account claimed responsibility for the banner as well.

== Results ==
On November 7, 2023, the Free Sky Ferreira account posted that Capitol Records had apparently removed Ferreira from their list of artists, causing many to assume that she had been let go from Capitol. Ferreira later confirmed that she had been dropped. Furthermore, Ferreira went on to claim that Capitol Records had informed her that she had been let go on the tenth anniversary of the release of her debut album Night Time, My Time.

In an interview with Vogue, Ferreira revealed that she was unable to release much of the music that she had recorded while she was with Capitol Records, and when asked about the possibility of re-recording much of her unreleased discography, she commented, "Taylor Swift can do that because she’s a billionaire, but I basically put all the money I’ve ever made as an artist back into making music."

In December of 2024, Ferreira released the song "Leash", marking her first release as an independent artist. The song was written for the soundtrack of the 2024 Halina Reijn film Babygirl. Reijn personally reached out to Ferreira to ask her to compose a track for the film while she was on tour, which Ferreira described as "an ideal way of writing"; both the song and the film were released by A24.

Ferreira announced that Masochism would be released in 2025. It was not released.
