= Mary Lambert (singer) =

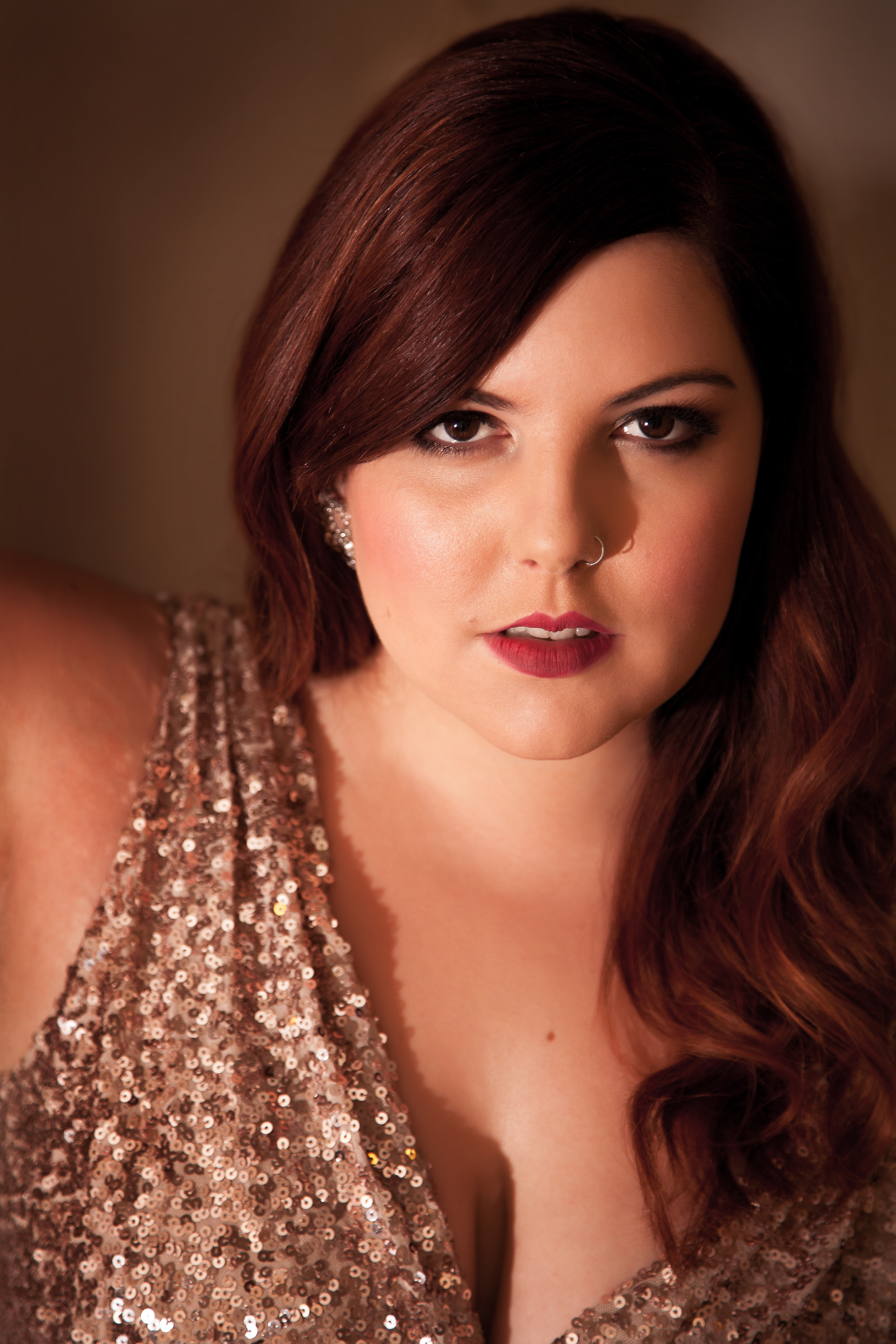
- Born: Mary Danielle Lambert; May 3, 1989 (age 37); Seattle, Washington, U.S.
- Occupations: Singer; songwriter; spoken word artist; LGBTQ activist; poet; actress
- Years active: 2011–present
- Spouse: Wyatt Paige Hermansen (m. 2022; sep. 2024)
- Musical career
- Genres: R&B; folk; pop; spoken word
- Instruments: Vocals; piano; guitar; cello
- Labels: Capitol; Tender Heart
- Website: marylambertsings.com

Mary Danielle Lambert (born May 3, 1989) is an American singer, songwriter and spoken word artist. She worked with Macklemore and Ryan Lewis on a track on their album The Heist. Lambert is the featured artist of their LGBTQ rights single, "Same Love". Her contributions to "Same Love" draw upon her experiences as "a lesbian growing up in a tumultuous, Christian upbringing." Lambert took the content she created for "Same Love" and used it to develop the song "She Keeps Me Warm" which she released on July 30, 2013. A music video was released on Vevo on August 24.

Lambert's music has been compared to the music of Adele, P!nk, Tori Amos, and James Blake. Her shows are described as "safe spaces where crying is acceptable and even encouraged." Her debut EP, Letters Don't Talk, was released on July 17, 2012, and peaked at number 18 on the iTunes Singer-Songwriter charts. On December 17, 2013, Lambert released her second EP, Welcome to the Age of My Body, under Capitol Records. Lambert's studio album Heart on My Sleeve was released on October 14, 2014, and debuted at number 29 on the Billboard 200.

Lambert performed at the 2016 Gay Christian Network Conference in Houston, Texas, an annual conference that draws over 1300 LGBT people from around the world, on January 8, 2016.

== Early and personal life ==
Originally from Everett, Washington, Lambert attended Mariner High School between 2003 and 2007. Her mother is also a recording artist.

She was raised as a Pentecostal Christian, but her family was expelled from the church when she was six years old because her mother had come out as a lesbian. Later Lambert became an evangelical Christian, attending Mars Hill Church beginning when she was in high school. She struggled for many years to reconcile her Christianity and her sexuality, even after coming out as a lesbian at the age of 17. She has concluded after some time that being gay does not conflict with Christianity and that condemnation of gay people is antithetical to the Christian message.

Lambert was sexually abused by her father and others as a child, and she has described herself as "ending up being a depressed eight-year-old". She taught herself how to play piano and write songs at age 6 as an escape from her traumatic and abusive household. Her poetry and music often discuss her early childhood traumas, sexual abuse, body image, bipolar disorder, and her sexuality. Lambert married her partner of four years, Wyatt Paige Hermansen, on October 22, 2022. On January 26, 2024, Lambert announced via social media her separation from Hermansen. She lives in Seattle.

Lambert moved to Seattle in 2007 studying at Cornish College of the Arts and graduated with a Bachelor of Music in composition.

== Career ==
=== 2008–2011: Career beginnings and spoken word poetry ===
In 2008, Lambert represented Seattle, Washington in Brave New Voices International Poetry Competition, which was filmed on HBO. She co-founded Seattle's Collegiate team in 2009 and competed at the College Unions Poetry Slam Invitational.

=== 2012–2013: Breakthrough with "Same Love" and 500 Tips for Fat Girls ===
In 2012, Lambert co-wrote and provided vocals for Macklemore and Ryan Lewis's single "Same Love". Subsequently, in 2013, "Same Love" was awarded double Platinum certification in the US by RIAA. The track earned continued success when it became a top ten single in six countries. A music video was released on October 2, 2012, and as of August 2018, it had over 200 million views on YouTube.

In January 2013, Lambert independently released a book of poetry titled 500 Tips for Fat Girls. The book has received positive reviews, with one critic stating that it was "moving and strikingly original exploration". In the summer of 2013, Lambert released her solo debut single, "She Keeps Me Warm", which samples the chorus that she wrote for "Same Love". A music video was released on August 24 of that same year on Lambert's Vevo. As of December 2013, the "She Keeps Me Warm" music video had reached over two million views.

On December 17, 2013, Lambert released her debut major label extended play Welcome to the Age of My Body under Capitol Records. The EP features a new version of "She Keeps Me Warm" entitled "Body Love", which was broken into two parts. The track was also featured on her last EP, Letters Don't Talk, along with a new song entitled "Sarasvati".

On December 18, 2013, Lambert announced on her website that her debut album had been scheduled for release in early 2014.

=== 2014–2019: Heart On My Sleeve and Grief Creature ===
For the 56th Annual Grammy Awards, Lambert was nominated for two awards, one for Song of the Year for "Same Love" and the other for Album of the Year for The Heist as a featured artist. On January 26, 2014, she performed "Same Love" alongside Macklemore and Ryan Lewis at the 56th Annual Grammy Awards. During their performance Queen Latifah read marriage vows from 33 couples on stage. Then Madonna came on stage and began singing with Lambert. After the performances, Lambert's debut single "She Keeps Me Warm" started gaining more airplay and selling more copies. Radio play of "She Keeps Me Warm" increased by 24% in 2014.

On February 9, 2014, Lambert announced on her official website that she was filming a video for "Body Love". On March 17, 2014, she announced on her website that she would be touring with Gavin DeGraw and Matt Nathanson. Eric Rosse is producing Lambert's debut album.

A music video for Lambert's "Body Love" Part 1 and 2 was released on April 22, 2014. As of May 8, the video has received over 220 thousand views on VEVO.

In 2014, Lambert was included as part of The Advocate's annual "40 under 40" list. In December 2014, she took part in a United Nations panel promoting diversity in families.

In October 2014, Lambert's debut album Heart on My Sleeve was released and included the hit "Secrets" which peaked at number one on the U.S. Dance chart.

She is working on her new album. In July 2016, she released a single titled "Hang Out With You" and a music video for the song. She is a featured artist on the single "Hands", a tribute to the victims of the Orlando nightclub shooting.

In 2016, she performed as a guest vocalist on Superfruit's cover of Katy Perry's "Rise".

In 2018, she published her second collection of poetry, Shame Is an Ocean I Swim Across.

In December 2019, she and her partner started a podcast, The Manic Episodes.

=== 2021–present: Arlo the Alligator Boy and I Heart Arlo ===
In April 2021, Lambert made her acting debut in the animated musical film Arlo the Alligator Boy as a giantess named Bertie. She reprises the role in its follow-up series I ♥ Arlo.

== Artistry ==
=== Musical style ===
Elisabeth Siegel of Harker Aquila describes Lambert's voice as "heartwrenching soprano vocals". She wrote every song on her first two EPs, Letters Don't Talk and Welcome To the Age of My Body. Her songwriting style has often been compared to Adele, Tori Amos, Bon Iver, and James Blake. Lambert stated in a Huffington Post interview that her music and poetry contain "A lot of darkness, and sadness and grief", primarily about her early childhood traumas, sexual abuse, body image, bipolar disorder, and her sexuality. The "Same Love" chorus refers to Lambert's experiences as a lesbian growing up in a tumultuous, Christian upbringing. The line, "Not crying on Sundays," which repeats, echoes the way she felt after leaving Sunday services in the evangelical church. She wrote the chorus's hook in two hours. "Body Love" and "Sarasvati" both feature her using a talk-rhythm singing style.

Lambert was asked why she wrote the chorus for "Same Love". She said that she wanted to write a song that was "genuine and authentic to my experience."

== Discography ==
=== Studio albums ===
Title	Album details	Peak chart positions	
Title	Album details	US	AUS
Heart on My Sleeve	Released: October 14, 2014; Label: Capitol Records; Format: CD, digital download	29	61
Grief Creature	Released: November 15, 2019; Label: Capitol Records; Format: CD, digital download, Vinyl	—	—
"—" denotes a recording that did not chart or was not released in that territory.

=== Extended plays ===
Title	Album details	Peak chart positions	
Title	Album details	US Heat	US Folk
Letters Don't Talk	Released: July 17, 2012; Label: Self-released; Formats: Digital download	34	—
Welcome to the Age of My Body	Released: December 17, 2013; Label: Capitol Records; Formats: CD, digital download	20	23
Bold	Released: May 5, 2017; Label: Tender Heart, ML Sings; Formats: Digital download	–	–
"—" denotes a recording that did not chart or was not released in that territory.

=== Singles ===
==== As lead artist ====
Year	Title	Peak chart positions					Album
Year	Title	US	US Adult	US Dance	AUS	NZ	Album
2013	"She Keeps Me Warm"	—	20	—	—	—	Welcome to the Age of My Body
2014	"Secrets"	66	12	1	39	40	Heart on My Sleeve
2016	"Hang out with You"	—	—	—	—	—	Bold
2019	"Born Sad"	—	—	—	—	—	Grief Creature
2020	"Dear Jo"	—	—	—	—	—	
"—" denotes a recording that did not chart or was not released in that territory.

==== As featured artist ====
Title	Year	Peak chart positions										Certifications	Album
Title	Year	US	AUS	AUT	CAN	FRA	IRE	NL	NZ	SWI	UK	Certifications	Album
"Same Love" (Macklemore & Ryan Lewis featuring Mary Lambert)	2012	11	1	19	4	19	6	18	1	33	6	RIAA: 3× Platinum; ARIA: 5× Platinum; BPI: Silver; MC: Platinum; RMNZ: 3× Platinum	The Heist
"Hands" (with various artists)	2016	—	—	—	—	—	—	—	—	—	—		—N/a
"—" denotes a recording that did not chart or was not released in that territory.

=== Other appearances ===
Title	Year	Other artist(s)	Album
"Follow Me Home"	2021	Michael J. Woodard	Arlo the Alligator Boy: Music from the Netflix Film
"Beautiful Together"	2021	Michael J. Woodard	Arlo the Alligator Boy: Music from the Netflix Film
"The Way"	2021	Michael J. Woodard	I Heart Arlo: Music from the Netflix Series
"Even in a Garden"	2021	—N/a	I Heart Arlo: Music from the Netflix Series
"I Can Lift You Up"	2021	Michael J. Woodard	I Heart Arlo: Music from the Netflix Series
"Just Another Night in New York"	2021	—N/a	I Heart Arlo: Music from the Netflix Series
"Coming Together"	2021	Michael J. Woodard; Jonathan Van Ness; Haley Tju; Brett Gelman; Tony Hale	I Heart Arlo: Music from the Netflix Series
"As Long As We Got Each Other"	2021	Michael J. Woodard "I Heart Arlo" Cast	I Heart Arlo: Music from the Netflix Series

== Tours ==
- Heart on My Sleeve Tour (2014)
- Everybody is a Babe Tour with Mal Blum (2017)
