= Know Your Name =

Know Your Name may refer to:

- "Know Your Name", a 2006 song by the Cat Empire from Cities
- "Know Your Name", a 2010 song by Ne-Yo from Libra Scale
- "Know Your Name", a 2017 song by Mary Lambert from Bold
