= Ferras (EP) =

EP by Ferras
- Released: June 17, 2014
- Genre: Pop rock
- Length: 20:14
- Label: Capitol; Unsub Records
- Producer: Katy Perry (exec.); Greg Wells; The Monsters and the Strangerz; Jon Asher; Adam Francis

Ferras chronology
Interim – The Time Between (2010)	Ferras (2014)

Ferras is the second extended play by American singer Ferras. It was released on June 17, 2014 in the United States and Canada through Capitol Records and Metamorphosis Music. The album follows the release of his debut album Aliens & Rainbows (2008) which reached 97 on the Billboard 200. The extended play is the first to be released by Metamorphosis Music, a record label founded by Katy Perry in 2014 and later renamed to Unsub Records.

== Track listing ==
No.	Title	Writer(s)	Producer(s)	Length
1.	"Speak in Tongues"	Ferras; Sarah Hudson; Scott Hoffman; Mathieu Jomphe Lépine	Billboard	4:09
2.	"No Good in Goodnight"	Ferras; Benedetto Rotundi; Kevin Fisher	Rotundi, Benny Cassette	3:44
3.	"Champagne"	Ferras; Hudson; Jon Asher; Adam Francis	Jon Asher; The Monsters and the Strangerz	4:05
4.	"King of Sabotage"	Ferras; Hudson; Sami Diament; Kevin Kadish; Nico Hartikainen	Ultraviolet Sound; Smile Future; Kadish	4:49
5.	"Legends Never Die" (featuring Katy Perry)	Ferras; Hudson; Greg Wells	Wells	4:27
Total length:				20:14
