= Don't Forget (disambiguation) =

Don't Forget is a 2008 album by Demi Lovato.

Don't Forget may also refer to:

== Songs ==
- "Don't Forget" (Demi Lovato song), 2008
- "Don't Forget" (Sky Ferreira song), 2022
- "Remember Me" (T.I. song), originally titled "Don't Forget", 2009
- "Don't Forget", by Blxst, 2021
- "Don't Forget", by Jeff Tweedy from Warm, 2018
- "Don't Forget", by Lil Yachty from Lil Boat 3, 2020
- "Don't Forget", by Madeline Kenney from Night Night at the First Landing, 2017
- "Don't Forget", by Martha Wainwright from Martha Wainwright, 2005
- "Don't Forget", by Nat King Cole from Those Lazy-Hazy-Crazy Days of Summer, 1963
- "Don't Forget", by Rod Wave from SoulFly, 2021
- "Don't Forget", by Toby Fox and Laura Shigihara from Deltarune Chapter 1 OST, 2018
