= Promising Young Woman (soundtrack) =

Promising Young Woman (Original Motion Picture Soundtrack)

Soundtrack album by various artists
- Released: December 4, 2020
- Genres: Pop; pop rock
- Length: 54:58
- Label: Capitol
- Producers: Adrianne Gonzalez; Alex Hope; Anthony Willis; BLESSUS; Cari Fletcher; Cass Lowe; Cynthia Nabozny; Daniel Tashian; Doctor Rosen Rosen; Emerald Fennell; Fernando Garibay; Ian Fitchuk; Jennifer Decilveo; Jeremy Dussolliet; Jerker Olov Hansson; Jorge Elbrecht; Maya B; Muna; Richard Landis; Ryan Daly; Sky Ferreira
- Compilers: Anthony Willis; Emerald Fennell

Singles from Promising Young Woman (Original Motion Picture Soundtrack)
- 1. "Drinks" Released: March 6, 2020; 2. "Nothing's Gonna Hurt You Baby" Released: October 20, 2020; 3. "Uh-Oh" Released: November 13, 2020; 4. "Come and Play with Me" Released: November 23, 2020; 5. "Last Laugh" Released: December 1, 2020; 6. "It's Raining Men" Released: December 3, 2020

Promising Young Woman (Original Motion Picture Soundtrack) is the soundtrack album to the 2020 film Promising Young Woman, directed by Emerald Fennell, which was released on December 4, 2020, by Capitol Records. The album features a compilation of varied genres—pop, jazz, soul, and funk—performed by Charli XCX, Cyn, Fletcher, Paris Hilton, Donna Missal, and Maya B, among several others. The album consists of four covers, four original tracks, and previously unreleased tracks from artists Muna and Blessus, apart from the usage of incorporated tracks. Anthony Willis, who composed the film score, also performed the re-imagined orchestral version of the track Britney Spears' single "Toxic". It was originally scheduled for an April 2020 release, but was delayed due to the COVID-19 pandemic.

The album features mostly songs sung by female artists, while also having the involvement of female music creatives, working behind the soundtrack. According to Vice, "the film expertly uses femme pop songs to underscore its critically acclaimed twisted tale of trauma and revenge". Susan Jacobs supervised the film's soundtrack, with Willis and Fennell compiling the tracks in the album. Cyn's original track "Drinks" was released as a first single during March 2020, in anticipation with the album and film's April release. The other tracks: "Nothing's Gonna Hurt You Baby", "Uh-Oh", "Come and Play With Me", "Last Laugh" and "It's Raining Men" were subsequently released on October 20, November 13, 23, December 1 and 3, respectively.

Critics praised the use of pop music, and the selective use of female artists in the soundtrack. Despite being initially shortlisted for Best Compilation Soundtrack for Visual Media at the 64th Annual Grammy Awards, it could not get selected.

== Production ==
=== Background ===
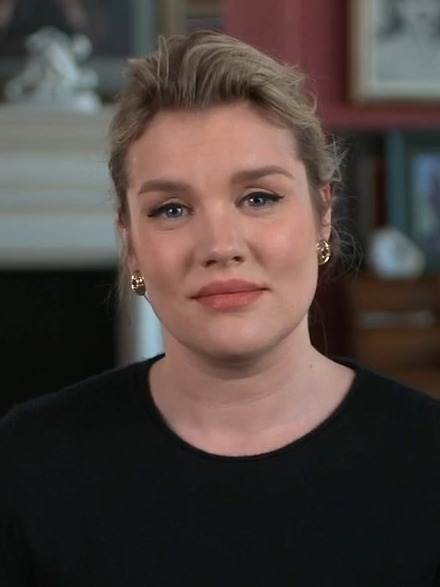
Writer-director Emerald Fennell also served as executive music producer on Promising Young Woman, selecting for its soundtrack several pop songs she had listened to while scripting the film.

Fennell explained that she grew up listening to the pop soundtracks of Romeo + Juliet, Clueless, Can't Hardly Wait and Empire Records, which led her through a wide range of emotions, including love, heartbreak, and humiliation. For her directorial debut, she wanted to have pop songs on the soundtrack, and insisted Susan Jacobs supervise the soundtrack. Fennell was the executive soundtrack producer and jointly compiled the album with score composer Anthony Willis.

Jacobs stated the soundtrack had similarities to her work on Little Miss Sunshine, where "the tone and color of what you see onscreen belies the darkness of what is transpiring." Fennell curated a playlist of songs she had listened to while she wrote the script, and sent it to lead actress Carey Mulligan. Fennell used the 2006 Paris Hilton song "Stars Are Blind" as an integral part of the script, playing as Cassie (Mulligan) and Ryan (Bo Burnham) sing the song in a pharmacy. In an interview, Jacobs told Vulture: "It was great because it had sincerity to it. Nobody was making fun. It was about that character falling in love with a guy who was so confident in his masculinity that he felt comfortable enough to sing one of her favorite pop songs." The scene was shot after principal photography was completed, with a minimal amount of the budget remaining. Mulligan stated in an interview with Vice: "Everyone knows the song, but the lyrics are actually really difficult to learn because they're quite abstract."

The Charli XCX song "Boys" was also a key part of the script, for a scene opening the film. Jacobs said about Fennell filming the song: "The way she shot it with crotch shots all over, it's hysterical!" The Droeloe remix of "Boys" is featured on the soundtrack. Jacobs worked with Capitol Records to include tracks by some lesser-known artists. These include DeathbyRomy's original song "Come and Play With Me" and their cover version of The Weather Girls hit "It's Raining Men", and Fletcher's "Last Laugh". Also featured, from Capitol's catalogue: The 1982 hit cover of "Angel of the Morning" by Juice Newton. In the original script, Mulligan sings a cover of "Can't Help The Way I Feel", but the original version by Lily & Madeleine appears on the soundtrack.

=== Development ===
"When I go through something that changes my life, you feel like you can never get to be you again. It's a new version of you. I would use some of the lyrics I wrote for Cassie (Mulligan) as empowerment that she gave me while watching the movie. I wanted the verses to have strength and confidence."

— Cyn, in an interview to Variety, speaking on the composition for the original track "Drinks"

Two of the original songs were written by Cyn, who said in an interview to Variety, "Being able to see the whole movie and the scene with the music muted can be such a gift if you know what you want to do with the music. It's like coloring in the lines of a coloring book. Just like with 'Drinks,' the songs couldn't have come to life as quickly as they did without seeing the movie. And if you listen to 'Uh Oh,' the whole movie is in the second verse."

Willis, apart from composing the score, had recorded the orchestral version of Britney Spears' "Toxic". For the track, he used a string quartet arrangement and slowed down the track liner, to get a "disconnect of a song that you normally associate being really fun in a very unpleasant setting". He claimed about the lyrical connection, that "one does not understand the lyrics, but instead it gets through one's head".

In addition to having female artists, mostly contributing to the soundtrack, the album also had the involvement of prominent female music executives, creative heads and technicians on board. Jenny Swiatowy, SVP, head of creative sync at Capitol Music Group said "The film speaks to women and our experiences in the world, and the things unfortunately many of us go through. So it was important that it came from that perspective." CMG Chief Executive Anton Monstead, said to Variety: "I'm excited by this album because it's a strong body of work by a very broad spectrum of really strong female voices, and it was an exciting collaboration [...] To be taken on that journey by Emerald, who as a director really set the bar very high, it was very exciting to try and fulfill that ambition."

== Release ==
=== Singles ===
Cyn's original track "Drinks" was released as a promotional music video single on March 6, 2020, through YouTube. It was first released from the album as a single, in anticipation with the April 2020 release date. Speaking about the track Cyn opined that the song "and the movie complement one another thematically. For example, both pieces reveal moments of friendship, allegiance, hardship, strength, and of course, pose scenarios where drinks are acquired [...] Upon watching the movie, Promising Young Woman, I felt more inspired to finish my song. The chorus was written before I saw the movie, and the verses were written in consideration of the movie—knowing that may make a listening experience a little more interesting."

The first track "Nothing's Gonna Hurt You Baby" was released as a single on October 20. The track is a cover version of Cigarettes After Sex's 2012 album I., performed by Donna Missal, and was earlier featured in the first trailer of the film released in December 2019. Another original track "Uh-Oh" and its music video was released on November 13. The second song "Come and Play With Me" rendered by DeathByRomy was released as a single on November 23. The video-format of the third single, "Last Laugh" performed and featured Fletcher, was released on December 1 through YouTube, while the audio was released on the same day. Prior to the soundtrack's release, DeathByRomy's second song—the cover version of The Weather Girls' 1982 single "It's Raining Men"—was released on December 3.

=== Album ===
==== Standard release ====
The track list for Promising Young Woman (Original Motion Picture Soundtrack) was released on March 6, 2020, by Variety, and the album was scheduled for an April 3 release. The release was halted, as the film's originally scheduled release date of April 17, was deferred ultimately due to the COVID-19 pandemic lockdown. The soundtrack was digitally released on December 4, 2020, by Capitol Records. On October 26, pre-orders for the soundtrack re-started officially on the website of Amazon, and the album was through CD formats on December 25, coinciding with the film's release. The cover art for Universal Music Group's announcement of April 3 soundtrack release, was different from the current album artwork.

== Track listing ==
No.	Title	Writer(s)	Artist(s)	Length
1.	"Boys" (Droeloe remix)	Ari Leff; Cass Lowe; Emily Warren; Ingrid Andress; Jerker Hansson; Michael Pollack	Charli XCX	3:36
2.	"Last Laugh"	Cari Fletcher; Jeremy Dussolliet; Tim Sommers	Fletcher	2:42
3.	"Uh-Oh"	Cynthia Nabozny; Matias Mora; Mia Minichiello	Cyn	3:11
4.	"Selenas"	Maya B	Maya B	3:27
5.	"He Hit Me (And It Felt Like a Kiss)"	Carole King; Gerry Goffin	Carmen DeLeon	2:35
6.	"Nothing's Gonna Hurt You Baby"	Greg Gonzalez	Donna Missal	3:17
7.	"Nihilist"	Josette Maskin; Katie Gavin; Naomi McPherson	Muna	3:25
8.	"It's Raining Men"	Paul Shaffer; Paul Jabara	DeathbyRomy	3:43
9.	"Can't Help the Way I Feel"	Daniel Tashian; Lilian Jurkiewicz; Madeleine Jurkiewicz	Lily & Madeleine	3:14
10.	"Stars Are Blind"	Fernando Garibay; Francisco Saldaña; Wisin; Yandel; Tainy; Ralph McCarthy; Sheppard Solomon; Víctor Cabrera	Paris Hilton	3:58
11.	"Come and Play with Me"	Andrew Robert Rosen; Romy Flores	DeathbyRomy	3:08
12.	"Drinks"	Cynthia; JP Clark; Ryan Daly	Cyn	2:29
13.	"Ur Eyes"	Alex Sholler; Bright Black; Crystal Eyes	Blessus	04:30
14.	"Downhill Lullaby"	Jorge Elbrecht; Sky Ferreira; Tamaryn Brown	Sky Ferreira	5:31
15.	"Angel of the Morning"	Chip Taylor	Juice Newton	4:12
16.	"Toxic"	Cathy Dennis; Christian Karlsson; Henrik Jonback; Pontus Winnberg	Anthony Willis	1:51
Total length:				54:58

=== Vinyl release ===
Two vinyl editions of the soundtracks (double-disc sets) were released by Capitol. The first editions, a red-and-pink colored splatter, featuring the original cover artwork and red-and-pink disc sets was released on February 19, 2021. A multi-colored splatter edition, featured the initially released cover artwork and a multi-colored disc, was released on March 19.

== Reception ==
=== Critical reception ===
Kate Mcland of IndieWire stated, "The film is filled with inspired soundtrack choices – a strings-heavy take on Britney Spears' 'Toxic' teases before it reveals itself at the perfect moment, and an amusing use of an 'It's Raining Men' cover sells Fennell's pitch-black sense of humor early on." The Independent-based editors said that the "soundtrack's impactful aura exceeds its promise all the way to accomplished" and cited Hilton's single "Stars Are Blind" and Anthony Willis' orchestral interpretation of "Toxic" as the most impactful tracks from the album. Camila Barbareto of PopSugar said, "The bubblegum soundtrack acts as a mask for the movie's very serious themes, similarly to how Cassie paints on her red lipstick every night and makes men believe she's wasted, counting down the minutes to when they'll try something without consent. There is so much more lurking beneath the surface, symbolized by Cassie's own juxtaposition of sweet and harmless on the outside, ice-cold revenge on the inside (although not nearly as ice cold as the men)." Rachel West from the Alliance of Women Film Journalists commented "the Promising Young Woman soundtrack is equal parts dark, edgy female rage and catchy, lighthearted pop". Casey Cipriani of Bustle commented, "The soundtrack in Emerald Fennell's directorial debut Promising Young Woman is practically a character itself. The music that plays throughout the film is rooted in fun, bubbly pop that, along with the movie's candy-coated color schemes and frilly feminine costumes, juxtapose its extremely serious and occasionally brutal content." The Daily Beast wrote that "the use of a pop music soundtrack that could only be described as glorious…sees Fennell reveal just how astute she is at co-opting our own pop-culture expectations and biases". Refinery29 stated "the Promising Young Woman soundtrack is full of daring, empowering and straight-up fun tracks".

=== Accolades ===
The soundtrack was shortlisted at the preliminary nominations for Grammy Award for Best Compilation Soundtrack for Visual Media, at the 64th Annual Grammy Awards, simultaneously with Willis' score at the Grammy Award for Best Score Soundtrack for Visual Media category, but could not get selected. The soundtrack fetched an award for Best Soundtrack Album at the 11th Hollywood Music in Media Awards, as well as a nomination in the same category at the St. Louis Film Critics Association awards in 2020.
