= Hang Out with You =

"Hang out with You"

Single by Mary Lambert

from the album Bold
- Released: July 8, 2016
- Recorded: Amherst, Massachusetts, United States
- Genre: Pop
- Length: 3:11
- Label: Tender Heart; ML Sings
- Songwriter(s): Mary Lambert; Michelle Chamuel
- Producer(s): Michelle Chamuel

Mary Lambert singles chronology
"Hands" (2016)	"Hang out with You" (2016)

Music video
- "Hang out with You" on YouTube

"Hang out with You" is a song recorded by American singer-songwriter Mary Lambert. Lambert wrote the song with her then-girlfriend, The Voice contestant Michelle Chamuel, who produced the song. The song runs for three minutes and 11 seconds. "Hang out with You" was released via digital outlets on July 8, 2016, and a music video was uploaded to Lambert's Vevo channel and YouTube on the same day.

== Music and lyrics ==
Lambert posted on her Twitter account that it had taken she and Chamuel three years to develop the song. The song is performed in the key of B major with a tempo of 122 beats per minute. At the time, in her Twitter biography, Lambert stated, "'Hang out with You' is my new single[,] and it promotes irresponsibility."

== Music video ==
The video opens with Lambert lying in bed, calling out of work, as she sings the lines, "I don't wanna go to work / I don't wanna go to sleep / I don't wanna do it, I don't wanna do it." Various dogs are interspersed throughout the video, with Lambert driving one around in her car, walking on the beach, and other activities. Lambert's girlfriend, Michelle Chamuel, makes an appearance in the video. The final 20 seconds of the video show the credits for both the song and clip, along with a message encouraging viewers to adopt animals or rescue them. Logos for the Humane Society of the United States, Maddie's Fund, and the Shelter Pet Project appear at the end of the video.
