= Unsub =

Unsub may refer to:

- Unsub (TV series), a 1989 television series starring David Soul as a forensic investigator
- Unsub Records, an American record label
- "Unknown subject" or "Unidentified subject of an investigation", jargon for person of interest used in some American TV crime shows, notably Criminal Minds
- Unsub, an analytics service by OurResearch to help libraries cancel subscriptions
