= Joby Harte =

British television personality (born 1982)

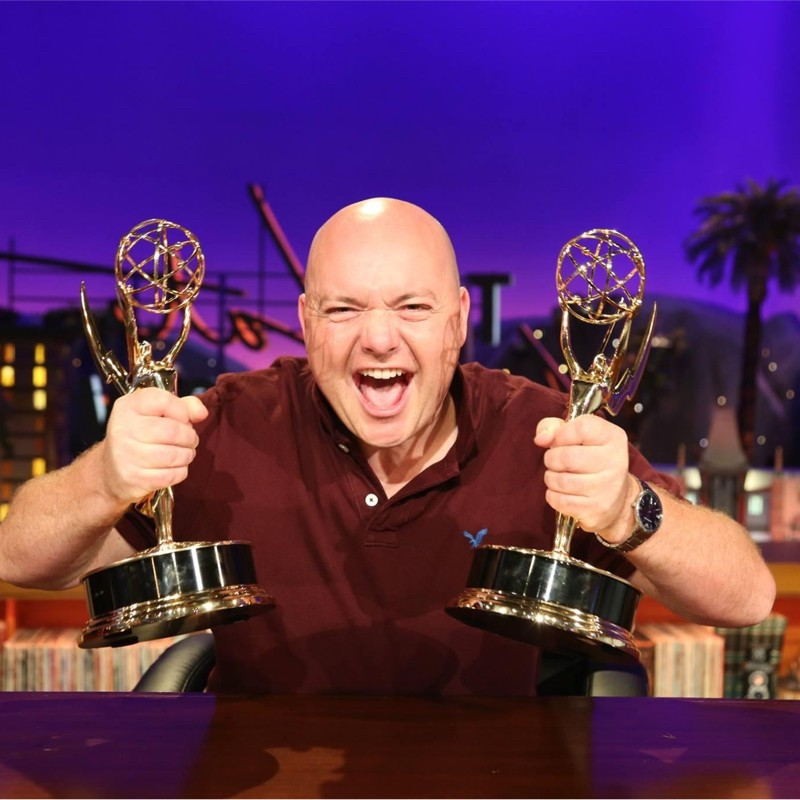

Background information
- Born: 30 January 1982 (age 44)
- Origin: London, England
- Occupation: Producer
- Years active: 1998–present

Joby Harte is a British television personality, producer and talent manager.

== Career ==
=== Acting and producing ===
He has worked on many television shows including the BBC's Strictly Come Dancing. Joby was part of the original production team and played a role in the creation of the worldwide hit reality series Pop Idol along with series producer Ken Warwick.

As a television actor, Harte's credits include "the baker" on the ITV children's show SMTV Live. Before being a warm-up artist, he was a radio presenter and assistant head of music for local UK radio station 97.6 Chiltern FM.

In 2009, Harte created the company Hot Rock Media, Inc. Hot Rock Media acquired offices at the NBC Burbank Studios and partnered with talent managers Paul Cohen and Sheri Anderson Thomas of Cohen Thomas Management. The company became, The Partnership LA, and was representing 22 clients including actors and singers in film and television.

=== TV host ===
Harte was the host of the Hub Network (now Discovery Family) TV show Majors & Minors, which was produced by Brandy Norwood which premiered on 23 September 2011 and ran for 1 season on Hub. The show was created and cohosted by E.Kidd Bogart.

=== Talent management ===
Harte signed and developed many young stars, notably including Amir O'Neil (NBC's Marlon), Amari O'Neil (ABC's The Wonder Years), Ashely Jewel, GoldieBlox, Brandon Perea, (Universal Pictures, Nope), Joshua Bassett (Disney+, High School Musical: The Musical: The Series), Ricky Garcia (Universal Pictures, Bigger Fatter Liar) Emery Kelly (Netflix, Alexa and Katie) and Disney Channel actor Asher Angel, who was in the WB franchise movie Shazam. Angel played the starring role of Billy Batson in the movie.

In 2018 Harte teamed up with Veteran music manager Johnny Wright to manage the winning act of the ABC primetime series Boyband. The band was named In Real Life and were signed to Hollywood Records where they went on to have short success from 2017 to 2019 and had 9 top 40 hits. They Disbanded in 2020. Harte continues to represent Brady Tutton from the band for Film and TV. Brady Tutton had success with writing on the KPOP platinum album Peaches for KAI. He also represents Chance Perez who most recently portrayed the Black Power Ranger, Javi, in the Netflix reboot.

Harte continued his relationship with Wright and they shared Asher Angel in the music space. They put him with record label Hitco under the eye of musical genius LA Reid. Angels first release with the label was One Thought Away feat Wiz Kalifa which became the number 1 video on YouTube for 3 days. The video was released in April 2019 shortly after the release of the 1st Shazam movie. He would make a few more songs and music videos, several of which debuted on Entertainment Tonight.

Today, along with management, Harte produces motion picture Film and Television through his company Attentive Entertainment.

== Filmography ==
Note: Unless noted, these roles are behind-the-scenes work.

- Majors & Minors: Host
- Baggage
- William & Kate
- Bucket & Skinner's Epic Adventures
- X-Men First Class
- Million Dollar Money Drop
- 1 vs. 100
- Cook or Quit
- The $25,000 Pyramid
- The Newlywed Game
- True Jackson, VP
- BrainSurge
- Dancing with the Stars
- Step It Up and Dance
- Dance on Sunset
- Strictly Come Dancing
- Just the Two of Us
- Russell Brand's Got Issues
- The Russell Brand Show
- TRL
- TOTP
- Big Brother
- Ministry of Mayhem
- SMTV Live
- CD:UK
- Pop Idol
- Diggit
- The Farm
- 1 Leicester Square
- Play the Game
- Shark Infested Custard
- BRIT Awards
- It Started With Swap Shop

== Controversy ==
In 2019, Ricky Garcia (of Best Friends Whenever) filed a lawsuit in Los Angeles against Hart, alleging that he had been raped throughout his teenage years starting when he was 12. The suit indicates that conversations about sexuality turned to sexual assault on an almost weekly basis. In 2024, a Los Angeles jury found Hart liable for childhood sexual abuse, gender violence, and intentional infliction of emotional distress. Garcia was awarded $5.5 million in compensatory damages, and another $1 million in punitive damages.
