= Ferras =

American singer-songwriter (born 1982)

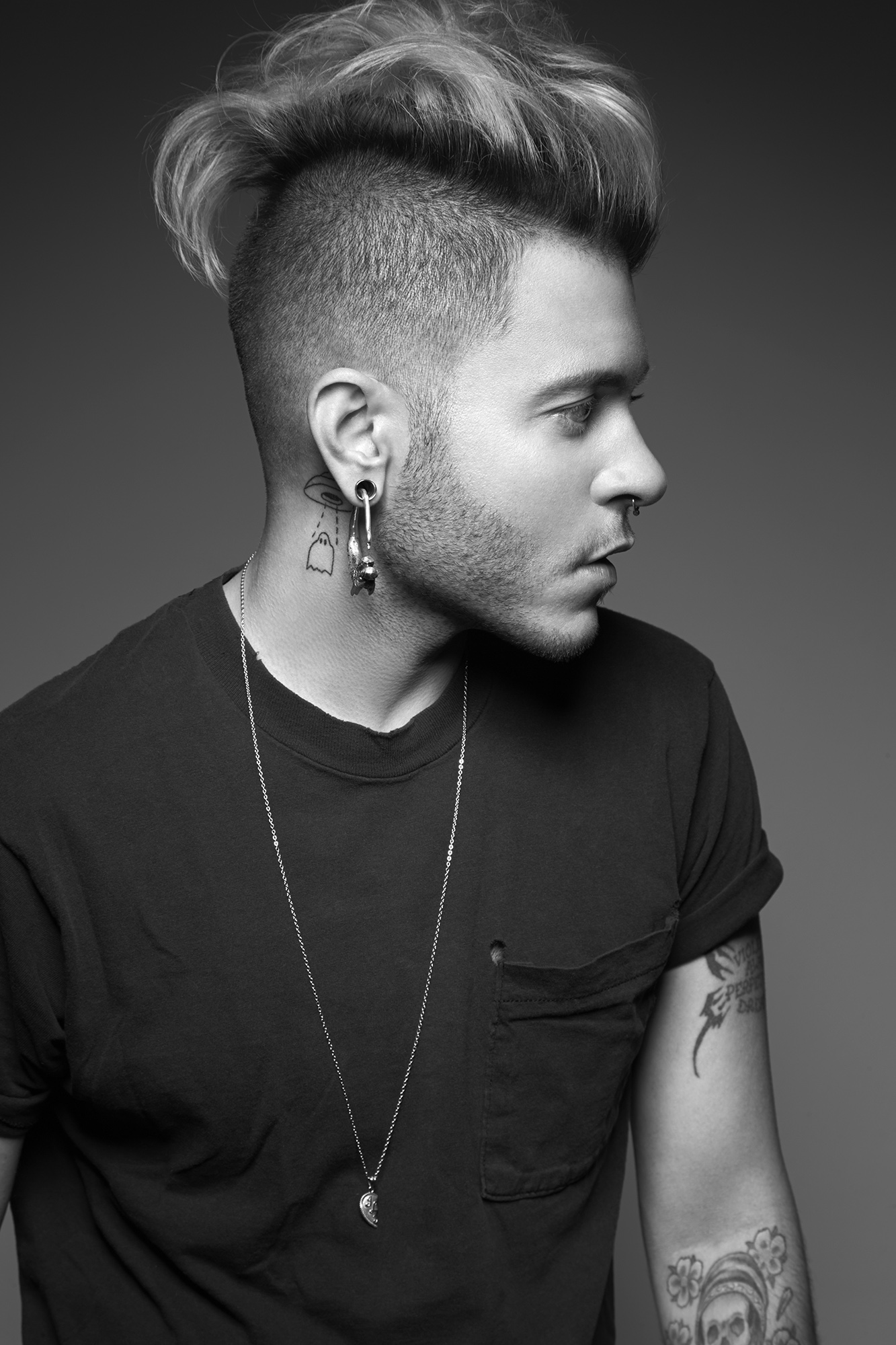

Background information
- Born: Ferras Mahmoud Alqaisi; July 2, 1982 (age 44); Gillespie, Illinois, U.S.
- Origin: Los Angeles, California, U.S.
- Genres: Rock; soft rock; pop rock; piano rock; pop
- Occupation: Singer-songwriter
- Instruments: Vocals; keyboards; piano
- Years active: 2007–present
- Labels: Big 3 Records; Capitol Records; EMI; Unsub Records
- Website: Official Website

Ferras Mahmoud Alqaisi (/fəˈrɑːs/ fə-RAHSS; Arabic: فراس محمود القيسي; born July 2, 1982) is an American singer-songwriter of Jordanian origin. He is well known for his single "Hollywood's Not America" from his debut album Aliens & Rainbows, which was featured as the exit song during the semi-final round of American Idol season 7. He is signed with Unsub Records, a subsidiary of Capitol Records founded by Katy Perry, being the first artist to sign with her label. In June 2014 he released his self-titled EP through the label.

== Early life and education ==
Ferras was born in 1982 in Illinois. After his parents divorced when he was an early age, his father promised him a trip to Disneyland and instead took him back to Amman, Jordan, his father's homeland. His mother eventually succeeded in bringing him back to the United States, eventually moving to Southern California. He also attended the Berklee College of Music in Boston, Massachusetts.

== Career ==
Ferras' career began when he was in Amman with his father. He practiced music on a small keyboard that his father gave him and began to write his own songs. Ferras credits the keyboard for helping him through a lonely time while he was in Jordan. He was 17 when he decided to pursue a career in music, after listening to pop artists such as Britney Spears and 'N Sync. After submitting a demo tape, he was invited to Florida where he signed with a manager and moved to Los Angeles. He performed as Elton John in the reality television Performing As... and was introduced to Fred Durst by the show's vocal coach. Ferras was signed by Durst prior to joining the Berklee College of Music. He was eventually signed to EMI's Capitol Records after an audition for the label's chairman Jason Flom while on spring break.

In April 2008, Ferras released his major record label debut with Aliens & Rainbows via Capitol Records. The album was produced by The Matrix and Gary Clark. The album features the lead single "Hollywood's Not America," which was used as the "exit song" during the semi-final round of the seventh season of the American reality series American Idol before being replaced by a single from Ruben Studdard. The choice gave Ferras a moderate amount of exposure and publicity for the song, which peaked at No. 62 on the Billboard Hot 100. He also performed the song during his first national television performance on The Today Show.

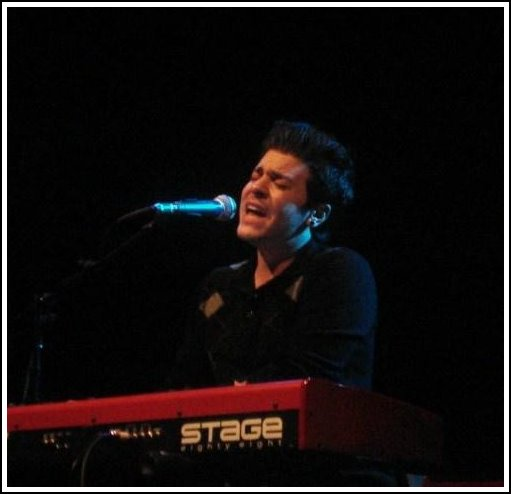
Ferras in concert in 2008

Ferras released an independent EP entitled "Interim" on July 2, 2010. The EP consisted of five original acoustic songs recorded as a live performance in a studio setting.

The year 2010 was also a big year for his songwriting. He co-wrote the song "Aftermath" for Adam Lambert's debut CD For Your Entertainment. In late September 2010, the song was a #1 single in Finland. In June 2010, Australian singer Michael Paynter released the song "Love the Fall" featuring The Veronicas which was co-written by Ferras and Gary Clark. It became the most added song to Australian radio in the first week of July and was the first top-20 single on the ARIA chart for Paynter, and was later certified Platinum.

Ferras continued concentrating on songwriting and in January 2011, German singer Lena Meyer-Landrut performed the song "Good News" which was co-written by Ferras and Audra Mae for the Eurovision Song Contest 2011. Four tracks co-written by Ferras were also included on the Ricky Martin record "Musica+Alma+Sexo" which was released on February 1, 2011. Ferras co-wrote the song "Galaxy" with Richard Vission and was released as a duet by Australian recording artists Jessica Mauboy and Stan Walker in 2011. The song was released digitally in October 2011 as the fifth single from Mauboy's second studio album. It peaked at number 13 on the Aria Singles Chart and number seven on the Aria Urban Singles Chart. It was certified platinum by the Australian Recording Industry Association (ARIA) for selling over 70,000 digital copies. "Galaxy" also debuted at number 40 on the New Zealand Singles Chart.

Ferras released his self-titled EP on June 17, 2014, after becoming the first artist to sign with Katy Perry's Metamorphosis Music. He had first met Perry in 2007 when both were artists at Capitol Records. The first single of the album is titled "Speak in Tongues". The album also features a ballad called "Legends Never Die", which is a duet with Ferras and Perry. The EP contains a total of five songs and was released on iTunes. It was also announced that Ferras would be appearing as the support artist on the North American leg and in some shows in the Asian leg of Perry's Prismatic World Tour.

In 2025, Ferras appeared on the Netflix music docu-reality series Hitmakers.

Ferras co-wrote "Eclipse" with Australian singer Delta Goodrem, Jonas Myrin and Michael Fatkin. The song, released as a single on 1 March 2026, was selected to represent Australia at the 70th Eurovision Song Contest in Vienna. In the United Kingdom, the single debuted at number 34 on the UK Singles Downloads Chart on 6 March 2026.

== Discography ==
=== Studio albums ===
Title	Details
Aliens & Rainbows	Released: April 1, 2008

=== Extended plays ===
Title	Details
Interim - The Time Between	Released: July 2, 2010
Ferras	Released: June 17, 2014

=== Singles ===
Title	Year	Producers	Album
"Hollywood's Not America"	2008	The Matrix / Gary Clark	Aliens & Rainbows
"Liberation Day"	2008	The Matrix / Gary Clark	Aliens & Rainbows
"Rush"	2008	The Matrix / Gary Clark	Aliens & Rainbows
"Wall Around My Heart"	2010		Interim - The Time Between
"Speak in Tongues"	2014	Billboard	Ferras
"Closer"	2016	Stuart Crichton	
"Medicine" (featuring Raja Kumari)	2016	Stuart Crichton	
"Coming Back Around"	2018	Greg Wells	

=== Songwriting credits ===
Title	Year	Artist(s)	Producer(s)	Album	Credits
"Aftermath"	2009	Adam Lambert		For Your Entertainment	Co-writer
"Love The Fall"	2010	Michael Paynter (ft. The Veronicas)			Co-writer
"A Un Paso de Tenerte"	2011	Luis Fonsi		Tierra Firme	Co-writer
"Mas"	2011	Ricky Martin		Música + Alma + Sexo	Co-writer
"Te Busco y Te Alcanzo"	2011	Ricky Martin		Música + Alma + Sexo	Co-writer
"Sera Sera"	2011	Ricky Martin		Música + Alma + Sexo	Co-writer
"No Te Miento"	2011	Ricky Martin		Música + Alma + Sexo	Co-writer
"Freak of Nature" (Ralphi Rosario's Big Room Club Vocal Mix)	2011	Ricky Martin			Co-writer
"Good News"	2011	Lena Meyer-Landrut		Good News	Co-writer
"Electric Misfit Love Machine"	2011	Ultraviolet Sound		Ultraviolet Sound	Co-writer
"Galaxy"	2011	Jessica Mauboy & Stan Walker		Let the Music Play	Co-writer
"Floorplay"	2012	Catalin Josan ft. Iuliana Puschila			Co-writer
"Aun No Se"	2014	Noel Scharjis		Verte Nacer	Co-writer
"Queen of Swords"	2016	Idina Menzel		Idina	Co-writer
"Lady & Her Man"	2016	Tiffany		A Million Miles	Co-writer
"Born To Love U"	2017	Empire Cast ft. Jussie Smollett			Co-writer
"Genesis"	2017	Dua Lipa	Axident	Dua Lipa	Co-writer
"Bon Appétit" (featuring Migos)	2017	Katy Perry	Max Martin / Shellback / Oscar Holter	Witness	Co-writer
"Deja Vu"	2017	Katy Perry	Hayden James	Witness	Co-writer
"Roulette"	2017	Katy Perry	Max Martin / Shellback / Ali Payami	Witness	Co-writer
"Into Me You See"	2017	Katy Perry	Dustin O'Halloran	Witness	Co-writer
"Two Fux"	2017	Adam Lambert	Big Taste		Co-writer
"Wir brechen das Schweigen"	2017	Helene Fischer		Helene Fischer (album)	Co-writer
"I Come In Pieces"	2017	Alisan Porter		I Come In Pieces	Co-writer
"Material Boy"	2017	Allie Simpson			Co-writer
"Xxpen$ive"	2017	Erika Jayne	Space Primates	N/A	Co-writer
"Body Adi"	2018	Roshelle			Co-writer
"Spaceman"	2018	Chloe Black			Co-writer
"Signs"	2018	Starley			Co-writer
"Lonely Star"	2018	Ariana and the Rose			Co-writer
"Cozy Little Christmas"	2018	Katy Perry	Greg Wells	N/A	Co-writer
"Immortal Flame"		Katy Perry			Co-writer
"Dime Que No Te Iras"	2019	Luis Fonsi			Co-writer
"Harder"	2019	Keala Settle			Co-writer
"Extra Fries"	2019	Ilira			Co-writer
"Now Or Never"	2019	HAYES, Mugisho			Co-writer
"Brain"	2019	Drax Project	Jordan Palmer	Drax Project	Co-writer
"See The Way"	2019	The Chainsmokers ft. Sabrina Claudio		World War Joy	Co-writer
"Lento"	2019	David Bisbal		En Tus Planes	Co-writer
"Cold"	2020	Matt Simons			Co-writer
"Wanderlust"	2020	Meghan Kabir			Co-writer
”Smile”	2020	Katy Perry	Josh Abraham, Oligee & G Koop	Smile	Co-writer
”Resilient”	2020	Katy Perry	Stargate	Smile	Co-writer
”Tucked”	2020	Katy Perry	Johan Carlsson & John Ryan	Smile	Co-writer
"Heavy"	2020	CXLOE	Andrew Wells	Single	Co-writer
"Judgin' to Jesus"	2020	RaeLynn	Cory Crowder	Baytown	Co-writer
"Atmosphere"	2023	Drax Project	Cory Enemy, Drax Project, Neil MacLeod	Single	Co-writer
"Scared of Heights"	2024	Hera Björk	Michael Burek	Single	Co-writer
"Silverlines"	2024	Damiano David	Labrinth	Funny Little Fears	Co-writer
"258"	2025	Yeji		Air	Co-writer
"Love Me to Heaven"	2025	Jonas Brothers	Joshua Murty	Single	Co-writer
"Eclipse"	2026	Delta Goodrem	Michael Fatkin	Single	Co-writer
