= Hollywood's Not America =

Single by Ferras

from the album Aliens & Rainbows
- Released: January 29, 2008
- Recorded: 2007
- Genre: Soft rock, pop rock, piano rock
- Length: 3:15
- Label: EMI, Capitol Records
- Songwriters: Ferras, Cory M.H., Spock
- Producers: The Matrix and Gary Clark

Ferras singles chronology
"Hollywood's Not America" (2008)	"Liberation Day" (2008)

"Hollywood's Not America" is a song by American pop singer/songwriter Ferras and is featured on his debut studio album, Aliens & Rainbows. It was released on January 29, 2008, as the lead single from that album.

Soon after the single's release, it was revealed that "Hollywood's Not America" would feature as the exit music on popular reality TV show American Idol. However, Graham Colton's "Best Days" was used for the first elimination of the semi-finals. Additionally, on February 29, 2008, it was announced that "Celebrate Me Home" performed by Ruben Studdard would be the exit song for the current season, in contradiction to earlier reports that "Hollywood's Not America" will be used.

The music video for the single was heavily featured on teen-oriented cable network The N, while a remake/mash-up video was created to promote the Canadian-produced teen drama Degrassi: The Next Generation.

== Charts ==
Chart (2008)	Peak position
Canada (Canadian Hot 100)	89
US Billboard Hot 100	62
US Pop Airplay (Billboard)	29
US Adult Pop Airplay (Billboard)	16
