= I Heart Arlo =

American streaming television series

- Genre: Musical; Adventure comedy
- Created by: Ryan Crego
- Voices of: Michael J. Woodard; Mary Lambert; Jonathan Van Ness; Haley Tju; Brett Gelman; Tony Hale
- Theme music composer: Alex Geringas; Ryan Crego
- Opening theme: "Beautiful Together" by Michael J. Woodard and Mary Lambert
- Composers: Alex Geringas; Ryan Crego
- Country of origin: United States
- Original language: English
- No. of seasons: 1
- No. of episodes: 19

Production
- Executive producer: Ryan Crego
- Producer: Eric Vesbit (Note: Credited as "Line Producer".)
- Editor: John Wall
- Running time: 14–25 minutes
- Production companies: Titmouse, Inc.; Creegs, Inc.; Netflix Animation Studios

Original release
- Network: Netflix
- Release: August 27, 2021

Related
- Arlo the Alligator Boy

I Heart Arlo (stylized as I ♥ Arlo) is an American animated musical adventure comedy television series created by Ryan Crego for Netflix. A follow-up to the 2021 film Arlo the Alligator Boy, the series premiered on August 27, 2021.

== Premise ==
Following the film Arlo the Alligator Boy, I Heart Arlo follows Arlo and his newfound crew set up shop in an abandoned seaside neighborhood and help bring it back to life.

== Voice cast ==
=== Main ===
- Michael J. Woodard as Arlo Beauregard, an optimistic 15-year-old human-alligator hybrid boy with a passion for singing.
- Mary Lambert as Bertie, Arlo's large best friend.
- Jonathan Van Ness as Furlecia, a furball who owns a hair salon.
- Haley Tju as Alia, a hyperactive teenage tiger girl who drives her own bus.
- Brett Gelman as Marcellus, a sullen reverse merman.
- Tony Hale as Teeny Tiny Tony, a rodent-like creature who owns the local pizzeria.

=== Villains ===
- Santigold as the Bog Lady, a villainous swamp goddess who vowed revenge on Arlo for leaving the swamp. She has hypnotizing eyes to hypnotize Arlo for staying with her in the swamp, but Bertie's and Alia's voices manages to snap him out of her trance. She is destroyed when Edmee uses her bombs to make the shack explode, and she melts into nothingness after she tried to devour Arlo and the others as they escaped from her.

=== Recurring ===
- Vincent Rodriguez III as Ansel Beauregard, a bird-man and Arlo's biological father.
- Annie Potts as Edmée, a local swamp hermit and Arlo's adoptive mother.
- Fred Tatasciore as Jeromio, Arlo's pet bullfrog who moves in with him early in the series.
- Jessica Williams as Elena, the mayor of New York City.
- Cathy Vu as Thao, a mailwoman for Seaside by the Seashore.
- Flea as Ruff, one of Arlo's former adversaries who owns a failing swamp museum.
- Jennifer Coolidge as Stucky, Arlo's other former adversary, and Ruff's partner.
- Melissa Villaseñor as Lily the Lobster Woman, a kleptomaniac half-human, half-lobster hybrid lady, and one of the newest members of SBS. Lily started off as a burden to the locals until Arlo found a use for her larceny skills, as Seaside's new lost and found department.
- Maria Bamford as Tony's con-artist mother, and additional voices.

== Episodes ==
No.	Title	Directed by	Written and storyboard by	Story by	Original release date
1	"Friendship Couch"	Nick Sumida	Angelica "Jelly" Russell and Michelle Xin	Nick Arciaga, Colleen McAllister, Blake Lemons and Eric Rivera	August 27, 2021
Having settled in to Seaside by the Seashore, Arlo thinks it will be easy living on his own. However, he finds it more harder than he can handle. Song: "The Way" by Arlo and Bertie
2	"A Memory of Pizza"	Carder Scholin	Katie Hood and Maha Tabikh	Eric Rivera	August 27, 2021
When the Mayor of New York City comes to visit Seaside, Arlo and the gang do their best to impress her so their home does not get shut down.
3	"Be the Turtle"	Angelica "Jelly" Russell and Nick Sumida	Katie Hood and Maha Tabikh	Colleen McAllister	August 27, 2021
Arlo gives Alia a very important job, but the others do not believe she can focus herself enough to handle it properly. Song: "Slow Walk" by Alia
4	"The Shedding"	Carder Scholin	Nathanael H. Jones and Mariana Yovanovich	Eric Rivera	August 27, 2021
When Arlo starts shedding his scales, his friends mistake it for a ghost, and he tries to hide the truth to avoid getting embarrassed.
5	"Community Garden"	Blake Lemons	Dodge Greenley and Angelica "Jelly" Russell	Eric Rivera and Clay Senechal	August 27, 2021
When Bertie finds a quiet place where she can be by herself, Arlo spreads the word about it, turning it into a community garden. Songs: "Community Garden" by Arlo; "Even In A Garden" by Bertie
6	"Blow Out"	Nick Sumida	Written by : Andy Cung, Colleen McAllister, Dakota McFadzean and Nick Sumida; Storyboarded by : Andy Cung and Dakota McFadzean	Nick Arciaga	August 27, 2021
Furlecia asks Arlo to step in as an assistant when her job at her salon becomes a handful.
7	"In the Blue with You"	Carder Scholin	Angelica "Jelly" Russell and Michelle Xin	Colleen McAllister	August 27, 2021
While on a father-son fishing trip with Ansel, Arlo is worried when his dad does no seemingly excited to spend time with him. Song: "In the Blue" by Arlo and Ansel
8	"Jeromio, Jeromio"	Nick Sumida	Nathan Bulmer and Michelle Lam	Nick Arciaga, Blake Lemons and Colleen McAllister	August 27, 2021
When Arlo's pet frog Jeromio becomes increasingly depressed, he tries to find out why.
9	"Make a Fish"	Carder Scholin	Nathan Bulmer and Michelle Lam	Nick Arciaga	August 27, 2021
After Marcellus secretly grants a wish for Bertie, he uses the central fountain as an opportunity to become rich from the other wish-makers. Song: "Marcellus Opera" by Marcellus
10	"Frogday the 13th"	Nick Sumida	Nathanael H. Jones and Mariana Yovanovich	Nick Arciaga	August 27, 2021
Arlo asks Bertie to watch Jeromio while he is away, and she finds the job easier said than done.
11	"Swamp Itch"	Carder Scholin	Nathan Bulmer and Michelle Lam	Blake Lemons	August 27, 2021
Arlo comes down with a severe case of "swamp itch" and Ansel tries to heal him, but keeps causing more trouble.
12	"Moody Tuesday"	Angelica "Jelly" Russell and Nick Sumida	Nathanael H. Jones and Mariana Yovanovich	Colleen McAllister	August 27, 2021
A drop of ice cream causes Bertie to become moody and sour, and it soon spreads to the rest of Seaside. Song: "I Can Lift You Up" by Bertie and Arlo
13	"Lily Lost & Found"	Angelica "Jelly" Russell and Nick Sumida	Nathan Bulmer and Michelle Lam	Nick Arciaga	August 27, 2021
Arlo encounters a visiting half-lobster woman who has a habit of taking things that are not hers.
14	"Stay Cool"	Carder Scholin	Katie Hood and Maha Tabikh	Colleen McAllister and Eric Rivera	August 27, 2021
When a heatwave strikes, Arlo's friends convince him to take Ansel's yacht out for a refreshing ride.
15	"Tony Baloney"	Angelica "Jelly" Russell and Nick Sumida	Nathan Bulmer and Michelle Lam	Nick Arciaga	August 27, 2021
When Tony's parents visit, he fears they will hate him because he is not a con artist, so Arlo and the gang help him keep up the act.
16	"Get Lost!"	Carder Scholin	Andy Cung and Dakota McFadzean	Colleen McAllister	August 27, 2021
With Seaside's Uncondemning party coming, Bertie searches for inspiration to write the perfect song, but winds up in a game with Arlo and the others which strands them in the city. Song: "Just Another Night In New York" by Bertie
17	"Goin' it Arlone"	Angelica "Jelly" Russell	Andy Cung and Dakota McFadzean	Nick Arciaga	August 27, 2021
In trying to help prepare Seaside for the Uncondemning in time, Arlo goes to great lengths to modify the boardwalk's Ferris wheel. Song: "Coming Together" by Arlo, Bertie, Furlecia, Alia, Tony and Marcellus
18	"Alro"	Carder Scholin	Andy Cung and Dakota McFadzean	Grant Lossi	August 27, 2021
When a package goes missing, Arlo and Bertie must work to solve the mystery where it went, not knowing an even bigger mystery is on their hands.
19	"The Uncondemning"	Angelica "Jelly" Russell, Carder Scholin and Nick Sumida	Written by : Colleen McAllister; Storyboarded by : Ashlyn Anstee, Katie Hood, Nathanael H. Jones, Sam Lane, Maha Tabikh and Mariana Yovanovich	Blake Lemons and Colleen McAllister	August 27, 2021
After hearing Edmee is being held hostage by Ruff and Stucky who demand ransom, Arlo and his friends return to the swamp where he is raised to rescue her and face down a mysterious creature known as the Bog Lady. Songs: "Back To You" by Arlo; "Ruff and Stucky" by Ruff and Stucky; "The Bog Lady" by the Bog Lady; "As Long As We Got Each Other" by Arlo, Bertie and everyone

== Soundtrack ==
I Heart Arlo: Music From The Netflix Series

Soundtrack album
- Released: August 27, 2021
- Recorded: 2020
- Genres: Pop, pop soul, electropop, synth pop
- Label: Capitol Records

No.	Title	Performer(s)	Length
1.	"As Long As We Got Each Other"	Michael J. Woodard; Mary Lambert	2:12
2.	"Coming Together"	Woodard; Lambert	2:29
3.	"Slow Walk"	Haley Tju	2:30
4.	"Back To You"	Woodard	2:51
5.	"I Can Lift You Up"	Lambert; Woodard	2:35
6.	"Community Garden"	Woodard	2:28
7.	"Even In A Garden"	Lambert	1:28
8.	"The Way"	Woodard; Lambert	2:46
9.	"In The Blue"	Woodard; Vincent Rodriguez III	2:43
10.	"Just Another Night In New York"	Lambert	2:20
11.	"The Bog Lady"	Santigold	2:02
12.	"Ruff And Stucky"	Jennifer Coolidge; Flea	1:39
