= Cyn =

American singer and songwriter (born 1993)

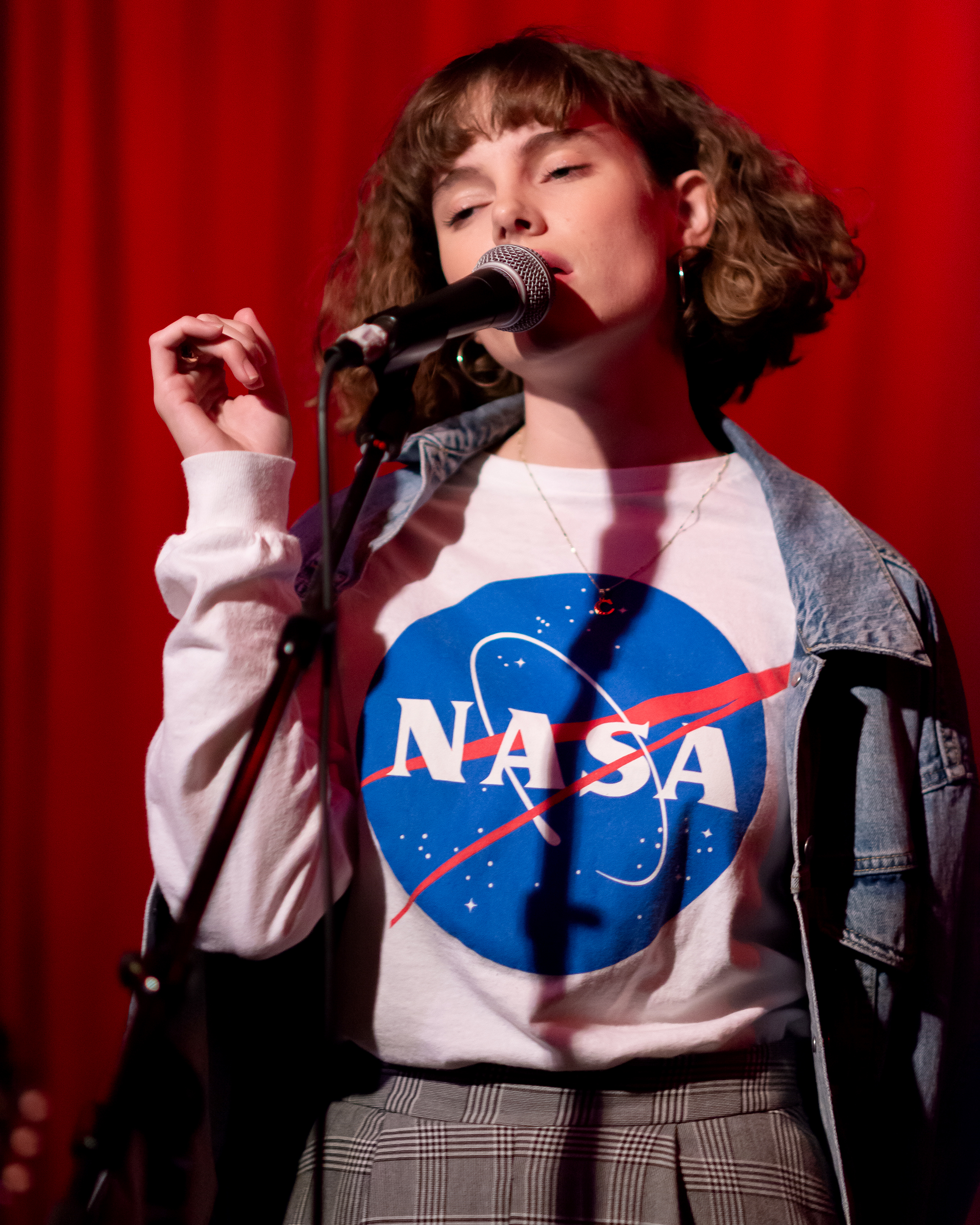
- Cyn performing in 2018
- Born: Cynthia Nabozny; May 13, 1993 (age 32); Michigan, U.S.
- Occupations: Singer, songwriter
- Partner: Kyle Newman (2020–present)
- Children: 2
- Musical career
- Genres: Pop; Indie folk
- Labels: Unsub
- Website: www.cynsings.com

Cynthia "Cyn" Nabozny (born May 13, 1993) is an American singer and songwriter.

== Early life ==
Cyn was born on May 13, 1993, in Michigan. She has described her parents' divorce, which occurred when she was a toddler, as "a big driver of her love for music." By age 16, she was recording and doubling her own vocals. After failing to get into DePaul University's music program, she graduated from the university in Management Information Systems.

== Personal life ==
She began a relationship with filmmaker Kyle Newman in 2020. They have a son, born February 2021 and a daughter born in 2023.

== Career ==
In September 2015, she wrote the song "Only With You", which she performed two months later for Katy Perry. She was subsequently signed by Perry's record label, Unsub Records. Two years after its conception, "Only With You" was released as a single. Her debut single under Unsub was "Together" released in July 2017. Throughout 2018 Cyn opened for Perry's Witness: The Tour across Mexico, made her Bonnaroo debut and toured North America with Years & Years. That year her single "Moment of Truth" was also part of the animated feature film Smallfoot.

Cyn released her debut E.P Mood Swing in September 2019. The seven-track release included songs co-written and produced by both Lars Stalfors and Matias Mora. Cyn describes the work as a "Parisian park" and that most of the songs on it, including lyrics and melody, are built around a single sentence, the "thesis statement". A year later she released a reimagined version of the E.P titled Mood Swing (even moodier).

In February 2020, Cyn released "Lonely Gun" as part of the original motion picture soundtrack for DC's Birds of Prey, and her song "I Can't Believe" was included as part of the soundtrack for To All the Boys: P.S. I Still Love You.

Cyn wrote and recorded the songs "Drinks" and "Uh-Oh" for the 2020 Oscar-winning motion picture Promising Young Woman. "Drinks" spent two months at U.S. Top 40 Radio, peaking at #22 in July 2020. That June, Cyn released The Mixed Drinks Collection which featured a stripped-down reworking of the song, along with remixes from NERVO, Ladyhawke, MNDR and Uffie. "Drinks" continued to grow in popularity throughout the following year and was featured prominently in high-profile shows Inventing Anna and Gossip Girl.

In August 2021, Cyn recorded a cover version of Sixpence None the Richer's "Kiss Me" for the Netflix film soundtrack of He's All That (2021) and in March 2022 released a version of the Karen Elson & Daniel Tashian penned song "Heaven Shine A Light" for the HBO Max original film, Moonshot.

2022 saw Cyn release two singles, "House with a View" and "Losing Sleep" as she continued working on her full-length debut album.

Her debut album 'Valley Girl' was released via Unsub/Capitol Records in Nov 2024.

== Artistry and influences ==
One of the first songs Cyn enjoyed as a child was "Foolish Games" by Jewel. Alongside Jewel, she considers Sheryl Crow and Rosalía her favorite artists. Her grandmother listened to Doris Day. Having been raised near Detroit, she counts Motown as a major influence. Lorde inspired her to use a stage name.

In 2020, she described early Disney movies as a new influence.

== Discography ==
=== Studio albums ===
Title	Details	Ref.
Valley Girl	Released: November 15, 2024; Label: Unsub Records; Format: Digital download, vinyl	

=== Extended plays ===
Title	Details	Ref.
Mood Swing	Released: September 20, 2019; Label: Unsub Records; Format: Digital download, vinyl	
Mood Swing (even moodier)	Released: September 18, 2020; Label: Unsub Records; Format: Digital download	
Valley Girl (Side A - Lost on Laurel)	Released: September 6, 2024; Label: Unsub Records; Format: Digital download	
Valley Girl (Side B - Los Angeles, No Offense)	Released: November 15, 2024; Label: Unsub Records; Format: Digital download	

=== Singles ===
Title	Year	Album	Ref.
"Together"	2017	Non-album singles	
"Only With You"	2017	Non-album singles	
"Alright"	2018	Non-album singles	
"Believer"	2018	Non-album singles	
"I'll Still Have Me"	2018	Mood Swing	
"Holy Roller"	2019	Mood Swing	
"Terrible Ideas"	2019	Non-album single	
"Never-ending Summer"	2019	Mood Swing	
"Drinks" (Note: Also appears on Promising Young Woman (Original Motion Picture Soundtrack).)	2020	Valley Girl	
"New York"	2020	Non-album single	
"House With a View"	2022	Valley Girl	
"Losing Sleep"	2022	Valley Girl	
"Where Do All the Diamonds Go?"	2023	Valley Girl	
"Growing Up"	2023	Valley Girl	
"Cuz of You" (with Felix Cartal)	2024	I	
"I Don't Care"	2024	Valley Girl	
"Be Like Her"	2024	Valley Girl	
"Crazy"	2024	Valley Girl	
"The Smiths"	2024	Valley Girl (Extended)	

=== Other songs ===
Title	Year	Album	Ref.
"Moment of Truth"	2018	Smallfoot (Original Motion Picture Soundtrack)	
"I Can't Believe"	2019	Mood Swing	
"Angel"	2019	Mood Swing	
"Bubble Bath"	2019	Mood Swing	
"Nobody's Keeping Score"	2019	Mood Swing	
"Lonely Gun"	2020	Birds of Prey: The Album	
"Uh-Oh"	2020	Promising Young Woman (Original Motion Picture Soundtrack)	
"Wonderful"	2021	Pokémon 25: The Album	
"Kiss Me"	2021	He's All That (Music From The Netflix Film)	
"Always Safe"	2021	Music from Pokémon the Movie: Secrets of the Jungle	
"No Matter What"	2021	Music from Pokémon the Movie: Secrets of the Jungle	
"Heaven Shine a Light"	2022	Non-album promotional single	
"Lemons"	2024	Valley Girl	
"Hard to Love"	2024	Valley Girl	
"Love You Like I Want To"	2024	Valley Girl	
"Los Angeles, No Offense"	2024	Valley Girl	
"Sweet"	2024	Valley Girl (Extended)	
"Sink Your Teeth In Your Tongue"	2024	Valley Girl (Extended)	

=== As featured artist ===
Title	Year	Album	Ref.
"Waves" (IHF featuring Cyn)	2014	Floating - EP	
"No More Hesitation" (Sorrow featuring Cyn)	2015	Search of the Miraculous - EP	
"No One Knows" (J.Pennyworth featuring Cyn)	2015	Non-album single	
"Portrait" (Probcause featuring Cyn)	2015	Drifters	
"Take" (Khai featuring Cyn)	2015	If You - EP	
"Cloudy" (Jerms featuring Cyn)	2016	Non-album single	

== Music videos ==
Title	Year	Director(s)	Ref.
"Only With You"	2017		
"Believer"	2018		
"I'll Still Have Me"	2018		
"Terrible Ideas"	2019		
"Holy Roller"	2019	Ally Pankiw	
"I Can't Believe"	2020	Daniel Waynick and Cyn	
"Drinks"	2020	Taylor Fauntleroy	
"House With a View"	2022	Kyle Newman	
"Losing Sleep"	2023	Kyle Newman	
"Where Do All the Diamonds Go?"	2023	Miche Sieg and Rose Chirillo	
"Growing Up"	2023	Janush Libicki	
"I Don't Care"	2024		
"Crazy"	2024		

== Tours ==
Opening act

- Witness: The Tour (Katy Perry) (2018)
- Palo Santo Tour (Years & Years) (2018)
