= Secrets (Mary Lambert song) =

Single by Mary Lambert

from the album Heart on My Sleeve
- Released: July 15, 2014
- Genre: Pop
- Length: 3:43
- Label: Capitol
- Songwriters: Mary Lambert; Eric Rosse; Benny Cassette; Maureen McDonald
- Producers: Eric Rosse; Benny Cassette

Mary Lambert singles chronology
"She Keeps Me Warm" (2013)	"Secrets" (2014)	"Hang out With You" (2016)

Music video
- "Secrets" on YouTube

"Secrets" is a song recorded by American recording artist Mary Lambert. Lambert co-wrote the song with MoZella and the song's producers, Eric Rosse and Benny Cassette; B.o.B contributed his own verse to the featured version. It was released July 15, 2014 through Capitol Records as the lead single from Lambert's debut major-label album, Heart on My Sleeve (2014). A remix featuring American hip hop artist B.o.B was released August 19, 2014.

== Content ==
"Secrets" is primarily a pop song, but also draws on elements of hip hop in Lambert's "sing-talk" delivery and B.o.B's rap verse. It is composed in the key of C major and is set to a moderate tempo of approximately 93 BPM. The song features confessional lyrics based on Lambert's real-life insecurities, ranging from dysfunctional family situations to her homosexuality, with an overarching message of acceptance and self-empowerment.

== Chart performance ==
"Secrets" debuted at number 39 on the Billboard Adult Pop Songs chart dated August 2, 2014. It debuted at number 92 on the Billboard Hot 100 for the week ending September 20, 2014 and peaked at number 66 for the week ending November 8.

=== Weekly charts ===
Chart (2014)	Peak position
Australia (ARIA)	39
Iceland (Tonlist)	17
New Zealand (Recorded Music NZ)	40
US Billboard Hot 100	66
US Adult Contemporary (Billboard)	18
US Adult Pop Airplay (Billboard)	12
US Dance Club Songs (Billboard)	1
US Pop Airplay (Billboard)	26

=== Year-end charts ===
Chart (2014)	position
US Adult Top 40 (Billboard)	42
US Dance Club Songs (Billboard)	36

== Release history ==
Country	Date	Format(s)	Ref.
United States	July 10, 2014	Hot adult contemporary	
Canada	July 15, 2014	Digital download	
United States	July 15, 2014	Digital download	
Canada	August 19, 2014	Digital download (Remix featuring B.o.B)	
United States	August 19, 2014	Digital download (Remix featuring B.o.B)	
United States	August 19, 2014	Contemporary hit radio	
Australia	September 18, 2014	Digital download	

== See also ==
- List of number-one dance singles of 2014 (U.S.)
