= Arlo the Alligator Boy =

2021 American animated film by Ryan Crego

- Promotional poster
- Directed by: Ryan Crego
- Screenplay by: Ryan Crego; Clay Senechal
- Story by: Ryan Crego
- Starring: Michael J. Woodard; Mary Lambert; Haley Tju; Jonathan Van Ness; Brett Gelman; Tony Hale; Annie Potts; Flea; Jennifer Coolidge; Vincent Rodriguez III
- Edited by: Karen White
- Music by: Alex Geringas (score and songs); Ryan Crego (songs)
- Production companies: Netflix Animation Studios; Titmouse, Inc.
- Distributed by: Netflix
- Release date: April 16, 2021
- Running time: 90 minutes
- Country: United States
- Language: English

Arlo the Alligator Boy is a 2021 American animated musical adventure comedy film directed by Ryan Crego in his directorial debut. The film is led by Michael J. Woodard and Mary Lambert in their debut acting roles as Arlo and Bertie respectively. The plot follows a young alligator boy who leaves his home from a swamp to search for his long lost father as he makes friends along the way.

The film premiered on Netflix on April 16, 2021, and received positive reviews from critics. The film was followed by a streaming television series titled I Heart Arlo in August 2021.

== Plot ==
Arlo Beauregard, a boy who is half-human and half-alligator, is placed in a sewage drain under New York City shortly after his birth, where he is taken by a stream of water into the ocean. Arriving in a swamp, Arlo is adopted and raised by a woman named Edmée. As a teenager, Arlo wishes to interact with other people but fears his alligator appearance will not be accepted by society. Edmée gives him his birth wristband on his fifteenth birthday and reveals to Arlo that he is from New York, and unaware that he was actually abandoned, Arlo decides to travel to the city to find his biological father, Ansel Beauregard.

While traveling, Arlo is spotted by a person who contacts two poor alligator hunters, Ruff and Stucky, to retrieve him using a creature known as "the Beast". After the hunters find him, Arlo is rescued by Bertie, who is also a teenager. At a wrestling club, the pair meet Furlecia, Teeny Tiny Tony, and Alia, who agree to drive Arlo and Bertie to NYC after they help rescue their friend Marcellus from an aquarium.

Arriving in NYC, the group spots Ansel Beauregard, an entrepreneur who announces his plan to rebuild part of the city near the seashore. Leaving his group after finding a way to talk to him, Arlo is told by Ansel that he is not his son, but Arlo disagrees. In an attempt to help, Ansel reveals his project to remodel the seashore environment of NYC into a large city, and tries to get Arlo to change his image, shocking him, and sends him away. Disappointed and alone, Arlo enters a sewage drain and is later found by the rest of his group at the same seashore site for Ansel's project, who then teach them that no matter how different he is, his flaws are what makes him who he is.

At the Met Gala that evening, Arlo and his friends break in but are secretly followed by Ruff, Stucky and the Beast. Soon after, Arlo interrupts the gala and Ansel tries to tell him the truth. However, Arlo is then captured by Ruff and Stucky. After Ansel manages to rescue Arlo, he reveals to the audience that he is, in fact, Arlo's father and also a half-bird. He explains he only gave him up just to hide his half-animal identity and wants Arlo to forgive him to start over their kinship. Delighted, Arlo hugs his father and forgives him, but turns down living with him in favor of living with his friends instead, and accepts Bertie as a member of the group as well. Additionally, Ansel decides to let them move to and rebuild the seashore part of the city as it was in better condition, and Arlo officially accepts it as where he truly belongs.

In a mid-credits scene, Edmée receives a postcard and learns about Arlo's new life.

== Voice cast ==
- Michael J. Woodard as Arlo Beauregard, an alligator boy
- Mary Lambert as Bertie, a kind teenage human giantess
- Haley Tju as Alia, a tiger girl
- Jonathan Van Ness as Furlecia, a pink flamboyant furball-like creature
- Brett Gelman as Marcellus, a fish creature with legs who does not like children
- Tony Hale as Teeny Tiny Tony, a rodent-like creature and con artist
- Annie Potts as Edmée, Arlo's adoptive mother
- Flea as Ruff, an alligator-hunting hillbilly
- Jennifer Coolidge as Stucky, an alligator-hunting hillbilly and Ruff's partner
- Vincent Rodriguez III as Ansel Beauregard, Arlo's biological father and billionaire
- Fred Tatasciore as the Beast, a dog-like monster owned by Ruff & Stucky

== Production ==
The film was announced by Netflix in November 2020 with Ryan Crego as director. The film's soundtrack was released by Capitol Records on April 16, 2021.

Track listing

No.	Title	Performer(s)	Length
1.	"More More More"	Michael J. Woodard	2:13
2.	"Happy Birthday to Ya"	Annie Potts	0:45
3.	"Beyond These Walls"	Woodard	2:27
4.	"More More More (Reprise)"	Woodard	0:26
5.	"Follow Me Home (Intro)"	Woodard; Mary Lambert	0:22
6.	"Follow Me Home"	Woodard; Lambert	3:34
7.	"New York, My Home"	Ryan Crego	0:45
8.	"Right There with You"	Rudi Alizah Gutierrez	2:10
9.	"Better Life"	Vincent Rodriguez III	2:49
10.	"The Collage of Broken Dreams"	Woodard	1:39
11.	"Wash the Hurt Away"	Woodard	2:13
12.	"Something's Missing"	Woodard; Rodriguez III	2:56
13.	"Beautiful Together"	Woodard; Lambert	2:42
14.	"Arlo's Journey (Score Suite)"	Alex Geringas	2:53
Total length:			27:46

== Reception ==
=== Critical response ===
On the review aggregator website Rotten Tomatoes, 85% of 20 critics' reviews are positive, with an average rating of 7.3/10. From The New York Times, Amy Nicholson wrote that "Long before the motley crew crashes the Met Gala, it's clear that director Ryan Crego is bolting wacky gee-gaws onto a rote plot" while also stating that "several gags pay off". Writing for Pajiba, Kristy Puchko said the LGBT representation in the film was "not only welcomed but groundbreaking", and gave praise to the storytelling, characters, and animation.

=== Accolades ===
Awards and nominations received by Arlo the Alligator Boy
Award	Date of ceremony	Category	Recipient(s)	Result	Ref.
Annie Awards	March 12, 2022	Outstanding Achievement for Editorial in an Animated Television/Broadcast Production	Steve Downs	Nominated	
Annie Awards	March 12, 2022	Outstanding Achievement for Production Design in an Animated Television/Broadcast Production	Israel Sanchez, Margaret Wuller, Michelle Haejung Park, Kayla Jones, and Tania Franco	Nominated	
Annie Awards	March 12, 2022	Outstanding Achievement for Voice Acting in an Animated Television/Broadcast Production	Michael J. Woodard	Nominated	
Kidscreen Awards	July 19, 2022	Best Holiday or Special Episode	Arlo the Alligator Boy	Nominated	
Hollywood Music in Media Awards	November 17, 2021	Best Original Song in an Animated Film	Ryan Crego and Alex Geringas (for "Follow Me Home")	Nominated	

== Television series ==
The streaming series I Heart Arlo was released on Netflix on August 27, 2021, consisting of 19 episodes.
