= Majors & Minors =

- Created by: Evan Bogart
- Presented by: Joby Harte
- Starring: Evan "Kidd" Bogart; David "DQ" Quinones; Debra Byrd; Alex Larson; Paul Mirkovich
- Country of origin: United States
- No. of seasons: 1
- No. of episodes: 15

Production
- Executive producers: Timothy Scott Bogart; Gary A. Randall; Evan "Kidd" Bogart
- Producers: Brad Bogart; Dave Moorman; Mark Noad; Brad Gilderman
- Running time: 60 minutes
- Production companies: RCA Records; Bug Music; The Boardwalk Entertainment Group

Original release
- Network: The Hub
- Release: September 23, 2011 – January 29, 2012

Majors & Minors is an American reality television singing competition, that premiered on The Hub on September 23, 2011. Auditions were held for 8–16 year olds, and the winner received a chance to have a partnership with Sony's RCA Music Group. BMI was involved with the series. The winner of the show was Michael Woodard.

== Cast ==
=== Contestants ===
Name	Age	City
Grace Jeanette	11	Burbank, CA
Ashley Nicole Greene	10	Oceanside, CA
Sabrina Lentini	13	Tustin, CA
Emily Kocontes	16	Newbury Park, CA
Kennedy Nöel	13	Nashville, TN
Nia Holloway	15	Norcross, GA
Hailey Dibiasi	14	Huntington Beach, CA
Michael Woodard	14	Philadelphia, PA *winner*
Austin Crute	15	Marietta, GA
Brandon Arreaga	11	Corinth, TX
Cameron DeFaria	14	Culver City, CA
Josh Metzler	15	Gilbert, AZ

=== Mentors ===
Name	Occupation
Evan "Kidd" Bogart	Songwriter, Producer
Joby Harte	Host
David "DQ" Quinones	Songwriter, Vocal Producer
Debra Byrd	Vocal coach
Alex Larson	Choreographer
Paul Mirkovich	Musical Director/Composer/Songwriter/Programmer

=== Majors ===
Name	Occupation
Brandy	Actress, R&B/pop singer, songwriter, host, spokesmodel, record producer
Leona Lewis	Singer, songwriter
Avril Lavigne	Singer, songwriter
Colbie Caillat	Singer, songwriter
Sean Kingston	Singer, songwriter
Jordin Sparks	Singer, songwriter, actress
Adam Lambert	Singer, songwriter
Ryan Tedder	Singer, songwriter
Claude Kelly	Singer, songwriter
will.i.am	Rapper, actor, singer, songwriter, producer
Jennifer Hudson	Singer, songwriter, actress, author
Mike Posner	Singer, songwriter

== Episodes ==
No.	Title	Original release date
1	"One World - Part 1"	September 23, 2011
12 kids with musical ambitions are chosen to participate in this reality show, in which music superstars mentor them. Guest star: Brandy
2	"One World - Part 2"	September 30, 2011
The kids meet their first mentor: Brandy. They also perform an original song in front of a live audience. Guest star: Brandy
3	"Party"	October 23, 2011
The cast start writing original songs with help from songwriter Evan Bogart; Ryan Tedder and Leona Lewis make a surprise visit. Guest stars: Leona Lewis and Evan Bogart
4	"Keep Holding On"	October 30, 2011
Avril Lavigne helps the kids with their first cover song, "Keep Holding On". Guest star: Avril Lavigne
5	"Fly Away"	November 6, 2011
Colbie Caillat shares songwriting advice, and the kids learn an original song called "Fly Away". Guest star: Colbie Caillat
6	"Whataya Want From Me"	November 13, 2011
Adam Lambert gives tips on stage presence as the kids cover his hit song, "Whataya Want from Me". Guest star: Adam Lambert
7	"The ABC's"	November 20, 2011
Mike Posner gives the kids tips as they work on a medley of "ABC" and "Right Here Right Now". Guest star: Mike Posner
8	"Anything"	November 27, 2011
The kids sing an original song and meet Jordin Sparks, who shares advice with them and then joins them in a rendition of her song "Battlefield". Guest star: Jordin Sparks
9	"Spin Around the Sun"	December 4, 2011
Sean Kingston visits with the kids. Also: the kids work with songwriter Evan Bogart; and the original song "Spin Around the Sun" is performed. Guest stars: Sean Kingston and Evan Bogart
10	"Unstoppable"	December 11, 2011
Claude Kelly and Ryan Tedder offer songwriting assistance, and then the kids perform the new song "Unstoppable". Guest stars: Claude Kelly and Ryan Tedder
11	"I Just Want to Celebrate"	December 18, 2011
The kids visit Jennifer Hudson and work on singing a medley. Guest star: Jennifer Hudson
12	"Stand by Me"	December 25, 2011
The kids visit will.i.am, who gives them some guidance. Also: a medley is performed. Guest star: will.i.am
13	"Hero"	January 1, 2012
Brandy helps the kids prepare to perform "Hero" in front of their parents. Grace struggles with her emotion. Guest star: Brandy
14	"And the Winner Is... Part 1"	January 22, 2012
In Part 1 of the two-part season finale, the kids regroup after working on their own to prepare for their last performances.
15	"And the Winner Is... Part 2"	January 29, 2012
In the conclusion of the two-part Season 1 finale, one kid gets a record deal after each contestant performs his or her own song in front of a live audience.
