= Aliens & Rainbows =

Studio album by Ferras
- Released: March 11, 2008 (Digital); April 1, 2008 (CD)
- Genre: Rock; pop
- Length: 45:46
- Label: Capitol
- Producer: The Matrix; Gary Clark

Aliens & Rainbows is the debut album by American pop rock singer-songwriter Ferras. It was released digitally on iTunes on March 11, 2008, and in CD format until April 1, 2008. The album was preceded by lead single "Hollywood's Not America". The album's second single was the track "Liberation Day", which failed to chart.

The album's third and final single was the track "Rush", which Ferras performed live with Katy Perry; it also failed to chart. Aliens & Rainbows charted at number 97 on the Billboard 200 selling 5,245 copies. It has since sold over 27,000 copies.

== Critical reception ==
Professional ratings
Review scores
Source	Rating
AbsolutePunk	(77%)
AllMusic	4/5 stars
Billboard	(positive)
Entertainment Weekly	C−
UGO	C+

Jo-Ann Greene of AllMusic wrote that: "Ferras' performances are fabulous throughout, his lyrics thoughtful and eloquent. The themes are mostly personal and occasionally (as on "Dear God" and "My Beautiful Life") questioning, and even the romantic numbers have something new to say. The arrangements are stunning, the sound full, the atmosphere electric—but with a debut this good, where will Ferras possibly go from here?" Mikael Wood, writing for Billboard, called it "an action-packed collection of high-gloss piano-pop production numbers in which the scenery counts for just as much as the sentiment." Gregory Robson of AbsolutePunk commended the first three tracks for showcasing Ferras' musicianship but felt the rest of the album comes across as "forced, perfectly planned and predictable" and suffers from The Matrix's "overambitious, contrived and squeaky clean" production. Entertainment Weekly's Simon Vozick-Levinson gave the album a "C−" grade, saying the best songs off of it are ruined with "overly slick production" and Ferras' vocal performance, concluding with: "Don't hold your breath waiting for gold at the end of these Rainbows."

== Track listing ==
Aliens & Rainbows
No.	Title	Writer(s)	Producer(s)	Length
1.	"Liberation Day"	Ferras Alqaisi; Lauren Christy; Gary Clark; Graham Edwards; Scott Spock	The Matrix; Clark	3:28
2.	"Aliens & Rainbows"	Alqaisi; Christy; Clark; Edwards; Spock	The Matrix; Clark	3:59
3.	"Something About You"	Alqaisi; Christy; Clark; Edwards; Spock	The Matrix; Clark	4:08
4.	"Hollywood's Not America"	Alqaisi; Christy; Clark; Edwards; Spock	The Matrix; Clark	3:15
5.	"Everybody Bleeds the Same"	Alqaisi; Christy; Clark; Edwards; Spock	The Matrix; Clark	3:35
6.	"Rush"	Alqaisi	The Matrix; Clark	4:21
7.	"My Beautiful Life"	Alqaisi; Christy; Clark; Edwards; Spock	The Matrix; Clark	4:35
8.	"Soul Rock"	Alqaisi; Christy; Clark; Edwards; Spock	The Matrix; Clark	4:15
9.	"Blame, Blame, Blame"	Alqaisi; Christy; Clark; Edwards; Spock	The Matrix; Clark	3:01
10.	"Dear God"	Alqaisi	The Matrix; Clark	3:39
11.	"Don't Give Up"	Alqaisi; Christy; Clark; Edwards; Spock	The Matrix; Clark	4:10
12.	"Take My Lips"	Alqaisi	The Matrix; Clark	3:30
Total length:				TBA

== Personnel ==
- Mark Adelman – executive producer, management
- Chris Anokute – executive producer, A&R
- Charlie Bisharat – violin
- Ruth Bruegger – violin
- David Campbell – string arrangements
- Carole Castillo – viola
- Lauren Christy – producer
- Larry Corbett – cello
- Brian Dembow – viola
- Graham Edwards – producer
- Jason Flom – executive producer
- Armen Garabedian – violin
- Serban Ghenea – mixing
- Julian Hallmark – violin
- Victor Indrizzo – drums
- Suzie Katayama – cello, contractor
- Roland Kato – viola
- Natalie Leggett – violin
- Darrin McCann – viola
- Alyssa Park – violin
- Cindi Peters – production coordination
- Michelle Richards – violin
- Steve Richards – cello
- Bettie Ross – copyist
- Phil Sarna – management
- Allen Sides – string engineer
- Scott Spock – producer
- Tereza Stanislav – violin
- Josephina Vergara – violin
- John Wittenberg – violin
- David Wolter – A&R
