= Hands (2016 song) =

Single by various artists
- Released: July 6, 2016
- Recorded: 2016
- Length: 4:24
- Label: Interscope; GLAAD
- Songwriters: Justin Tranter; Julia Michaels; BloodPop
- Producers: BloodPop; Mark Ronson

Lyric video
- "Hands" on YouTube

"Hands" is a charity single recorded by various artists as tribute to victims of the Orlando nightclub shooting. It was written by Justin Tranter, Julia Michaels, and BloodPop, and produced by the latter and Mark Ronson. All of the song's proceeds benefited the families affected during the shooting, and helped cover medical costs and counseling efforts. The song was written a day after the mass shooting occurred.

Approximately 27 artists assisted in the making of "Hands", which was released for download on July 6, 2016. Interscope Records handled the release, allowing artists to use the studios most convenient to them. In addition to Tranter and Interscope, GLAAD also helped with the single. Proceeds from the song were donated to the Equality Florida Pulse Victims Fund, the GLBT Community Center of Central Florida and GLAAD.

== Background ==
"Hands" was conceived by Tranter the following day after the Orlando nightclub shooting occurred. In an interview with Billboard, Tranter stated that each musician was "assigned [...] what we thought would be the best part for their voice". Eventually, over two dozen artists assisted in the making of "Hands", which was released as a download on July 6, 2016. Interscope Records handled the release, with assistance from GLAAD.

== Artists involved ==
Source: Billboard

- Justin Tranter
- Julia Michaels
- Imagine Dragons
- BloodPop
- Britney Spears
- Selena Gomez
- Mark Ronson
- Jennifer Lopez
- Gwen Stefani
- Kacey Musgraves
- Jason Derulo
- Meghan Trainor
- Juanes
- Pink
- Mary J. Blige
- Halsey
- Troye Sivan
- Ty Herndon
- Adam Lambert
- Trans Chorus of Los Angeles
- MNEK
- Alex Newell
- Mary Lambert
- Prince Royce
- Jussie Smollett
- Nate Ruess
- RuPaul

== Track listing ==
Download
No.	Title	Length
1.	"Hands"	4:23

== Charts ==
Chart (2016)	Peak position
US Pop Digital Songs (Billboard)	30

== Release history ==
Country	Date	Format	Label	Ref.
Worldwide	July 6, 2016	Download	Interscope; GLAAD	
