= Michael J. Woodard =

American singer and voice actor (born 1997)

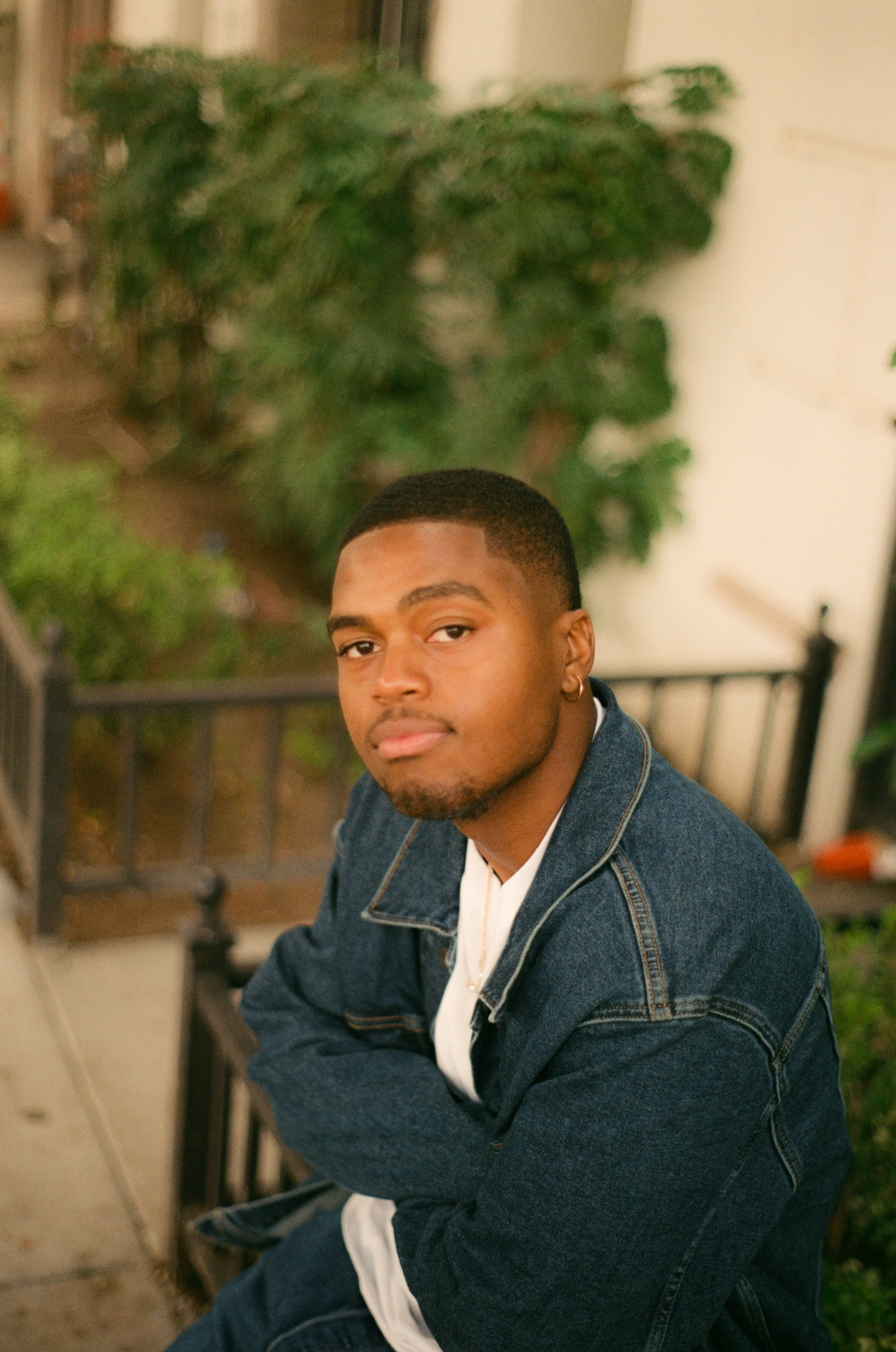
- Woodard in 2023

Background information
- Born: October 6, 1997 (age 28); Philadelphia, Pennsylvania, U.S.
- Genres: Pop; R&B
- Instruments: Vocals
- Labels: Unsub Records

Michael Jordan Woodard (born October 6, 1997) is an American singer and voice actor. He made it to the top five on the sixteenth season of American Idol before being eliminated. He is the voice of Arlo in the film Arlo the Alligator Boy and the follow-up series I ♥ Arlo, for which he has received award nominations.

== Personal life ==
Woodard is from South Philadelphia and was raised in East Falls by his mother and grandmother. His mother Wanda is visually impaired. He attended William M. Meredith School and was also homeschooled for some time. He sung in the church choir at Greater Saint Matthew Baptist Church. His first experience in music was singing "A Little Candle" at a Christmas pageant. When he was eight, he auditioned for a children's play at his local performing arts school. In 2016, he moved to Los Angeles after accepting a degree at the Musicians Institute. At the time of American Idol, he was working as a bowling alley attendant.

== Career ==
In 2009, Woodard performed the national anthem for the Philadelphia Freedoms in King of Prussia and for the last men's quarterfinal match at the US Open. He performed at the US Open again in 2010, and months later performed at a rally for President Barack Obama.

In 2012, Woodard was the winner of Majors & Minors, where American Idol alumni Jennifer Hudson, Jordin Sparks and Adam Lambert appeared as guest mentors with partnership of RCA Music Group as his prize.

Woodard auditioned for American Idol in 2017, singing "Make It Rain". Throughout the competition he sang "You Oughta Know", "Golden Slumbers", "Angel in Blue Jeans", "Titanium", "Believe in Yourself", "Beauty and the Beast", "I Would Die 4 U", and "Flat on the Floor". He was eliminated alongside Cade Foehner in the top five.

Woodard had his voice acting debut in 2021, starring as the titular character in the animated musical film Arlo the Alligator Boy. Director Ryan Crego cast him after seeing his American Idol audition. Woodard reprised the role in the follow-up series I ♥ Arlo.

In May 2021, Woodard was signed to Unsub Records, the record label of American Idol judge Katy Perry. On January 12 2024 he released his debut E.P, MJW1 on Unsub Records/Capitol Records.

Woodard has cited influence from such artists as Trey Songz, Rihanna, Fleetwood Mac, Paul McCartney, Michael Jackson, Tina Turner, Whitney Houston, and Brandy.

== Filmography ==
Year	Title	Role	Notes
2011–2012	Majors & Minors	Himself (contestant)	Winner
2018	American Idol	Himself (contestant)	Season 16; top 5
2021	Arlo the Alligator Boy	Arlo Beauregard (voice)	Film
2021	I ♥ Arlo	Arlo Beauregard (voice)	Main role; 20 episodes

== Discography ==
=== Singles ===
Year	Single	Album(s)	Label
2021	Why You Texting Me?	Non-album single	Unsub Records / Virgin Music
2021	Hope Full	Non-album single	Unsub Records / Virgin Music
2022	Show Some Teeth	Non-album single	Unsub Records / Virgin Music
2023	Trouble	MJW1 E.P	Unsub Records / Capitol Records
2023	Face	MJW1 E.P	Unsub Records / Capitol Records
2023	Ruined	MJW1 E.P	Unsub Records / Capitol Records
2024	Anti You	MJW1 E.P	Unsub Records / Capitol Records
2024	Hems	MJW1 E.P	Unsub Records / Capitol Records
2024	24 Hours	MJW1 E.P	Unsub Records / Capitol Records

== Awards and nominations ==
Year	Awards	Category	Work	Result
2021	Hollywood Music in Media Awards	Best Original Song in an Animated Film	"Follow Me Home" (from Arlo the Alligator Boy)	Nominated
2022	Annie Awards	Outstanding Achievement for Voice Acting in an Animated Television/Broadcast Production	Arlo the Alligator Boy	Nominated
