= Leash (song) =

2024 single by Sky Ferreira

Single by Sky Ferreira
- Released: December 5, 2024
- Genre: Electro-rock; synth-pop
- Length: 4:21
- Label: A24
- Songwriters: Sky Ferreira; Jorge Elbrecht
- Producers: Sky Ferreira; Jorge Elbrecht; Evan Voytas

Sky Ferreira singles chronology
"Don't Forget" (2022)	"Leash" (2024)

Audio video
- "Leash" on YouTube

"Leash" is a song recorded by American singer Sky Ferreira for the soundtrack to the 2024 erotic thriller film Babygirl. She wrote it with Jorge Elbrecht, while the production was handled by the two alongside Evan Voytas. The song was released independently by film distributor A24 on December 5, 2024. It marked Ferreira's first release since her departure from Capitol Records in 2023.

== Background ==
During her career, Sky Ferreira expressed her displeasure with her then-label Capitol Records, stating that they made it difficult for her to release music. She said that they tried to block the release of a music video for the single "Don't Forget" in 2022. In the following year, Capitol Records removed Ferreira's name from their official website and sent her a brief message on her departure from the label.

In mid-2024, Dutch filmmaker Halina Reijn was editing the A24 film Babygirl and contacted Ferreira via email, wanting her to contribute to the soundtrack of the film. Reijn felt that Ferreira's style coincided with the theme of Babygirl. She then watched the film and understood and connected with the story, agreeing to make the song. Titled "Leash", it was released independently on December 5, 2024, becoming her first independent release.

== Composition ==
Ferreira wrote "Leash" with Jorge Elbrecht and produced it with Elbrecht and Evan Voytas. Musically, it is an electro-rock and synth-pop track.
