= Maya B =

American singer-songwriter

- Born: Pasadena, CA
- Genres: R&B, pop, hip hop, trap
- Occupation: Singer-songwriter
- Years active: 2017–present
- Labels: Capitol

Maya B is an American R&B and pop singer-songwriter and visual artist based in Los Angeles.

== Early life ==
Maya grew up in Pasadena, California, and her family later moved to nearby Santa Clarita. She started singing at age 7.

== Career ==
In 2017, Maya released her debut single, "Kiss On My Neck". She was signed to Capitol Records the next year. Her 2018 single "Selenas" was featured on the soundtrack for the 2020 film Promising Young Woman. She wrote and produced the single herself. In 2019, she released the single "Dollar to a Diamond", produced by Soulshock. That year, she went on her first tour as the opener for Summer Walker on the Girls Need Love Tour. Her 2020 single "Sink" features the rapper SAINt JHN, and the music video was animated by Carolyn Knapp.

Her debut EP, [B]1, was released on May 7, 2021. It is a blend of R&B, pop, hip hop, and trap, and features production by Soulshock, Karlin, Hydrate, and Malay.

As a visual artist, she also produces a series of zines, including one called Her Pain / Her Brain, featuring her own artwork.

== Discography ==
=== EP ===
Title	Release details
[B]1	Released: May 7, 2021; Label: Soulpower; Formats: Digital download

=== Singles ===
- "River" (2017)
- "Selenas" (2018)
- "Kiss On My Neck" (2018)
- "Dollar to a Diamond" (2019)
- "Getty Woah" (2019)
- "Not Ready for Love" (2019)
- "Sink" feat. SAINt JHN (2020)
- "The Rest of Our Life" (2020)
- "Real Life" (2021)
- "Running" (2021)
