= Unsub Records =

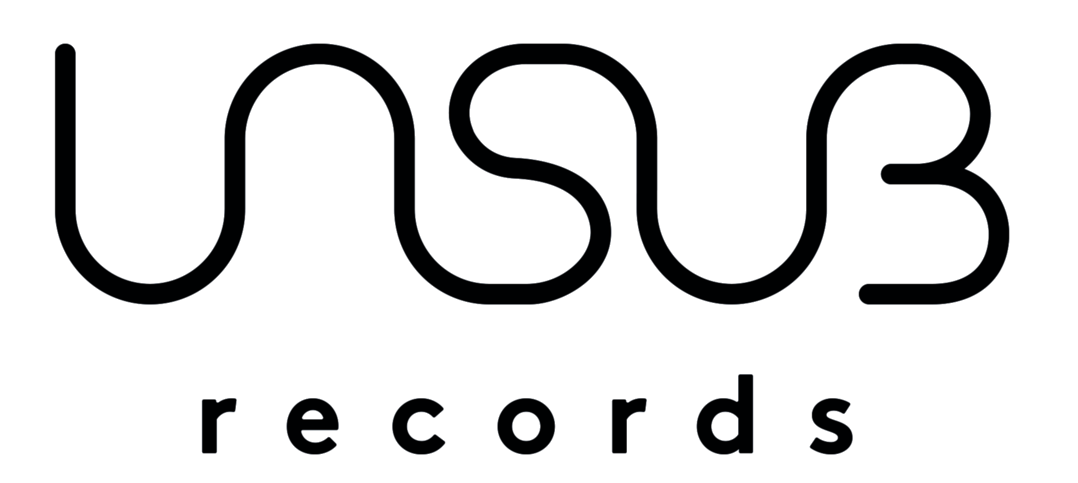
- Parent company: Universal Music Group
- Founded: 2014
- Founder: Katy Perry
- Distributor: Capitol Music Group
- Genre: Pop; rock
- Country of origin: United States
- Location: Los Angeles, California
- Official website: unsubrecords.com

Unsub Records (originally titled Metamorphosis Music) is an American record label founded in 2014 by singer Katy Perry.

== History ==
Perry first announced plans to launch her own label in June 2012. She spoke to The Hollywood Reporter about how the label will be managed: "When this record label does come to fruition, I'm going to try and avoid the things that take away any fighting chance for an artist to have financial success. As people are coming to me with opportunities, I'm thinking, 'How would I want to be treated?'" On June 17, 2014, Perry announced via Twitter that she had launched Metamorphosis Music as a subsidiary of Capitol Records, along with signing the singer-songwriter Ferras. The label's logo was revealed later that day.

In 2016, the label's name was changed to Unsub Records. In July 2017, Perry signed Cyn, who was introduced to Perry through DJ Skeet Skeet after Cyn met him at one of the dates of Perry's California Dreams Tour. In May 2021, Perry signed Michael J. Woodard, a former contestant from season 16 of American Idol.

== Signed artists ==
- Ferras
- Cyn
- Michael J. Woodard

== Releases ==
Artist	Year	Release	Type	Release date
Ferras	2014	Ferras	EP	June 17, 2014
Ferras	2016	"Closer"	Single	June 24, 2016
Ferras	2016	"Medicine (feat. Raja Kumari)"	Single	September 23, 2016
Ferras	2018	"Coming Back Around"	Single	January 26, 2018
Cyn	2017	"Together"	Single	July 14, 2017
Cyn	2017	"Only With You"	Single	September 29, 2017
Cyn	2018	"Alright"	Single	March 2, 2018
Cyn	2018	"Believer"	Single	April 27, 2018
Cyn	2018	"I'll Still Have Me"	Single	September 21, 2018
Cyn	2019	Mood Swing	EP	September 20, 2019
Cyn	2020	"Drinks"	Single	March 6, 2020
Cyn	2020	"New York"	Single	March 6, 2020
Cyn	2022	"House With A View"	Single	July 15, 2022
Cyn	2022	"Losing Sleep"	Single	October 14, 2022
Cyn	2023	"Where Do All The Diamonds Go?"	Single	July 14 2023
Michael J. Woodard	2021	"why you texting me?"	Single	May 21, 2021
Michael J. Woodard	2021	"hope full"	Single	October 22, 2021
Michael J. Woodard	2022	"show some teeth"	Single	February 11, 2022
Michael J. Woodard	2023	"Trouble"	Single	April 21, 2023
Michael J. Woodard	2023	"Face"	Single	July 21, 2023
