= Downhill Lullaby =

Single by Sky Ferreira
- Released: March 27, 2019
- Genre: Chamber pop; trip hop; gothic rock
- Length: 5:32
- Label: Capitol
- Songwriters: Sky Ferreira; Jorge Elbrecht; Tamaryn Brown
- Producers: Jorge Elbrecht; Sky Ferreira

Sky Ferreira singles chronology
"I Blame Myself" (2014)	"Downhill Lullaby" (2019)	"Don't Forget" (2022)

Audio video
- "Downhill Lullaby" on YouTube

"Downhill Lullaby" is a song by the American singer Sky Ferreira, released on March 27, 2019, as the lead single from her intended album, Masochism. It also was featured on the soundtrack for Promising Young Woman. It is her first original material and single since 2014's "I Blame Myself".

== Background ==
After various delays for new music spanning several years, Ferreira began hinting at an upcoming album in November 2018. In early March 2019, she stated on Twitter that the first song to be released from the album "is not a pop song".

== Composition ==
In writing the track, Ferreira explained that she aimed to capture the sound of "the birds in Snow White, singing underwater, while slowly being suffocated by plastic." The song was described as a "five-and-a-half-minute, goth-noir, chamber-pop piece—with strings!—that could have easily closed an episode of the revived Twin Peaks."

== Promotion ==
Ferreira posted the cover art and announced the release date in a social media post on March 21, 2019. She also starred on the first virtual cover of Pitchfork Magazine to promote the single and her upcoming album, which has since been delayed.

== Critical reception ==
Rolling Stone's editor Brittany Spanos ranked the song as "Song You Need to Know" describing the song as "one of her finest and most melodramatic performances yet".

=== Year-end lists ===
Publication	List	Rank	Ref
Pitchfork	100 Best Songs of 2019	93	

== Credits and personnel ==
Credits adapted from Tidal.

- Sky Ferreira – vocals, production
- Jorge Elbrecht – production, vocal bass, programming
- Rune Kielsgaard – drums
- Lars Lundholm – engineering
- Mike Bozzi – mastering
- Dean Hurley – mix engineering
- Ira Grylack – recording engineering
- Matt Neighbor – recording engineering
- Nis Bysted – recording engineering
- Nils Grøndahl – violin
