= Bold (EP) =

EP by Mary Lambert
- Released: May 5, 2017
- Studios: Various: Jeremy Cays Productions; Amherst, Massachusetts; Los Angeles, California
- Genre: Pop
- Length: 28:10
- Label: ML Sings
- Producers: Mary Lambert; Tobias Karlsson; Toby Gad; Michelle Chamuel

Mary Lambert chronology
Heart on My Sleeve (2014)	Bold (2017)

Singles from Bold
- 1. "Hang out with You" Released: July 8, 2016

Bold is an EP by American singer-songwriter Mary Lambert. The record is a follow-up to her album, Heart on My Sleeve (2014). The lead single from the EP is "Hang out with You", which was released on July 8, 2016. Lambert offered the EP as part of a Kickstarter campaign. The EP was commercially released on May 5, 2017.

== Track listing ==
No.	Title	Writer(s)	Producer(s)	Length
1.	"Do Anything"	Mary Lambert	Mary Lambert	3:49
2.	"Lay Your Head Down"	M. Lambert	M. Lambert	7:03
3.	"Hang out with You"	Lambert; Michelle Chamuel	Chamuel	3:11
4.	"Know Your Name"	Lambert; Tobias Karlsson	Karlsson	4:04
5.	"I'd Be Your Wife"	Lambert; Toby Gad	Gad	3:18
6.	"Love Is Love" (featuring Mary Kay Lambert)	Mary Kay Lambert	M. Lambert	2:54
7.	"Know Your Name" (The Reverb Junkie Remix)	Lambert; Karlsson; Chamuel	Karlsson; Chamuel	3:50
Total length:				28:10
