= Haley Tju =

American actress (born 2001)

- Born: Haley Alexandra Tju; February 15, 2001 (age 25); Southern California, U.S.
- Occupation: Actress
- Years active: 2008–present
- Relatives: Brianne Tju (sister)

Haley Alexandra Tju (/ˈtʃuː/) (born February 15, 2001) is an American actress. She is known for her roles as Marcy Wu in the Disney Channel animated series Amphibia, Nu Hai in the DreamWorks Animation series, Kung Fu Panda: The Paws of Destiny, Pepper in the Nickelodeon television series Bella and the Bulldogs and Stella Zhau in the Nickelodeon animated series The Loud House.

== Early life ==
Tju was born in Southern California, and grew up in Chino Hills, California. She began acting at the age of four, and was home schooled. She is of Chinese and Indonesian descent. Her sister Brianne Tju is also an actress.

== Career ==
Her first television appearance was in a commercial for Pizza Hut, while her first TV show performance was a bit part in Hannah Montana at the age of seven. Tju has appeared in television shows, television films, feature films and a short. Tju has appeared on The Suite Life on Deck where she played Young London in an episode. Later came episode appearances on Desperate Housewives, Jessie, Go On, and The Thundermans. She also appeared in the television film Den Brother. In 2013, Tju was signed to a talent deal with Nickelodeon after participating in a showcase at the Los Angeles Groundlings Theater.

Her first prominent role was as a voice actor in the children's animated series Monsters vs. Aliens as Sqweep. Next, Tju landed her first leading role in the Nickelodeon television special, The Massively Mixed Up Middle School Mystery, playing one of three young detectives.

On the Nickelodeon television series Bella and the Bulldogs, Tju played the main role of Pepper Silverstein, the cheerleader best friend of Brec Bassinger's character Bella Dawson.

In 2018, Tju began voicing Stella Zhau on the Nickelodeon animated series The Loud House, Nu Hai in the DreamWorks animated series Kung Fu Panda: The Paws of Destiny and Karmi, Hiro's love interest in Big Hero 6: The Series. She later voiced Marcy Wu on the Disney Channel animated series Amphibia from 2020–2022.

== Filmography ==
Television and film roles
Year	Title	Role	Notes
2008	Hannah Montana	Girl	Episode: "You Never Give Me My Money"
2008	Tasty Time with ZeFronk	Haley	Voice role; episode: "Dom's Fishing Trip"
2009	Desperate Housewives	Little Girl #2	Episode: "Everybody Ought to Have a Maid"
2010	The Suite Life on Deck	Young London Tipton	Episode: "A London Carol"
2010	Burning Palms	Rose	Film
2010	Den Brother	Tina Destiny	Television film
2011	I'm in the Band	Zoey	Episode: "Camp Weasel Rock"
2011	Mike & Molly	Missy	Episode: "Christmas Break"
2011	Happily Divorced	Little Girl	Episode: "I Wanna Be Alone"
2011	The Event	Girl	Episode: "A Message Back"
2012	The New Normal	Little Girl	Episode: "Baby Clothes"
2012–2013	Go On	Abby	Episodes: "Dinner Takes All", "Ring and a Miss"
2013	Jessie	Eileen Miller	Episode: "Lizard Scales and Wrestling Tales"
2013–2014	Monsters vs. Aliens	Sqweep	Main voice role
2014	See Dad Run	Violet	Episode: "See Dad Ruin Joe's Teacher"
2014	The Thundermans	Darcy Wong	Episodes: "Crime After Crime", "Pretty Little Choirs"
2015	The Massively Mixed-Up Middle School Mystery	Alyssa Perry	Television special
2015–2016	Bella and the Bulldogs	Pepper	Main role
2016	Rufus	Paige	Television film
2017	Rufus 2	Paige	Television film
2017	Bones	Meredith Hurley	Episode: "The Tutor in the Tussle"
2017	K.C. Undercover	Zoe	Episodes: "Coopers on the Run", "Welcome to the Jungle", "Web of Lies"
2018–present	The Loud House	Stella Zhau	Recurring voice role
2018–2020	Big Hero 6: The Series	Karmi	Recurring voice role
2018	The Who Was? Show	Herself/Various Characters	Main role
2018	Prince of Peoria	Braughner	Recurring role
2018	Kung Fu Panda: The Paws of Destiny	Nu Hai	Main voice role
2018	Rise of the Teenage Mutant Ninja Turtles	Julia	Voice role; episode: "Always Be Brownies"
2019	NCIS	Alexis	Episode: "Daughters"
2019	Where's Waldo?	Wenda	Main voice role
2019	Middle School Moguls	Yuna	Main role
2019	Schooled	Marni	4 episodes
2019–2020	Trinkets	Rachelle Cohen-Strauss	Recurring role, 6 episodes
2020	Glitch Techs	Lexi Kubota	Recurring voice role
2020–2022	Amphibia	Marcy Wu / Darcy	Recurring voice role
2021	Arlo the Alligator Boy and I Heart Arlo	Alia	Film; voice role and main voice role
2021	Family Guy	Party Guest and Carrie's niece	Voice role; episode: "Must Love Dogs"
2022	The Afterparty	Veronica	2 episodes
2023	The Proud Family: Louder and Prouder	Debbie Chang	Voice role; episode: "Curved"
2023–2025	Chibiverse	Marcy Wu / Darcy	Voice role; 4 episodes
2025	Bat-Fam	Volcana / Claire Selton, Kelly Chen	Main voice role
