= Don't Forget (Sky Ferreira song) =

Single by Sky Ferreira

from the album Masochism
- Released: May 25, 2022
- Recorded: 2020
- Studio: Studio B (Los Angeles)
- Genre: Synth-pop; synth-rock
- Length: 3:48
- Label: Capitol
- Songwriters: Sky Ferreira; Jorge Elbrecht; Tamaryn Brown
- Producers: Sky Ferreira; Jorge Elbrecht

Sky Ferreira singles chronology
"Downhill Lullaby" (2019)	"Don't Forget" (2022)	"Leash" (2024)

Audio video
- "Don't Forget" on YouTube

"Don't Forget" is a song by American singer Sky Ferreira. It was released on May 25, 2022, through Capitol Records. The song was written by Ferreira and Tamaryn, while production was handled by the former and Jorge Elbrecht. "Don't Forget" is the first song released by Ferreira since "Downhill Lullaby" in 2019. Both songs were intended for Ferreira's then-upcoming second album, Masochism.

"Don't Forget" is a synth-pop and synth-rock song, which contains the guitar, horns, drums, and a syncopated dance beat. The lyrics show Ferreira hoping to achieve revenge against people who have done wrong to her. The general public reacted positively to the song.

== Background and release ==
In March 2022, Sky Ferreira revealed a new song titled "Don't Forget". She and the song's producer, Jorge Elbrecht, said it would be "coming soon". Capitol Records confirmed that the song would release on May 25. "Don't Forget" was released as the second single for Ferreira's then-upcoming second studio album, Masochism. It is her first song since "Downhill Lullaby", released three years prior in 2019.

== Recording and composition ==
Ferreira wrote "Don't Forget" with Tamaryn. She recorded "Don't Forget" in 2020, at Capitol Records' Studio B in Los Angeles. The production of the song was handled by Jorge Elbrecht and Ferreira. The mixing of the track was done in Denver, Colorado in 2022.

"Don't Forget" is a pop, synth-pop and synth-rock song, inspired by 80s rock. It contains a tough programmed drum beat. It also makes use of a guitar, which was described as "grungy". The song has a syncopated dance beat, which is preceded by horns and the aforementioned drum. The song's lyrics consist of Ferreira aiming for revenge against people who have done wrong to her. For Dazed, James Greig wrote that "Don't Forget" is angsty, and "at times spiteful".

== Reception ==
Reactions from the general public were positive, though Paper noted that a negative review by Sue Park of Pitchfork had caused a large amount of controversy. In the review, Park opined that "Don't Forget" was bland, and called the song's lyrics "vague". She concluded the review saying that "the song is pretty unmemorable". James Greig of Dazed called the song a "solid return-to-form" for the singer.

== Credits ==
Credits adapted from Spotify.

- Sky Ferreira – performer, producer, songwriter
- Jorge Elbrecht – producer, songwriter
- Tamaryn Brown – songwriter
