= Tamaryn =

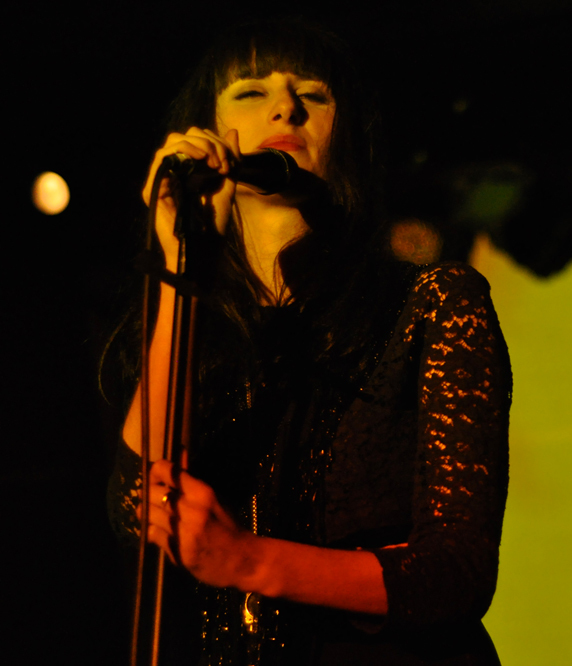
- Tamaryn performing in 2010

Background information
- Born: Tamaryn Sitha Brown; 1982 (age 43–44); New Zealand
- Genres: Dream pop, shoegaze, synth-pop, electronic
- Instrument: Vocals
- Years active: 2008–present
- Labels: Troubleman Records, M'Lady's Records, True Panther Sounds, Hell, Yes! Records, Mexican Summer, Dero Arcade

Tamaryn Sitha Brown (born 1982) is a New Zealand songwriter and singer based in Los Angeles. Since 2008, Tamaryn has released four studio albums, an EP and several singles. Her multifaceted style melds various genres such as dream pop, shoegaze, post-punk, gothic rock, synth-pop and electronic.

== Early life ==
Tamaryn Brown was born in New Zealand. She was raised by a mother and godmother who were Jungian psychologists, and the family moved frequently around New Zealand and, later, the United States. The New Zealand government commissioned her mother and godmother to open a halfway house for runaway teenagers. Tamaryn described being raised with "30 brothers and sisters, kids who had been in different gangs: Mongrel Mob, Black Power… Some of them white, some Māori, some mixed". The halfway house later faced criticism for its unorthodox practices, and the resulting public backlash led to her family moving to Roslyn, Washington. She left home at the age of 13, and remained in the United States thereafter.

== Career ==
Beginning a long collaboration with Californian guitarist Rex John Shelverton (Portraits of Past, the Audience, Vue and Bellavista), Tamaryn self-released a 2008 debut EP, Led Astray, Washed Ashore (later reissued on Troubleman Records), followed by several 7" singles.

In September 2010, Tamaryn's full-length debut album, The Waves, was released on Mexican Summer/Kemado Records.

In May 2011, Tamaryn's song "Cascades" was rearranged to provide the soundtrack to artist Richard Phillips' short film Lindsay Lohan, which starred the actress herself.

In July 2011, True Panther Sounds released a 7" by Les Demoniaques, a project featuring Tamaryn and Dee Dee Penny of Dum Dum Girls covering "Teenage Lust" by the Jesus and Mary Chain.

In November 2011, Tamaryn provided guest vocals on Mexican Summer's 100th release, a 12" by Ford & Lopatin.

In late summer 2012, Mexican Summer released "I'm Gone," the first single from Tamaryn's second album, Tender New Signs, which was released in October of that year. It was her final album with Shelverton as her collaborator.

On Record Store Day 2013, Mexican Summer released a cover of Turning Shrines song "1/4 Circle Black" performed by Jorge Elbrecht (Lansing-Dreiden, Violens) and Tamaryn.

In 2014, Tamaryn was credited for the rebranding and creative direction of the Dum Dum Girls on that band's third Sub Pop album, Too True.

In March 2014, Tamaryn provided the score to a short film written by Bret Easton Ellis, Are You Okay. Her collaborator on the project was former Coil and Psychic TV member Drew McDowall.

Her third album, Cranekiss (2015), featured production by Jorge Elbrecht. Pitchfork writer Jes Skolnik said that Cranekiss "moves from the denser shoegaze thickets of Tender New Signs and The Waves into a pure, sugary dream-pop world. No longer competing for sonic space with a heavy wash of guitar, Tamaryn's voice, even drenched in reverb, becomes the focus". AllMusic critic Heather Phares declared that Cranekiss was "a beautiful pop fantasia that finds Tamaryn expressing her music's passion and sensuality in exciting new ways", and called the album's combination of shoegaze and synth-pop "some of her most arresting music yet".

During April and September 2016, Tamaryn performed as the opening act on Lush's North American reunion tour.

In 2019, Tamaryn released her fourth album Dreaming The Dark with Dero Arcade.

She was credited as a songwriter on Sky Ferreira's 2019 single, "Downhill Lullaby."

== Discography ==
=== Studio albums ===
- The Waves (2010, Mexican Summer)
- Tender New Signs (2012, Mexican Summer/Kemado Records)
- Cranekiss (2015, Mexican Summer)
- Dreaming The Dark (2019, Dero Arcade)

=== Singles and EPs ===
- " Terrified (Robin Guthrie Remix)" single (2019, DERO Arcade)
- "Path to Love (The Horrors Remix)" single (2019, DERO Arcade)
- "Fits of Rage" single (2019, DERO Arcade)
- "Led Astray, Washed Ashore" EP (2008, self-release; 2009, Troubleman Records)
- "Return to Surrender" b/w "Ashore" 7" single (2009, M'Lady's Records)
- "Mild Confusion b/w Light Shadows" 7" single (2009, True Panther Sounds/Matador Records)
- "Weather War" single-sided 7" single (2009, Hell, Yes! Records)
- "I'm Gone" digital single (2012, Mexican Summer)
- "Heavenly Bodies" digital single (2012, Mexican Summer)

=== Other appearances ===
- "Teenage Lust" (The Jesus and Mary Chain cover) single-side 7" flexi-disc by Les Demoniaques (Tamaryn and Dee Dee Penny of Dum Dum Girls) (2011, True Panther Sounds/Matador Records)
- "Flying Dream" on "Snakes/Flying Dream" 12" single by Ford & Lopatin (2011, Mexican Summer)
- "1/4 Circle Black" (Turning Shrines cover) single-sided 7" single by Jorge Elbrecht featuring Tamaryn (2013, Mexican Summer/Kemado Records)
